= Justice Johnson =

Justice Johnson may refer to:

High Court of England and Wales

- Jeremy Johnson (judge) (born 1971)

United States Supreme Court

- Thomas Johnson (judge) (1732–1819), associate justice of the United States Supreme Court
- William Johnson (judge) (1771–1834), associate justice of the United States Supreme Court

United States state supreme courts

- Alexander S. Johnson (1817–1878), chief judge of the New York Court of Appeals
- Benjamin Johnson (Rhode Island judge) (1749–1814), associate justice of the Rhode Island Supreme Court
- Benjamin A. Johnson (1887–1943), associate justice of the Maryland Court of Appeals
- Bernette Joshua Johnson (born 1943), chief justice of the Louisiana Supreme Court
- Byron J. Johnson (1937–2012), associate justice of the Idaho Supreme Court
- Cecil E. Johnson (1888–1955), associate justice of the Arkansas Supreme Court
- Charles W. Johnson (jurist) (born 1951), associate chief justice of the Washington Supreme Court
- Clarke Howard Johnson (1851–1930), associate justice of the Rhode Island Supreme Court
- David Johnson (Michigan jurist) (1809–1886), associate justice of the Michigan Supreme Court
- Denise R. Johnson (born 1947), associate justice of the Vermont Supreme Court
- Howard A. Johnson (1893–1974), associate justice of the Montana Supreme Court
- J. Mercer Johnson (1906–1988), associate justice of the Arizona Supreme Court
- J. Neely Johnson (1825–1872), justice of the Nevada Supreme Court from 1867 to 1871
- J. Philip Johnson (born 1938), justice of the North Dakota Supreme Court from 1974 to 1975 and again in 1992
- James D. Johnson (1924–2010), associate justice of the Arkansas Supreme Court
- James G. Johnson (1855–1936), associate justice of the Supreme Court of Ohio
- James M. Johnson (judge) (fl. 1970s–2010s), associate justice of the Washington Supreme Court
- Jefferson D. Johnson Jr. (1900–1960), associate justice of the North Carolina Supreme Court
- John Johnson Sr. (1770–1824), judge of the Maryland Court of Appeals
- John Johnson (Indiana judge) (1776–1817), associate justice of the Indiana Supreme Court Justices
- John T. Johnson (Oklahoma judge) (1856–1935), associate justice of the Oklahoma Supreme Court
- Lee A. Johnson (born 1947), associate justice of the Kansas Supreme Court
- Nels Johnson (judge) (1896–1958), associate justice of the North Dakota Supreme Court
- Okey Johnson (1834–1903), associate justice of the Supreme Court of Appeals of West Virginia
- Phil Johnson (judge) (born 1944), associate justice of the Supreme Court of Texas
- Sveinbjorn Johnson (1883–1946), associate justice of the North Dakota Supreme Court
- Thomas Johnson (Arkansas judge) (1808–1878), chief justice of the Arkansas Supreme Court
- William Samuel Johnson (1727–1819), member of the colonial Connecticut Supreme Court 1772–1774
- William Wartenbee Johnson (1826–1887), associate justice of the Supreme Court of Ohio

== See also ==
- Harvey M. Johnsen (1895–1975), associate justice of the Nebraska Supreme Court
- Judge Johnson (disambiguation)
- Justice Johnston (disambiguation)
