= Judge Bastian =

Judge Bastian may refer to:

- Stanley Bastian (born 1958), district judge of the United States District Court for the Eastern District of Washington
- Walter M. Bastian (1891–1975), judge of the United States Court of Appeals for the District of Columbia Circuit
