= Martin Donald Van Oosterhout =

American judge (1900–1979)

Senior Judge of the United States Court of Appeals for the Eighth Circuit
- In office July 6, 1971 – January 28, 1979

Chief Judge of the United States Court of Appeals for the Eighth Circuit
- In office 1968–1970
- Preceded by: Charles Joseph Vogel
- Succeeded by: Marion Charles Matthes

Judge of the United States Court of Appeals for the Eighth Circuit
- In office August 26, 1954 – July 6, 1971
- Appointed by: Dwight D. Eisenhower
- Preceded by: Seth Thomas
- Succeeded by: Roy Laverne Stephenson

Member of the Iowa House of Representatives from the 81st district
- In office January 9, 1939 – January 10, 1943
- Preceded by: Albert Beltman
- Succeeded by: Anthony Te Paske

Personal details
- Born: Martin Donald Van Oosterhout; October 10, 1900 Orange City, Iowa, U.S.
- Died: January 28, 1979 (aged 78)
- Party: Republican
- Children: 1
- Parents: Peter (father); Sarah (mother)
- Education: University of Iowa (BA); University of Iowa College of Law (JD)

Martin Donald Van Oosterhout (October 10, 1900 – January 28, 1979) was a legislator and state court judge in northwestern Iowa, and a United States circuit judge of the United States Court of Appeals for the Eighth Circuit.

== Education and career ==
Born in Orange City, Iowa, Van Oosterhout received a Bachelor of Arts degree from the University of Iowa in 1922, and a Juris Doctor from the University of Iowa College of Law in 1924. He was in private practice in Orange City from 1924 to 1933. In the last four of those years (from 1929 to 1933) he also served as a Republican member of the Iowa House of Representatives. He was a Judge of the 21st Judicial District of Iowa from 1943 to 1954.

== Federal judicial service ==
On August 16, 1954, Van Oosterhout was nominated by President Dwight D. Eisenhower to a seat on the United States Court of Appeals for the Eighth Circuit vacated when a fellow Iowan, Judge Seth Thomas, assumed senior status. He was confirmed by the United States Senate on August 20, 1954, and received his commission on August 26, 1954. He served as Chief Judge and member of the Judicial Conference of the United States from 1968 to 1970. He assumed senior status on July 6, 1971. He was a Judge of the Temporary Emergency Court of Appeals from 1972 to 1977. He served in senior status until his death on January 28, 1979.

== Personal life ==
Van Oosterhout's parents were Peter and Sarah. He was married to Ethel Greenway, with whom he had one son, Peter Denne.

== Sources ==
Legal offices
Preceded by Seth Thomas	Judge of the United States Court of Appeals for the Eighth Circuit; 1954–1971	Succeeded by Roy Laverne Stephenson
Preceded by Charles Joseph Vogel	Chief Judge of the United States Court of Appeals for the Eighth Circuit; 1968–1970	Succeeded by Marion Charles Matthes
