= Seth Thomas =

Seth Thomas may refer to:

- Seth Thomas (clockmaker) (1785–1859)
- Seth Thomas Clock Company
- Seth Thomas (judge) (1873–1962)
