= Barrington Parker =

Barrington Parker may refer to:

- Barrington D. Parker (1915–1993), judge of the United States District Court for the District of Columbia
- Barrington Daniels Parker Jr. (born 1944), senior judge of the United States Court of Appeals for the Second Circuit
