= Judge Johnston =

Judge Johnston my refer to:

- Iain D. Johnston (born 1965), judge of the United States District Court for the Northern District of Illinois
- Thomas E. Johnston (born 1967), judge of the United States District Court for the Southern District of West Virginia
- Henry Johnston, Lord Johnston (1844–1931), Scottish judge

== See also ==
- Justice Johnston (disambiguation)
- Edward Huggins Johnstone (1922–2013), judge of the United States District Court for the Western District of Kentucky
