= Justice Westcott =

Justice Westcott may refer to:

- James Westcott (1802–1880), associate justice of the Florida Supreme Court
- Thomas Westcott (1758–1838), associate justice of the Rhode Island Supreme Court
