= Judge Johnson =

Judge Johnson may refer to:

- Alan Bond Johnson (born 1939), judge of the United States District Court for the District of Wyoming
- Albert Williams Johnson (1872–1957), judge of the United States District Court for the Middle District of Pennsylvania
- Alexander S. Johnson (1817–1878), judge of the United States Circuit Court for the Second Circuit and the New York Court of Appeals
- Benjamin Johnson (judge) (1784–1849), judge of the United States District Court for the District of Arkansas
- Charles F. Johnson (1859–1930), judge of the United States Court of Appeals for the First Circuit
- Frank Minis Johnson (1918–1999), judge of the United States Courts of Appeals for the Fifth and Eleventh Circuits
- George E. Q. Johnson (1874–1949), judge of the United States District Court for the Northern District of Illinois
- Inge Prytz Johnson (born 1945), judge of the United States District Court for the Northern District of Alabama
- Jed Johnson (Oklahoma politician) (1888–1963), judge of the United States Customs Court
- Jeffrey W. Johnson (born 1960), magistrate judge of the United States District Court for the Central District of California
- Joseph T. Johnson (1858–1919), judge of the United States District Court for the Western District of South Carolina
- Kristi Haskins Johnson (born 1980), judge of the United States District Court for the Southern District of Mississippi
- Luther Alexander Johnson (1875–1965), judge of the United States Tax Court
- Noble J. Johnson (1887–1968), judge of the United States Court of Customs and Patent Appeals
- Norma Holloway Johnson (1932–2011), judge of the United States District Court for the District of Columbia
- Samuel D. Johnson Jr. (1920–2002), judge of the United States Court of Appeals for the Fifth Circuit
- Sterling Johnson Jr. (1934–2022), judge of the United States District Court for the Eastern District of New York
- Tillman D. Johnson (1858–1953), judge of the United States District Court for the District of Utah
- William P. Johnson (born 1959), judge of the United States District Court for the District of New Mexico

== See also ==
- Harvey M. Johnsen (1895–1975), judge of the United States Court of Appeals for the Eighth Circuit
- Justice Johnson (disambiguation)
