= Archibald K. Gardner =

American judge (1867–1962)

Senior Judge of the United States Court of Appeals for the Eighth Circuit
- In office September 30, 1960 – January 21, 1962

Chief Judge of the United States Court of Appeals for the Eighth Circuit
- In office September 1, 1948 – August 7, 1959
- Preceded by: Office established
- Succeeded by: Harvey M. Johnsen

Judge of the United States Court of Appeals for the Eighth Circuit
- In office May 23, 1929 – September 30, 1960
- Appointed by: Herbert Hoover
- Preceded by: Seat established by 45 Stat. 1346
- Succeeded by: Albert Alphonso Ridge

Personal details
- Born: December 3, 1867 Owen Sound, Ontario, Canada
- Died: January 21, 1962 (aged 94) Huron, South Dakota, U.S.
- Education: University of Iowa (AB); University of Iowa College of Law (LLB)

Archibald Kenneth Gardner (December 3, 1867 – January 21, 1962) was a United States circuit judge of the United States Court of Appeals for the Eighth Circuit.

== Education and career ==
Gardner was born in Owen Sound, Ontario, Canada. In 1892, he received a Bachelor of Arts degree from the University of Iowa in Iowa City, Iowa. The following year, he procured a Bachelor of Laws from the University of Iowa College of Law. From 1893 to 1895, he was engaged in the private practice of law in Greenfield in Dade County in southwestern Missouri. From 1895 to 1897, he practiced in Rapid City, South Dakota, where he was the city attorney from 1897 until 1904. He was thereafter from 1907 to 1929 the general attorney for the South Dakota division of the Chicago and North Western Transportation Company.

== Federal judicial service ==
Gardner was nominated by President Herbert Hoover on April 18, 1929, to the United States Court of Appeals for the Eighth Circuit, to a new seat authorized by 45 Stat. 1346. He was confirmed by the United States Senate on May 23, 1929, and received his commission the same day. He was a member of the Conference of Senior Circuit Judges (now the Judicial Conference of the United States) from 1947 to 1948, and a member of the Judicial Conference of the United States from 1948 to 1959. He served as Chief Judge from September 1, 1948 to August 7, 1959. He assumed senior status on September 30, 1960. His service terminated on January 21, 1962, due to his death in Huron, Beadle County in eastern South Dakota.

=== Assignment of Judge Davies to the Eastern District of Arkansas ===
In 1957, Gardner assigned Ronald Davies of North Dakota to preside over the United States District Court for the Eastern District of Arkansas in Little Rock, Arkansas. It was Davies whose orders led to the Little Rock Integration Crisis in which then Governor Orval Faubus made a vain attempt to stop the desegregation of Central High School in the Arkansas capital city.

== See also ==
- List of United States federal judges by longevity of service

== Sources ==
Legal offices
Preceded by Seat established by 45 Stat. 1346	Judge of the United States Court of Appeals for the Eighth Circuit; 1929–1960	Succeeded by Albert Alphonso Ridge
Preceded by Office established	Chief Judge of the United States Court of Appeals for the Eighth Circuit; 1948–1959	Succeeded by Harvey M. Johnsen
