= John David Kelly (judge) =

American judge (1934–1998)

Judge of the United States Court of Appeals for the Eighth Circuit
- In office August 3, 1998 – October 21, 1998
- Appointed by: Bill Clinton
- Preceded by: Frank J. Magill
- Succeeded by: Kermit Edward Bye

Personal details
- Born: John David Kelly; October 9, 1934 Grand Forks, North Dakota, US
- Died: October 21, 1998 (aged 64) Rochester, Minnesota, US
- Spouse: Patricia "Tish" Kelly
- Education: Saint John's University (AB); University of Michigan Law School (JD)

John David Kelly (October 9, 1934 – October 21, 1998) was a United States circuit judge of the United States Court of Appeals for the Eighth Circuit.

== Early life and education ==
Born in Grand Forks, North Dakota, Kelly earned an Artium Baccalaureus degree in 1956 from Saint John's University in Collegeville, Minnesota, and a Juris Doctor in 1959 from the University of Michigan Law School. In 1961, Kelly married Patricia "Tish" Greeley, who later would serve as the Speaker of the North Dakota House of Representatives.

== Professional career ==
A lieutenant in the United States Air Force, Kelly worked as an attorney in the Office of General Counsel at The Pentagon from 1959 until 1962. Kelly returned to North Dakota in 1962. From 1962 until joining the federal bench in 1998, Kelly worked in private legal practice in Fargo, North Dakota, at the Vogel Law Firm. He served as president of the firm for his final 20 years with the firm. In 1974, Kelly argued before the Supreme Court of the United States in the case of Chapman v. Meier. The Court unanimously found in favor of his client.

== Federal judicial service ==
On January 27, 1998, President Bill Clinton nominated Kelly to a seat on the United States Court of Appeals for the Eighth Circuit to replace Judge Frank J. Magill, who had taken senior status in April 1997. The United States Senate confirmed Kelly in a voice vote on July 31, 1998, received his commission on August 3, 1998 and commenced service on August 26, 1998.

Shortly after being sworn in, Kelly fell ill with an infection in mid-October 1998 and was taken to the Mayo Clinic. On October 21, 1998, Kelly died in Rochester, Minnesota, before his investiture had taken place. Given his short tenure on the Court, Kelly participated in only a small number of cases. He provided a crucial vote that affirmed the district court by an evenly divided vote of the Court en banc. He authored only a few opinions, including one that the Court of Appeals posthumously released.

== Sources ==
Legal offices
| Preceded by Frank J. Magill | Judge of the United States Court of Appeals for the Eighth Circuit; 1998 | Succeeded by Kermit Edward Bye |
