= Pasco Bowman II =

American judge (born 1933)

Pasco Bowman
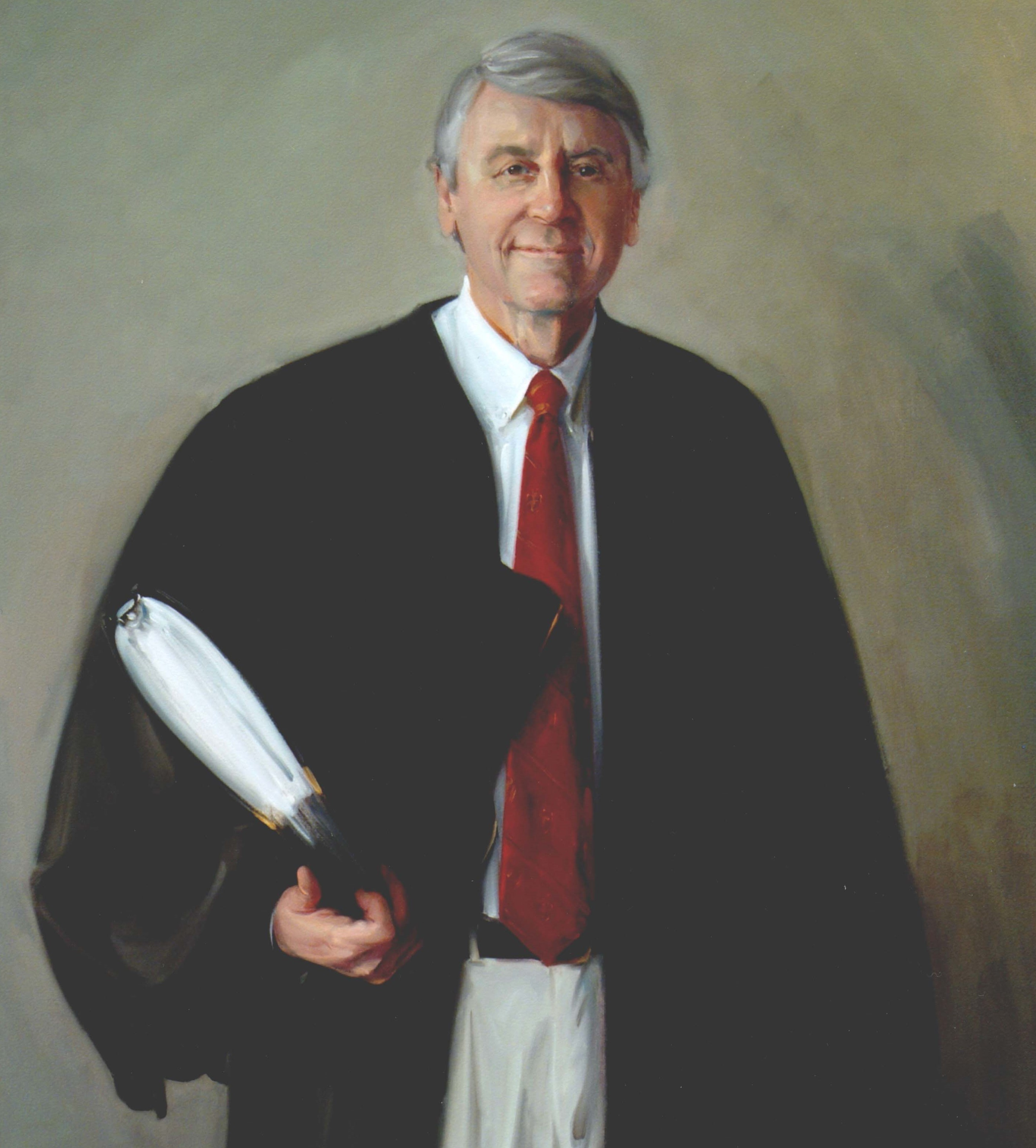

Senior Judge of the United States Court of Appeals for the Eighth Circuit
- Incumbent
- Assumed office August 1, 2003

Chief Judge of the United States Court of Appeals for the Eighth Circuit
- In office April 17, 1998 – April 24, 1999
- Preceded by: Richard S. Arnold
- Succeeded by: Roger Leland Wollman

Judge of the United States Court of Appeals for the Eighth Circuit
- In office July 19, 1983 – August 1, 2003
- Appointed by: Ronald Reagan
- Preceded by: J. Smith Henley
- Succeeded by: Raymond Gruender

Personal details
- Born: Pasco Middleton Bowman II; December 20, 1933 (age 92) Harrisonburg, Virginia, U.S.
- Education: Bridgewater College (BA); New York University (JD); University of Virginia (LLM)

Military service
- Allegiance: United States
- Branch/service: United States Army
- Years of service: 1959-1984
- Rank: Colonel
- Unit: Army Judge Advocate General's Corps

Pasco Middleton Bowman II (born December 20, 1933) is an American attorney and jurist serving as a senior United States circuit judge of the United States Court of Appeals for the Eighth Circuit.

== Early life and education ==
Bowman was born in Harrisonburg, Virginia and grew up in New Market and Timberville, Virginia. He graduated from New Market High School and received a Bachelor of Arts degree in English from Bridgewater College in 1955. He earned a Juris Doctor from New York University School of Law in 1958, where he was a Root-Tilden scholar and served as managing editor of the New York University Law Review. He then went into private practice of law. From 1958 to 1964, with time out for military service and his Fulbright year at the London School of Economics, he was associated with the New York City law firm of Cravath, Swaine & Moore.

== Career ==
Bowman was a member of the faculty of University of Georgia School of Law from 1964 to 1970. He was then dean and professor at Wake Forest University School of Law from 1970 to 1978, and a visiting professor at the University of Virginia School of Law from 1978 to 1979. He was dean and professor at the University of Missouri–Kansas City School of Law from July 1979 to July 1983. He attended The Judge Advocate General's Legal Center and School at the University of Virginia and entered Judge Advocate General's Corps from 1959 to 1984.

=== Federal judicial service ===
On May 24, 1983, President Ronald Reagan nominated Bowman to the United States Court of Appeals for the Eighth Circuit to fill a seat vacated by Judge J. Smith Henley. The United States Senate confirmed Bowman on July 18, 1983, and he received his commission on July 19, 1983. He served as Chief Judge from 1998 to 1999. He assumed senior status on August 1, 2003.

Bowman completed the graduate program for judges at the University of Virginia School of Law and received his Master of Laws from the University of Virginia in 1986.

His service to the federal judiciary includes tours of duty on the Criminal Law Committee, the Federal-State Jurisdiction Committee, and the Board of Directors of the Federal Judicial Center. Notably, Bowman authored the Eighth Circuit's opinion in Clinton v. Jones that held the Constitution does not protect the President from federal civil litigation involving actions committed before entering office. The Supreme Court affirmed the judgment 9–0.

Conservative commentator Ann Coulter clerked for Bowman.

=== Possible Supreme Court candidacy ===
Judge Bowman was on the short list of candidates to fill the United States Supreme Court vacancy created by the retirement of Justice Lewis F. Powell Jr. in 1987. Bowman was favored for Powell’s seat by North Carolina arch-conservative Jesse Helms. However, alongside devout Mormon John Clifford Wallace, Bowman was viewed by the Senate’s Democratic majority as the most controversial amongst the thirteen or fourteen nominees proposed by President Reagan after Robert Bork was rejected. Bowman was viewed as aggressively anti-labor and consistently opposed to the rights of women and prisoners, and attracted further controversy because he stated that he believed laws against insider trading should be repealed. White House Chief of Staff Howard Baker heard objections to Bowman from Joe Biden and Robert Byrd on October 26, 1987, and with Republicans needing Democratic support to prevent a repeat of Bork’s debacle, the seat ultimately went to Judge Anthony Kennedy. Bowman may also have been considered by George H. W. Bush to replace the retired William J. Brennan Jr. in 1990, although he failed to make the final shortlist for Brennan’s replacement.

== See also ==
- List of United States federal judges by longevity of service

== Sources ==
Legal offices
Preceded by J. Smith Henley	Judge of the United States Court of Appeals for the Eighth Circuit; 1983–2003	Succeeded by Raymond Gruender
Preceded by Richard S. Arnold	Chief Judge of the United States Court of Appeals for the Eighth Circuit; 1998–1999	Succeeded by Roger Leland Wollman
