= Marion Charles Matthes =

American judge (1906–1980)

Senior Judge of the United States Court of Appeals for the Eighth Circuit
- In office July 14, 1973 – November 30, 1980

Chief Judge of the United States Court of Appeals for the Eighth Circuit
- In office 1970–1973
- Preceded by: Martin Donald Van Oosterhout
- Succeeded by: Pat Mehaffy

Judge of the United States Court of Appeals for the Eighth Circuit
- In office March 12, 1958 – July 14, 1973
- Appointed by: Dwight D. Eisenhower
- Preceded by: Charles Evans Whittaker
- Succeeded by: William H. Webster

Personal details
- Born: Marion Charles Matthes; January 29, 1906 De Soto, Missouri, U.S.
- Died: November 30, 1980 (aged 74)
- Education: Benton College of Law read law

Marion Charles Matthes (January 29, 1906 – November 30, 1980) was a United States circuit judge of the United States Court of Appeals for the Eighth Circuit.

== Education and career ==
Born in De Soto, Missouri, Matthes attended Benton College of Law (now defunct), and read law in 1928 to enter the bar. He was in private practice in DeSoto and Hillsboro, Missouri from 1928 to 1955. He was deputy state finance commissioner in 1929, and was a city attorney for DeSoto from 1938 to 1940. In 1942, he was elected to the Missouri Senate, where he served until 1950. He was a member of the Missouri State Highway Commission from 1954 to 1955. Matthes also lectured at the School of Law at Washington University in St. Louis.

== Federal judicial service ==
On February 19, 1958, Matthes was nominated by President Dwight D. Eisenhower to a seat on the United States Court of Appeals for the Eighth Circuit vacated by Judge Charles Evans Whittaker. Matthes was confirmed by the United States Senate on March 4, 1958, and received his commission on March 12, 1958. He served as Chief Judge from 1970 to 1973, assuming senior status on July 14, 1973, and serving in that capacity until his death on November 30, 1980.

Just five months into his federal judicial service, Judge Matthes authored the opinion of the Court of Appeals for the Eighth Circuit, sitting en banc, in Aaron v. Cooper, 257 F.2d 33 (8th Cir. 1958). In reversing the United States District Court for the Eastern District of Arkansas, the Eighth Circuit held that incidents in Little Rock, which stemmed from widespread community opposition to public school integration and that negatively impacted normal educational processes, were not enough to legally justify suspending the integration plan previously ordered by the federal courts. "We say the time has not yet come in these United States when an order of a Federal Court must be whittled away, watered down, or shamefully withdrawn in the face of violent and unlawful acts of individual citizens in opposition thereto," he wrote. The Supreme Court unanimously affirmed the Eighth Circuit's judgment in a landmark opinion jointly authored by all nine Justices.

Eugene R. Sullivan, now a senior judge of the United States Court of Appeals for the Armed Forces, served as a law clerk for Judge Matthes.

== Sources ==
Legal offices
Preceded by Charles Evans Whittaker	Judge of the United States Court of Appeals for the Eighth Circuit; 1958–1973	Succeeded by William H. Webster
Preceded by Martin Donald Van Oosterhout	Chief Judge of the United States Court of Appeals for the Eighth Circuit; 1970–1973	Succeeded by Pat Mehaffy
