= Pat Mehaffy =

American judge (1904–1981)

Senior Judge of the United States Court of Appeals for the Eighth Circuit
- In office August 31, 1974 – January 31, 1981

Chief Judge of the United States Court of Appeals for the Eighth Circuit
- In office 1973–1974
- Preceded by: Marion Charles Matthes
- Succeeded by: Floyd Robert Gibson

Judge of the United States Court of Appeals for the Eighth Circuit
- In office July 16, 1963 – August 31, 1974
- Appointed by: John F. Kennedy
- Preceded by: Joseph William Woodrough
- Succeeded by: J. Smith Henley

Personal details
- Born: Pat Mehaffy; October 8, 1904 Little Rock, Arkansas, U.S.
- Died: January 31, 1981 (aged 76) Little Rock, Arkansas, U.S.
- Education: University of Arkansas School of Law (LLB)

Pat Mehaffy (October 8, 1904 – January 31, 1981) was a United States circuit judge of the United States Court of Appeals for the Eighth Circuit.

== Education and career ==
Born in Little Rock, Arkansas, Mehaffy received a Bachelor of Laws from the University of Arkansas School of Law in 1927. He was in private practice in Little Rock from 1929 to 1930. He was an assistant state attorney general of Arkansas from 1929 to 1933. He was chief deputy prosecuting attorney of Pulaski County, Arkansas from 1934 to 1938. He was prosecuting attorney of Pulaski County from 1939 to 1940. He was in private practice in Little Rock from 1940 to 1963.

== Federal judicial service ==
Mehaffy was nominated by President John F. Kennedy on June 24, 1963, to a seat on the United States Court of Appeals for the Eighth Circuit vacated by Judge Joseph William Woodrough. He was confirmed by the United States Senate on July 15, 1963, and received his commission on July 16, 1963. He served as Chief Judge from 1973 to 1974. He assumed senior status due to a certified disability on August 31, 1974. Mehaffy served in that capacity until his death on January 31, 1981, in Little Rock.

== Sources ==
Legal offices
Preceded by Joseph William Woodrough	Judge of the United States Court of Appeals for the Eighth Circuit; 1963–1974	Succeeded by J. Smith Henley
Preceded by Marion Charles Matthes	Chief Judge of the United States Court of Appeals for the Eighth Circuit; 1973–1974	Succeeded by Floyd Robert Gibson
