= List of federal judges appointed by Dwight D. Eisenhower =

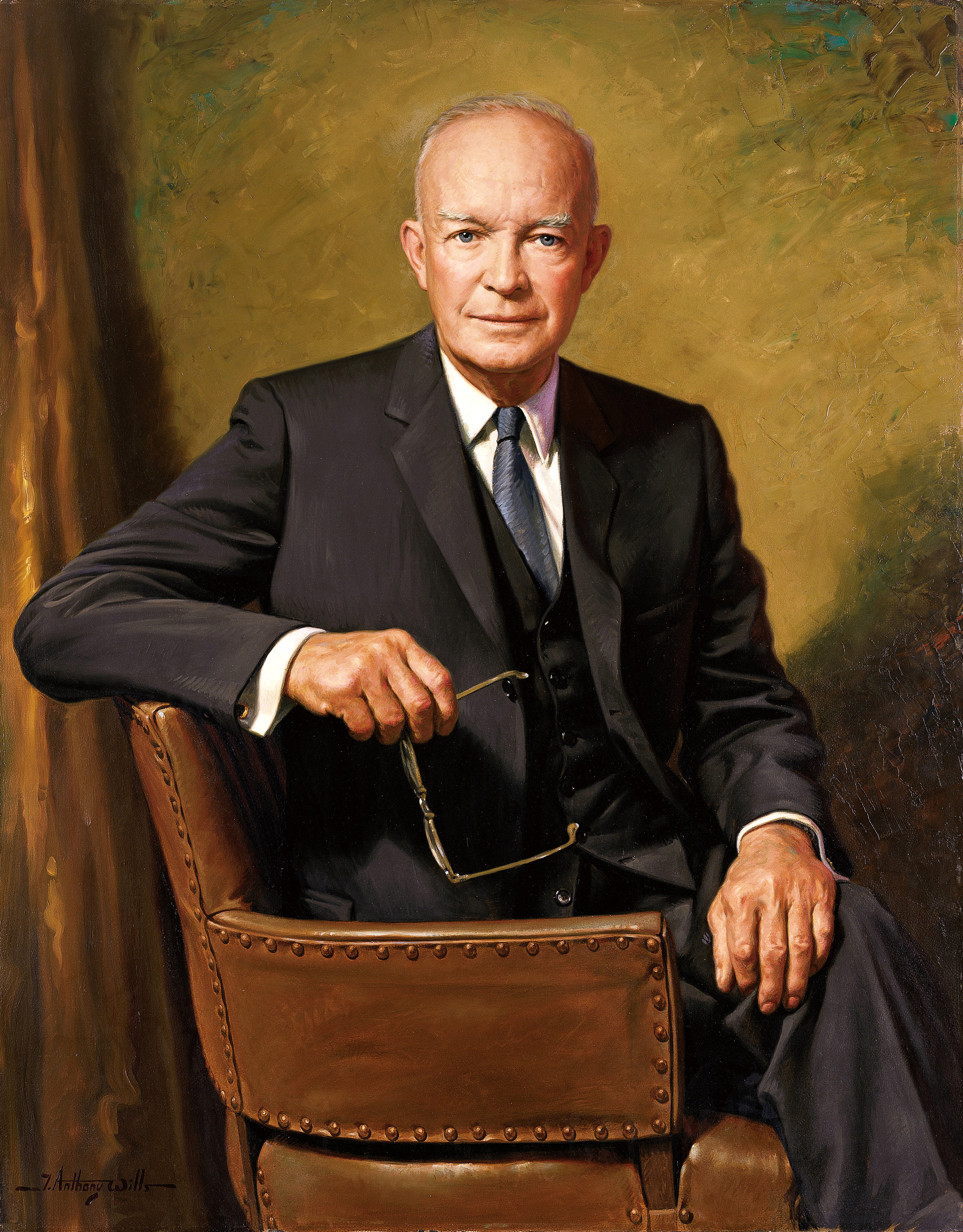
President Dwight D. Eisenhower.

Following is a list of all Article III United States federal judges appointed by President Dwight D. Eisenhower during his presidency. In total Eisenhower appointed 185 Article III federal judges, including 5 Justices to the Supreme Court of the United States (including one Chief Justice), 45 judges to the United States Courts of Appeals, 130 judges to the United States district courts, 2 judges to the United States Court of Customs and Patent Appeals, 2 judges to the United States Court of Claims and 1 judge to the United States Customs Court.

Three federal courts were raised to Article III status during Eisenhower's tenure, the United States Court of Claims on July 28, 1953, the United States Customs Court on July 14, 1956, and the United States Court of Customs and Patent Appeals on August 25, 1958. Judges appointed prior to those dates are counted as Article I judicial appointments, later gaining Article III status by operation of law, while judges appointed after those dates are counted as Article III judicial appointments. Eisenhower appointed 5 total Article I federal judges to these courts, including 3 judges to the United States Court of Customs and Patent Appeals, 0 judges to the United States Court of Claims and 2 judges to the United States Customs Court.

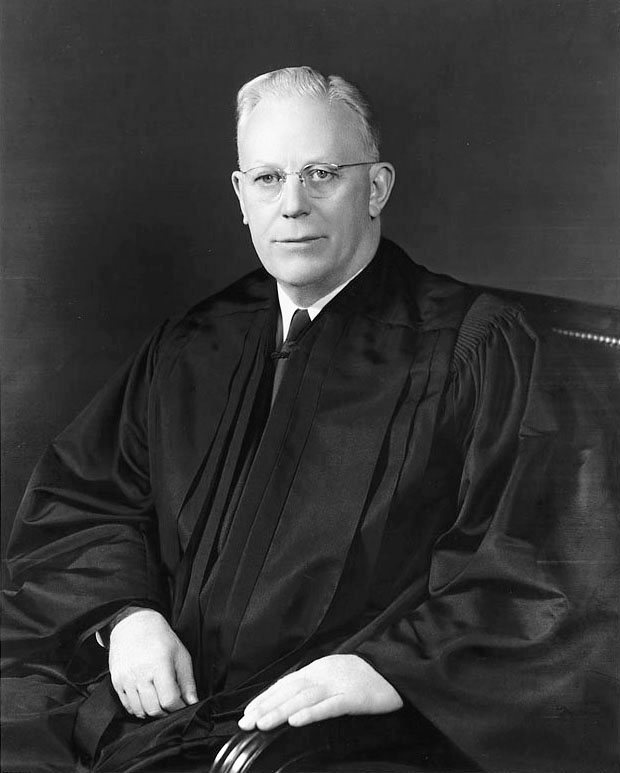
Eisenhower picked Earl Warren to be Chief Justice of the United States.

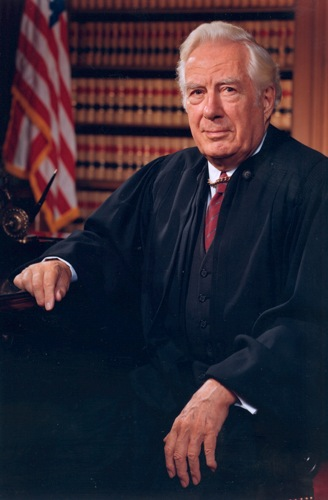
Warren E. Burger was among the five Court of Appeals judges appointed by Eisenhower to later serve on the Supreme Court.

== United States Supreme Court justices ==
#	Justice	Seat	State	Former justice	Nomination date	Confirmation date	Began active service	Ended active service	Ended retired service
1	Earl Warren	Chief	California	Fred M. Vinson	January 11, 1954	March 1, 1954	October 2, 1953	June 23, 1969	July 9, 1974
2	John Marshall Harlan II	9	New York	Robert H. Jackson	November 9, 1954 (Note: Renominated on January 10, 1955.)	March 16, 1955	March 17, 1955	September 23, 1971	December 29, 1971
3	William J. Brennan Jr.	3	New Jersey	Sherman Minton	January 14, 1957	March 19, 1957	October 15, 1956	July 20, 1990	July 24, 1997
4	Charles Evans Whittaker	6	Missouri	Stanley Forman Reed	March 2, 1957	March 19, 1957	March 22, 1957	March 31, 1962	September 30, 1965
5	Potter Stewart	8	Ohio	Harold Hitz Burton	January 17, 1959	May 5, 1959	October 14, 1958	July 3, 1981	December 7, 1985

== Courts of appeals ==
#	Judge	Circuit	Nomination date	Confirmation date	Began active service	Ended active service	Ended senior status
1	John A. Danaher	D.C.	January 11, 1954	March 30, 1954	October 1, 1953	January 22, 1969	September 22, 1990
2	Carroll C. Hincks	Second	January 11, 1954	February 9, 1954	October 3, 1953	May 15, 1959	September 30, 1964
3	Elmer Jacob Schnackenberg	Seventh	January 11, 1954	February 9, 1954	November 17, 1953	September 15, 1968	–
4	John Marshall Harlan II	Second	January 13, 1954	February 9, 1954	February 10, 1954	March 27, 1955	Elevated
5	Potter Stewart	Sixth	April 6, 1954	April 23, 1954	April 27, 1954	October 13, 1958	Elevated
6	Dal Millington Lemmon	Ninth	April 6, 1954	April 27, 1954	April 29, 1954	April 26, 1958	–
7	Richard Harvey Chambers	Ninth	April 6, 1954	April 27, 1954	April 30, 1954	December 31, 1976	October 21, 1994
8	James Alger Fee	Ninth	April 6, 1954	April 23, 1954	April 30, 1954	August 25, 1959	–
9	Elbert Tuttle	Fifth / Eleventh	July 7, 1954	August 3, 1954	August 4, 1954	June 1, 1968	June 23, 1996
10	Charles Joseph Vogel	Eighth	August 16, 1954	August 18, 1954	August 20, 1954	February 20, 1968	September 8, 1980
11	Martin Donald Van Oosterhout	Eighth	August 16, 1954	August 20, 1954	August 26, 1954	July 6, 1971	January 28, 1979
12	Walter M. Bastian	D.C.	August 19, 1954 (Note: Renominated on November 8, 1954.)	December 2, 1954	September 20, 1954	March 16, 1965	March 12, 1975
13	Benjamin Franklin Cameron	Fifth	February 18, 1955	March 14, 1955	March 16, 1955	April 3, 1964	–
14	Warren Leroy Jones	Fifth / Eleventh	March 4, 1955	April 19, 1955	April 21, 1955	February 17, 1966	November 11, 1993
15	J. Edward Lumbard	Second	May 13, 1955	July 11, 1955	July 12, 1955	July 20, 1971	June 3, 1999
16	Sterry R. Waterman	Second	May 13, 1955	July 11, 1955	July 13, 1955	November 13, 1970	February 6, 1984
17	John Robert Brown	Fifth	April 25, 1955	July 22, 1955	July 27, 1955	July 20, 1984	January 23, 1993
18	Stanley Barnes	Ninth	March 5, 1956	March 20, 1956	March 21, 1956	October 31, 1970	March 5, 1990
19	Warren E. Burger	D.C.	June 21, 1955 (Note: Renominated on January 12, 1956.)	March 28, 1956	March 29, 1956	June 23, 1969	Elevated
20	David Thomas Lewis	Tenth	May 17, 1956	June 4, 1956	June 5, 1956	December 3, 1977	September 28, 1983
21	Charles Evans Whittaker	Eighth	March 16, 1956	June 4, 1956	June 5, 1956	March 24, 1957	Elevated
22	Frederick George Hamley	Ninth	May 22, 1956	June 29, 1956	July 2, 1956	July 6, 1971	May 5, 1975
23	Simon Sobeloff	Fourth	July 14, 1955	July 16, 1956	July 18, 1956	December 31, 1970	July 11, 1973
24	Clement Haynsworth	Fourth	February 19, 1957	April 4, 1957	April 4, 1957	April 6, 1981	November 22, 1989
25	Jean Sala Breitenstein	Tenth	June 5, 1957	June 26, 1957	June 27, 1957	July 31, 1970	January 30, 1986
26	John Minor Wisdom	Fifth	March 14, 1957	June 26, 1957	June 27, 1957	January 15, 1977	May 15, 1999
27	John Simpson Hastings	Seventh	March 14, 1957	August 22, 1957	August 26, 1957	February 1, 1969	February 7, 1977
28	William Lynn Parkinson	Seventh	August 21, 1957	August 22, 1957	August 26, 1957	October 26, 1959	–
29	Leonard P. Moore	Second	March 19, 1957 (Note: Renominated on January 13, 1958.)	February 25, 1958	September 6, 1957	March 1, 1971	December 7, 1982
30	Marion Charles Matthes	Eighth	February 19, 1958	March 4, 1958	March 12, 1958	July 14, 1973	November 30, 1980
31	Oliver Deveta Hamlin Jr.	Ninth	March 6, 1958	March 25, 1958	March 26, 1958	September 5, 1963	December 28, 1973
32	Gilbert H. Jertberg	Ninth	August 16, 1958	August 19, 1958	August 21, 1958	September 30, 1967	June 8, 1973
33	Winfred George Knoch	Seventh	August 16, 1958	August 19, 1958	August 21, 1958	December 4, 1967	May 23, 1983
34	Latham Castle	Seventh	February 26, 1959	April 29, 1959	April 30, 1959	February 28, 1970	March 10, 1986
35	Herbert Stephenson Boreman	Fourth	January 20, 1959	June 16, 1959	June 17, 1959	June 15, 1971	March 26, 1982
36	Lester LeFevre Cecil	Sixth	February 17, 1959	July 15, 1959	July 18, 1959	August 1, 1965	November 26, 1982
37	Bailey Aldrich	First	February 26, 1959	September 9, 1959	September 10, 1959	August 31, 1972	September 25, 2002
38	Phillip Forman	Third	February 9, 1959	September 9, 1959	September 10, 1959	March 31, 1961	August 17, 1978
39	Henry Friendly	Second	March 10, 1959	September 9, 1959	September 10, 1959	April 15, 1974	March 11, 1986
40	Paul Charles Weick	Sixth	August 5, 1959	September 9, 1959	September 10, 1959	December 31, 1981	May 22, 1997
41	Harry Blackmun	Eighth	August 18, 1959	September 14, 1959	September 21, 1959	June 8, 1970	Elevated
42	Charles Merton Merrill	Ninth	August 27, 1959	September 14, 1959	September 21, 1959	October 8, 1974	March 29, 1996
43	Montgomery Oliver Koelsch	Ninth	September 12, 1959	September 14, 1959	September 23, 1959	January 31, 1976	September 1, 1992
44	Clifford Patrick O'Sullivan	Sixth	January 14, 1960	March 10, 1960	March 12, 1960	September 27, 1969	October 7, 1975
45	J. Joseph Smith	Second	August 27, 1959 (Note: Renominated on January 11, 1960.)	September 1, 1960	September 2, 1960	November 6, 1971	February 16, 1980

== District courts ==
#	Judge	Court (Note: See List of United States district and territorial courts)	Nomination date	Confirmation date	Began active service	Ended active service	Ended senior status
1	Lester LeFevre Cecil	S.D. Ohio	April 1, 1953	April 23, 1953	April 23, 1953	July 28, 1959	Elevated
2	Walter Bruchhausen	E.D.N.Y	April 18, 1953	May 7, 1953	May 8, 1953	May 20, 1967	October 11, 1976
3	Julius Hoffman	N.D. Ill.	April 27, 1953	May 13, 1953	May 14, 1953	February 3, 1972	July 1, 1983
4	Winfred George Knoch	N.D. Ill.	April 27, 1953	May 13, 1953	May 14, 1953	September 14, 1958	Elevated
5	George Hugo Boldt	W.D. Wash.	June 10, 1953	July 14, 1953	July 14, 1953	October 30, 1971	March 18, 1984
6	Joseph Putnam Willson	W.D. Pa.	June 8, 1953	July 14, 1953	July 14, 1953	October 18, 1968	August 3, 1998
7	Benjamin C. Dawkins Jr.	W.D. La.	July 21, 1953	July 31, 1953	August 3, 1953	August 6, 1973	August 31, 1984
8	Harlan Hobart Grooms	N.D. Ala.	July 23, 1953	July 31, 1953	August 3, 1953	February 3, 1969	August 23, 1991
9	Oliver Deveta Hamlin Jr.	N.D. Cal.	July 23, 1953	August 1, 1953	August 3, 1953	April 15, 1958	Elevated
10	Edwin F. Hunter	W.D. La.	January 11, 1954	February 9, 1954	October 3, 1953	February 19, 1976	February 22, 2002
11	Edward William Day	D.R.I.	January 11, 1954	February 9, 1954	November 10, 1953	March 19, 1976	October 22, 1985
12	George T. Mickelson	D.S.D.	January 11, 1954	February 9, 1954	December 9, 1953	February 28, 1965	–
13	Bailey Aldrich	D. Mass.	April 1, 1954	April 23, 1954	April 27, 1954	September 14, 1959	Elevated
14	Robert P. Anderson	D. Conn.	April 6, 1954	April 23, 1954	April 27, 1954	August 20, 1964	Elevated
15	Jean Sala Breitenstein	D. Colo.	April 6, 1954	April 23, 1954	April 27, 1954	July 9, 1957	Elevated
16	Archie Owen Dawson	S.D.N.Y.	April 6, 1954	April 23, 1954	April 27, 1954	August 3, 1964	–
17	Lawrence Walsh	S.D.N.Y.	April 6, 1954	April 27, 1954	April 28, 1954	December 29, 1957	–
18	Alexander Bicks	S.D.N.Y.	April 6, 1954	May 11, 1954	May 12, 1954	May 9, 1963	–
19	Edmund Louis Palmieri	S.D.N.Y.	April 6, 1954	May 11, 1954	May 12, 1954	June 30, 1972	June 15, 1989
20	Roszel Cathcart Thomsen	D. Md.	March 15, 1954	May 11, 1954	May 12, 1954	January 31, 1971	March 11, 1992
21	Waldo Henry Rogers	D.N.M.	May 3, 1954	May 13, 1954	May 15, 1954	January 12, 1964	–
22	John Rolly Ross	D. Nev.	May 3, 1954	May 13, 1954	May 15, 1954	April 22, 1963	–
23	William Augustus Bootle	M.D. Ga.	May 3, 1954	May 18, 1954	May 20, 1954	March 11, 1972	January 25, 2005
24	John W. Lord Jr.	E.D. Pa.	March 29, 1954	May 18, 1954	May 20, 1954	December 19, 1971	May 16, 1972
25	John Lester Miller	W.D. Pa.	March 29, 1954	May 18, 1954	May 20, 1954	October 1, 1971	July 20, 1978
26	Albert Sherman Christensen	D. Utah	May 12, 1954	May 27, 1954	May 28, 1954	August 17, 1971	August 13, 1996
27	Ralph M. Freeman	E.D. Mich.	May 10, 1954	June 8, 1954	June 10, 1954	July 1, 1973	March 29, 1990
28	W. Wallace Kent	W.D. Mich.	May 10, 1954	June 8, 1954	June 10, 1954	January 6, 1971	Elevated
29	Charles Evans Whittaker	W.D. Mo.	May 11, 1954	July 7, 1954	July 8, 1954	June 21, 1956	Elevated
30	Walter Edward Hoffman	E.D. Va.	June 29, 1954	July 14, 1954	July 15, 1954	September 3, 1974	November 21, 1996
31	Emett Clay Choate	S.D. Fla.	June 22, 1954	July 20, 1954	July 20, 1954	January 31, 1965	August 14, 1974
32	Fredrick Monroe Taylor	D. Idaho	July 9, 1954	July 20, 1954	July 20, 1954	December 15, 1971	February 16, 1988
33	Herbert Stephenson Boreman	N.D. W. Va.	June 22, 1954	July 21, 1954	July 22, 1954	June 22, 1959	Elevated
34	Cale James Holder	S.D. Ind.	August 2, 1954	August 6, 1954	August 6, 1954	August 23, 1983	–
35	Joe McDonald Ingraham	S.D. Tex.	May 10, 1954	August 6, 1954	August 6, 1954	December 31, 1969	Elevated
36	William Lynn Parkinson	N.D. Ind.	August 2, 1954	August 6, 1954	August 6, 1954	September 9, 1957	Elevated
37	James C. Connell	N.D. Ohio	June 24, 1954	August 10, 1954	August 10, 1954	September 21, 1971	October 30, 1973
38	Henry Luesing Brooks	W.D. Ky.	August 16, 1954	August 18, 1954	August 21, 1954	December 12, 1969	Elevated
39	Sherrill Halbert	N.D. Cal. / E.D. Cal.	August 19, 1954	August 20, 1954	August 26, 1954	September 30, 1969	May 31, 1991
40	Lamar John Ryan Cecil	E.D. Tex.	August 19, 1954	December 2, 1954	August 31, 1954	February 14, 1958	–
41	Joseph Charles McGarraghy	D.D.C.	November 10, 1954	December 2, 1954	December 3, 1954	December 17, 1967	November 29, 1975
42	Edward Devitt	D. Minn.	November 16, 1954	February 4, 1955	December 10, 1954	May 1, 1981	March 2, 1992
43	William Ernest Miller	M.D. Tenn.	August 16, 1954 (Note: Renominated on November 16, 1954, and January 21, 1955.)	March 14, 1955	March 16, 1955	July 8, 1970	Elevated
44	Gilbert H. Jertberg	S.D. Cal.	January 21, 1955	March 14, 1955	March 16, 1955	September 1, 1958	Elevated
45	William G. East	D. Ore.	May 2, 1955	June 7, 1955	June 8, 1955	April 10, 1967	April 27, 1985
46	Reynier Jacob Wortendyke Jr.	D.N.J.	April 18, 1955	June 7, 1955	June 8, 1955	June 1, 1970	December 26, 1975
47	Kenneth Philip Grubb	E.D. Wis.	May 13, 1955	June 15, 1955	June 16, 1955	October 8, 1965	–
48	Ronald Davies	D.N.D.	June 21, 1955	July 22, 1955	July 27, 1955	August 27, 1971	April 18, 1996
49	George Scott Register	D.N.D.	June 21, 1955	July 22, 1955	July 27, 1955	December 22, 1971	March 18, 1972
50	Caleb Merrill Wright	D. Del.	July 1, 1955	July 19, 1955	July 27, 1955	October 8, 1973	May 12, 2001
51	Joe Ewing Estes	N.D. Tex.	July 18, 1955	July 28, 1955	August 1, 1955	July 1, 1972	October 24, 1989
52	John Wilson McIlvaine	W.D. Pa.	May 20, 1955	July 29, 1955	August 1, 1955	July 1, 1963	–
53	Herbert Peter Sorg	W.D. Pa.	May 20, 1955	July 29, 1955	August 1, 1955	December 20, 1976	March 11, 1979
54	Francis Lund Van Dusen	E.D. Pa.	March 29, 1954 (Note: Renominated on March 20, 1955.)	July 29, 1955	August 1, 1955	June 26, 1967	Elevated
55	Thurmond Clarke	S.D. Cal. / C.D. Cal.	June 21, 1955	August 1, 1955	August 3, 1955	September 1, 1970	February 28, 1971
56	Robert Dorsey Watkins	D. Md.	July 30, 1955	March 1, 1956	August 12, 1955	August 11, 1971	March 19, 1986
57	William Bernard Herlands	S.D.N.Y.	May 11, 1955	June 26, 1956	August 12, 1955	August 28, 1969	–
58	Charles William Kraft Jr.	E.D. Pa.	May 20, 1955	March 28, 1956	August 12, 1955	November 11, 1970	January 18, 2002
59	Joseph Patrick Lieb	S.D. Fla. / M.D. Fla.	July 30, 1955	March 1, 1956	August 13, 1955	November 2, 1971	–
60	John M. Cashin	S.D.N.Y.	January 12, 1956	March 1, 1956	August 17, 1955	October 1, 1965	October 21, 1970
61	Ewing Thomas Kerr	D. Wyo.	January 12, 1956	March 1, 1956	October 22, 1955	September 26, 1975	July 1, 1992
62	Frank Minis Johnson	M.D. Ala.	January 12, 1956	January 31, 1956	October 22, 1955	July 12, 1979	Elevated
63	Richard Harrington Levet	S.D.N.Y.	January 26, 1956	March 6, 1956	March 8, 1956	July 1, 1966	May 3, 1976
64	Justin C. Morgan	W.D.N.Y.	August 1, 1955 (Note: Renominated on January 25, 1956.)	March 6, 1956	March 8, 1956	May 24, 1959	–
65	Paul Charles Weick	N.D. Ohio	February 27, 1956	March 28, 1956	March 29, 1956	October 7, 1959	Elevated
66	Ross Rizley	W.D. Okla.	February 10, 1956	March 1, 1956	April 13, 1956	March 4, 1969	–
67	Frederick van Pelt Bryan	S.D.N.Y.	May 18, 1956	June 13, 1956	June 19, 1956	April 1, 1972	April 17, 1978
68	Frederick Olen Mercer	S.D. Ill.	May 17, 1956	June 13, 1956	June 19, 1956	April 3, 1966	–
69	William George Juergens	E.D. Ill. / S.D. Ill.	June 7, 1956	June 21, 1956	June 22, 1956	April 26, 1972	December 7, 1988
70	Richard Earl Robinson	D. Neb.	June 21, 1956	July 2, 1956	July 3, 1956	January 7, 1972	January 28, 1991
71	Randle Jasper Smith	W.D. Mo.	June 5, 1956	July 2, 1956	July 3, 1956	January 8, 1962	–
72	Randolph Henry Weber	E.D. Mo.	February 4, 1957	March 14, 1957	March 14, 1957	November 23, 1961	–
73	William James Jameson	D. Mont.	March 5, 1957	March 26, 1957	March 28, 1957	February 27, 1969	October 8, 1990
74	John Sirica	D.D.C.	February 25, 1957	March 26, 1957	March 28, 1957	October 31, 1977	August 14, 1992
75	Caleb Rodney Layton III	D. Del.	March 25, 1957	April 16, 1957	April 17, 1957	April 26, 1968	May 6, 1988
76	Robert Van Pelt	D. Neb.	May 22, 1957	June 11, 1957	June 13, 1957	May 5, 1970	April 27, 1988
77	Alfred A. Arraj	D. Colo.	July 2, 1957	August 5, 1957	August 6, 1957	August 31, 1976	October 23, 1992
78	Clifford Patrick O'Sullivan	E.D. Mich.	June 6, 1957	August 5, 1957	August 7, 1957	April 4, 1960	Elevated
79	Joseph Carmine Zavatt	E.D.N.Y.	June 21, 1957	August 5, 1957	August 7, 1957	December 31, 1970	August 31, 1985
80	Edwin Richley Hicklin	S.D. Iowa	July 16, 1957	August 15, 1957	August 16, 1957	January 27, 1960	September 19, 1963
81	Thomas C. Egan	E.D. Pa.	August 7, 1957	August 22, 1957	August 26, 1957	July 6, 1961	–
82	Edward Thaxter Gignoux	D. Me.	August 9, 1957	August 22, 1957	August 26, 1957	June 1, 1983	November 4, 1988
83	Robert A. Grant	N.D. Ind.	August 21, 1957	August 22, 1957	August 26, 1957	December 1, 1972	March 2, 1998
84	Roby C. Thompson	W.D. Va.	August 16, 1957	August 28, 1957	August 30, 1957	July 29, 1960	–
85	Edwin Monroe Stanley	M.D.N.C.	January 13, 1958	February 25, 1958	October 23, 1957	December 23, 1971	–
86	Julius Howard Miner	N.D. Ill.	January 23, 1958	February 25, 1958	February 27, 1958	March 13, 1963	–
87	Axel J. Beck	D.S.D.	January 31, 1958	February 28, 1958	March 4, 1958	October 27, 1969	September 2, 1981
88	Claude Feemster Clayton	N.D. Miss.	February 24, 1958	March 4, 1958	March 12, 1958	November 23, 1967	Elevated
89	G. Harrold Carswell	N.D. Fla.	March 6, 1958	March 31, 1958	April 10, 1958	June 27, 1969	Elevated
90	Mendon Morrill	D.N.J.	March 25, 1958	April 22, 1958	April 23, 1958	March 12, 1961	–
91	Edwin DeHaven Steel Jr.	D. Del.	March 26, 1958	April 22, 1958	April 23, 1958	December 30, 1969	July 26, 1986
92	Albert Charles Wollenberg	N.D. Cal.	April 24, 1958	May 15, 1958	May 19, 1958	April 30, 1975	April 19, 1981
93	Arthur Jehu Stanley Jr.	D. Kan.	June 25, 1958	July 3, 1958	July 7, 1958	April 1, 1971	January 27, 2001
94	Lloyd Hudson Burke	N.D. Cal.	June 27, 1958	July 21, 1958	July 21, 1958	March 15, 1988	–
95	Omer Poos	S.D. Ill.	August 16, 1958	August 19, 1958	August 21, 1958	August 31, 1973	August 11, 1976
96	George Luzerne Hart Jr.	D.D.C.	April 16, 1958 (Note: Renominated on January 17, 1959.)	September 9, 1959	August 29, 1958	May 16, 1979	May 21, 1984
97	Edwin Albert Robson	N.D. Ill.	January 17, 1959	April 29, 1959	September 29, 1958	April 16, 1975	October 21, 1986
98	J. Smith Henley	E.D. Ark.	February 24, 1958	–	October 25, 1958	September 8, 1959	–
98.1	J. Smith Henley	E.D. Ark. W.D. Ark.	August 18, 1959	September 2, 1959	September 8, 1959	March 24, 1975	Elevated
99	Charles Lawrence Powell	E.D. Wash.	May 26, 1959	June 16, 1959	June 17, 1959	April 21, 1972	August 17, 1975
100	John R. Bartels	E.D.N.Y.	April 20, 1959	July 28, 1959	July 30, 1959	December 31, 1973	February 13, 1997
101	John Kilkenny	D. Ore.	February 19, 1959	July 28, 1959	July 30, 1959	September 26, 1969	Elevated
102	Theodore Roosevelt Dalton	W.D. Va.	July 21, 1959	August 12, 1959	August 13, 1959	October 12, 1976	October 30, 1989
103	John A. Field Jr.	S.D. W. Va.	May 11, 1959	August 12, 1959	August 13, 1959	October 7, 1971	Elevated
104	Algernon Lee Butler	E.D.N.C.	July 28, 1959	August 28, 1959	August 31, 1959	August 2, 1975	September 5, 1978
105	Carl Andrew Weinman	S.D. Ohio	July 28, 1959	September 2, 1959	September 8, 1959	March 1, 1973	February 5, 1979
106	Gordon Elmo Young	E.D. Ark.	August 18, 1959	September 2, 1959	September 10, 1959	August 20, 1969	–
107	Joseph Jefferson Fisher	E.D. Tex.	September 7, 1959	September 9, 1959	September 10, 1959	January 30, 1984	June 19, 2000
108	Anthony Julian	D. Mass.	February 26, 1959	September 9, 1959	September 10, 1959	August 1, 1972	January 18, 1984
109	Fred Kunzel	S.D. Cal.	February 16, 1959	September 9, 1959	September 10, 1959	November 19, 1969	–
110	Lloyd Francis MacMahon	S.D.N.Y.	March 10, 1959	September 9, 1959	September 10, 1959	May 31, 1982	April 8, 1989
111	Charles Miller Metzner	S.D.N.Y.	April 15, 1959	September 9, 1959	September 10, 1959	September 30, 1977	November 30, 2009
112	Harold Kenneth Wood	E.D. Pa.	March 2, 1959	September 9, 1959	September 10, 1959	June 24, 1971	December 17, 1972
113	Leonard Patrick Walsh	D.D.C.	February 26, 1959	September 9, 1959	September 14, 1959	October 5, 1971	February 13, 1980
114	Myron Donovan Crocker	S.D. Cal. / E.D. Cal.	February 16, 1959	September 14, 1959	September 21, 1959	January 1, 1981	February 2, 2010
115	John Oliver Henderson	W.D.N.Y.	August 21, 1959	September 14, 1959	September 21, 1959	February 19, 1974	–
116	Girard Edward Kalbfleisch	N.D. Ohio	August 21, 1959	September 14, 1959	September 21, 1959	September 30, 1970	April 1, 1990
117	William Thomas Sweigert	N.D. Cal.	April 23, 1959	September 14, 1959	September 21, 1959	November 30, 1973	February 16, 1983
118	Walter Hartman Hodge	D. Alaska	January 14, 1960	February 18, 1960	February 19, 1960	August 30, 1966	July 12, 1975
119	Olin Hatfield Chilson	D. Colo.	February 19, 1960	March 1, 1960	March 5, 1960	December 31, 1973	September 28, 1991
120	Charles Ferguson Paul	N.D. W. Va.	August 3, 1959	March 1, 1960	March 5, 1960	February 17, 1965	–
121	Oren Ritter Lewis	E.D. Va.	March 21, 1960	May 31, 1960	May 31, 1960	January 1, 1974	June 12, 1983
122	Roy Laverne Stephenson	S.D. Iowa	May 16, 1960	May 26, 1960	May 31, 1960	July 6, 1971	Elevated
123	Frederick William Kaess	E.D. Mich.	June 10, 1960	July 2, 1960	July 6, 1960	December 13, 1975	March 30, 1979
124	Jacob Mishler	E.D.N.Y.	June 10, 1960	July 2, 1960	July 6, 1960	April 30, 1980	January 26, 2004
125	Arthur Stephen Lane	D.N.J.	June 17, 1960	August 27, 1960	August 30, 1960	July 15, 1967	–
126	William H. Timbers	D. Conn.	August 27, 1959	September 1, 1960	September 2, 1960	August 6, 1971	Elevated
127	Andrew A. Caffrey	D. Mass.	July 1, 1960 (Note: Renominated on January 10, 1961.)	August 9, 1961	October 13, 1960	October 17, 1986	October 6, 1993
128	John Feikens	E.D. Mich.	June 10, 1960	–	October 13, 1960	September 27, 1961	–
129	Cyrus Nils Tavares	D. Haw.	January 14, 1960	September 21, 1961	October 13, 1960	April 12, 1972	August 3, 1976

== Specialty courts ==
=== United States Court of Customs and Patent Appeals ===
The United States Court of Customs and Patent Appeals became an Article III Court on August 25, 1958.

==== Judges appointed under Article III ====
#	Judge	Nomination date	Confirmation date	Began active service	Ended active service	Ended senior status
1	Arthur Mumford Smith	March 25, 1959	April 29, 1959	April 30, 1959	November 20, 1968	–
2	Eugene Worley	March 25, 1959	April 29, 1959	April 30, 1959	June 26, 1972	December 17, 1974

==== Judges appointed under Article I ====
#	Judge	Nomination date	Confirmation date	Began active service	Ended active service	Ended senior status
1	Noble J. Johnson	May 17, 1956	July 19, 1956	July 19, 1956	August 7, 1958	March 17, 1968
2	Giles Rich	May 17, 1956	July 19, 1956	July 19, 1956	June 9, 1999	–
3	Isaac Jack Martin	July 18, 1958	August 5, 1958	August 6, 1958	November 5, 1966	–

=== United States Court of Claims ===
The United States Court of Claims became an Article III Court on July 28, 1953.

==== Judges appointed under Article III ====
#	Judge	Nomination date	Confirmation date	Began active service	Ended active service	Ended senior status
1	Don Nelson Laramore	February 15, 1954	March 16, 1954	March 17, 1954	January 17, 1972	August 9, 1989
2	James Randall Durfee	August 25, 1959	April 20, 1960	April 22, 1960	January 6, 1972	October 29, 1977

=== United States Customs Court ===
The United States Customs Court became an Article III Court on July 14, 1956.

==== Judges appointed under Article III ====
#	Judge	Nomination date	Confirmation date	Began active service	Ended active service	Ended senior status
1	Scovel Richardson	March 4, 1957	April 4, 1957	April 8, 1957	March 30, 1982	–

==== Judges appointed under Article I ====
#	Judge	Nomination date	Confirmation date	Began active service	Ended active service	Ended senior status
1	David John Wilson	July 7, 1954	July 24, 1954	July 26, 1954	April 1, 1966	April 23, 1976
2	Mary H. Donlon	June 22, 1955	July 29, 1955	August 1, 1955	October 1, 1966	March 5, 1977

== Notes ==
Renominations

== Sources ==
- Federal Judicial Center
