= Jennings Bailey =

American judge (1867–1963)

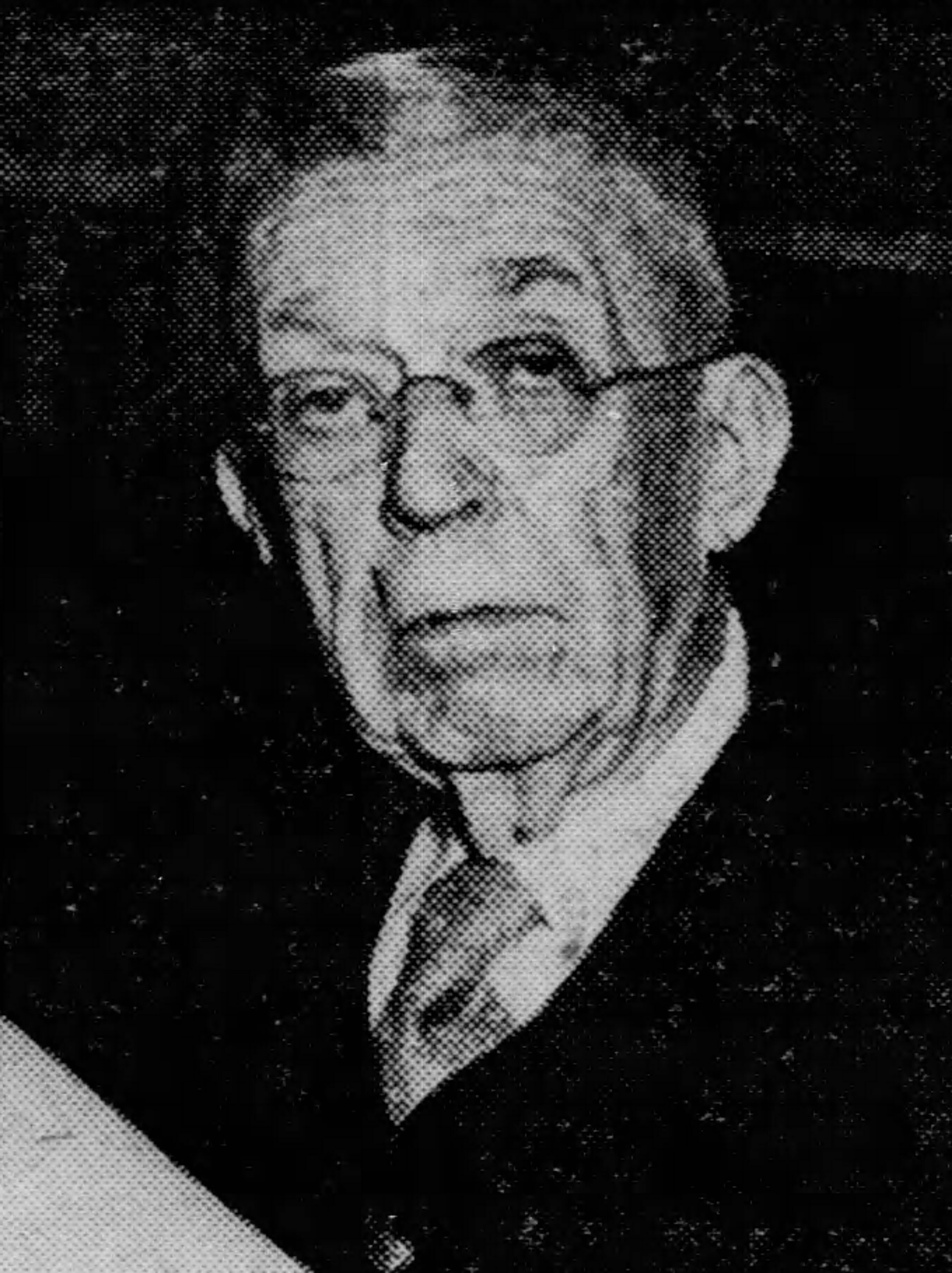

Senior Judge of the United States District Court for the District of Columbia
- In office November 1, 1950 – January 9, 1963

Judge of the United States District Court for the District of Columbia
- In office May 22, 1918 – November 1, 1950
- Appointed by: Woodrow Wilson
- Preceded by: Walter I. McCoy
- Succeeded by: Walter M. Bastian

Personal details
- Born: Thomas Jennings Bailey; June 6, 1867 Nashville, Tennessee, U.S.
- Died: January 9, 1963 (aged 95) Washington, D.C., U.S.
- Education: Southwestern University (AB, AM); Vanderbilt University (LLB)

Thomas Jennings Bailey (June 6, 1867 – January 9, 1963) was a United States district judge of the United States District Court for the District of Columbia.

== Early life ==
Born in Nashville, Tennessee. He was the son of Elizabeth Margaret Lusk and Senator James E. Bailey. He attended the Emerson Institute.

Bailey received an Artium Baccalaureus degree from Southwestern University in 1884, an Artium Magister degree from the same institution in 1885. He received a Bachelor of Laws from Vanderbilt University in 1890. He also attended Harvard University.

== Career ==
He was in private practice in Seattle, Tennessee from 1893 to 1896, then in Clarksville, Tennessee until 1900, and then in Nashville from 1902 to 1918. He was a special commissioner in 1915, and was a deputy clerk and master in chancery in Nashville from 1915 to 1918.

=== Federal judicial service ===
Bailey was nominated by President Woodrow Wilson on May 16, 1918, to an Associate Justice seat on the Supreme Court of the District of Columbia (District Court of the United States for the District of Columbia from June 25, 1936. He was a Judge of the United States District Court for the District of Columbia from June 25, 1948). He was confirmed by the United States Senate on May 22, 1918, and received his commission the same day. He assumed senior status on November 1, 1950 and served in that capacity until his death in 1963.

== Personal life ==
In 1898, Bailey married Lucy O'Bryan of Nashville. They had four children: Elizabeth Bailey, Lucy Bailey, George Bailey, and Thomas Jennings Bailey Jr. He belonged to the Cosmos Club and the Kirkside Golf Club.

He died in Washington, D.C.

== See also ==
- List of United States federal judges by longevity of service

Legal offices
| Preceded by Walter I. McCoy | Judge of the United States District Court for the District of Columbia; 1918–1950 | Succeeded by Walter M. Bastian |
