= Randle Jasper Smith =

American judge

Chief Judge of the United States District Court for the Western District of Missouri
- In office 1961–1962
- Preceded by: Albert Alphonso Ridge
- Succeeded by: Floyd Robert Gibson

Judge of the United States District Court for the Western District of Missouri
- In office July 3, 1956 – January 8, 1962
- Appointed by: Dwight D. Eisenhower
- Preceded by: Charles Evans Whittaker
- Succeeded by: John Watkins Oliver

Personal details
- Born: Randle Jasper Smith; July 25, 1908 Campbell, Missouri, U.S.
- Died: January 8, 1962 (aged 53)
- Education: University of Missouri (A.B.)

Randle Jasper Smith (July 25, 1908 – January 8, 1962) was a United States district judge of the United States District Court for the Western District of Missouri.

== Education and career ==
Born in Campbell, Missouri, Smith received an Artium Baccalaureus degree from the University of Missouri in 1931. He was in private practice in Springfield, Missouri from 1931 to 1956. He was a member of the Missouri Senate from 1943 to 1954.

== Federal judicial service ==
On June 5, 1956, Smith was nominated by President Dwight D. Eisenhower to a seat on the United States District Court for the Western District of Missouri vacated by Judge Charles Evans Whittaker. Smith was confirmed by the United States Senate on July 2, 1956, and received his commission the next day. He served as Chief Judge from 1961 until his death on January 8, 1962.

== Sources ==
Legal offices
| Preceded by Charles Evans Whittaker | Judge of the United States District Court for the Western District of Missouri; 1956–1962 | Succeeded by John Watkins Oliver |
| Preceded by Albert Alphonso Ridge | Chief Judge of the United States District Court for the Western District of Missouri; 1961–1962 | Succeeded by Floyd Robert Gibson |
