= Donald P. Lay =

American judge (1926–2007)

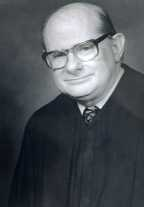

Senior Judge of the United States Court of Appeals for the Eighth Circuit
- In office January 7, 1992 – April 29, 2007

Chief Judge of the United States Court of Appeals for the Eighth Circuit
- In office 1979–1992
- Preceded by: Floyd Robert Gibson
- Succeeded by: Richard S. Arnold

Judge of the United States Court of Appeals for the Eighth Circuit
- In office July 22, 1966 – January 7, 1992
- Appointed by: Lyndon B. Johnson
- Preceded by: Harvey M. Johnsen
- Succeeded by: Morris S. Arnold

Personal details
- Born: Donald Pomery Lay; August 24, 1926 Princeton, Illinois, U.S.
- Died: April 29, 2007 (aged 80) North Oaks, Minnesota, U.S.
- Education: University of Iowa (BA, JD)

Donald Pomery Lay (August 24, 1926 – April 29, 2007) was a United States circuit judge of the United States Court of Appeals for the Eighth Circuit.

== Education and career ==
Born in Princeton, Illinois, Lay received a Bachelor of Arts degree from the University of Iowa in 1949. He received a Juris Doctor from the University of Iowa College of Law in 1951. He was a United States Navy seaman from 1944 to 1945. He was in private practice of law in Omaha, Nebraska, from 1951 to 1953. He was in private practice of law in Milwaukee, Wisconsin, from 1953 to 1954. He was in private practice of law in Omaha from 1954 to 1966. He was an instructor at the Omaha University School of Law from 1956 to 1957 and at William Mitchell College of Law in 1983. Lay was a Professor at University of Minnesota Law School from 1983 to 2007.

== Federal judicial service ==
Lay was nominated by President Lyndon B. Johnson on July 11, 1966, to a seat on the United States Court of Appeals for the Eighth Circuit vacated by Judge Harvey M. Johnsen. He was confirmed by the United States Senate on July 22, 1966, and received his commission the same day. He served as Chief Judge and as a member of the Judicial Conference of the United States from 1979 to 1992. He assumed senior status on January 7, 1992. His service was terminated on April 29, 2007, due to his death.

== Other service ==
Concurrent with his federal judicial service, Lay served as a full-time visiting faculty member at William Mitchell College of Law and as a professor at the University of Minnesota Law School from 1983 to 2007. Lay died on April 29, 2007, at his home in North Oaks, Minnesota.

== Notable cases ==
One of Lay's most notable rulings was Jenson v. Eveleth Taconite Co., a landmark sexual harassment case that was the subject of the 2005 film North Country. The Supreme Court of the United States agreed with his 1971 dissent on behalf of two Iowa convicts whose parole was revoked without trial in Morrissey v. Brewer and his dissent in Jaycees v. McClure, which compelled the Jaycees to admit women.

Lay dissented in United States v. $124,700 in U.S. Currency, a case that still stands, upholding the civil forfeiture of properties possibly connected to drugs.

== Sources ==
Legal offices
| Preceded by Harvey M. Johnsen | Judge of the United States Court of Appeals for the Eighth Circuit; 1966–1992 | Succeeded by Morris S. Arnold |
| Preceded by Floyd Robert Gibson | Chief Judge of the United States Court of Appeals for the Eighth Circuit; 1979–1992 | Succeeded by Richard S. Arnold |
