= Arba Seymour Van Valkenburgh =

American judge (1862–1944)

Senior Judge of the United States Court of Appeals for the Eighth Circuit
- In office May 1, 1933 – November 4, 1944

Judge of the United States Court of Appeals for the Eighth Circuit
- In office March 18, 1925 – May 1, 1933
- Appointed by: Calvin Coolidge
- Preceded by: Seat established by 43 Stat. 1116
- Succeeded by: Joseph William Woodrough

Judge of the United States District Court for the Western District of Missouri
- In office June 21, 1910 – March 18, 1925
- Appointed by: William Howard Taft
- Preceded by: John Finis Philips
- Succeeded by: Merrill E. Otis

Personal details
- Born: Arba Seymour Van Valkenburgh; August 22, 1862 Syracuse, New York, U.S.
- Education: University of Michigan (AB) read law

Arba Seymour Van Valkenburgh (August 22, 1862 – November 4, 1944) was a United States circuit judge of the United States Court of Appeals for the Eighth Circuit and previously was a United States District Court of the United States District Court for the Western District of Missouri.

Van Valkenburgh was nominated by President Calvin Coolidge on March 18, 1925, to a new seat created by 43 Stat. 1116; He was confirmed by the United States Senate on March 18, 1925, and received commission the same day. Assumed senior status on May 1, 1933. Van Valkenburgh's service was terminated on November 4, 1944, due to death.

== Education and career ==
Born on August 22, 1862, in Syracuse, New York, Van Valkenburg received an Artium Baccalaureus degree in 1884 from the University of Michigan and read law in 1888. He entered private practice in Kansas City, Missouri from 1888 to 1897. He was an Assistant United States Attorney for the Western District of Missouri from 1898 to 1905. He was the United States Attorney for the Western District of Missouri from 1905 to 1910.

== Federal judicial service ==
Van Valkenburgh was nominated by President William Howard Taft on June 14, 1910, to a seat on the United States District Court for the Western District of Missouri vacated by Judge John Finis Philips. He was confirmed by the United States Senate on June 21, 1910, and received his commission the same day. His service terminated on March 18, 1925, due to his elevation to the Eighth Circuit.

Van Valkenburgh was nominated by President Calvin Coolidge on March 18, 1925, to the United States Court of Appeals for the Eighth Circuit, to a new seat authorized by 43 Stat. 1116. He was confirmed by the Senate on March 18, 1925, and received his commission the same day. He assumed senior status on May 1, 1933. His service terminated on November 4, 1944, due to his death.

=== Notable District Court cases ===
- Smith vs. Kansas City Title & Trust Company, in which the Federal Farm Loan Act was sustained and the creation of land banks held valid, this ruling being affirmed by the U.S. Supreme Court (255 U.S. 180).
- Missouri vs. Holland, sustaining the Migratory Bird Treaty between the United States and Great Britain and the Act of Congress enforcing it (258 Fed. 479, affirmed 252 U.S. 416).
- Chicago, Burlington & Quincy Railroad vs. United States, involving the interpretation of the Federal Safety Appliance Act (affirmed 237 U.S. 410).
- United States vs. Emery, Bird, Thayer Dry Goods Company, involving the interpretation of the Federal Corporation Tax Law of 1909 (198 Fed. 242, affirmed 237 U.S. 28).
- St. Joseph Railway, Light & Power Company, vs. Public Service Commissions, which defined certain important principles of valuation of public utilities and the regulation of rates by public authorities (268 Fed. 267).

During World War I Van Valkenburg presided over a number of high-profile political cases. Van Valkenburg was the presiding judge at the trial of a young syndicalist activist from Kansas City named Earl Browder for refusal to register for the draft and conspiracy to interfere with same. Browder, later the General Secretary of the Communist Party USA, was sentenced by Van Valkenburgh to two years imprisonment, which he served at Bates County Jail in Butler, Missouri and Leavenworth Penitentiary.

Van Valkenburgh was also the judge who sentenced Carl Glesser, a naturalized American citizen of German birth and publisher of the Missouri Staats-Zeitung, to five years in Leavenworth after Glesser had pleaded guilty to violating the Espionage Act for thirteen articles he had published. Glesser began serving his sentence on April 30, 1918.

Van Valkenburgh presided over the May 1918 trial of socialist activist Rose Pastor Stokes for alleged violation of the Espionage Act through speaking against war profiteering. Although Stokes proclaimed that she had "at all times recognized the cause of our entrance into the war" and "at no time opposed the war," Stokes was found guilty at trial and Van Valkenburg delivered a draconian sentence of 10 years' imprisonment, declaring Stokes to be "part of a systematic program to create discontent with the war" and to advance the cause of revolution.

=== Notable Court of Appeals cases ===
- Wolf Bros. vs. Hamilton Brown Shoe Company, viewing important principles of the law of trademark and unfair competition (206 Fed. 611, affirmed 240 U.S. 251)
- United States vs. Utah Power & Light Company, involving public lands and water power rights (three opinions: 209 Fed. 554; 230 Fed. 328; 242 Fed. 924).
- Whitesides vs. Norton, which involved riparian rights and incidentally, the boundary line between Minnesota and Wisconsin (205 Fed. 5).

== Sources ==
- "Van Valkenburgh, Arba Seymour - Federal Judicial Center". www.fjc.gov.
- The National Cyclopædia of American Biography, Volume 33. New York: James T. White & Company, 1947; pp. 76–77.

Legal offices
Preceded by John Finis Philips	Judge of the United States District Court for the Western District of Missouri; 1910–1925	Succeeded by Merrill E. Otis
Preceded by Seat established by 43 Stat. 1116	Judge of the United States Court of Appeals for the Eighth Circuit; 1925–1933	Succeeded by Joseph William Woodrough
