= Albert Alphonso Ridge =

American judge (1898–1967)

Albert Alphonsus Ridge

Senior Judge of the United States Court of Appeals for the Eighth Circuit
- In office April 16, 1965 – March 2, 1967

Judge of the United States Court of Appeals for the Eighth Circuit
- In office June 15, 1961 – April 16, 1965
- Appointed by: John F. Kennedy
- Preceded by: Archibald K. Gardner
- Succeeded by: Floyd Robert Gibson

Chief Judge of the United States District Court for the Western District of Missouri
- In office 1959–1961
- Preceded by: Richard M. Duncan
- Succeeded by: Randle Jasper Smith

Judge of the United States District Court for the Western District of Missouri
- In office April 7, 1945 – June 29, 1961
- Appointed by: Franklin D. Roosevelt
- Preceded by: Merrill E. Otis
- Succeeded by: William H. Becker

Personal details
- Born: Albert Alphonsus Ridge; October 31, 1898 Nevada, Missouri, U.S.
- Died: March 2, 1967 (aged 68)
- Education: read law

Albert Alphonsus Ridge (October 31, 1898 – March 2, 1967) was a United States circuit judge of the United States Court of Appeals for the Eighth Circuit and previously was a United States district judge of the United States District Court for the Western District of Missouri.

== Education and career ==
Born in Nevada, Missouri, Ridge was in the United States Army from 1917 to 1919 and was a deputy clerk of Jackson County, Missouri from 1919 to 1921 before reading law to enter the bar in 1923. He was in private practice in Missouri from 1925 to 1934, and was a judge of the Circuit Court of Jackson County from 1935 to 1945.

== Federal judicial service ==
Ridge was nominated by President Franklin D. Roosevelt on March 12, 1945, to a seat on the United States District Court for the Western District of Missouri vacated by Judge Merrill E. Otis. He was confirmed by the United States Senate on April 3, 1945, and received his commission on April 7, 1945. He served as Chief Judge from 1959 to 1961. His service terminated on June 29, 1961, due to elevation to the Eighth Circuit.

Ridge was nominated by President John F. Kennedy on May 23, 1961, to a seat on the United States Court of Appeals for the Eighth Circuit vacated by Judge Archibald K. Gardner. He was confirmed by the Senate on June 14, 1961, and received his commission on June 15, 1961. He assumed senior status on April 16, 1965. His service terminated on March 2, 1967, due to his death.

== Sources ==
Legal offices
| Preceded by Merrill E. Otis | Judge of the United States District Court for the Western District of Missouri; 1945–1961 | Succeeded by William H. Becker |
| Preceded by Richard M. Duncan | Chief Judge of the United States District Court for the Western District of Missouri; 1959–1961 | Succeeded by Randle Jasper Smith |
| Preceded by Archibald K. Gardner | Judge of the United States Court of Appeals for the Eighth Circuit; 1961–1965 | Succeeded by Floyd Robert Gibson |
