= Joseph Charles McGarraghy =

American judge

Senior Judge of the United States District Court for the District of Columbia
- In office December 17, 1967 – November 29, 1975

Judge of the United States District Court for the District of Columbia
- In office December 3, 1954 – December 17, 1967
- Appointed by: Dwight D. Eisenhower
- Preceded by: Walter M. Bastian
- Succeeded by: Barrington D. Parker

Personal details
- Born: Joseph Charles McGarraghy; November 6, 1897 Washington, D.C., U.S.
- Died: November 29, 1975 (aged 78)
- Party: Republican
- Education: Georgetown Law (LL.B.)

Joseph Charles McGarraghy (November 6, 1897 – November 29, 1975) was a United States district judge of the United States District Court for the District of Columbia.

== Education and career ==
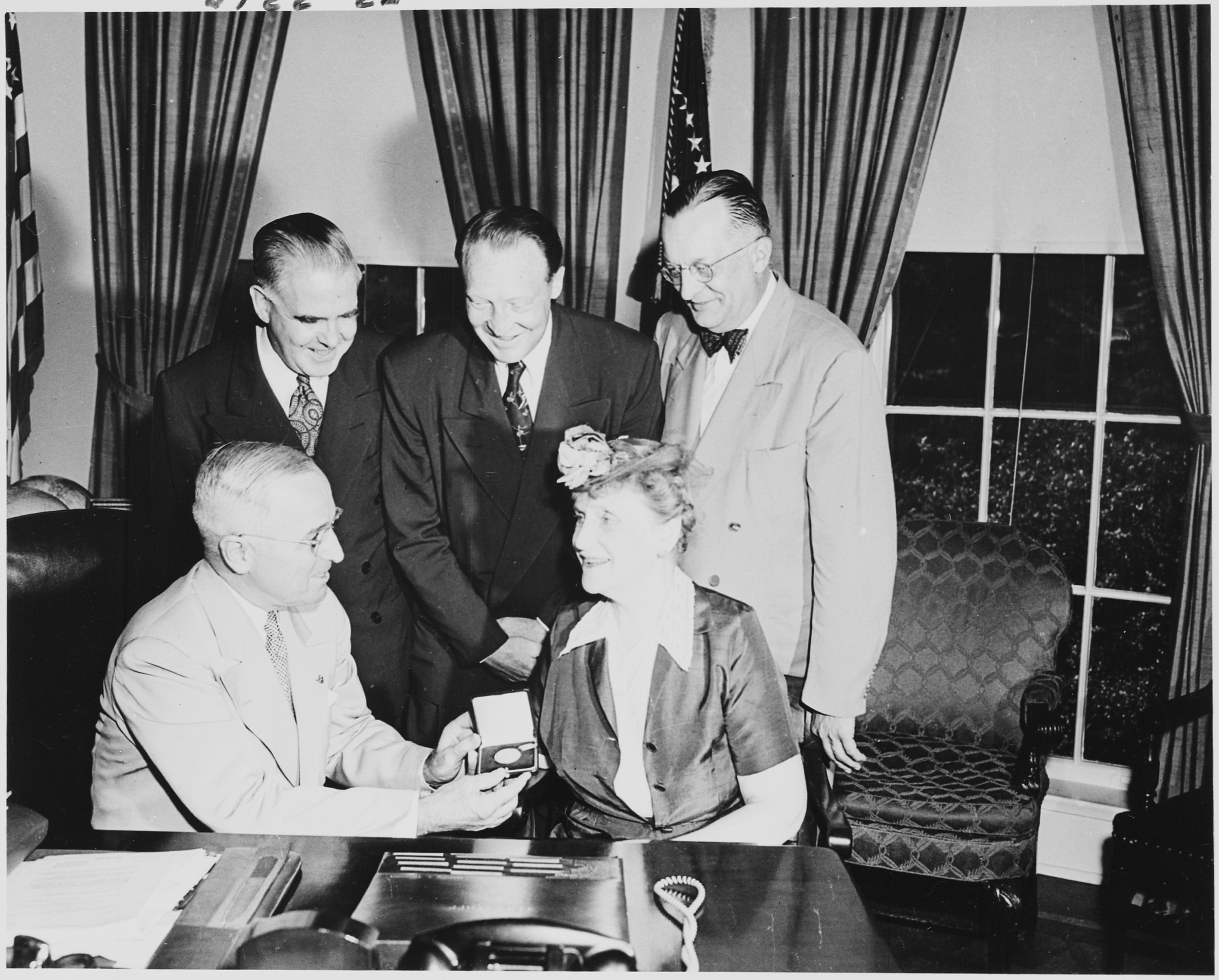
McGarraghy (left, behind Truman) in 1950

McGarraghy was born in Washington, D.C., and graduated from the Business High School. McGarraghy was in the engineering corps of the United States Army from 1917 to 1920 where he became an Army Field Clerk in 1918 and secretary in 1920. He received a Bachelor of Laws from Georgetown Law in 1921. He was an assistant corporation counsel from 1924 to 1925. He was in private practice in Washington, D.C., from 1925 to 1954. He was President of the Washington Board of Trade from 1946 to 1947. He was Chairman of the Greater National Capital Committee from 1947 to 1950. He was a Chairman of the Republican State Committee in Washington, D.C., from 1949 to 1954. He was Chairman of the Eisenhower-Nixon Inaugural Committee in 1953.

== Federal judicial service ==
McGarraghy was nominated by President Dwight D. Eisenhower on November 10, 1954, to a seat on the United States District Court for the District of Columbia vacated by Judge Walter M. Bastian. He was confirmed by the United States Senate on December 2, 1954, and received his commission the next day. He assumed senior status on December 17, 1967. His service terminated on November 29, 1975, due to his death.

== Sources ==
Legal offices
Preceded by Walter M. Bastian	Judge of the United States District Court for the District of Columbia; 1954–1967	Succeeded by Barrington D. Parker
