= United States Court of Appeals for the Eighth Circuit =

Current United States federal appellate court

- (8th Cir.)
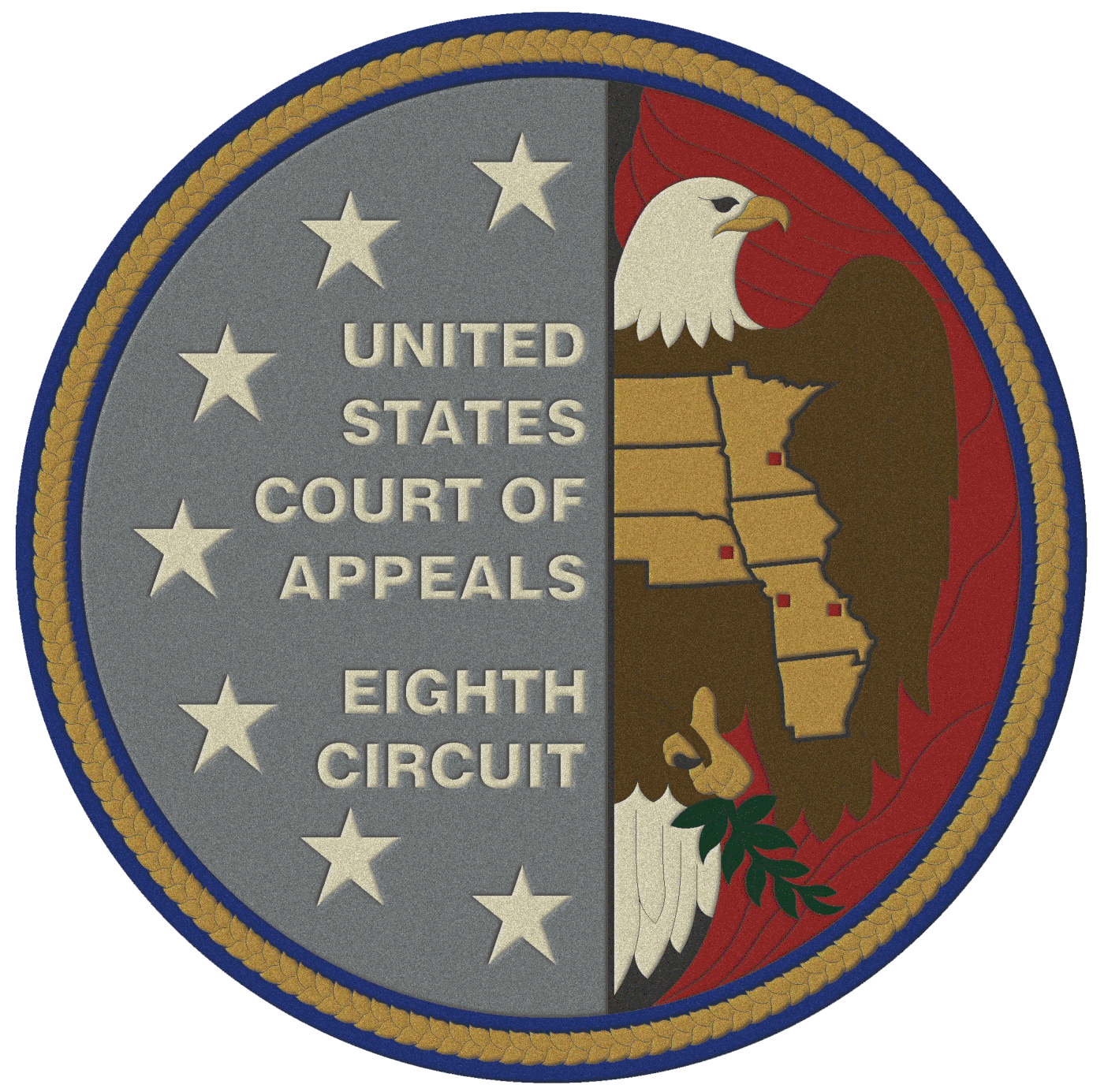

- Location: Thomas F. Eagleton United States Courthouse (St. Louis, Missouri) More locations: Warren E. Burger United States Courthouse (St. Paul, Minnesota)
- Appeals from: Eastern District of Arkansas; Western District of Arkansas; Northern District of Iowa; Southern District of Iowa; District of Minnesota; Eastern District of Missouri; Western District of Missouri; District of Nebraska; District of North Dakota; District of South Dakota
- Established: June 16, 1891
- Judges: 11
- Circuit Justice: Brett Kavanaugh
- Chief Judge: Steven Colloton
- www.ca8.uscourts.gov

The United States Court of Appeals for the Eighth Circuit (in case citations, 8th Cir.) is a United States federal court with appellate jurisdiction over the following United States district courts:

- Eastern District of Arkansas
- Western District of Arkansas
- Northern District of Iowa
- Southern District of Iowa
- District of Minnesota
- Eastern District of Missouri
- Western District of Missouri
- District of Nebraska
- District of North Dakota
- District of South Dakota

Created by the 25th United States Congress through passage of the Eighth and Ninth Circuits Act of 1837, the court is composed of 11 active judges. It is based primarily at the Thomas F. Eagleton United States Courthouse in St. Louis, Missouri, and secondarily at the Warren E. Burger United States Courthouse in St. Paul, Minnesota. It is one of 13 United States courts of appeals. In 1929, Congress passed a statute dividing the Eighth Circuit, placing Minnesota, Iowa, North Dakota, South Dakota, Nebraska, Missouri, and Arkansas in the Eighth Circuit and creating a Tenth Circuit that included Wyoming, Colorado, Utah, New Mexico, Kansas, and Oklahoma.

== Current composition of the court ==
As of October 23, 2026:

#	Title	Judge	Duty station	Born	Term of service			Appointed by
#	Title	Judge	Duty station	Born	Active	Chief	Senior	Appointed by
55	Chief Judge	Steven Colloton	Des Moines, IA	1963	2003–present	2024–present	—	G.W. Bush
46	Circuit Judge	James B. Loken	Minneapolis, MN	1940	1990–present	2003–2010	—	G.H.W. Bush
54	Circuit Judge	Lavenski Smith	Little Rock, AR	1958	2002–present	2017–2024	—	G.W. Bush
56	Circuit Judge	Raymond Gruender	Saint Louis, MO	1963	2004–present	—	—	G.W. Bush
58	Circuit Judge	Bobby Shepherd	El Dorado, AR	1951	2006–present	—	—	G.W. Bush
59	Circuit Judge	Jane L. Kelly	Cedar Rapids, IA	1964	2013–present	—	—	Obama
61	Circuit Judge	L. Steven Grasz	Omaha, NE	1961	2018–present	—	—	Trump
62	Circuit Judge	David Stras	Minneapolis, MN	1974	2018–present	—	—	Trump
63	Circuit Judge	Jonathan A. Kobes	Sioux Falls, SD	1974	2018–present	—	—	Trump
64	Circuit Judge	Justin D. Smith	Jefferson City, MO	1985	2026–present	—	—	Trump
65	Circuit Judge	Daniel M. Traynor	Bismarck, ND	1970	2026–present	—	—	Trump
42	Senior Judge	Pasco Bowman II	inactive	1933	1983–2003	1998–1999	2003–present	Reagan
43	Senior Judge	Roger Leland Wollman	inactive	1934	1985–2018	1999–2002	2018–present	Reagan
47	Senior Judge	David R. Hansen	inactive	1938	1991–2003	2002–2003	2003–present	G.H.W. Bush
48	Senior Judge	Morris S. Arnold	Little Rock, AR	1941	1992–2006	—	2006–present	G.H.W. Bush
57	Senior Judge	Duane Benton	Kansas City, MO	1950	2004–2026	—	2026–present	G.W. Bush
60	Senior Judge	Ralph R. Erickson	Fargo, ND	1959	2017–2026	—	2026–present	Trump

== Vacancies and pending nominations ==
Seat	Prior Judge's Duty Station	Seat last held by	Vacancy reason	Date of vacancy	Nominee	Date of nomination
8	El Dorado, AR	Bobby Shepherd	Senior status	TBD	J. Cody Hiland	November 10, 2026

== List of former judges ==
#	Judge	State	Born–died	Active service	Chief Judge	Senior status	Appointed by	Reason for termination
1	Henry Clay Caldwell	AR	1832–1915	1891–1903	—	—	B. Harrison / Operation of law	retirement
2	Walter Henry Sanborn	MN	1845–1928	1892–1928	—	—	B. Harrison	death
3	Amos Madden Thayer	MO	1841–1905	1894–1905	—	—	Cleveland	death
4	Willis Van Devanter	WY	1859–1941	1903–1910	—	—	T. Roosevelt	elevation
5	William Cather Hook	KS	1857–1921	1903–1921	—	—	T. Roosevelt	death
6	Elmer Bragg Adams	MO	1842–1916	1905–1916	—	—	T. Roosevelt	death
7	John Emmett Carland	SD	1853–1922	1911–1922	—	—		death
8	Walter I. Smith	IA	1862–1922	1911–1922	—	—	Taft	death
9	Kimbrough Stone	MO	1875–1958	1916–1947	—	1947–1958	Wilson	death
10	Robert E. Lewis	CO	1857–1941	1921–1929	—	—	Harding	reassignment
11	William Squire Kenyon	IA	1869–1933	1922–1933	—	—	Harding	death
12	Wilbur F. Booth	MN	1861–1944	1925–1932	—	1932–1944	Coolidge	death
13	Arba Van Valkenburgh	MO	1862–1944	1925–1933	—	1933–1944	Coolidge	death
14	John Hazelton Cotteral	OK	1864–1933	1928–1929	—	—	Coolidge	reassignment
15	Archibald K. Gardner	SD	1867–1962	1929–1960	1948–1959	1960–1962	Hoover	death
16	John B. Sanborn Jr.	MN	1883–1964	1932–1958	—	1959–1964	Hoover	death
17	Joseph Woodrough	NE	1873–1977	1933–1961	—	1961–1977	F. Roosevelt	death
18	Charles Faris	MO	1864–1938	1935	—	1935–1938	F. Roosevelt	death
19	Seth Thomas	IA	1873–1962	1935–1954	—	1954–1962	F. Roosevelt	death
20	Harvey M. Johnsen	NE	1895–1975	1940–1965	1959–1965	1965–1975	F. Roosevelt	death
21	Walter Garrett Riddick	AR	1883–1953	1941–1953	—	—	F. Roosevelt	death
22	John Caskie Collet	MO	1898–1955	1947–1955	—	—	Truman	death
23	Charles Joseph Vogel	ND	1898–1980	1954–1968	1965–1968	1968–1980	Eisenhower	death
24	Martin Van Oosterhout	IA	1900–1979	1954–1971	1968–1970	1971–1979	Eisenhower	death
25	Charles Evans Whittaker	MO	1901–1973	1956–1957	—	—	Eisenhower	elevation
26	Marion Charles Matthes	MO	1906–1980	1958–1973	1970–1973	1973–1980	Eisenhower	death
27	Harry Blackmun	MN	1908–1999	1959–1970	—	—	Eisenhower	elevation
28	Albert Alphonso Ridge	MO	1898–1967	1961–1965	—	1965–1967	Kennedy	death
29	Pat Mehaffy	AR	1904–1981	1963–1974	1973–1974	1974–1981	Kennedy	death
30	Floyd Robert Gibson	MO	1910–2001	1965–1979	1974–1979	1979–2001	L. Johnson	death
31	Donald P. Lay	MN	1926–2007	1966–1992	1979–1992	1992–2007	L. Johnson	death
32	Gerald Heaney	MN	1918–2010	1966–1988	—	1988–2006	L. Johnson	retirement
33	Myron H. Bright	ND	1919–2016	1968–1985	—	1985–2016	L. Johnson	death
34	Donald Roe Ross	NE	1922–2013	1970–1987	—	1987–2013	Nixon	death
35	Roy Laverne Stephenson	IA	1917–1982	1971–1982	—	1982–1982	Nixon	death
36	William H. Webster	MO	1924–2025	1973–1978	—	—	Nixon	resignation
37	J. Smith Henley	AR	1917–1997	1975–1982	—	1982–1997	Ford	death
38	Theodore McMillian	MO	1919–2006	1978–2003	—	2003–2006	Carter	death
39	Richard S. Arnold	AR	1936–2004	1980–2001	1992–1998	2001–2004	Carter	death
40	John R. Gibson	MO	1925–2014	1982–1994	—	1994–2014	Reagan	death
41	George Gardner Fagg	IA	1934–2015	1982–1999	—	1999–2015	Reagan	death
44	Frank J. Magill	ND	1927–2013	1986–1997	—	1997–2013	Reagan	death
45	C. Arlen Beam	NE	1930–2025	1987–2001	—	2001–2025	Reagan	death
49	Diana E. Murphy	MN	1934–2018	1994–2016	—	2016–2018	Clinton	death
50	John David Kelly	ND	1934–1998	1998	—	—	Clinton	death
51	Kermit Edward Bye	ND	1937–2021	2000–2015	—	2015–2016	Clinton	retirement
52	William J. Riley	NE	1947–2023	2001–2017	2010–2017	2017–2023	G.W. Bush	death
53	Michael Joseph Melloy	IA	1948–2026	2002–2013	—	2013–2026	G.W. Bush	death

== Chief judges ==
Chief Judge
Gardner	1948–1959
Johnsen	1959–1965
Vogel	1965–1968
Van Oosterhout	1968–1970
Matthes	1970–1973
Mehaffy	1973–1974
F. Gibson	1974–1979
Lay	1979–1992
R. Arnold	1992–1998
Bowman II	1998–1999
Wollman	1999–2002
Hansen	2002–2003
Loken	2003–2010
Riley	2010–2017
L. Smith	2017–2024
Colloton	2024–present

Chief judges have administrative responsibilities with respect to their circuits, and preside over any panel on which they serve, unless the circuit justice (the Supreme Court justice responsible for the circuit) is also on the panel. Unlike the Supreme Court, where one justice is specifically nominated to be chief, the office of chief judge rotates among the circuit judges.

To be chief, a judge must have been in active service on the court for at least one year, be under the age of 65, and have not previously served as chief judge. A vacancy is filled by the judge highest in seniority among the group of qualified judges, with seniority determined first by commission date, then by age. The chief judge serves for a term of seven years, or until age 70, whichever occurs first. If no judge qualifies to be chief, the youngest judge over the age of 65 who has served on the court for at least one year shall act as chief until another judge qualifies. If no judge has served on the court for more than a year, the most senior judge shall act as chief. Judges can forfeit or resign their chief judgeship or acting chief judgeship while retaining their active status as a circuit judge.

When the office was created in 1948, the chief judge was the longest-serving judge who had not elected to retire, on what has since 1958 been known as senior status, or declined to serve as chief judge. After August 6, 1959, judges could not become or remain chief after turning 70 years old. The current rules have been in operation since October 1, 1982.

== Succession of seats ==
The court has had thirteen seats for active judges. Two of these seats were reassigned to the United States Court of Appeals for the Tenth Circuit, leaving a eleven-seat court. The seats are numbered in the order in which they were initially filled. Judges who assume senior status enter a kind of retirement in which they remain on the bench but vacate their seats, thus allowing the U.S. President to appoint new judges to fill their seats.

Seat 1
Established on December 10, 1869, by the Judiciary Act of 1869 as a circuit judgeship for the Eighth Circuit
Reassigned to the United States Circuit Court of Appeals for the Eighth Circuit by the Judiciary Act of 1891
Caldwell	AR	1891–1903
Hook	KS	1903–1921
Lewis	CO	1921–1929
Reassigned on February 28, 1929, to the United States Circuit Court of Appeals for the Tenth Circuit by 45 Stat. 1346

Seat 2
Established on June 16, 1891, by the Judiciary Act of 1891
W. Sanborn	MN	1892–1928
Cotteral	OK	1928–1929
Reassigned on February 28, 1929, to the United States Circuit Court of Appeals for the Tenth Circuit by 45 Stat. 1346

Seat 3
Established on July 23, 1894, by 28 Stat. 115
Thayer	MO	1894–1905
Adams	MO	1905–1916
Stone	MO	1916–1947
Collet	MO	1947–1955
Whittaker	MO	1956–1957
Matthes	MO	1958–1973
Webster	MO	1973–1978
McMillian	MO	1978–2003
Benton	MO	2004–2026
J. Smith	MO	2026–present

Seat 4
Established on January 31, 1903, by 32 Stat. 791
Van Devanter	WY	1903–1910
W. Smith	IA	1911–1922
Kenyon	IA	1922–1933
Faris	MO	1935
Thomas	IA	1936–1954
Van Oosterhout	IA	1954–1971
Stephenson	IA	1971–1982
Fagg	IA	1982–1999
Melloy	IA	2002–2013
J.L. Kelly	IA	2013–present

Seat 5
Established on March 3, 1925, by 43 Stat. 1116
Booth	MN	1925–1932
J. Sanborn, Jr.	MN	1932–1959
Blackmun	MN	1959–1970
Ross	NE	1970–1987
Beam	NE	1987–2001
Riley	NE	2001–2017
Grasz	NE	2018–present

Seat 6
Established on March 3, 1925, by 43 Stat. 1116
Van Valkenburgh	MO	1925–1933
Woodrough	NE	1933–1961
Mehaffy	AR	1963–1974
Henley	AR	1975–1982
Bowman II	MO	1983–2003
Gruender	MO	2004–present

Seat 7
Established on February 28, 1929, by 45 Stat. 1346
Gardner	SD	1929–1960
Ridge	MO	1961–1965
F. Gibson	MO	1965–1979
J. Gibson	MO	1982–1994
Murphy	MN	1994–2016
Stras	MN	2018–present

Seat 8
Established on May 24, 1940, by 54 Stat. 219
Johnsen	NE	1940–1965
Lay	MN	1966–1992
M. Arnold	AR	1992–2006
Shepherd	AR	2006–present

Seat 9
Established on May 24, 1940, by 54 Stat. 219
Riddick	AR	1941–1953
Vogel	ND	1954–1968
Bright	ND	1968–1985
Magill	ND	1986–1997
J.D. Kelly	ND	1998
Bye	ND	2000–2015
Erickson	ND	2017–2026
Traynor	ND	2026–present

Seat 10
Established on March 18, 1966, by 80 Stat. 75
Heaney	MN	1966–1988
Loken	MN	1990–present

Seat 11
Established on October 20, 1978, by 92 Stat. 1629
R. Arnold	AR	1980–2001
L. Smith	AR	2002–present

Seat 12
Established on July 10, 1984, by 98 Stat. 333
Wollman	SD	1985–2018
Kobes	SD	2018–present

Seat 13
Established on December 1, 1990, by 104 Stat. 5089
Hansen	IA	1991–2003
Colloton	IA	2003–present

== See also ==
- Judicial appointment history for United States federal courts#Eighth Circuit
- List of current United States circuit judges
