= Frank J. Magill =

American judge (1927–2013)

Frank Magill

Senior Judge of the United States Court of Appeals for the Eighth Circuit
- In office April 1, 1997 – June 2, 2013

Judge of the United States Court of Appeals for the Eighth Circuit
- In office March 4, 1986 – April 1, 1997
- Appointed by: Ronald Reagan
- Preceded by: Myron H. Bright
- Succeeded by: John David Kelly

Personal details
- Born: Frank John Magill; June 3, 1927 Verona, North Dakota, U.S.
- Died: June 2, 2013 (aged 85) Fargo, North Dakota, U.S.
- Children: Liz; Francis John Jr.
- Education: Georgetown University (BS, LLB); Columbia University (MA)

Frank John Magill (June 3, 1927 – June 2, 2013) was a United States circuit judge of the United States Court of Appeals for the Eighth Circuit.

== Early life and career ==
Born in Verona, North Dakota on June 3, 1927, Magill served in the United States Navy as a seaman from 1945 to 1947.

Magill received a Bachelor of Science in Foreign Service from Georgetown University in 1951, a Master of Arts from Columbia University in 1953, and a Bachelor of Laws from Georgetown University in 1955.

After graduation, he worked in private law practice in Fargo, North Dakota until 1986.

== Federal judicial service ==
Following the recommendation of Senator Mark Andrews, on January 21, 1986, Magill was nominated by President Ronald Reagan to a seat on the United States Court of Appeals for the Eighth Circuit vacated by Judge Myron H. Bright. Magill was confirmed by the United States Senate on March 3, 1986, and received his commission on March 4, 1986. He took the oath and commenced service on April 1, 1986. Magill wrote several opinions in the noted case of Black Hills Institute of Geological Research v. U.S. Dept. of Justice, which dealt with the ownership of the fossil of a Tyrannosaurus rex named Sue.

Over the course of his service, Magill also sat by designation on a total of six cases heard in three other circuits - the Third, Fifth, and Ninth. Among the cases that Magill heard while sitting on the Ninth Circuit was Silveira v. Lockyer, in which the court, with Magill concurring, ruled that the Second Amendment to the United States Constitution did not guarantee individuals the right to bear arms.

Magill assumed senior status on April 1, 1997, serving in that status until his death.

== Family ==
Magill's daughter, Liz Magill served as the ninth president of the University of Pennsylvania from 2022 to 2023. Previously, she was the dean of Stanford Law School, and the provost of the University of Virginia. Magill's son, Francis J. Magill, Jr., is a Minnesota District Court Judge.

== Death ==
Magill died on June 2, 2013, in Fargo.

== Sources ==
Legal offices
Preceded by Myron H. Bright	Judge of the United States Court of Appeals for the Eighth Circuit; 1986–1997	Succeeded by John David Kelly
