= J. Smith Henley =

American judge (1917–1997)

Jesse Smith Henley

Senior Judge of the United States Court of Appeals for the Eighth Circuit
- In office May 31, 1982 – October 18, 1997

Judge of the United States Court of Appeals for the Eighth Circuit
- In office March 14, 1975 – May 31, 1982
- Appointed by: Gerald Ford
- Preceded by: Pat Mehaffy
- Succeeded by: Pasco Bowman II

Chief Judge of the United States District Court for the Eastern District of Arkansas
- In office 1959–1975
- Preceded by: Thomas Clark Trimble III
- Succeeded by: Garnett Thomas Eisele

Judge of the United States District Court for the Eastern District of Arkansas Judge of the United States District Court for the Western District of Arkansas
- In office September 8, 1959 – March 24, 1975
- Appointed by: Dwight D. Eisenhower
- Preceded by: Harry Jacob Lemley
- Succeeded by: Terry Shell

Judge of the United States District Court for the Eastern District of Arkansas
- In office October 25, 1958 – September 8, 1959
- Appointed by: Dwight D. Eisenhower
- Preceded by: Thomas Clark Trimble III
- Succeeded by: Gordon Elmo Young

Personal details
- Born: Jesse Smith Henley; May 18, 1917 Saint Joe, Arkansas, U.S.
- Died: October 18, 1997 (aged 80) Harrison, Arkansas, U.S.
- Resting place: Henley Cemetery; Saint Joe, Arkansas
- Party: Republican
- Education: University of Arkansas School of Law (LLB)

Jesse Smith Henley (May 18, 1917 – October 18, 1997) was a United States circuit judge of the United States Court of Appeals for the Eighth Circuit and previously was a United States district judge of the United States District Court for the Eastern District of Arkansas and the United States District Court for the Western District of Arkansas.

== Education and career ==
Henley was born in Saint Joe in Searcy County in northern Arkansas to Benjamin Harrison Henley and the former Jessie Genoa Willis Smith. In 1941, Henley received a Bachelor of Laws from the University of Arkansas School of Law in Fayetteville. He was in private practice in Fayetteville from 1941 to 1954. From 1943 to 1945, he was a clerk and a Referee in Bankruptcy for the United States District Court for the Western District of Arkansas. In 1954, he became an associate general counsel in the Federal Communications Commission. In 1956, he was named a director in the Office of Administrative Procedure of the United States Department of Justice.

== Federal judicial service ==
With the retirement of Judge Thomas Clark Trimble III, the Arkansas Republican Party State Committee recommended Osro Cobb, the United States Attorney for the Eastern District of Arkansas as Trimble's successor. Trimble had sworn in Cobb as United States Attorney in 1954. A former Republican member of the Arkansas House of Representatives, Cobb carried the support of Democratic United States Senators John Little McClellan and J. William Fulbright. Attorney General of the United States Herbert Brownell Jr., had also promised to support Cobb for the judicial opening. The Little Rock Integration Crisis, however, ensued, and Cobb continued as United States Attorney during the desegregation of Central High School in Little Rock. Brownell, meanwhile, resigned and was replaced by William P. Rogers. Cobb later said that his oil investments began to multiply and paid far more than he would have earned as a federal judge had he gotten the appointment that he sought.

Henley received a recess appointment from President Dwight D. Eisenhower on October 25, 1958, to a seat on the United States District Court for the Eastern District of Arkansas vacated by Judge Thomas Clark Trimble III. He was nominated to the same seat on January 17, 1959. His service was terminated on September 8, 1959, due to appointment to a different judicial seat, never having been confirmed by the United States Senate for Judge Trimble's seat. His service would have otherwise terminated on September 11, 1959, due to the pending adjournment of the Senate.

Henley was nominated by President Eisenhower on August 18, 1959, to a joint seat on the United States District Court for the Eastern District of Arkansas and the United States District Court for the Western District of Arkansas vacated by Judge Harry Jacob Lemley. He was confirmed by the Senate on September 2, 1959, and received his commission on September 8, 1959. He served as Chief Judge of the Eastern District from 1959 to 1975. His service was terminated on March 24, 1975, due to his elevation to the Eighth Circuit.

Henley was nominated by President Gerald Ford on January 28, 1975, to a seat on the United States Court of Appeals for the Eighth Circuit vacated by Judge Pat Mehaffy. He was confirmed by the Senate on March 13, 1975, and received his commission on March 14, 1975. He assumed senior status on May 31, 1982. His service was terminated on October 18, 1997, due to his death in Harrison, Arkansas.

== Honor ==
The J. Smith Henley Federal Building in Harrison is named in Henley's honor. On April 28, 1999, Representative Asa Hutchinson introduced H.R.1605 - To designate the Federal building and United States courthouse located at 402 North Walnut Street in Harrison, Arkansas, as the `J. Smith Henley Federal Building and United States Courthouse'.

== Sources ==
Legal offices
Preceded by Thomas Clark Trimble III	Judge of the United States District Court for the Eastern District of Arkansas; 1958–1959	Succeeded by Gordon Elmo Young
Preceded by Harry Jacob Lemley	Judge of the United States District Court for the Eastern District of Arkansas; Judge of the United States District Court for the Western District of Arkansas; 1959–1975	Succeeded by Terry Shell
Preceded by Thomas Clark Trimble III	Chief Judge of the United States District Court for the Eastern District of Arkansas; 1959–1975	Succeeded by Garnett Thomas Eisele
Preceded by Pat Mehaffy	Judge of the United States Court of Appeals for the Eighth Circuit; 1975–1982	Succeeded by Pasco Bowman II
