= Merrill E. Otis =

American judge (1884–1944)

Judge of the United States District Court for the Western District of Missouri
- In office March 23, 1925 – December 23, 1944
- Appointed by: Calvin Coolidge
- Preceded by: Arba Seymour Van Valkenburgh
- Succeeded by: Albert Alphonso Ridge

Personal details
- Born: Merrill E. Otis; July 7, 1884 Hopkins, Missouri, U.S.
- Died: December 23, 1944 (aged 60)
- Education: University of Missouri (A.B., A.M.); University of Missouri School of Law (LL.B.)

Merrill E. Otis (July 7, 1884 – December 23, 1944) was a United States district judge of the United States District Court for the Western District of Missouri.

== Education and career ==
He was born in Xenia, Missouri near Hopkins, Nodaway County, Missouri, He graduated in 1902 from Maryville High School.

Otis received an Artium Baccalaureus degree from the University of Missouri in 1906, an Artium Magister degree from the same institution in 1910, and a Bachelor of Laws from the University of Missouri School of Law in 1910. He was in private practice in St. Joseph, Missouri from 1911 to 1921. He was an unsuccessful candidate for the United States House of Representatives in 1914. He was a first assistant city counselor for St. Joseph from 1915 to 1916, and first assistant prosecuting attorney of that city from 1917 to 1918. He was a first assistant state attorney general of Missouri from 1921 to 1923. He was Chairman of the Missouri Public Service Commission from 1923 to 1924. He was then an assistant to the United States Solicitor General from 1924 to 1925.

== Federal judicial service ==
Otis received a recess appointment from President Calvin Coolidge on March 23, 1925, to a seat on the United States District Court for the Western District of Missouri vacated by Judge Arba Seymour Van Valkenburgh. He was nominated to the same position by President Coolidge on December 8, 1925. He was confirmed by the United States Senate on December 14, 1925, and received his commission the same day. His service terminated on December 23, 1944, due to his death.

=== Notable case ===
Among his notable cases was the judge in the trial of Kansas City boss Tom Pendergast in 1939 that led to Pendergast's fall and the dismantling of the Pendergast machine that dominated Kansas City and Missouri politics and launched the career of Harry S. Truman.

== Sources ==
Legal offices
| Preceded by Arba Seymour Van Valkenburgh | Judge of the United States District Court for the Western District of Missouri; 1925–1944 | Succeeded by Albert Alphonso Ridge |
