= Floyd Robert Gibson =

American judge (1910–2001)

Senior Judge of the United States Court of Appeals for the Eighth Circuit
- In office December 31, 1979 – October 4, 2001

Chief Judge of the United States Court of Appeals for the Eighth Circuit
- In office 1974–1979
- Preceded by: Pat Mehaffy
- Succeeded by: Donald P. Lay

Judge of the United States Court of Appeals for the Eighth Circuit
- In office June 8, 1965 – December 31, 1979
- Appointed by: Lyndon B. Johnson
- Preceded by: Albert Alphonso Ridge
- Succeeded by: John R. Gibson

Chief Judge of the United States District Court for the Western District of Missouri
- In office 1962–1965
- Preceded by: Randle Jasper Smith
- Succeeded by: William H. Becker

Judge of the United States District Court for the Western District of Missouri
- In office August 30, 1961 – June 20, 1965
- Appointed by: John F. Kennedy
- Preceded by: Seat established by 75 Stat. 80
- Succeeded by: Elmo Bolton Hunter

Personal details
- Born: Floyd Robert Gibson; March 3, 1910 Prescott, Arizona Territory
- Died: October 4, 2001 (aged 91) Kansas City, Missouri, U.S.
- Education: University of Missouri (AB); University of Missouri School of Law (LLB)

Floyd Robert Gibson (March 3, 1910 – October 4, 2001) was a United States circuit judge of the United States Court of Appeals for the Eighth Circuit and was previously a United States district judge of the United States District Court for the Western District of Missouri.

== Education and career ==
Born in Prescott, Arizona Territory Gibson received an Artium Baccalaureus degree from the University of Missouri in 1931 and a Bachelor of Laws from the University of Missouri School of Law in 1933. He was in private practice in Independence, Missouri from 1933 to 1937, and in Kansas City, Missouri from 1937 to 1961. He was a member of the Missouri House of Representatives from 1940 to 1946, and of the Missouri Senate from 1946 to 1961, serving as President pro tem from 1957 to 1961. He was also a counselor to Jackson County, Missouri from 1942 to 1944.

== Federal judicial service ==
Gibson was nominated by President John F. Kennedy on August 17, 1961, to the United States District Court for the Western District of Missouri, to a new seat authorized by 75 Stat. 80. He was confirmed by the United States Senate on August 30, 1961, and received his commission on August 30, 1961. He served as Chief Judge from 1962 to 1965. His service terminated on June 20, 1965, due to elevation to the Eighth Circuit.

Gibson was nominated by President Lyndon B. Johnson on May 18, 1965, to a seat on the United States Court of Appeals for the Eighth Circuit vacated by Judge Albert Alphonso Ridge. He was confirmed by the Senate on June 8, 1965, and received his commission on June 8, 1965. He served as Chief Judge from 1974 to 1979. He assumed senior status on December 31, 1979. His service terminated on October 4, 2001, due to his death in Kansas City, Missouri.

== Sources ==
Legal offices
Preceded by Seat established by 75 Stat. 80	Judge of the United States District Court for the Western District of Missouri; 1961–1965	Succeeded by Elmo Bolton Hunter
Preceded by Randle Jasper Smith	Chief Judge of the United States District Court for the Western District of Missouri; 1962–1965	Succeeded by William H. Becker
Preceded by Albert Alphonso Ridge	Judge of the United States Court of Appeals for the Eighth Circuit; 1965–1979	Succeeded by John R. Gibson
Preceded by Pat Mehaffy	Chief Judge of the United States Court of Appeals for the Eighth Circuit; 1974–1979	Succeeded by Donald P. Lay
