= Charles Evans Whittaker =

US Supreme Court justice from 1957 to 1962

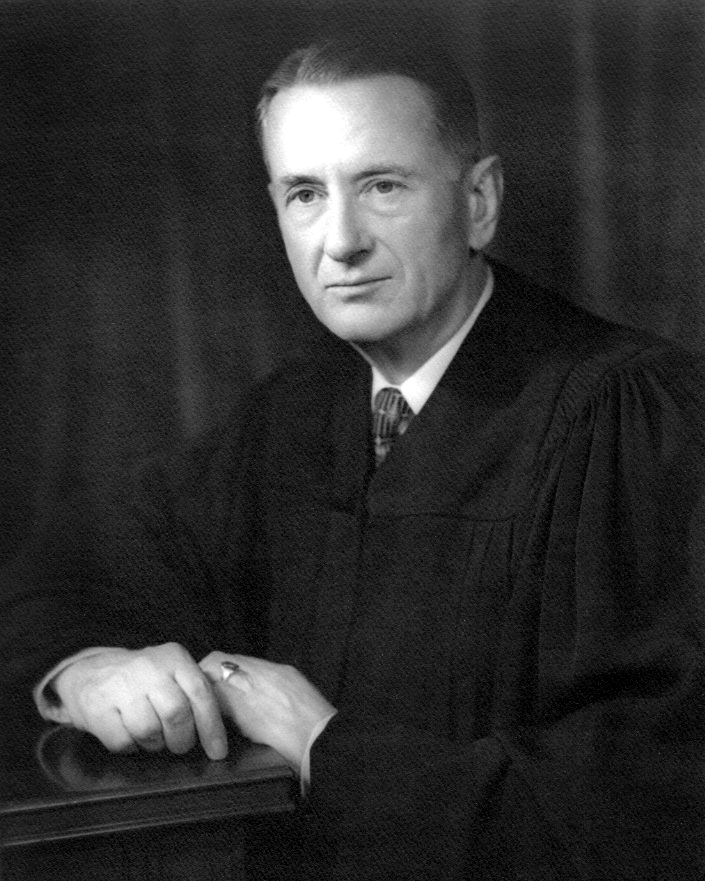
- Whittaker, c. 1956

Associate Justice of the Supreme Court of the United States
- In office March 25, 1957 – March 31, 1962
- Nominated by: Dwight D. Eisenhower
- Preceded by: Stanley Forman Reed
- Succeeded by: Byron White

Judge of the United States Court of Appeals for the Eighth Circuit
- In office June 5, 1956 – March 24, 1957
- Nominated by: Dwight D. Eisenhower
- Preceded by: John Caskie Collet
- Succeeded by: Marion Charles Matthes

Judge of the United States District Court for the Western District of Missouri
- In office July 8, 1954 – June 21, 1956
- Nominated by: Dwight D. Eisenhower
- Preceded by: Albert L. Reeves
- Succeeded by: Randle Jasper Smith

Personal details
- Born: Charles Evans Whittaker; February 22, 1901 Troy, Kansas, U.S.
- Died: November 26, 1973 (aged 72) Kansas City, Missouri, U.S.
- Party: Republican
- Spouse: Winifred Pugh (m. 1928)
- Children: 3
- Education: Kansas City School of Law (LLB)

Charles Evans Whittaker (February 22, 1901 – November 26, 1973) was an associate justice of the United States Supreme Court from 1957 to 1962. After working in private practice in Kansas City, Missouri, he was nominated for the United States District Court for the Western District of Missouri. In 1956, President Dwight D. Eisenhower nominated Whittaker to the United States Court of Appeals for the Eighth Circuit. In 1957, he won confirmation to the Supreme Court of the United States, thus becoming the first individual to serve as a judge on a federal district court, a federal court of appeals, and the United States Supreme Court. During his brief tenure on the Warren Court, Whittaker emerged as a swing vote. In 1962, he had a nervous breakdown and resigned from the court. After leaving the Supreme Court, he served as chief counsel to General Motors and frequently criticized the Civil Rights Movement and the Warren Court.

== Early years and career ==
Whittaker was born on a farm near Troy, Kansas to Charles Edward Whittaker, a farmer, and Ida Eve Miller, a schoolteacher from Hagerstown, Maryland. He attended the nearby one-room Brush Creek School, and then the Troy High School until he dropped out in the ninth grade after his mother died on his sixteenth birthday. He spent the next three years working on a family farm, and also hunting and trapping. Whittaker developed an interest in law by reading newspaper articles about criminal trials. In the summer of 1920, he applied to the part-time evening program at the Kansas City School of Law (currently the University of Missouri–Kansas City School of Law) and gained admission with the condition that he would finish his high school education after personally pleading with Oliver Dean, the president of the law school. He immediately enrolled at Manual High School in Kansas City, Missouri and spent the next four years working during the day to support himself, while taking high school and law school courses in the evenings. Whittaker's law school classmates included future President Harry S. Truman. Whittaker graduated in the class of 1924 with a Bachelor of Laws having been admitted to the Missouri bar during his senior year. Whittaker joined the law firm of Watson, Ess, Marshall & Enggas in Kansas City, Missouri, where he previously worked full-time as an office boy, and built up a practice in corporate law with the Union Pacific Railroad, Montgomery Ward, and the City National Bank and Trust Company among his clients. He was a member of Tau Kappa Epsilon fraternity and developed close ties to the Republican Party.

== Federal judicial service (District Court and Court of Appeals) ==
Whittaker was nominated by President Dwight D. Eisenhower on May 11, 1954, to a seat on the United States District Court for the Western District of Missouri vacated by Judge Albert L. Reeves. He was confirmed by the United States Senate on July 7, 1954, and received his commission the next day. His service terminated on June 21, 1956, due to his elevation to the Eighth Circuit.

Whittaker was nominated by President Eisenhower on March 16, 1956, to a seat on the United States Court of Appeals for the Eighth Circuit vacated by Judge John Caskie Collet. He was confirmed by the Senate on June 4, 1956, and received his commission the next day. His service terminated on March 24, 1957, due to his elevation to the Supreme Court of the United States.

== Supreme Court ==
Whittaker was nominated by President Eisenhower on March 2, 1957, as an associate justice of the Supreme Court, to succeed Stanley Forman Reed. He was confirmed by the Senate on March 19, 1957, by a unanimous vote. Whittaker took the judicial oath of office on March 25, 1957. He thus became the first person to serve as a judge of a United States District Court, a United States Court of Appeals, and the Supreme Court of the United States. Samuel Blatchford also served at all three levels of the federal judiciary, but the court system was configured slightly differently at that time. Whittaker served as Circuit Justice of the Eighth Circuit and the Tenth Circuit for his duration of service on the Supreme Court.

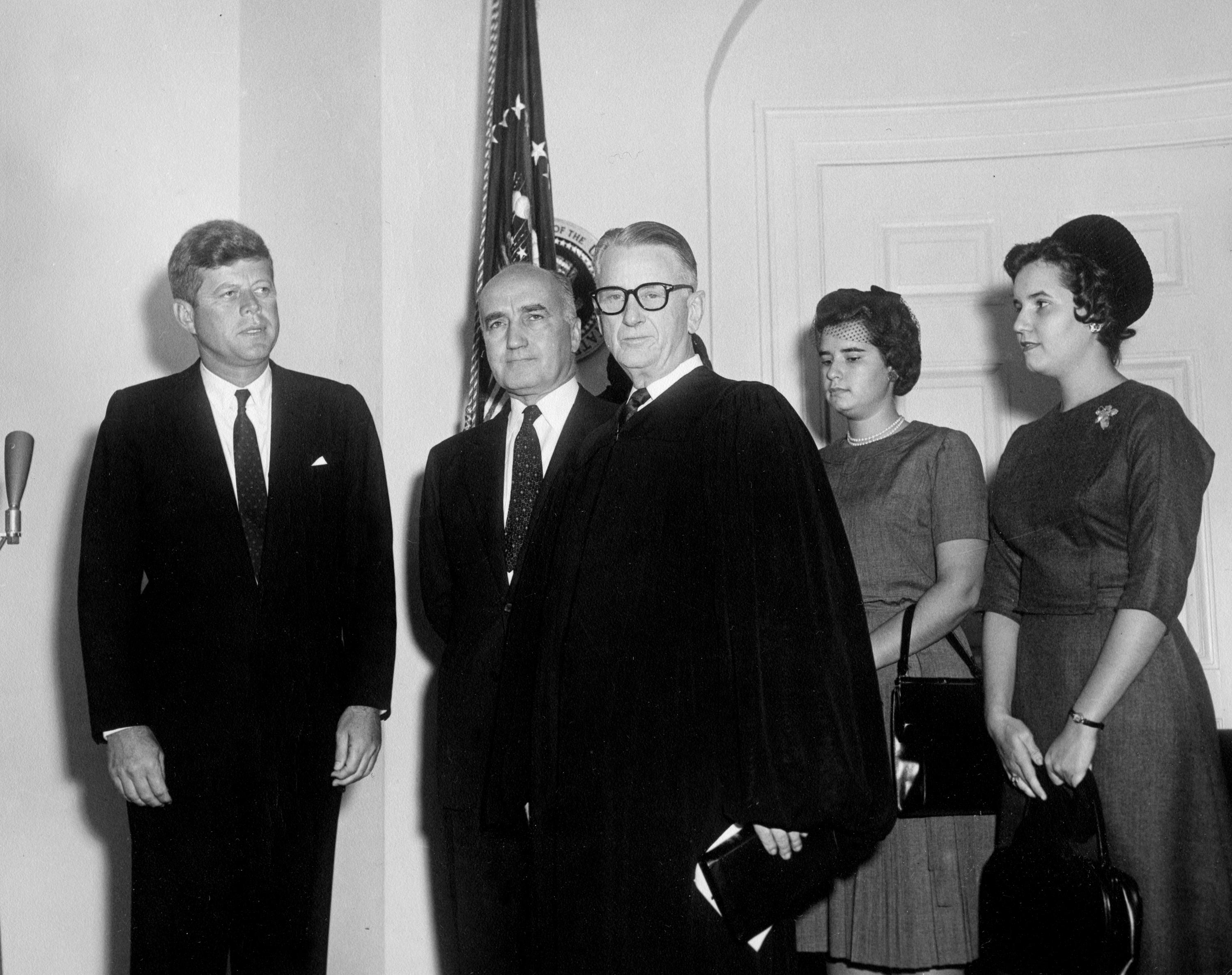
Whittaker (center), in 1961

On the closely divided Supreme Court, Whittaker was a swing vote. According to Professor Howard Ball, Whittaker was an "extremely weak, vacillating justice" who was "courted by the two cliques on the Court because his vote was generally up in the air and typically went to the group that made the last, but not necessarily the best, argument." Whittaker failed to develop a consistent judicial philosophy and reportedly felt himself not as qualified as some of the other members of the Court. After agonizing deeply for months over his vote in Baker v. Carr, a landmark reapportionment case, Whittaker suffered a nervous breakdown in the spring of 1962. At the behest of Chief Justice Earl Warren, Whittaker recused himself from the case and retired from the Court effective March 31, 1962 due to a certified disability, citing exhaustion from the heavy workload and stress.

As of 2026, Whittaker remains the only Supreme Court Justice appointed from Missouri. He is also the most recently appointed Justice to have received his legal education from a public law school.

== Final years ==
Effective September 30, 1965, Whittaker became chief legal counsel to General Motors. He also became a resolute critic of the Warren Court as well as the Civil Rights Movement, characterizing the civil disobedience of the type practiced by Martin Luther King Jr. and his followers as lawless. He wrote a piece for the FBI Law Enforcement Bulletin that advised protesters to use courts instead of taking to the streets. Whittaker died on November 26, 1973, at St. Luke's Hospital in Kansas City, Missouri of a ruptured abdominal aneurysm.

== Family ==
In 1928, Whittaker married Winifred R. Pugh. They had three sons: Dr. Charles Keith Whittaker, a neurosurgeon; Kent E. Whittaker, an attorney; and Gary T. Whittaker, a stockbroker.

== Legacy and honors ==
The federal courthouse in downtown Kansas City, Missouri, which houses the United States District Court for the Western District of Missouri, is named in memory of Whittaker.

== See also ==
- List of justices of the Supreme Court of the United States
- List of law clerks for the sixth seat of the Supreme Court of the United States
- List of United States Supreme Court justices by time in office
- United States Supreme Court cases during the Warren Court

Legal offices
Preceded by Albert L. Reeves	Judge of the United States District Court for the Western District of Missouri; 1954–1956	Succeeded by Randle Jasper Smith
Preceded by John Caskie Collet	Judge of the United States Court of Appeals for the Eighth Circuit; 1956–1957	Succeeded by Marion Charles Matthes
Preceded by Stanley Forman Reed	Associate Justice of the Supreme Court of the United States; 1957–1962	Succeeded by Byron White
