= Thomas Westcott =

American judge (1758–1838)

Thomas Westcott (July 16, 1758 – September 22, 1838) was Rhode Island sheriff and militiaman who served as a justice of the Rhode Island Supreme Court from May 1810 to May 1811.

Westcott was high sheriff of Kent County, Rhode Island, and a Brigadier General of the militia. He served as an associate justice of the Supreme Court for one year, from May 1810 to May 1811. He died in Warwick, Rhode Island.

Political offices
| Preceded by Benjamin Johnson | Justice of the Rhode Island Supreme Court; 1810–1811 | Succeeded by Benjamin Johnson |
