= Kermit Edward Bye =

American judge (1937–2021)

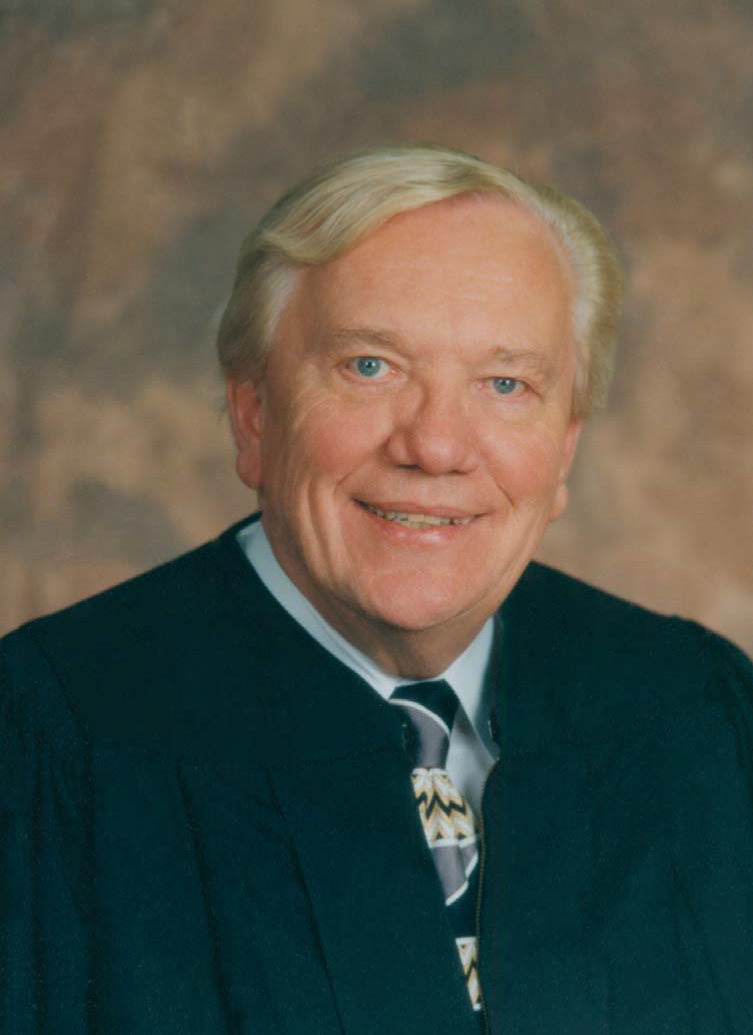

Senior Judge of the United States Court of Appeals for the Eighth Circuit
- In office April 22, 2015 – September 1, 2016

Judge of the United States Court of Appeals for the Eighth Circuit
- In office March 9, 2000 – April 22, 2015
- Appointed by: Bill Clinton
- Preceded by: John David Kelly
- Succeeded by: Ralph R. Erickson

Personal details
- Born: Kermit Edward Bye; January 13, 1937 Hatton, North Dakota
- Died: March 20, 2021 (aged 84)
- Education: University of North Dakota (BS); University of North Dakota School of Law (JD)

Kermit Edward Bye (January 13, 1937 – March 20, 2021) was a United States circuit judge of the United States Court of Appeals for the Eighth Circuit.

== Early life and education ==
Born in Hatton, North Dakota, Bye earned a Bachelor of Science degree from the University of North Dakota in 1959 and a Juris Doctor in 1962 from the University of North Dakota School of Law.

== Professional career ==
After completing law school, Bye worked as deputy state securities commissioner in North Dakota from 1962 until 1964 and as a special assistant attorney general in North Dakota from 1964 until 1966. He then was an Assistant United States Attorney for the District of North Dakota from 1966 until 1968. Bye joined the Vogel law firm in Fargo, North Dakota, in 1968, and practiced at that firm until his judicial confirmation in 2000.

== Federal judicial service ==
President Bill Clinton nominated Bye to the United States Court of Appeals for the Eighth Circuit on April 22, 1999, to fill a vacancy created by the 1998 death of Judge John David Kelly, who was Bye's friend and former law partner. "I'm very pleased in the trust the president has placed in me and I'm honored to be able to follow my friend and 30-year law partner into this position," Bye told the Associated Press on the day of his nomination. "But it's unfortunate that this opportunity for me arose from his death." Bye's nomination was unanimously approved by the United States Senate's Judiciary Committee on November 17, 1999, but languished because of an impasse between Clinton and Senate Republicans over the president's use of recess appointments. Ultimately, the Senate confirmed Bye to the seat on the Eighth Circuit in a 98-0 vote on February 24, 2000, and he received his commission on March 9, 2000. "The process involved...can be complex at best, certainly at times confusing and at times even frustrating," Bye told his supporters at his June 1, 2000, swearing-in. But "when it all works out, then it doesn't seem so bad after all." Bye assumed senior status on April 22, 2015. He retired from active service on September 1, 2016.

== Cases ==
- United States v. Neil Scott Kramer

Legal offices
Preceded by John David Kelly	Judge of the United States Court of Appeals for the Eighth Circuit; 2000–2015	Succeeded by Ralph R. Erickson
