= Anthony Te Paske =

American politician and businessman

Anthony Te Paske (October 1868 – February 11, 1946) was an American politician and businessman.

Born in Greenleafton, Minnesota, Te Peske moved to Iowa as a child. He later graduated from Grinnell College and Harvard College with a BA from both. He served in the Iowa House of Representatives from 1931 to 1933 and 1943 to 1946 as a Republican, serving the 81st district. He died in Sioux Center, Iowa.
