= Walter M. Bastian =

American judge

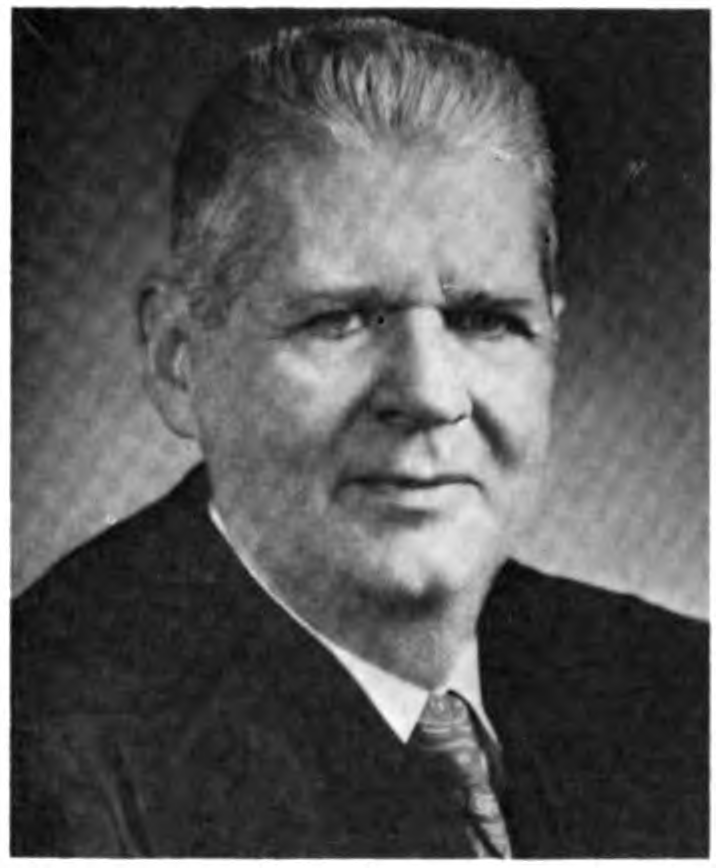

Senior Judge of the United States Court of Appeals for the District of Columbia Circuit
- In office March 16, 1965 – March 12, 1975

Judge of the United States Court of Appeals for the District of Columbia Circuit
- In office September 20, 1954 – March 16, 1965
- Appointed by: Dwight D. Eisenhower
- Preceded by: Bennett Champ Clark
- Succeeded by: Edward Allen Tamm

Judge of the United States District Court for the District of Columbia
- In office October 23, 1950 – December 15, 1954
- Appointed by: Harry S. Truman
- Preceded by: Jennings Bailey
- Succeeded by: Joseph Charles McGarraghy

Personal details
- Born: November 16, 1891 Washington, D.C., U.S.
- Died: March 12, 1975 (aged 83)
- Education: Georgetown Law (LLB)

Walter Maximillian Bastian (November 16, 1891 – March 12, 1975) was a United States circuit judge of the United States Court of Appeals for the District of Columbia Circuit and previously was a United States district judge of the United States District Court for the District of Columbia.

== Education and career ==
Born in Washington, D.C., Bastian received a Bachelor of Laws from Georgetown Law in 1913. He served as a first lieutenant in chemical warfare service of the United States Army during World War I. He was in private practice in Washington, D.C., from 1915 to 1950. He was a lecturer at the National University School of Law from 1918 to 1948.

== Federal judicial service ==
Bastian received a recess appointment from President Harry S. Truman on October 23, 1950, to a seat on the United States District Court for the District of Columbia vacated by Judge Jennings Bailey. He was nominated to the same position by President Truman on November 27, 1950. He was confirmed by the United States Senate on December 14, 1950, and received his commission on December 22, 1950. His service terminated on December 15, 1954, due to his elevation to the District of Columbia Circuit.

Bastian received a recess appointment from President Dwight D. Eisenhower on September 20, 1954, to a seat on the United States Court of Appeals for the District of Columbia Circuit vacated by Judge Bennett Champ Clark. He was nominated to the same position by President Eisenhower on November 8, 1954. He was confirmed by the Senate on December 2, 1954, and received his commission the next day. He assumed senior status on March 16, 1965. His service terminated on March 12, 1975, due to his death.

== Other service ==
Bastian served as president of the board of directors of the National Conference on Citizenship in 1960.

== Sources ==
Legal offices
Preceded by Jennings Bailey	Judge of the United States District Court for the District of Columbia; 1950–1954	Succeeded by Joseph Charles McGarraghy
Preceded by Bennett Champ Clark	Judge of the United States Court of Appeals for the District of Columbia Circuit; 1954–1965	Succeeded by Edward Allen Tamm
