= Justice Johnston =

Justice Johston may refer to:

- Alexander Johnston (1775–1849), British colonial official who served as third Chief Justice of Ceylon
- Francis Wayland Johnston (1882–1960), associate justice of the New Hampshire Supreme Court
- William Agnew Johnston (1848–1937), associate justice of the Kansas Supreme Court

== See also ==
- Douglas I. Johnstone (born 1941), justice of the Supreme Court of Alabama
- Martin E. Johnstone (born 1949), associate justice of the Kentucky Supreme Court
- Justice Johnson (disambiguation)
