= Seth Thomas (judge) =

American judge (1873–1962)

Senior Judge of the United States Court of Appeals for the Eighth Circuit
- In office May 1, 1954 – February 2, 1962

Judge of the United States Court of Appeals for the Eighth Circuit
- In office December 2, 1935 – May 1, 1954
- Appointed by: Franklin D. Roosevelt
- Preceded by: Charles Breckenridge Faris
- Succeeded by: Martin Donald Van Oosterhout

Personal details
- Born: Seth Thomas; May 18, 1873 McConnelsville, Ohio, U.S.
- Died: February 2, 1962 (aged 88) Sioux City, Iowa, U.S.
- Education: University of Iowa (PhB, AM); University of Iowa College of Law (LLB)

Seth Thomas (May 18, 1873 – February 2, 1962) was a United States circuit judge of the United States Court of Appeals for the Eighth Circuit.

== Education and career ==
Born in McConnelsville, Ohio, Thomas did not get a college degree until he was 31, receiving a Bachelor of Philosophy from the University of Iowa in 1904. He remained at the University of Iowa for his graduate work, receiving an Artium Magister degree in 1906 and a Bachelor of Laws from the University of Iowa College of Law in 1910. Upon receiving his law degree, he started a private practice of law in Fort Dodge, Iowa. Thomas suspended his private practice to become an Assistant United States Attorney for the Northern District of Iowa in 1914. After about six years of service, he returned to his private practice in 1920. He didn't return to public service until the Democratic Party again controlled the White House in 1933, when he became Solicitor for the United States Department of Agriculture.

== Federal judicial service ==
Thomas received a recess appointment from President Franklin D. Roosevelt on December 2, 1935, to a seat on the United States Court of Appeals for the Eighth Circuit vacated by Judge Charles Breckenridge Faris. He nominated to the same position by President Roosevelt on January 6, 1936. He was confirmed by the United States Senate on January 22, 1936, and received his commission on January 28, 1936. He assumed senior status on May 1, 1954. His service terminated on February 2, 1962, due to his death in Sioux City, Iowa.

== Sources ==
Legal offices
Preceded by Charles Breckenridge Faris	Judge of the United States Court of Appeals for the Eighth Circuit; 1935–1954	Succeeded by Martin Donald Van Oosterhout
