= Barrington D. Parker =

American judge (1915–1993)

Barrington Daniels Parker

Senior Judge of the United States District Court for the District of Columbia
- In office December 19, 1985 – June 2, 1993

Judge of the United States District Court for the District of Columbia
- In office December 19, 1969 – December 19, 1985
- Appointed by: Richard Nixon
- Preceded by: Joseph Charles McGarraghy
- Succeeded by: Royce Lamberth

Personal details
- Born: Barrington Daniels Parker; November 17, 1915 Rosslyn, Virginia, U.S.
- Died: June 2, 1993 (aged 77) Silver Spring, Maryland, U.S.
- Children: Barrington D. Parker Jr.
- Education: Lincoln University (BA); University of Pennsylvania (MA); University of Chicago (JD)

Barrington Daniels Parker (November 17, 1915 – June 2, 1993) was a United States district judge of the United States District Court for the District of Columbia.

== Education and career ==
Parker was born in Rosslyn, Virginia, on November 17, 1915. His father was dean of the now-closed Terrell Law School in Washington, D.C. Barrington attended Dunbar High School in Washington, and graduated from Lincoln University in Pennsylvania in 1936 with an Artium Baccalaureus degree in economics, and from the University of Pennsylvania in 1938 with a Master of Arts, finally receiving a J.D. degree from the University of Chicago Law School in 1947.

== Federal judicial service ==
On September 15, 1969, Parker was nominated by President Richard Nixon to a seat on the United States District Court for the District of Columbia vacated by Judge Joseph Charles McGarraghy. Parker was confirmed by the United States Senate on December 18, 1969, and received his commission on December 19, 1969. Parker assumed senior status on December 19, 1985, and served in that capacity until his death. He died on June 2, 1993, at Holy Cross Hospital in Silver Spring, Maryland.

== Notable cases ==
Parker's most high-profile case was the criminal trial of John Hinckley Jr.

Parker also ordered the closure of the High Security Unit in Lexington, Kentucky, a women's prison wing used to house certain prisoners in isolation based on their political beliefs or affiliations. Parker said in his ruling that: '"The treatment of the plaintiffs has skirted elemental standards of human decency. The exaggerated security, small group isolation and staff harassment serve to constantly undermine the inmates' morale". He ordered the Bureau of Prisons to rewrite its regulations and transfer the handful of prisoners held there into the general prison population.

== Personal life ==
Parker's son, Barrington D. Parker Jr., is a senior judge of the United States Court of Appeals for the Second Circuit.

== See also ==
- List of African-American federal judges
- List of African-American jurists

== Sources ==
Legal offices
Preceded by Joseph Charles McGarraghy	Judge of the United States District Court for the District of Columbia; 1969–1985	Succeeded by Royce Lamberth
