= Benjamin Johnson (Rhode Island judge) =

American judge (1749–1814)

Benjamin Johnson (February 3, 1749 – May 1814) was a justice of the Rhode Island Supreme Court from May 1808 to May 1810, and again from May 1811 until his death in May 1814.

"Benjamin Johnson, son of Isaac and Audry, born Feb. 3, 1749, was one of the judges of the Court of Common Pleas and of the Supreme Court of Rhode Island for many years. He married Mary Weaver, born June 28, 1752".

Johnson and his wife had seven children, of whom three died in infancy. Johnson served on the state supreme court until his death.
