= Harvey M. Johnsen =

American judge (1895–1975)

Senior Judge of the United States Court of Appeals for the Eighth Circuit
- In office August 1, 1965 – September 15, 1975

Chief Judge of the United States Court of Appeals for the Eighth Circuit
- In office August 7, 1959 – July 17, 1965
- Preceded by: Archibald K. Gardner
- Succeeded by: Charles Joseph Vogel

Judge of the United States Court of Appeals for the Eighth Circuit
- In office October 14, 1940 – August 1, 1965
- Appointed by: Franklin D. Roosevelt
- Preceded by: Seat established by 54 Stat. 219
- Succeeded by: Donald P. Lay

Personal details
- Born: Harvey M. Johnsen; July 16, 1895 Hastings, Nebraska, U.S.
- Died: September 15, 1975 (aged 80)
- Education: University of Nebraska–Lincoln (AB); University of Nebraska College of Law (LLB)

Harvey M. Johnsen (July 16, 1895 – September 15, 1975) was a United States circuit judge of the United States Court of Appeals for the Eighth Circuit.

== Education and career ==
Born in Hastings, Nebraska, Johnsen received a Bachelor of Laws from the University of Nebraska College of Law in 1919 and an Artium Baccalaureus from the University of Nebraska–Lincoln in 1921. He was in private practice in Omaha, Nebraska from 1920 to 1931, and a faculty member at the Creighton University School of Law in Omaha from 1922 to 1926. He was general counsel to the Farm Credit Administration in Omaha from 1931 to 1933, returning to private practice there from 1934 to 1938. On Nov. 28, 1938, he was appointed by Governor Robert Leroy Cochran to be an associate justice of the Supreme Court of Nebraska. Johnsen's term began January 3, 1939, lasting until he resigned November 8, 1940.

== Education and career ==
Johnsen was nominated by President Franklin D. Roosevelt on October 1, 1940, to the United States Court of Appeals for the Eighth Circuit, to a new seat authorized by 54 Stat. 219. He was confirmed by the United States Senate on October 7, 1940, and received his commission on October 14, 1940. He served as Chief Judge and as a member of the Judicial Conference of the United States from August 7, 1959 to July 16, 1965. He assumed senior status on August 1, 1965. His service terminated on September 15, 1975, due to his death.

== Sources ==
Legal offices
Preceded by Seat established by 54 Stat. 219	Judge of the United States Court of Appeals for the Eighth Circuit; 1940–1965	Succeeded by Donald P. Lay
Preceded by Archibald K. Gardner	Chief Judge of the United States Court of Appeals for the Eighth Circuit; 1959–1965	Succeeded by Charles Joseph Vogel
