= List of United States federal courthouses in North Dakota =

Following is a list of current and former courthouses of the United States federal court system located in North Dakota. Each entry indicates the name of the building along with an image, if available, its location and the jurisdiction it covers, the dates during which it was used for each such jurisdiction, and, if applicable the person for whom it was named, and the date of renaming. Dates of use will not necessarily correspond with the dates of construction or demolition of a building, as pre-existing structures may be adapted or court use, and former court buildings may later be put to other uses. Also, the official name of the building may be changed at some point after its use as a federal court building has been initiated.

== Courthouses ==
Courthouse	City	Image	Street address	Jurisdiction	Dates of use	Named for
U.S. Post Office and Court House^{†}	Bismarck		304 E. Broadway Ave.	D.N.D.	1913–1964; Still in use as a federal office building.	n/a
William L. Guy Federal Building	Bismarck		220 East Rosser Avenue	D.N.D.	1964–present	Governor William L. Guy (1999)
U.S. Post Office and Court House^{†}	Devil's Lake		?	D.N.D.	1913–1948; Now the Lake Region Heritage Center.	n/a
U.S. Post Office and Court House	Fargo		?	D.N.D.	1897–c. 1931; Razed.	n/a
Quentin N. Burdick U.S. Courthouse	Fargo		655 First Avenue North	D.N.D.	1931–present Expanded in 1998	U.S. Senator Quentin N. Burdick
Ronald N. Davies Federal Bldg & U.S. Courthouse^{†}	Grand Forks		102 North Fourth Street	D.N.D.	1906–present	District Court judge Ronald N. Davies (2002)
U.S. Post Office and Court House	Jamestown		222 1st Avenue South	D.N.D.	1930–1948; Completed in 1929; now used as apartments.	n/a
Bruce M. Van Sickle Federal Building and U.S. Courthouse†	Minot		100 First Street SW	D.N.D.	1915–present	District Court judge Bruce Van Sickle (2002)

== Key ==
^{†}	Listed on the National Register of Historic Places (NRHP)
^{††}	NRHP-listed and also designated as a National Historic Landmark
