= List of federal judges appointed by Donald Trump =

This is a comprehensive list of all Article III and Article IV United States federal judges appointed by President Donald Trump, as well as a partial list of Article I federal judicial appointments, excluding appointments to the District of Columbia judiciary.

As of November 20, 2026, the United States Senate has confirmed 295 Article III judges nominated by Trump: three associate justices of the Supreme Court of the United States, 66 judges for the United States courts of appeals, 222 judges for the United States district courts, and four judges for the United States Court of International Trade. There are 19 nominations awaiting Senate action: Two for the courts of appeals, 17 for the district courts, and none for the Trade Court. There are no vacancies on the U.S. courts of appeals, 25 vacancies on the U.S. district courts, and no vacancies on the U.S. Court of International Trade, as well as 12 announced vacancies that may occur before the end of Trump's term (two for the courts of appeals and 10 for the district courts). (Note: This includes four court of appeals and seven district court vacancies without set dates for the vacancies. In practice, this generally means that the judge will assume senior status upon the confirmation of their successor.) Trump has not made any recess appointments to the federal courts.

In terms of Article I courts, Trump has made 43 appointments: 18 for the United States Court of Military Commission Review, 10 for the United States Court of Federal Claims, seven for the United States Tax Court, six for the United States Court of Appeals for Veterans Claims, and two for the United States Court of Appeals for the Armed Forces. There is one vacancy on the U.S. Tax Court and three on the Veteran Claims court. Trump designated Susan G. Braden, Margaret M. Sweeney, Eleni M. Roumel, and Matthew H. Solomson as chief judges of the Court of Federal Claims.

On the Article IV territorial courts, Trump has made two appointments. There is one vacancy on the U.S. territorial courts.

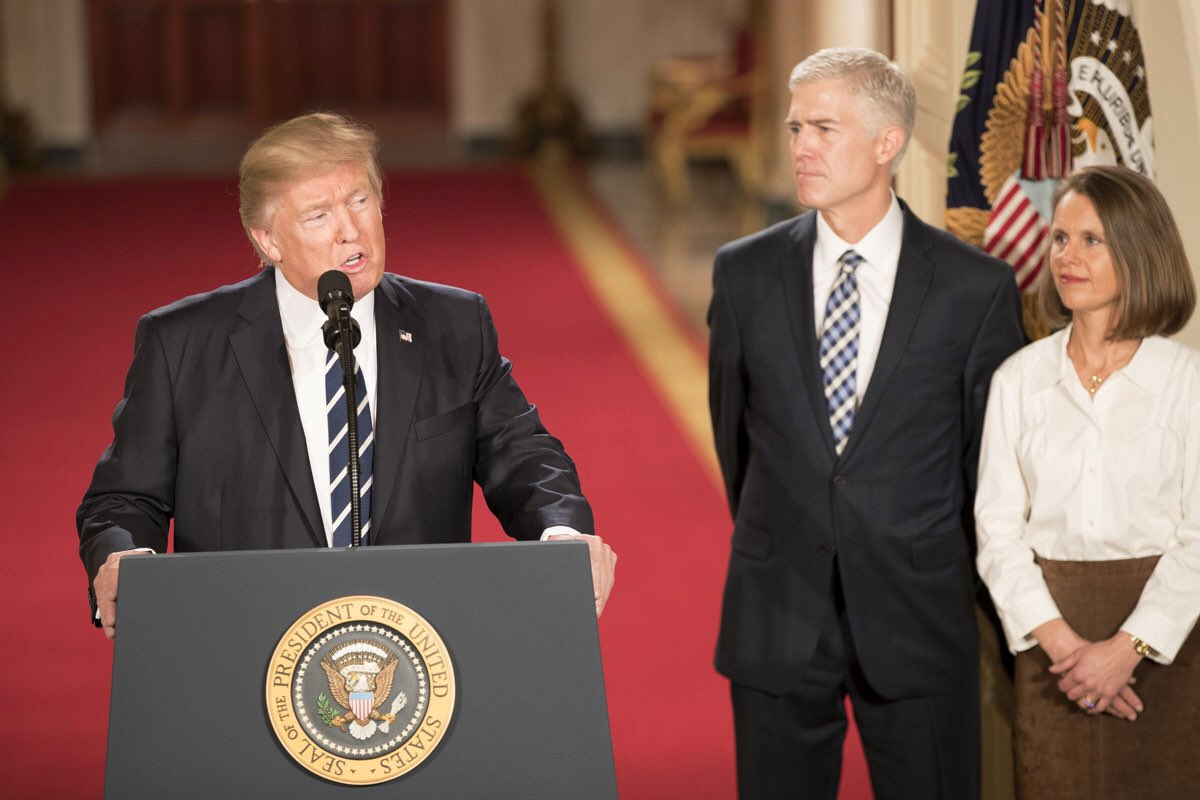
Trump with his first Supreme Court nominee,
Neil Gorsuch

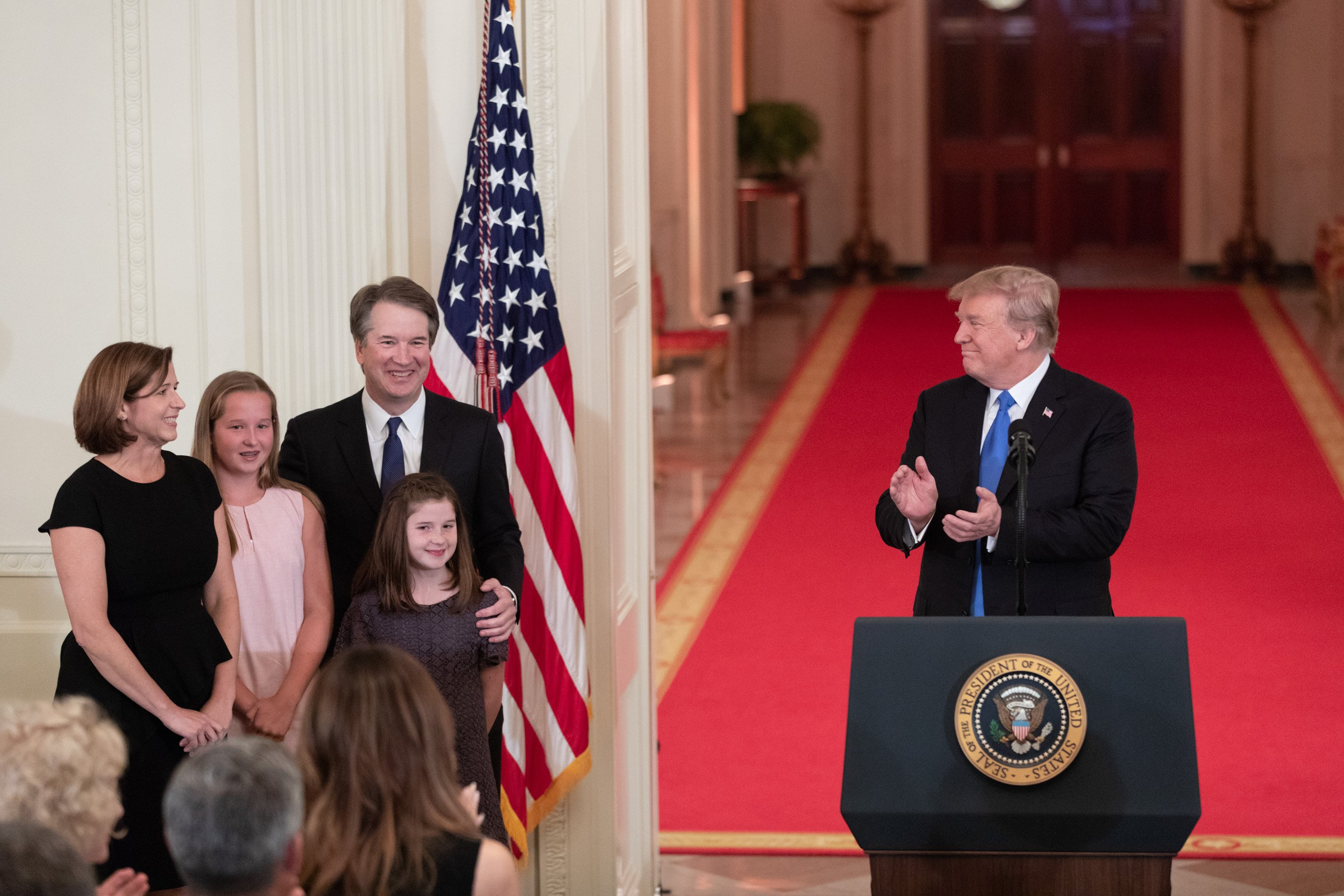
Trump with his second Supreme Court nominee,
Brett Kavanaugh

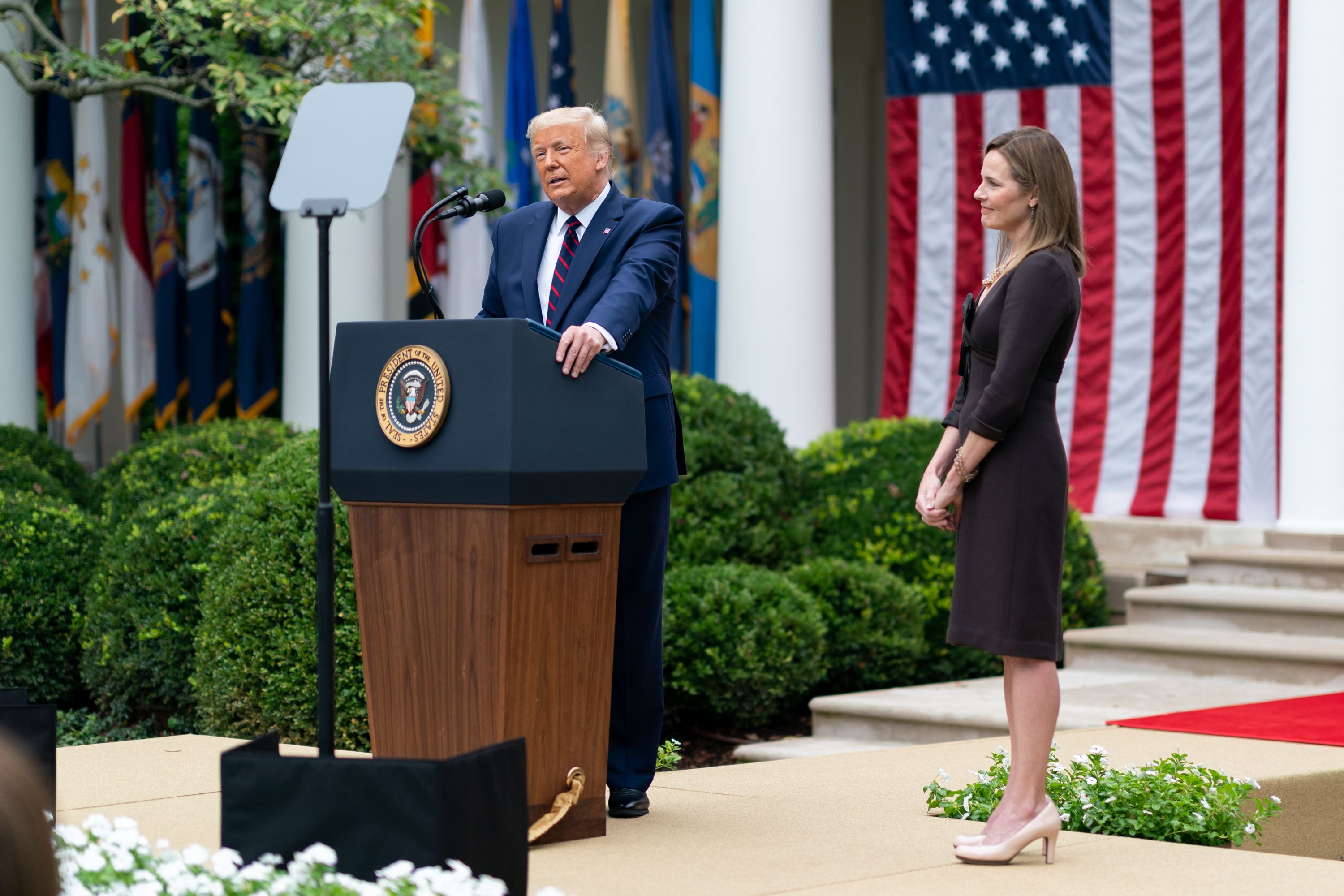
Trump with his third Supreme Court nominee,
Amy Coney Barrett

== United States Supreme Court ==
=== First administration ===
#	Justice	Seat	State	Former justice	Nomination date	Confirmation date	Confirmation vote	Began service (Note: Although under the Judiciary Act a judge must take the judicial oath "before performing the duties of his office", this article uses the date they receive their commission as the date they begin service because this information is readily available from the Federal Judicial Center. When a judge receives their commission and takes their judicial oath on different days, this will result in inconsistencies with other articles.)	Ended service
1	Neil Gorsuch	9	Colorado	Antonin Scalia	February 1, 2017	April 7, 2017	54–45	April 8, 2017	Incumbent
2	Brett Kavanaugh	1	Maryland	Anthony Kennedy	July 10, 2018	October 6, 2018	50–48 (Note: Sen. Lisa Murkowski (R-Alaska), who had announced her opposition to Kavanaugh's confirmation, voted "present" instead of "no" in order to accommodate Sen. Steve Daines' (R-Montana) absence, as he would have voted "yes". See Pair (parliamentary convention).)	October 6, 2018	Incumbent
3	Amy Coney Barrett	6	Indiana	Ruth Bader Ginsburg	September 29, 2020	October 26, 2020	52–48	October 26, 2020	Incumbent

== United States courts of appeals ==
=== First administration ===
#	Judge	Circuit	Nomination date	Confirmation date	Confirmation vote	Began active service	Ended active service	Ended senior status
1	Amul Thapar	Sixth	March 21, 2017	May 25, 2017	52–44	May 25, 2017	Incumbent	–
2	John K. Bush	Sixth	May 8, 2017	July 20, 2017	51–47	July 21, 2017	Incumbent	–
3	Kevin Newsom	Eleventh	May 8, 2017	August 1, 2017	66–31	August 2, 2017	Incumbent	–
4	Ralph R. Erickson	Eighth	June 7, 2017	September 28, 2017	95–1	October 12, 2017	July 28, 2026	Incumbent
5	Amy Coney Barrett	Seventh	May 8, 2017	October 31, 2017	55–43	November 2, 2017	October 26, 2020	Elevated
6	Joan Larsen	Sixth	May 8, 2017	November 1, 2017	60–38	November 2, 2017	Incumbent	–
7	Allison H. Eid	Tenth	June 7, 2017	November 2, 2017	56–41	November 3, 2017	Incumbent	–
8	Stephanos Bibas	Third	June 19, 2017	November 2, 2017	53–43	November 20, 2017	Incumbent	–
9	Gregory G. Katsas	D.C.	September 7, 2017	November 28, 2017	50–48	December 8, 2017	Incumbent	–
10	L. Steven Grasz	Eighth	August 3, 2017	December 12, 2017	50–48	January 3, 2018	Incumbent	–
11	Don Willett	Fifth	October 3, 2017	December 13, 2017	50–47	January 2, 2018	Incumbent	–
12	James C. Ho	Fifth	October 16, 2017	December 14, 2017	53–43	January 4, 2018	Incumbent	–
13	David Stras	Eighth	May 8, 2017 (Note: Initial nomination expired on January 3, 2018. Subsequently renominated on January 8, 2018.)	January 30, 2018	56–42	January 31, 2018	Incumbent	–
14	Elizabeth L. Branch	Eleventh	September 7, 2017	February 27, 2018	73–23	March 19, 2018	Incumbent	–
15	Kyle Duncan	Fifth	October 2, 2017	April 24, 2018	50–47	May 1, 2018	Incumbent	–
16	Kurt D. Engelhardt	Fifth	October 5, 2017	May 9, 2018	62–34	May 10, 2018	Incumbent	–
17	Michael B. Brennan	Seventh	August 3, 2017	May 10, 2018	49–46	May 11, 2018	Incumbent	–
18	Michael Y. Scudder	Seventh	February 15, 2018	May 14, 2018	90–0	May 21, 2018	Incumbent	–
19	Amy St. Eve	Seventh	February 15, 2018	May 14, 2018	91–0	May 23, 2018	Incumbent	–
20	Joel M. Carson III	Tenth	December 20, 2017	May 15, 2018	77–21	May 17, 2018	Incumbent	–
21	John Nalbandian	Sixth	January 24, 2018	May 15, 2018	53–45	May 17, 2018	Incumbent	–
22	Mark J. Bennett	Ninth	February 15, 2018	July 10, 2018	72–27	July 13, 2018	Incumbent	–
23	Andrew Oldham	Fifth	February 15, 2018	July 18, 2018	50–49	July 19, 2018	Incumbent	–
24	Britt Grant	Eleventh	April 10, 2018	July 31, 2018	52–46	August 3, 2018	Incumbent	–
25	A. Marvin Quattlebaum Jr.	Fourth	May 7, 2018	August 16, 2018	62–28	September 4, 2018	Incumbent	–
26	Julius N. Richardson	Fourth	May 7, 2018	August 16, 2018	81–8	August 20, 2018	Incumbent	–
27	David J. Porter	Third	April 12, 2018	October 11, 2018	50–45	October 15, 2018	Incumbent	–
28	Ryan D. Nelson	Ninth	May 15, 2018	October 11, 2018	51–44	October 18, 2018	Incumbent	–
29	Richard J. Sullivan	Second	May 7, 2018	October 11, 2018	79–16	October 17, 2018	Incumbent	–
30	Jonathan A. Kobes	Eighth	June 11, 2018	December 11, 2018	51–50	December 12, 2018	Incumbent	–
31	Eric D. Miller	Ninth	July 19, 2018 (Note: Initial nomination expired on January 3, 2019. Subsequently renominated on January 23, 2019.)	February 26, 2019	53–46	March 4, 2019	Incumbent	–
32	Allison Jones Rushing	Fourth	August 27, 2018	March 5, 2019	53–44	March 21, 2019	Incumbent	–
33	Chad Readler	Sixth	June 18, 2018	March 6, 2019	52–47	March 7, 2019	Incumbent	–
34	Eric E. Murphy	Sixth	June 18, 2018	March 7, 2019	52–46	March 11, 2019	Incumbent	–
35	Paul Matey	Third	April 12, 2018	March 12, 2019	54–45	March 18, 2019	Incumbent	–
36	Neomi Rao	D.C.	November 14, 2018	March 13, 2019	53–46	March 18, 2019	Incumbent	–
37	Bridget S. Bade	Ninth	August 27, 2018	March 26, 2019	78–21	April 1, 2019	Incumbent	–
38	Joseph F. Bianco	Second	November 13, 2018	May 8, 2019	54–42	May 13, 2019	Incumbent	–
39	Michael H. Park	Second	November 13, 2018	May 9, 2019	52–41	May 13, 2019	Incumbent	–
40	Kenneth K. Lee	Ninth	November 13, 2018 (Note: Initial nomination expired on January 3, 2019. Subsequently renominated on February 6, 2019.)	May 15, 2019	52–45	June 12, 2019	Incumbent	–
41	Daniel P. Collins	Ninth	November 13, 2018	May 21, 2019	53–46	May 22, 2019	Incumbent	–
42	Daniel Bress	Ninth	February 6, 2019	July 9, 2019	53–45	July 26, 2019	Incumbent	–
43	Peter J. Phipps	Third	May 13, 2019	July 16, 2019	56–40	July 17, 2019	Incumbent	–
44	Danielle J. Forrest	Ninth	September 19, 2019	November 6, 2019	73–17	November 12, 2019	Incumbent	–
45	William J. Nardini	Second	September 19, 2019	November 7, 2019	86–2	November 14, 2019	Incumbent	–
46	Steven Menashi	Second	September 9, 2019	November 14, 2019	51–41	November 14, 2019	Incumbent	–
47	Robert J. Luck	Eleventh	October 15, 2019	November 19, 2019	64–31	November 19, 2019	Incumbent	–
48	Barbara Lagoa	Eleventh	October 15, 2019	November 20, 2019	80–15	December 6, 2019	Incumbent	–
49	Patrick J. Bumatay	Ninth	October 15, 2019 (Note: Previously nominated to the Court of Appeals for the Ninth Circuit on November 13, 2018, which expired on January 3, 2019. Nominated to the District Court for the Southern District of California on February 6, 2019, which was withdrawn on October 15, 2019. Nominated to a different seat on the Ninth Circuit on October 15, 2019.)	December 10, 2019	53–40	December 12, 2019	Incumbent	–
50	Lawrence VanDyke	Ninth	October 15, 2019	December 11, 2019	51–44	January 2, 2020	Incumbent	–
51	Andrew L. Brasher	Eleventh	November 21, 2019 (Note: Initial nomination expired on January 3, 2020. Subsequently renominated on the same day.)	February 11, 2020	52–43	June 30, 2020	Incumbent	–
52	Justin R. Walker	D.C.	May 4, 2020	June 18, 2020	51–42	September 2, 2020	Incumbent	–
53	Cory T. Wilson	Fifth	May 4, 2020 (Note: Previously nominated to the United States District Court for the Southern District of Mississippi on October 15, 2019, that nomination expired on January 3, 2020. Subsequently renominated to district court on January 6, 2020. District court nomination withdrawn and nominated to the Fifth Circuit on May 4, 2020.)	June 24, 2020	52–48	July 3, 2020	Incumbent	–
54	Thomas Kirsch	Seventh	November 16, 2020	December 15, 2020	51–44	December 17, 2020	Incumbent	–

=== Second administration ===
*** Denotes nomination awaiting final confirmation by the full Senate
** Denotes nomination pending before the Senate Judiciary Committee
* Denotes nomination that has been announced but not yet submitted to the Senate

#	Judge	Circuit	Nomination date	Confirmation date	Confirmation vote	Began active service	Ended active service	Ended senior status
1	Whitney Hermandorfer	Sixth	May 12, 2025	July 14, 2025	46–42	July 17, 2025	Incumbent	–
2	Emil Bove	Third	June 16, 2025	July 29, 2025	50–49	September 2, 2025	Incumbent	–
3	Jennifer Mascott	Third	September 2, 2025	October 9, 2025	50–47	October 10, 2025	Incumbent	–
4	Rebecca Taibleson	Seventh	September 15, 2025	October 27, 2025	52–46	November 3, 2025	Incumbent	–
5	Joshua Dunlap	First	July 15, 2025	November 4, 2025	52–46	November 7, 2025	Incumbent	–
6	Eric Tung	Ninth	July 15, 2025	November 5, 2025	52–45	November 7, 2025	Incumbent	–
7	Justin D. Smith	Eighth	March 2, 2026	June 15, 2026	48–43	June 18, 2026	Incumbent	–
8	Matthew Schwartz	Second	April 27, 2026	July 14, 2026	50–45	July 24, 2026	Incumbent	–
9	Benjamin M. Flowers	Sixth	April 27, 2026	July 22, 2026	49–46	October 2, 2026	Incumbent	–
10	Daniel M. Traynor	Eighth	May 12, 2026	July 23, 2026	48–47	July 24, 2026	Incumbent	–
11	Daniel D. Domenico	Tenth	May 12, 2026	November 16, 2026	51–46	–	–	–
12	Anna St. John	Fifth	July 14, 2026	November 17, 2026	52–46	–	–	–
**	G. Todd Butler	Fifth	November 9, 2026	–	–	–	–	–
**	J. Cody Hiland	Eighth	November 10, 2026	–	–	–	–	–

== United States district courts ==
=== First administration ===
#	Judge	Court (Note: See List of United States district and territorial courts)	Nomination date	Confirmation date	Confirmation vote	Began active service	Ended active service	Ended senior status
1	David Nye	D. Idaho	May 8, 2017 (Note: Originally nominated on April 5, 2016, by President Barack Obama. That nomination expired on January 3, 2017. Renominated by President Trump on May 8, 2017.)	July 12, 2017	100–0	July 12, 2017	Incumbent	–
2	Timothy J. Kelly	D.D.C.	June 7, 2017	September 5, 2017	94–2	September 8, 2017	Incumbent	–
3	Scott L. Palk	W.D. Okla.	May 8, 2017 (Note: Originally nominated on December 16, 2015, by President Obama. That nomination expired on January 3, 2017. Renominated by President Trump on May 8, 2017.)	October 26, 2017	79–16	October 31, 2017	Incumbent	–
4	Trevor N. McFadden	D.D.C.	June 7, 2017	October 30, 2017	84–10	October 31, 2017	Incumbent	–
5	Donald C. Coggins Jr.	D.S.C.	August 3, 2017 (Note: Originally nominated on February 25, 2016, by President Obama. That nomination expired on January 3, 2017. Renominated by President Trump on August 3, 2017.)	November 16, 2017	96–0	November 20, 2017	Incumbent	–
6	Dabney L. Friedrich	D.D.C.	June 7, 2017	November 27, 2017	97–3	December 1, 2017	Incumbent	–
7	William L. Campbell Jr.	M.D. Tenn.	July 13, 2017	January 9, 2018	97–0	January 12, 2018	Incumbent	–
8	Tommy Parker	W.D. Tenn.	July 13, 2017	January 10, 2018	98–0	January 30, 2018	Incumbent	–
9	Michael Lawrence Brown	N.D. Ga.	July 13, 2017	January 11, 2018	92–0	January 17, 2018	Incumbent	–
10	David Counts	W.D. Tex.	September 11, 2017 (Note: Originally nominated on March 15, 2016, by President Obama. That nomination expired on January 3, 2017. Renominated by President Trump on September 11, 2017.)	January 11, 2018	96–0	January 17, 2018	Incumbent	–
11	A. Marvin Quattlebaum Jr.	D.S.C.	August 3, 2017	March 1, 2018	69–28	March 6, 2018	September 6, 2018	Elevated
12	Karen Gren Scholer	N.D. Tex.	September 7, 2017 (Note: Originally nominated on March 15, 2016, by President Obama to the Eastern District of Texas. That nomination expired on January 3, 2017. Renominated by President Trump to the Northern District of Texas on September 7, 2017.)	March 5, 2018	95–0	March 6, 2018	Incumbent	–
13	Tripp Self	M.D. Ga.	July 13, 2017	March 5, 2018	85–11	March 7, 2018	Incumbent	–
14	Terry A. Doughty	W.D. La.	August 3, 2017	March 6, 2018	98–0	March 7, 2018	Incumbent	–
15	Claria Horn Boom	E.D. Ky. W.D. Ky.	June 12, 2017	April 10, 2018	96–1	April 11, 2018	Incumbent	–
16	John W. Broomes	D. Kan.	September 7, 2017	April 12, 2018	voice vote	April 16, 2018	Incumbent	–
17	Rebecca Grady Jennings	W.D. Ky.	September 7, 2017	April 12, 2018	voice vote	April 19, 2018	Incumbent	–
18	Robert E. Wier	E.D. Ky.	August 3, 2017	June 5, 2018	95–0	June 12, 2018	Incumbent	–
19	Fernando Rodriguez Jr.	S.D. Tex.	September 7, 2017	June 5, 2018	96–0	June 12, 2018	Incumbent	–
20	Annemarie Axon	N.D. Ala.	July 19, 2017	June 6, 2018	83–11	June 12, 2018	Incumbent	–
21	Emily C. Marks	M.D. Ala.	September 7, 2017	August 1, 2018	voice vote	August 3, 2018	Incumbent	–
22	Jeff Beaverstock	S.D. Ala.	September 7, 2017	August 1, 2018	voice vote	August 3, 2018	Incumbent	–
23	Holly Teeter	D. Kan.	August 3, 2017	August 1, 2018	voice vote	August 3, 2018	Incumbent	–
24	Colm Connolly	D. Del.	December 20, 2017 (Note: Originally nominated on February 26, 2008, by President George W. Bush. That nomination expired on January 2, 2009. Renominated by President Trump to a different seat on the same court on December 20, 2017.)	August 1, 2018	voice vote	August 3, 2018	Incumbent	–
25	Maryellen Noreika	D. Del.	December 20, 2017	August 1, 2018	voice vote	August 9, 2018	Incumbent	–
26	Jill Otake	D. Haw.	December 21, 2017	August 1, 2018	voice vote	August 3, 2018	Incumbent	–
27	Terry F. Moorer	S.D. Ala.	September 7, 2017	August 28, 2018	voice vote	September 4, 2018	Incumbent	–
28	R. Stan Baker	S.D. Ga.	September 7, 2017	August 28, 2018	voice vote	August 30, 2018	Incumbent	–
29	Charles Barnes Goodwin	W.D. Okla.	July 13, 2017	August 28, 2018	52–42	August 30, 2018	Incumbent	–
30	Barry Ashe	E.D. La.	October 2, 2017	August 28, 2018	voice vote	August 30, 2018	Incumbent	–
31	James R. Sweeney II	S.D. Ind.	November 1, 2017	August 28, 2018	voice vote	September 13, 2018	Incumbent	–
32	Susan Paradise Baxter	W.D. Pa.	December 20, 2017 (Note: Originally nominated on July 30, 2015, by President Obama. That nomination expired on January 3, 2017. Renominated by President Trump on December 20, 2017.)	August 28, 2018	voice vote	September 10, 2018	Incumbent	–
33	Nancy E. Brasel	D. Minn.	February 15, 2018	August 28, 2018	voice vote	September 13, 2018	Incumbent	–
34	Marilyn Horan	W.D. Pa.	December 20, 2017 (Note: Originally nominated on July 30, 2015, by President Obama. That nomination expired on January 3, 2017. Renominated by President Trump to a different seat on the same court on December 20, 2017.)	September 6, 2018	voice vote	September 19, 2018	Incumbent	–
35	William F. Jung	M.D. Fla.	December 21, 2017 (Note: Originally nominated on July 10, 2008, by President Bush. That nomination expired on January 2, 2009. Renominated on April 28, 2016, by President Obama to a different seat on the same court. That nomination expired on January 3, 2017. Renominated by President Trump on December 21, 2017.)	September 6, 2018	voice vote	September 10, 2018	Incumbent	–
36	Kari A. Dooley	D. Conn.	December 20, 2017	September 6, 2018	voice vote	September 13, 2018	Incumbent	–
37	Dominic W. Lanza	D. Ariz.	January 24, 2018	September 6, 2018	60–35	September 10, 2018	Incumbent	–
38	C. J. Williams	N.D. Iowa	February 15, 2018	September 6, 2018	79–12	September 10, 2018	Incumbent	–
39	Robert R. Summerhays	W.D. La.	January 24, 2018	September 6, 2018	voice vote	September 19, 2018	Incumbent	–
40	Eric C. Tostrud	D. Minn.	February 15, 2018	September 6, 2018	voice vote	September 10, 2018	Incumbent	–
41	Alan Albright	W.D. Tex.	January 24, 2018	September 6, 2018	voice vote	September 10, 2018	August 31, 2026	–
42	William M. Ray II	N.D. Ga.	July 13, 2017	October 11, 2018	54–41	October 25, 2018	Incumbent	–
43	Liles C. Burke	N.D. Ala.	July 19, 2017	October 11, 2018	55–40	October 17, 2018	Incumbent	–
44	Michael J. Juneau	W.D. La.	August 3, 2017	October 11, 2018	54–41	October 17, 2018	February 1, 2022	May 12, 2023
45	Mark Norris	W.D. Tenn.	July 13, 2017	October 11, 2018	51–44	November 8, 2018	Incumbent	–
46	Eli J. Richardson	M.D. Tenn.	July 13, 2017	October 11, 2018	52–43	October 18, 2018	Incumbent	–
47	Tom Kleeh	N.D. W. Va.	February 15, 2018	October 11, 2018	65–30	November 5, 2018	Incumbent	–
48	Jeremy Kernodle	E.D. Tex.	January 23, 2018	October 11, 2018	voice vote	November 2, 2018	Incumbent	–
49	Peter J. Phipps	W.D. Pa.	February 15, 2018	October 11, 2018	voice vote	October 17, 2018	July 22, 2019	Elevated
50	Susan Brnovich	D. Ariz.	January 24, 2018	October 11, 2018	voice vote	October 23, 2018	Incumbent	–
51	Chad F. Kenney	E.D. Pa.	December 20, 2017	October 11, 2018	voice vote	October 24, 2018	Incumbent	–
52	J. P. Hanlon	S.D. Ind.	April 12, 2018	October 11, 2018	voice vote	November 5, 2018	Incumbent	–
53	Lance E. Walker	D. Me.	April 10, 2018	October 11, 2018	voice vote	October 17, 2018	Incumbent	–
54	Roy Altman	S.D. Fla.	May 7, 2018	April 4, 2019	66–33	April 9, 2019	Incumbent	–
55	Daniel D. Domenico	D. Colo.	October 2, 2017 (Note: Initial nomination expired on January 3, 2018. Subsequent renomination on January 8, 2018, expired on January 3, 2019. Renominated again on January 23, 2019.)	April 9, 2019	57–42	May 7, 2019	Incumbent	–
56	Patrick Wyrick	W.D. Okla.	April 10, 2018	April 9, 2019	53–47	April 10, 2019	Incumbent	–
57	Holly A. Brady	N.D. Ind.	April 10, 2018	April 10, 2019	56–42	April 16, 2019	Incumbent	–
58	David S. Morales	S.D. Tex.	April 12, 2018	April 10, 2019	56–41	April 25, 2019	Incumbent	–
59	J. Campbell Barker	E.D. Tex.	January 23, 2018	May 1, 2019	51–47	May 3, 2019	Incumbent	–
60	Andrew L. Brasher	M.D. Ala.	April 10, 2018	May 1, 2019	52–47	May 3, 2019	June 30, 2020	Elevated
61	Rodolfo Ruiz	S.D. Fla.	May 7, 2018	May 2, 2019	90–8	May 3, 2019	Incumbent	–
62	Raúl M. Arias-Marxuach	D.P.R.	April 12, 2018	May 2, 2019	95–3	May 13, 2019	Incumbent	–
63	Joshua Wolson	E.D. Pa.	May 15, 2018	May 2, 2019	65–33	May 28, 2019	Incumbent	–
64	Michael J. Truncale	E.D. Tex.	January 23, 2018	May 14, 2019	49–46	May 16, 2019	Incumbent	–
65	Wendy Vitter	E.D. La.	January 23, 2018	May 16, 2019	52–45	May 29, 2019	Incumbent	–
66	Howard C. Nielson Jr.	D. Utah	September 28, 2017	May 22, 2019	51–47	June 12, 2019	Incumbent	–
67	Stephen R. Clark	E.D. Mo.	April 12, 2018	May 22, 2019	53–45	June 12, 2019	Incumbent	–
68	Carl J. Nichols	D.D.C.	June 18, 2018	May 22, 2019	55–43	June 25, 2019	Incumbent	–
69	Kenneth D. Bell	W.D.N.C.	April 12, 2018	May 22, 2019	55–43	June 12, 2019	Incumbent	–
70	Rossie D. Alston Jr.	E.D. Va.	June 18, 2018	June 10, 2019	75–20	June 12, 2019	Incumbent	–
71	Sarah D. Morrison	S.D. Ohio	April 12, 2018	June 11, 2019	89–7	June 14, 2019	Incumbent	–
72	Pamela Barker	N.D. Ohio	April 12, 2018	June 12, 2019	91–5	June 18, 2019	Incumbent	–
73	Corey L. Maze	N.D. Ala.	May 15, 2018	June 12, 2019	62–34	June 18, 2019	Incumbent	–
74	Rodney Smith	S.D. Fla.	May 7, 2018	June 12, 2019	78–18	June 14, 2019	Incumbent	–
75	Thomas Barber	M.D. Fla.	May 7, 2018	June 12, 2019	77–19	July 11, 2019	Incumbent	–
76	J. P. Boulee	N.D. Ga.	August 28, 2018	June 12, 2019	85–11	June 14, 2019	Incumbent	–
77	Matthew Kacsmaryk	N.D. Tex.	September 7, 2017	June 19, 2019	52–46	June 21, 2019	Incumbent	–
78	Allen Winsor	N.D. Fla.	April 10, 2018	June 19, 2019	54–44	June 21, 2019	Incumbent	–
79	James D. Cain Jr.	W.D. La.	August 28, 2018	June 19, 2019	77–21	June 25, 2019	Incumbent	–
80	Greg G. Guidry	E.D. La.	January 17, 2019	June 19, 2019	53–46	June 21, 2019	Incumbent	–
81	T. Kent Wetherell II	N.D. Fla.	May 7, 2018	July 10, 2019	78–15	July 12, 2019	Incumbent	–
82	Nicholas Ranjan	W.D. Pa.	July 24, 2018	July 10, 2019	80–14	July 12, 2019	Incumbent	–
83	Damon R. Leichty	N.D. Ind.	July 17, 2018	July 10, 2019	85–10	July 26, 2019	Incumbent	–
84	Clifton L. Corker	E.D. Tenn.	November 13, 2018	July 18, 2019	55–39	July 22, 2019	Incumbent	–
85	Wendy Berger	M.D. Fla.	April 10, 2018	July 24, 2019	54–37	July 29, 2019	Incumbent	–
86	Brian C. Buescher	D. Neb.	November 13, 2018	July 24, 2019	51–40	August 6, 2019	Incumbent	–
87	Michael T. Liburdi	D. Ariz.	January 17, 2019	July 30, 2019	53–37	August 5, 2019	Incumbent	–
88	Peter D. Welte	D.N.D.	January 17, 2019	July 30, 2019	68–22	August 5, 2019	Incumbent	–
89	James Wesley Hendrix	N.D. Tex.	January 17, 2019 (Note: Originally nominated on March 15, 2016, by President Obama. That nomination expired on January 3, 2017. Renominated by President Trump to a different seat on the same court on January 17, 2019.)	July 30, 2019	89–1	August 8, 2019	Incumbent	–
90	Sean D. Jordan	E.D. Tex.	January 17, 2019	July 30, 2019	54–34	August 20, 2019	Incumbent	–
91	Karin Immergut	D. Ore.	June 11, 2018	July 31, 2019	voice vote	August 5, 2019	Incumbent	–
92	John Milton Younge	E.D. Pa.	July 17, 2018 (Note: Originally nominated on July 30, 2015, by President Obama. That nomination expired on January 3, 2017. Renominated by President Trump on July 17, 2018. That nomination expired on January 3, 2019. Subsequently renominated on January 23, 2019.)	July 31, 2019	voice vote	August 20, 2019	Incumbent	–
93	Mary M. Rowland	N.D. Ill.	June 18, 2018 (Note: Originally nominated on June 18, 2018. That nomination expired on January 3, 2019. Subsequently renominated on May 21, 2019.)	July 31, 2019	voice vote	August 20, 2019	Incumbent	–
94	Mark T. Pittman	N.D. Tex.	January 17, 2019	July 31, 2019	54–36	August 5, 2019	Incumbent	–
95	Jeff Brown	S.D. Tex.	March 11, 2019	July 31, 2019	50–40	September 4, 2019	Incumbent	–
96	Brantley Starr	N.D. Tex.	March 11, 2019	July 31, 2019	51–39	August 6, 2019	Incumbent	–
97	Jason K. Pulliam	W.D. Tex.	March 5, 2019	July 31, 2019	54–36	August 5, 2019	Incumbent	–
98	Martha M. Pacold	N.D. Ill.	June 11, 2018 (Note: Originally nominated on June 11, 2018. That nomination expired on January 3, 2019. Subsequently renominated on May 21, 2019.)	July 31, 2019	87–3	August 19, 2019	Incumbent	–
99	William S. Stickman IV	W.D. Pa.	May 13, 2019	July 31, 2019	56–34	August 5, 2019	Incumbent	–
100	Stephanie L. Haines	W.D. Pa.	March 5, 2019	September 11, 2019	94–0	September 30, 2019	Incumbent	–
101	Ada Brown	N.D. Tex.	March 26, 2019	September 11, 2019	80–13	September 13, 2019	Incumbent	–
102	Steven D. Grimberg	N.D. Ga.	April 4, 2019	September 11, 2019	75–18	September 13, 2019	Incumbent	–
103	Steven C. Seeger	N.D. Ill.	June 18, 2018	September 11, 2019	90–1	September 13, 2019	Incumbent	–
104	Mary S. McElroy	D.R.I.	April 12, 2018 (Note: Originally nominated on September 8, 2015, by President Obama. That nomination expired on January 3, 2017. Renominated by President Trump on April 12, 2018. That nomination expired on January 3, 2019. Subsequently renominated on May 21, 2019.)	September 11, 2019	voice vote	September 30, 2019	Incumbent	–
105	Stephanie A. Gallagher	D. Md.	June 11, 2018 (Note: Originally nominated on September 8, 2015, by President Obama. That nomination expired on January 3, 2017. Renominated by President Trump on June 11, 2018. That nomination expired on January 3, 2019. Subsequently renominated on May 21, 2019.)	September 11, 2019	voice vote	September 13, 2019	Incumbent	–
106	Frank W. Volk	S.D. W. Va.	April 4, 2019	October 16, 2019	92–0	October 17, 2019	Incumbent	–
107	Charles R. Eskridge III	S.D. Tex.	May 13, 2019	October 16, 2019	61–31	October 17, 2019	Incumbent	–
108	David J. Novak	E.D. Va.	March 26, 2019 (Note: Originally nominated on November 15, 2007, by President Bush. That nomination expired on January 2, 2009. Renominated by President Trump to a different seat on the same court on March 26, 2019.)	October 16, 2019	89–3	October 17, 2019	Incumbent	–
109	Rachel Kovner	E.D.N.Y.	May 15, 2018 (Note: Originally nominated on May 15, 2018. That nomination expired on January 3, 2019. Subsequently renominated on May 21, 2019.)	October 16, 2019	88–3	October 17, 2019	Incumbent	–
110	Justin R. Walker	W.D. Ky.	June 24, 2019	October 24, 2019	50–41	October 25, 2019	September 2, 2020	Elevated
111	Lee Rudofsky	E.D. Ark.	July 8, 2019	November 7, 2019	51–41	November 8, 2019	Incumbent	–
112	Jennifer P. Wilson	M.D. Pa.	May 13, 2019	November 7, 2019	88–3	November 8, 2019	Incumbent	–
113	Eric R. Komitee	E.D.N.Y.	May 15, 2018	December 3, 2019	86–4	December 5, 2019	Incumbent	–
114	John Sinatra	W.D.N.Y.	May 15, 2018	December 4, 2019	75–18	December 5, 2019	Incumbent	–
115	Sarah Pitlyk	E.D. Mo.	September 9, 2019	December 4, 2019	49–44	December 5, 2019	Incumbent	–
116	Douglas R. Cole	S.D. Ohio	May 13, 2019	December 4, 2019	63–30	December 5, 2019	Incumbent	–
117	R. Austin Huffaker Jr.	M.D. Ala.	July 8, 2019	December 4, 2019	89–4	December 12, 2019	Incumbent	–
118	David Barlow	D. Utah	June 12, 2019	December 4, 2019	88–4	January 6, 2020	Incumbent	–
119	Richard E. Myers II	E.D.N.C.	September 9, 2019	December 5, 2019	68–21	December 10, 2019	Incumbent	–
120	Sherri Lydon	D.S.C.	October 15, 2019	December 5, 2019	76–13	December 10, 2019	Incumbent	–
121	Matthew W. McFarland	S.D. Ohio	November 13, 2018	December 18, 2019	56–38	December 31, 2019	Incumbent	–
122	Raag Singhal	S.D. Fla.	September 9, 2019	December 19, 2019	76–17	December 20, 2019	Incumbent	–
123	Karen S. Marston	E.D. Pa.	September 9, 2019	December 19, 2019	87–6	December 20, 2019	Incumbent	–
124	Daniel M. Traynor	D.N.D.	September 19, 2019	December 19, 2019	51–41	January 13, 2020	July 28, 2026	Elevated
125	Jodi W. Dishman	W.D. Okla.	September 9, 2019	December 19, 2019	75–17	December 20, 2019	Incumbent	–
126	John M. Gallagher	E.D. Pa.	October 15, 2019	December 19, 2019	83–9	December 31, 2019	Incumbent	–
127	Bernard M. Jones	W.D. Okla.	October 17, 2019	December 19, 2019	91–3	December 31, 2019	Incumbent	–
128	Mary Kay Vyskocil	S.D.N.Y.	May 15, 2018	December 19, 2019	91–3	December 20, 2019	Incumbent	–
129	Kea W. Riggs	D.N.M.	May 13, 2019	December 19, 2019	94–0	December 31, 2019	Incumbent	–
130	Robert J. Colville	W.D. Pa.	March 5, 2019 (Note: Originally nominated on July 30, 2015, by President Obama. That nomination expired on January 3, 2017. Renominated by President Trump to a different seat on the same court on March 5, 2019.)	December 19, 2019	66–27	December 31, 2019	Incumbent	–
131	Lewis J. Liman	S.D.N.Y.	May 15, 2018	December 19, 2019	64–29	December 31, 2019	Incumbent	–
132	Gary R. Brown	E.D.N.Y.	May 15, 2018 (Note: Originally nominated on July 30, 2015, by President Obama. That nomination expired on January 3, 2017. Renominated by President Trump on May 15, 2018. That nomination expired on January 3, 2019. Subsequently renominated on May 21, 2019.)	December 19, 2019	voice vote	December 31, 2019	Incumbent	–
133	Stephanie D. Davis	E.D. Mich.	March 11, 2019	December 19, 2019	voice vote	December 31, 2019	June 14, 2022	Elevated
134	Joshua Kindred	D. Alaska	November 21, 2019	February 12, 2020	54–41	February 18, 2020	July 8, 2024	–
135	Matthew T. Schelp	E.D. Mo.	December 2, 2019	February 12, 2020	72–23	August 4, 2020	Incumbent	–
136	John F. Kness	N.D. Ill.	June 24, 2019	February 12, 2020	81–12	February 18, 2020	Incumbent	–
137	Philip M. Halpern	S.D.N.Y.	November 13, 2018	February 12, 2020	77–19	February 21, 2020	Incumbent	–
138	Silvia Carreño-Coll	D.P.R.	October 15, 2019	February 25, 2020	96–0	February 26, 2020	Incumbent	–
139	Scott H. Rash	D. Ariz.	October 15, 2019	May 19, 2020	74–20	May 27, 2020	Incumbent	–
140	Anna M. Manasco	N.D. Ala.	February 4, 2020	May 20, 2020	71–21	May 27, 2020	Incumbent	–
141	John F. Heil III	E.D. Okla. N.D. Okla. W.D. Okla.	December 2, 2019 (Note: Initial nomination expired on January 3, 2020. Subsequently renominated on January 6, 2020.)	May 20, 2020	75–17	May 27, 2020	Incumbent	–
142	John Badalamenti	M.D. Fla.	February 4, 2020	June 1, 2020	55–22	June 4, 2020	Incumbent	–
143	Drew B. Tipton	S.D. Tex.	February 4, 2020	June 3, 2020	52–41	June 15, 2020	Incumbent	–
144	W. Scott Hardy	W.D. Pa.	December 2, 2019	July 27, 2020	65–30	July 31, 2020	Incumbent	–
145	David C. Joseph	W.D. La.	December 2, 2019	July 28, 2020	55–42	July 31, 2020	Incumbent	–
146	John P. Cronan	S.D.N.Y.	December 2, 2019 (Note: Initial nomination expired on January 3, 2020. Subsequently renominated on February 27, 2020.)	August 6, 2020	55–42	August 10, 2020	Incumbent	–
147	Brett H. Ludwig	E.D. Wis.	March 3, 2020	September 9, 2020	91–5	September 10, 2020	Incumbent	–
148	Christy C. Wiegand	W.D. Pa.	February 12, 2020	September 9, 2020	82–14	September 11, 2020	Incumbent	–
149	Hala Y. Jarbou	W.D. Mich.	March 18, 2020	September 10, 2020	83–15	September 23, 2020	Incumbent	–
150	Thomas T. Cullen	W.D. Va.	February 4, 2020	September 10, 2020	79–19	September 15, 2020	Incumbent	–
151	Diane Gujarati	E.D.N.Y.	May 15, 2018 (Note: Originally nominated on September 13, 2016, by President Obama. That nomination expired on January 3, 2017. Renominated by President Trump on May 15, 2018. That nomination expired on January 3, 2019. Subsequently renominated on May 21, 2019.)	September 10, 2020	99–0	September 18, 2020	Incumbent	–
152	Mark C. Scarsi	C.D. Cal.	November 13, 2018 (Note: Initial nomination expired on January 3, 2019. Renominated on February 6, 2019. That nomination expired on January 3, 2020. Subsequently renominated on January 9, 2020.)	September 15, 2020	83–12	September 18, 2020	Incumbent	–
153	Stanley Blumenfeld	C.D. Cal.	November 13, 2018	September 15, 2020	92–4	September 18, 2020	Incumbent	–
154	John W. Holcomb	C.D. Cal.	November 21, 2019 (Note: Initial nomination expired on January 3, 2020. Subsequently renominated on February 13, 2020.)	September 15, 2020	83–12	September 18, 2020	Incumbent	–
155	Todd W. Robinson	S.D. Cal.	November 21, 2019	September 16, 2020	86–10	September 18, 2020	Incumbent	–
156	David W. Dugan	S.D. Ill.	February 12, 2020	September 16, 2020	55–41	September 23, 2020	Incumbent	–
157	Stephen P. McGlynn	S.D. Ill.	February 4, 2020	September 16, 2020	55–41	September 18, 2020	Incumbent	–
158	Franklin U. Valderrama	N.D. Ill.	February 12, 2020	September 17, 2020	68–26	September 23, 2020	Incumbent	–
159	Iain D. Johnston	N.D. Ill.	February 12, 2020	September 17, 2020	77–14	September 23, 2020	Incumbent	–
160	John C. Hinderaker	D. Ariz.	December 2, 2019	September 23, 2020	70–27	September 29, 2020	Incumbent	–
161	Roderick C. Young	E.D. Va.	May 21, 2020	September 24, 2020	93–2	September 29, 2020	Incumbent	–
162	Michael J. Newman	S.D. Ohio	March 3, 2020	October 22, 2020	67–30	November 10, 2020	Incumbent	–
163	James R. Knepp II	N.D. Ohio	March 3, 2020	November 10, 2020	64–24	November 13, 2020	Incumbent	–
164	Aileen Cannon	S.D. Fla.	May 21, 2020	November 12, 2020	56–21	November 13, 2020	Incumbent	–
165	Kristi Haskins Johnson	S.D. Miss.	May 4, 2020	November 17, 2020	53–43	December 1, 2020	Incumbent	–
166	Benjamin Beaton	W.D. Ky.	September 8, 2020	November 17, 2020	52–44	December 1, 2020	Incumbent	–
167	Toby Crouse	D. Kan.	May 21, 2020	November 17, 2020	50–43	December 2, 2020	Incumbent	–
168	Kathryn Kimball Mizelle	M.D. Fla.	September 8, 2020	November 18, 2020	49–41	November 20, 2020	Incumbent	–
169	Taylor B. McNeel	S.D. Miss.	July 2, 2020	December 1, 2020	53–39	December 14, 2020	Incumbent	–
170	J. Philip Calabrese	N.D. Ohio	March 3, 2020	December 1, 2020	58–35	December 3, 2020	Incumbent	–
171	Katherine A. Crytzer	E.D. Tenn.	September 22, 2020	December 16, 2020	48–47	December 22, 2020	Incumbent	–
172	Joseph Dawson III	D.S.C.	October 23, 2020	December 16, 2020	56–39	December 22, 2020	Incumbent	–
173	Charles E. Atchley Jr.	E.D. Tenn.	September 22, 2020	December 17, 2020	54–41	December 22, 2020	Incumbent	–
174	Fernando Aenlle-Rocha	C.D. Cal.	October 17, 2019 (Note: Initial nomination expired on January 3, 2020. Subsequently renominated on January 9, 2020.)	December 20, 2020	80–8	December 22, 2020	Incumbent	–

=== Second administration ===
*** Denotes nomination awaiting final confirmation by the full Senate
** Denotes nomination pending before the Senate Judiciary Committee
* Denotes nomination that has been announced but not yet submitted to the Senate

#	Judge	District	Nomination date	Confirmation date	Confirmation vote	Began active service	Ended active service	Ended senior status
1	Josh Divine	E.D. Mo. W.D. Mo.	May 12, 2025	July 22, 2025	51–46	July 24, 2025	Incumbent	–
2	Cristian Stevens	E.D. Mo.	May 12, 2025	July 22, 2025	50–47	July 23, 2025	Incumbent	–
3	Zack Bluestone	E.D. Mo.	May 12, 2025	July 23, 2025	49–47	July 24, 2025	Incumbent	–
4	Ed Artau	S.D. Fla.	June 16, 2025	September 8, 2025	50–43	September 9, 2025	Incumbent	–
5	Maria Lanahan	E.D. Mo.	May 12, 2025	September 9, 2025	52–45	September 24, 2025	Incumbent	–
6	Kyle Dudek	M.D. Fla.	June 16, 2025	September 9, 2025	53–45	September 11, 2025	Incumbent	–
7	Harold Mooty	N.D. Ala.	September 2, 2025	October 21, 2025	66–32	October 21, 2025	Incumbent	–
8	Anne-Leigh Gaylord Moe	M.D. Fla.	June 16, 2025	October 21, 2025	53–46	October 24, 2025	Incumbent	–
9	William W. Mercer	D. Mont.	July 15, 2025	October 22, 2025	52–45	November 6, 2025	Incumbent	–
10	Chad Meredith	E.D. Ky.	June 23, 2025	October 23, 2025	48–45	November 3, 2025	Incumbent	–
11	Bill Lewis	M.D. Ala.	September 2, 2025	October 27, 2025	58–40	November 6, 2025	Incumbent	–
12	Jordan Pratt	M.D. Fla.	June 16, 2025	October 28, 2025	52–47	November 3, 2025	Incumbent	–
13	Edmund LaCour	N.D. Ala.	September 2, 2025 (Note: Previously nominated to the United States District Court for the Middle District of Alabama on May 20, 2020; that nomination expired on January 3, 2021. Subsequently renominated on the same day. That nomination was withdrawn by President Joe Biden on February 4, 2021.)	October 29, 2025	51–47	November 3, 2025	Incumbent	–
14	David A. Bragdon	M.D.N.C.	September 15, 2025	December 2, 2025	53–45	December 12, 2025	Incumbent	–
15	Lindsey Freeman	M.D.N.C.	September 15, 2025	December 2, 2025	60–39	December 19, 2025	Incumbent	–
16	Matthew Orso	W.D.N.C.	September 15, 2025	December 3, 2025	57–41	December 12, 2025	Incumbent	–
17	Susan C. Rodriguez	W.D.N.C.	September 15, 2025	December 4, 2025	57–32	December 6, 2025	Incumbent	–
18	Robert P. Chamberlin	N.D. Miss.	September 2, 2025	December 9, 2025	51–46	December 16, 2025	Incumbent	–
19	William J. Crain	E.D. La.	October 21, 2025	December 9, 2025	49–46	December 19, 2025	Incumbent	–
20	James D. Maxwell II	N.D. Miss.	September 2, 2025	December 9, 2025	51–46	December 18, 2025	Incumbent	–
21	Alexander Van Hook	W.D. La.	October 21, 2025	January 8, 2026	53–40	January 12, 2026	Incumbent	–
22	David Clay Fowlkes	W.D. Ark.	November 18, 2025 (Note: Initial nomination expired on January 3, 2026. Subsequently renominated on January 5, 2026.)	February 3, 2026	54–40	February 6, 2026	Incumbent	–
23	Nicholas Ganjei	S.D. Tex.	November 18, 2025	February 3, 2026	51–45	March 10, 2026	Incumbent	–
24	Aaron C. Peterson	D. Alaska	November 18, 2025	February 4, 2026	58–39	February 10, 2026	Incumbent	–
25	Megan Benton	W.D. Mo.	December 1, 2025	February 4, 2026	51–46	February 10, 2026	Incumbent	–
26	Brian C. Lea	W.D. Tenn.	December 1, 2025	February 5, 2026	50–46	March 2, 2026	Incumbent	–
27	Justin R. Olson	S.D. Ind.	December 1, 2025	February 5, 2026	50–47	February 18, 2026	Incumbent	–
28	Anna St. John	E.D. La.	January 29, 2026	March 17, 2026	51–45	April 13, 2026	Incumbent	–
29	John T. Shepherd	W.D. Ark.	January 29, 2026	April 14, 2026	53–46	April 23, 2026	Incumbent	–
30	Chris Wolfe	W.D. Tex.	January 29, 2026	April 14, 2026	53–47	April 23, 2026	Incumbent	–
31	Andrew B. Davis	W.D. Tex.	January 29, 2026	April 20, 2026	47–46	April 30, 2026	Incumbent	–
32	Sheria Clarke	D.S.C.	March 2, 2026	May 19, 2026	52–38	June 18, 2026	Incumbent	–
33	Katie Lane	D. Mont.	March 2, 2026	June 2, 2026	52–46	June 18, 2026	Incumbent	–
34	Jeffrey M. Kuhlman	D. Kan.	March 2, 2026	June 2, 2026	52–46	June 18, 2026	Incumbent	–
35	Tony Mattivi	D. Kan.	March 2, 2026	June 9, 2026	51–46	June 18, 2026	Incumbent	–
36	Anthony J. Powell	D. Kan.	March 2, 2026	June 10, 2026	50–44	June 18, 2026	Incumbent	–
37	John Marck	S.D. Tex.	April 14, 2026	June 24, 2026	52–45	July 9, 2026	Incumbent	–
38	Michael Hendershot	N.D. Ohio	April 14, 2026	June 24, 2026	50–44	July 9, 2026	Incumbent	–
39	Arthur R. Jones	S.D. Tex.	April 14, 2026	July 13, 2026	46–44	July 29, 2026	Incumbent	–
40	Jeffrey Kuntz	S.D. Fla.	April 14, 2026	July 15, 2026	51–46	August 10, 2026	Incumbent	–
41	Michael C. Martin	E.D. Mich.	May 12, 2026	July 22, 2026	62–36	July 29, 2026	Incumbent	–
42	Antonio Pozos	E.D. Pa.	May 12, 2026	July 23, 2026	49–44	August 10, 2026	Incumbent	–
43	Matthew R. Byrne	S.D. Ohio	June 15, 2026	September 15, 2026	52–45	September 30, 2026	Incumbent	–
44	Kasdin Mitchell	N.D. Tex.	May 12, 2026	September 17, 2026	49–45	October 2, 2026	Incumbent	–
45	Angela Colmenero	S.D. Tex.	May 12, 2026	September 23, 2026	50–47	October 22, 2026	Incumbent	–
46	Greg Cook	N.D. Ala.	July 14, 2026	November 12, 2026	49–27	–	–	–
47	Richard W. Bennett	S.D. Tex.	September 14, 2026	November 20, 2026	49–43	–	–	–
48	Courtney Coker	N.D. Tex.	September 14, 2026	November 20, 2026	49–41	–	–	–
***	Kyle Reardon	D. Alaska	September 14, 2026	–	–	–	–	–
***	Daniel Ballou	E.D. Ky.	September 14, 2026	–	–	–	–	–
***	Robert E. Long	M.D. Fla.	September 14, 2026	–	–	–	–	–
***	Peter M. Mansfield	E.D. La.	September 14, 2026	–	–	–	–	–
***	Jesus Osete	W.D. Mo.	September 14, 2026	–	–	–	–	–
**	Trevor Pemberton	N.D. Okla.	September 14, 2026	–	–	–	–	–
**	Zach West	E.D. Okla.	September 14, 2026	–	–	–	–	–
**	Samuel Adkisson	E.D. Tenn.	September 14, 2026	–	–	–	–	–
**	Philip Axt	D.N.D.	September 14, 2026	–	–	–	–	–
**	Bradford Kelley	E.D. La.	September 14, 2026	–	–	–	–	–
**	Philip Aubart	M.D.N.C.	November 9, 2026	–	–	–	–	–
**	Brian S. Meyers	E.D.N.C.	November 9, 2026	–	–	–	–	–
**	Joseph P. Falvey	N.D. Ind.	November 9, 2026	–	–	–	–	–
**	Eric J. Hamilton	D. Neb.	November 9, 2026	–	–	–	–	–
**	William Grayson Lambert	D.S.C.	November 16, 2026	–	–	–	–	–
**	James P. Sullivan	W.D. Tex.	November 16, 2026	–	–	–	–	–
**	T. Elliot Gaiser	N.D. Tex.	November 16, 2026	–	–	–	–	–

== United States Court of International Trade ==
=== First administration ===
#	Judge	Nomination date	Confirmation date	Confirmation vote	Began active service	Ended active service	Ended senior status
1	M. Miller Baker	June 18, 2018	August 1, 2019	voice vote	December 18, 2019	Incumbent	–
2	Timothy M. Reif	June 18, 2018	August 1, 2019	voice vote	August 8, 2019	Incumbent	–
3	Stephen Vaden	October 17, 2019	November 18, 2020	49–43	December 21, 2020	July 7, 2025	–

=== Second administration ===
#	Judge	Nomination date	Confirmation date	Confirmation vote	Began active service	Ended active service	Ended senior status
1	Kara Westercamp	March 2, 2026	July 21, 2026	50–48	August 10, 2026	Incumbent	–

== Specialty courts (Article I) ==
=== United States Court of Federal Claims ===
==== First administration ====
#	Judge	Nomination date	Confirmation date	Confirmation vote	Began active service	Ended active service	Ended senior status
1	Ryan T. Holte	September 28, 2017	June 10, 2019	60–35	July 11, 2019	Incumbent	–
2	Richard Hertling	May 7, 2018	June 10, 2019	69–27	June 12, 2019	Incumbent	–
3	David A. Tapp	March 5, 2019	November 5, 2019	85–8	November 19, 2019	Incumbent	–
4	Matthew H. Solomson	March 5, 2019	January 8, 2020	89–8	February 3, 2020	Incumbent	–
5	Eleni M. Roumel	June 24, 2019	January 8, 2020	51–47	February 24, 2020	Incumbent	–
6	Edward H. Meyers	November 19, 2019	September 22, 2020	66–27	October 20, 2020	Incumbent	–
7	Kathryn C. Davis	November 19, 2019 (Note: Initial nomination expired on January 3, 2020. Subsequently renominated on February 4, 2020.)	December 2, 2020	51–45	December 16, 2020	Incumbent	–
8	Stephen S. Schwartz	October 17, 2019 (Note: Previously nominated to the Court of Federal Claims on June 7, 2017, a nomination which expired on January 3, 2018. Renominated to a different seat on the same court on October 17, 2019. That nomination expired January 3, 2020. Subsequently renominated on January 9, 2020.)	December 8, 2020	49–47	December 22, 2020	Incumbent	–
9	Zachary Somers	September 8, 2020	December 17, 2020	52–43	December 22, 2020	Incumbent	–
10	Thompson M. Dietz	July 2, 2020	December 19, 2020	51–36	December 22, 2020	Incumbent	–

=== United States Tax Court ===
==== First administration ====
#	Judge	Nomination date	Confirmation date	Confirmation vote	Began active service	Ended active service	Ended senior status
1	Elizabeth A. Copeland	August 3, 2017 (Note: Originally nominated on May 4, 2015, by President Obama. That nomination expired on January 3, 2017. Renominated by President Trump to a different seat on the same court on August 3, 2017.)	August 28, 2018	voice vote	October 12, 2018	Incumbent	–
2	Patrick J. Urda	August 3, 2017	August 28, 2018	voice vote	September 27, 2018	Incumbent	–
3	Emin Toro	April 10, 2018	August 1, 2019	voice vote	October 18, 2019	Incumbent	–
4	Courtney Dunbar Jones	January 24, 2018	August 1, 2019	voice vote	August 9, 2019	Incumbent	–
5	Travis A. Greaves	August 28, 2018	February 27, 2020	85–3	March 9, 2020	Incumbent	–
6	Alina I. Marshall	November 19, 2019	August 13, 2020	voice vote	August 24, 2020	Incumbent	–
7	Christian N. Weiler	November 19, 2019	August 13, 2020	voice vote	September 9, 2020	Incumbent	–

==== Second administration ====
*** Denotes nomination awaiting final confirmation by the full Senate
** Denotes nomination pending before the Senate Finance Committee
* Denotes nomination that has been announced but not yet submitted to the Senate

#	Judge	Nomination date	Confirmation date	Confirmation vote	Began active service	Ended active service	Ended senior status
***	Andrew A. De Mello	July 13, 2026	–	–	–	–	–

=== United States Court of Appeals for Veterans Claims ===
==== First administration ====
#	Judge	Nomination date	Confirmation date	Confirmation vote	Began active service	Ended active service	Ended senior status
1	Michael P. Allen	June 7, 2017	August 3, 2017	voice vote	August 9, 2017	Incumbent	–
2	Amanda L. Meredith	June 7, 2017	August 3, 2017	voice vote	August 9, 2017	Incumbent	–
3	Joseph L. Toth	June 7, 2017	August 3, 2017	voice vote	August 9, 2017	Incumbent	–
4	Joseph L. Falvey Jr.	January 24, 2018	April 26, 2018	voice vote	May 14, 2018	Incumbent	–
5	Grant C. Jaquith	September 19, 2019	July 23, 2020	voice vote	September 1, 2020	Incumbent	–
6	Scott J. Laurer	September 19, 2019	July 23, 2020	voice vote	August 2020	Incumbent	–

==== Second administration ====
*** Denotes nomination awaiting final confirmation by the full Senate
** Denotes nomination pending before the Senate Veterans' Affairs Committee
* Denotes nomination that has been announced but not yet submitted to the Senate

#	Judge	Nomination date	Confirmation date	Confirmation vote	Began active service	Ended active service	Ended senior status
***	David M. Jones	July 14, 2026	–	–	–	–	–
***	Daniel F. Rendleman	July 14, 2026	–	–	–	–	–
***	Robert R. Fleck	July 14, 2026	–	–	–	–	–
***	James Lewis Quinn	September 14, 2026	–	–	–	–	–

=== United States Court of Appeals for the Armed Forces ===
==== First administration ====
#	Judge	Nomination date	Confirmation date	Confirmation vote	Began active service	Ended active service	Ended senior status
1	Gregory E. Maggs	October 2, 2017	January 29, 2018	voice vote	February 2, 2018	Incumbent	–
2	Liam P. Hardy	May 21, 2020	December 3, 2020	59–34	December 8, 2020	Incumbent	–

=== United States Court of Military Commission Review ===
==== First administration ====
#	Judge	Nomination date	Confirmation date	Confirmation vote	Began active service	Ended active service
1	Frank D. Hutchison	August 28, 2018	October 11, 2018	voice vote	November 2, 2018	2019
2	Marcus N. Fulton	August 28, 2018	October 11, 2018	voice vote	November 2, 2018	2019
3	Lisa M. Schenck	August 28, 2018	August 1, 2019	voice vote	August 16, 2019	Incumbent
4	Jan E. Aldykiewicz	March 6, 2019	March 28, 2019	voice vote	May 20, 2019	2022
5	Michael A. Lewis	March 6, 2019	March 28, 2019	voice vote	May 20, 2019	2022
6	Tom Posch	March 6, 2019	March 28, 2019	voice vote	May 20, 2019	2023
7	Angela Tang	March 6, 2019	March 28, 2019	voice vote	May 20, 2019	2021
8	Paula Schasberger	March 6, 2019	March 28, 2019	voice vote	May 22, 2019	2021
9	James E. Key III	August 6, 2020	September 30, 2020	voice vote	March 29, 2021	2023
10	John J. Stephens	August 6, 2020	September 30, 2020	voice vote	June 10, 2021	2023

Julie Huygen (2019) and Luis O. Rodriguez (2020) were also confirmed by the Senate as judges of USCMCR, but did apparently not assume their positions.

==== Second administration ====
#	Judge	Nomination date	Confirmation date	Confirmation vote	Began active service	Ended active service
1	Peter G. Juetten	September 2, 2025	September 19, 2025	voice vote	November 25, 2025	Incumbent
2	Robert E. Murdough	September 2, 2025	September 19, 2025	voice vote	November 25, 2025	2026
3	Brian D. Korn	September 2, 2025	September 19, 2025	voice vote	December 1, 2025	Incumbent
4	Keaton H. Harrell	September 2, 2025	September 19, 2025	voice vote	December 1, 2025	Incumbent
5	Sara R. De Groot	September 2, 2025	September 19, 2025	voice vote	December 3, 2025	Incumbent
6	Christopher S. Morgan	September 2, 2025	September 19, 2025	voice vote	December 8, 2025	Incumbent
7	Kristin K. B. McCall	September 2, 2025	September 19, 2025	voice vote	December 8, 2025	Incumbent
8	Dayle P. Percle	September 2, 2025	September 19, 2025	voice vote	December 8, 2025	2026

== Territorial courts (Article IV) ==
=== First administration ===
#	Judge	Court	Nomination date	Confirmation date	Confirmation vote	Began active service	Ended active service	Ended senior status
1	Robert A. Molloy	D.V.I.	June 12, 2019	February 25, 2020	97–0	April 27, 2020	Incumbent	–

=== Second administration ===
#	Judge	Court	Nomination date	Confirmation date	Confirmation vote	Began active service	Ended active service	Ended senior status
1	Evan Rikhye	D.V.I.	March 2, 2026	May 20, 2026	52–47	May 28, 2026	Incumbent	–

== See also ==
- Donald Trump judicial appointment controversies
- Donald Trump Supreme Court candidates
- Federal Judicial Center
- Judicial appointment history for United States federal courts
- List of presidents of the United States by judicial appointments
- List of United States attorneys appointed by Donald Trump
- ABA ratings during the Trump administration
- Ratings of Article III and Article IV Judicial Nominees
- 115th Congress (2017–2018)
- 116th Congress (2019–2020)
- 119th Congress (2025–2026)

== Notes ==
Courts

Renominations

Confirmation votes
Article III

Supreme Court

Votes

Courts of appeals

District courts

International Trade

Article I

Court of Federal Claims

Tax Court

Court of Appeals for Veterans Claims

Court of Appeals for the Armed Forces

Court of Military Commission Review

Article IV
