= Greenville Township =

Greenville Township may refer to the following townships in the United States:

- Greenville Township, Bureau County, Illinois
- Greenville Township, Floyd County, Indiana
- Greenville Township, New Jersey
- Greenville Township, LaMoure County, North Dakota
- Greenville Township, Darke County, Ohio
- Greenville Township, Somerset County, Pennsylvania
