= Myron H. Bright =

American judge (1919–2016)

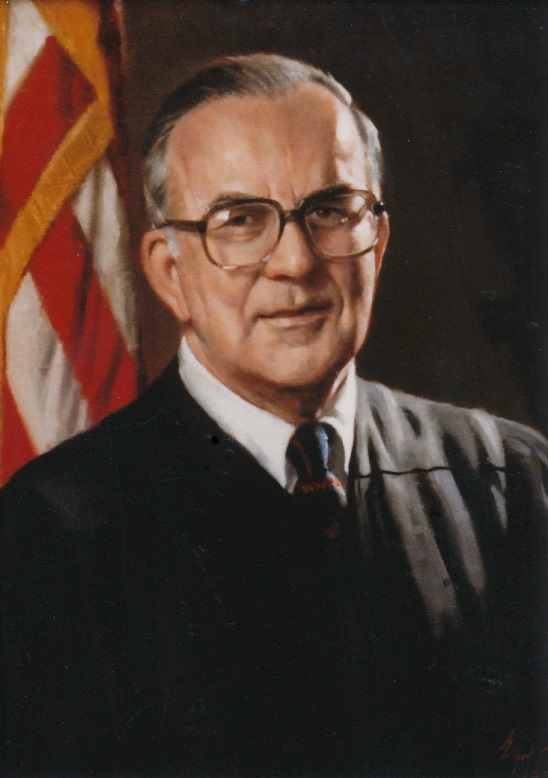

Senior Judge of the United States Court of Appeals for the Eighth Circuit
- In office June 1, 1985 – December 12, 2016

Judge of the United States Court of Appeals for the Eighth Circuit
- In office June 7, 1968 – June 1, 1985
- Appointed by: Lyndon B. Johnson
- Preceded by: Charles Joseph Vogel
- Succeeded by: Frank J. Magill

Personal details
- Born: Myron Howard Bright; March 5, 1919 Eveleth, Minnesota, U.S.
- Died: December 12, 2016 (aged 97) Fargo, North Dakota, U.S.
- Education: Eveleth Junior College (AA); University of Minnesota (BSL, LLB)

Military service
- Branch/service: United States Air Force
- Years of service: 1942–1946
- Rank: Captain

Myron Howard Bright (March 5, 1919 – December 12, 2016) was an American lawyer and jurist who served as a United States circuit judge of the United States Court of Appeals for the Eighth Circuit.

== Early life and education ==
Born in Eveleth, Minnesota, Bright graduated from Eveleth High School. He received an Associate of Arts degree from Eveleth Junior College (now Mesabi Range College) in 1939. He received a Bachelor of Science in Law from the University of Minnesota and a Bachelor of Laws from University of Minnesota Law School in 1947.

== Career ==
Bright served as a United States Air Force captain from 1942 to 1946. He later worked in private practice of law in Fargo, North Dakota from 1947 to 1968.

== Federal judicial service ==
Bright was nominated by President Lyndon B. Johnson on April 25, 1968, to a seat on the United States Court of Appeals for the Eighth Circuit vacated by Judge Charles Joseph Vogel. He was confirmed by the United States Senate on June 6, 1968, and received his commission the next day. He assumed senior status on June 1, 1985, and remained in post until his death in Fargo on December 12, 2016, at the age of 97.

== See also ==
- List of United States federal judges by longevity of service

== Sources ==
Legal offices
Preceded by Charles Joseph Vogel	Judge of the United States Court of Appeals for the Eighth Circuit; 1968–1985	Succeeded by Frank J. Magill
