= Attorney General Benson =

Attorney General Benson may refer to:

- Egbert Benson (1746–1833), Attorney General of New York
- Henry N. Benson (1872–1960), Attorney General of Minnesota
- Paul Benson (judge) (1918–2004), Attorney General of North Dakota
