= Brian C. Lea =

American judge (born 1983)

Brian Charles Lea
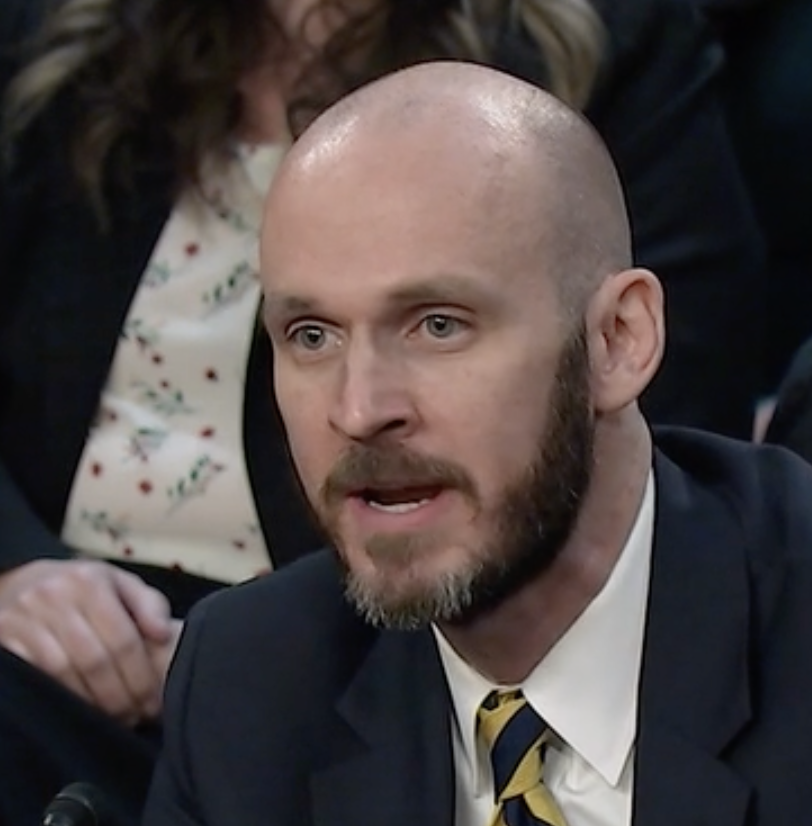

Judge of the United States District Court for the Western District of Tennessee
- Incumbent
- Assumed office March 2, 2026
- Appointed by: Donald Trump
- Preceded by: John T. Fowlkes Jr.

Personal details
- Born: 1983 (age 42–43) Montreal, Quebec, Canada
- Education: Union University (BA); University of Georgia (JD)

Brian Charles Lea (born 1983) is an Canadian-American lawyer who has served as a United States district judge of the United States District Court for the Western District of Tennessee since 2026. He previously served as a deputy associate attorney general for the United States Department of Justice from 2025 to 2026.

== Early life and education ==
Lea was born in Montreal, Canada in 1983. He received a Bachelor of Arts degree from Union University in 2006. He received a Juris Doctor from the University of Georgia School of Law in 2009, graduating Order of the Coif. He served as a law clerk for Judge Edward Earl Carnes of the United States Court of Appeals for the Eleventh Circuit from 2009 to 2010 and for Justice Clarence Thomas of the Supreme Court of the United States from 2011 to 2012.

== Career ==
After clerking, Lea was a partner at Jones Day at their Atlanta office, where he focused on product liability law, constitutional law, and appeals. Lea served as a deputy associate attorney general for the United States Department of Justice from 2025 to 2026.

=== Federal judicial service ===
On November 14, 2025, President Donald Trump announced his intention to nominate Lea to a seat on the United States District Court for the Western District of Tennessee vacated by Judge John T. Fowlkes Jr. On December 17, 2025, the U.S. Senate Judiciary Committee held a hearing on his nomination. On January 15, 2026 the committee advanced his nomination on a 12–10 vote. On February 4, the Senate voted to invoke cloture on his nomination by a 50–47 vote. The following day, his nomination was confirmed by a 50–46 vote. He received his judicial commission on March 2, 2026.

Legal offices
Preceded by John T. Fowlkes Jr.	Judge of the United States District Court for the Western District of Tennessee; 2026–present	Incumbent
