= Alfred Delavan Thomas =

American judge

Judge of the United States District Court for the District of North Dakota
- In office February 25, 1890 – August 8, 1896
- Appointed by: Benjamin Harrison
- Preceded by: Seat established by 25 Stat. 676
- Succeeded by: Charles F. Amidon

Personal details
- Born: Alfred Delavan Thomas; August 11, 1837 Delavan, Wisconsin Territory, U.S.
- Died: August 8, 1896 (aged 58) Fargo, North Dakota, U.S.
- Education: Brown University read law

Alfred Delavan Thomas (August 11, 1837 – August 8, 1896) was a United States district judge of the United States District Court for the District of North Dakota.

== Education and career ==
Born in Delavan, Walworth County, Wisconsin Territory (now Wisconsin), Thomas read law and graduated from Brown University in 1861. He was district attorney of Walworth County from about 1861 to 1867, and had a private practice in Delavan from 1864 to 1877, and in Fargo, Dakota Territory beginning in 1878. He was attorney for the Homestake Mining Company of Deadwood, Dakota Territory (now South Dakota) until 1882, returning to private practice in Fargo, Dakota Territory (State of North Dakota from November 2, 1889) from 1882 to 1890.

== Federal judicial service ==
On February 19, 1890, Thomas was nominated by President Benjamin Harrison to a new seat on the United States District Court for the District of North Dakota created by 25 Stat. 676. He was confirmed by the United States Senate on February 25, 1890, and received his commission the same day. He served in that capacity until his death on August 8, 1896, in Fargo.

== Sources ==
Legal offices
Preceded by Seat established by 25 Stat. 676	Judge of the United States District Court for the District of North Dakota; 1890–1896	Succeeded by Charles F. Amidon
