= Bruce Van Sickle =

American judge

Senior Judge of the United States District Court for the District of North Dakota
- In office February 28, 1985 – April 21, 2007

Judge of the United States District Court for the District of North Dakota
- In office December 15, 1971 – February 28, 1985
- Appointed by: Richard Nixon
- Preceded by: George Scott Register
- Succeeded by: Patrick Anthony Conmy

Personal details
- Born: Bruce Marion Van Sickle; February 13, 1917 Minot, North Dakota, U.S.
- Died: April 21, 2007 (aged 90) Bismarck, North Dakota, U.S.
- Party: Republican
- Education: University of Minnesota (B.S.L.); University of Minnesota Law School (J.D.)

Bruce Marion Van Sickle (February 13, 1917 – April 21, 2007) was a United States district judge of the United States District Court for the District of North Dakota.

== Education and career ==
Born in Minot, North Dakota, Van Sickle received a Bachelor of Science in Law degree from University of Minnesota in 1939. He received a Juris Doctor from University of Minnesota Law School in 1941. He was a United States Marine Corps Captain from 1941 to 1945. He was an adjudicator for the United States Veterans Administration in Seattle, Washington in 1946. He was a Title Attorney of the Bonneville Power Administration in Portland, Oregon from 1946 to 1947. He was in private practice of law in Minot from 1947 to 1971. He was a Member of the North Dakota House of Representatives from 1957 to 1959.

== Federal judicial service ==
Van Sickle was nominated by President Richard Nixon on December 10, 1971, to a seat on the United States District Court for the District of North Dakota vacated by Judge George Scott Register. He was confirmed by the United States Senate on December 11, 1971, and received his commission on December 15, 1971. He assumed senior status on February 28, 1985, and took inactive senior status on February 1, 2002. His service was terminated on April 21, 2007, due to his death in Bismarck, North Dakota.

== Honor ==
The federal courthouse in Minot was named in his honor in 2002.

== Sources ==
Legal offices
Preceded by George Scott Register	Judge of the United States District Court for the District of North Dakota; 1971–1985	Succeeded by Patrick Anthony Conmy
