= Charles F. Amidon =

American judge

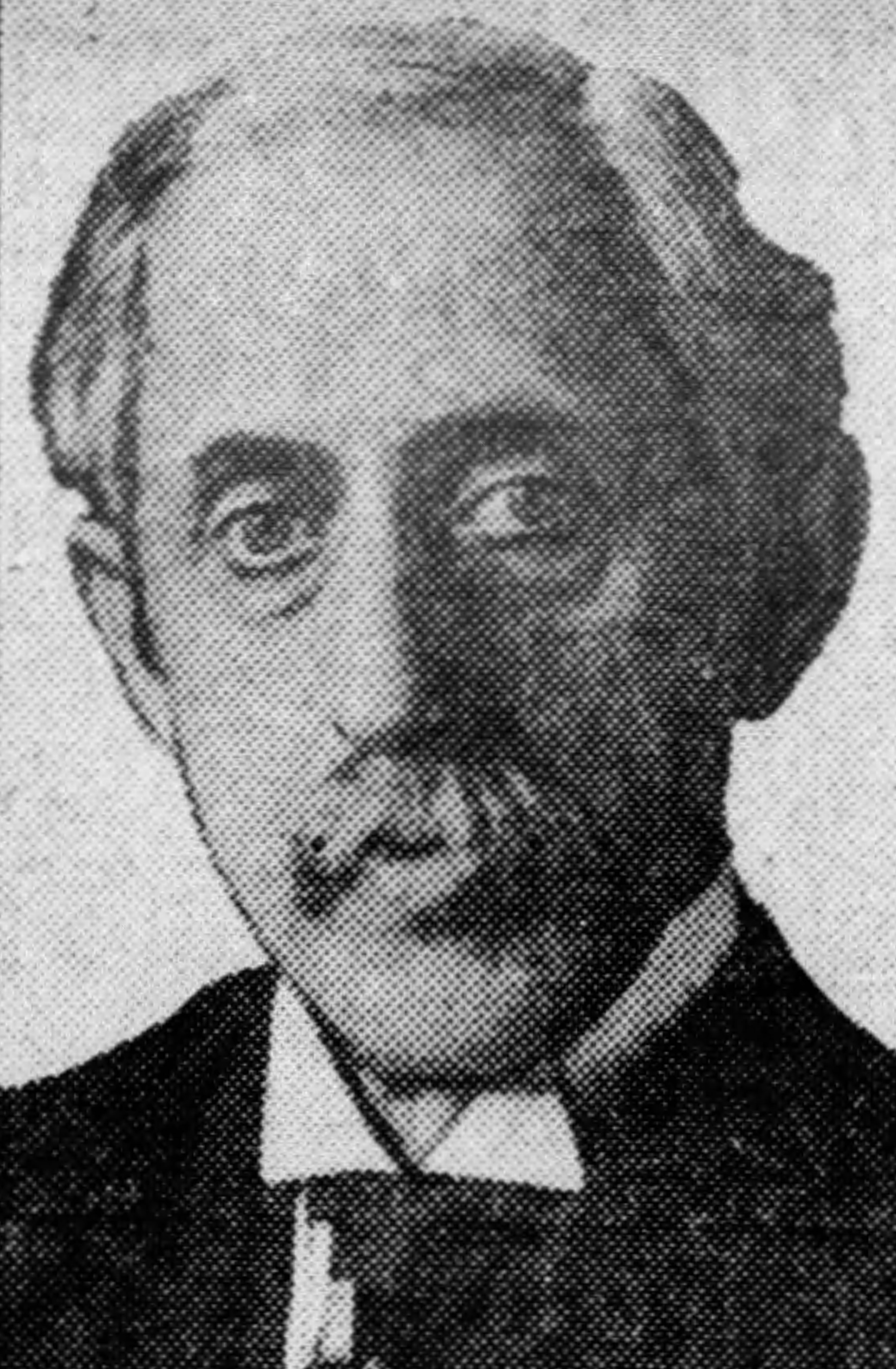

Senior Judge of the United States District Court for the District of North Dakota
- In office June 2, 1928 – December 26, 1937

Judge of the United States District Court for the District of North Dakota
- In office August 31, 1896 – June 2, 1928
- Appointed by: Grover Cleveland
- Preceded by: Alfred Delavan Thomas
- Succeeded by: Seat abolished

Personal details
- Born: Charles Fremont Amidon; August 17, 1856 Clymer, New York, U.S.
- Died: December 26, 1937 (aged 81) Tucson, Arizona, U.S.
- Education: Hamilton College (A.B.) read law

Charles Fremont Amidon (August 17, 1856 – December 26, 1937), frequently known as C. F. Amidon, was a United States district judge of the United States District Court for the District of North Dakota.

== Education and career ==
Born in Clymer, New York, Amidon received an Artium Baccalaureus degree from Hamilton College in 1882 and read law to enter the bar in 1886. He was in private practice in Fargo, Dakota Territory (State of North Dakota from November 2, 1889) from 1887 to 1890, and was city attorney of Fargo from 1890 to 1894, returning to private practice from 1894 to 1896. He was a Code Commissioner for the commission to Revise Codes of North Dakota from 1893 to 1895.

== Federal judicial service ==
Amidon received a recess appointment from President Grover Cleveland on August 31, 1896, to a seat on the United States District Court for the District of North Dakota vacated by Judge Alfred Delavan Thomas. He was nominated to the same position by President Cleveland on December 8, 1896. He was confirmed by the United States Senate on February 18, 1897, and received his commission the same day. He assumed senior status on June 2, 1928. His service terminated on December 26, 1937, due to his death in Tucson, Arizona. He was the last federal judge in active service to have been appointed by President Cleveland, and the longest-serving.

== See also ==
- List of United States federal judges by longevity of service

== Sources ==
Legal offices
Preceded by Alfred Delavan Thomas	Judge of the United States District Court for the District of North Dakota; 1896–1928	Succeeded by Seat abolished
