= Walter Garrett Riddick =

American judge (1883–1953)

Judge of the United States Court of Appeals for the Eighth Circuit
- In office December 19, 1941 – July 31, 1953
- Appointed by: Franklin D. Roosevelt
- Preceded by: Seat established by 54 Stat. 219
- Succeeded by: Charles Joseph Vogel

Personal details
- Born: Walter Garrett Riddick; September 13, 1883 Gainesville, Arkansas, U.S.
- Died: July 31, 1953 (aged 69)
- Education: Washington and Lee University; University of Arkansas School of Law (LLB)

Walter Garrett Riddick (September 13, 1883 – July 31, 1953) was a United States circuit judge of the United States Court of Appeals for the Eighth Circuit.

== Education and career ==
Born in Gainesville, Arkansas, Riddick attended Washington and Lee University and received a Bachelor of Laws from the University of Arkansas School of Law in 1908. He was an attorney for the Missouri Pacific Railroad from 1908 to 1913. He was in private practice in Little Rock, Arkansas from 1913 to 1942.

== Federal judicial service ==
Riddick was nominated by President Franklin D. Roosevelt on December 1, 1941, to the United States Court of Appeals for the Eighth Circuit, to a new seat created by 54 Stat. 219. He was confirmed by the United States Senate on December 16, 1941, and received his commission on December 19, 1941. Riddick served in that capacity until his death on July 31, 1953.

== Sources ==
Legal offices
Preceded by Seat established by 54 Stat. 219	Judge of the United States Court of Appeals for the Eighth Circuit; 1941–1953	Succeeded by Charles Joseph Vogel
