= George Scott Register =

American judge

Senior Judge of the United States District Court for the District of North Dakota
- In office December 22, 1971 – March 18, 1972

Chief Judge of the United States District Court for the District of North Dakota
- In office 1955–1971
- Preceded by: Charles Joseph Vogel
- Succeeded by: Paul Benson

Judge of the United States District Court for the District of North Dakota
- In office July 27, 1955 – December 22, 1971
- Appointed by: Dwight D. Eisenhower
- Preceded by: Seat established by 68 Stat. 8
- Succeeded by: Bruce Van Sickle

Personal details
- Born: George Scott Register; November 27, 1901 Bismarck, North Dakota, U.S.
- Died: March 18, 1972 (aged 70) Bismarck, North Dakota, U.S.
- Education: Jamestown College (A.B.); University of Michigan Law School (J.D.)

George Scott Register (November 27, 1901 – March 18, 1972) was a United States district judge of the United States District Court for the District of North Dakota.

== Education and career ==
Born in Bismarck, North Dakota, Register received an Artium Baccalaureus degree from Jamestown College in 1923 and a Juris Doctor from the University of Michigan Law School in 1926. He was a special assistant state attorney general of North Dakota from 1928 to 1929, and then a state's attorney of Burleigh County, North Dakota from 1929 to 1953. He was in private practice in Bismarck from 1953 to 1955.

== Federal judicial service ==
On June 21, 1955, Register was nominated by President Dwight D. Eisenhower to a new seat on the United States District Court for the District of North Dakota created by 68 Stat. 8. He was confirmed by the United States Senate on July 22, 1955, and received his commission on July 27, 1955. He served as Chief Judge from 1955 to 1971, assuming senior status on December 22, 1971. Register served in that capacity until his death in Bismarck on March 18, 1972.

== Sources ==
Legal offices
Preceded by Seat established by 68 Stat. 8	Judge of the United States District Court for the District of North Dakota; 1955–1971	Succeeded by Bruce Van Sickle
Preceded by Charles Joseph Vogel	Chief Judge of the United States District Court for the District of North Dakota; 1955–1971	Succeeded by Paul Benson
