= Michael C. Martin =

American judge (born 1974)

Michael Craig Martin
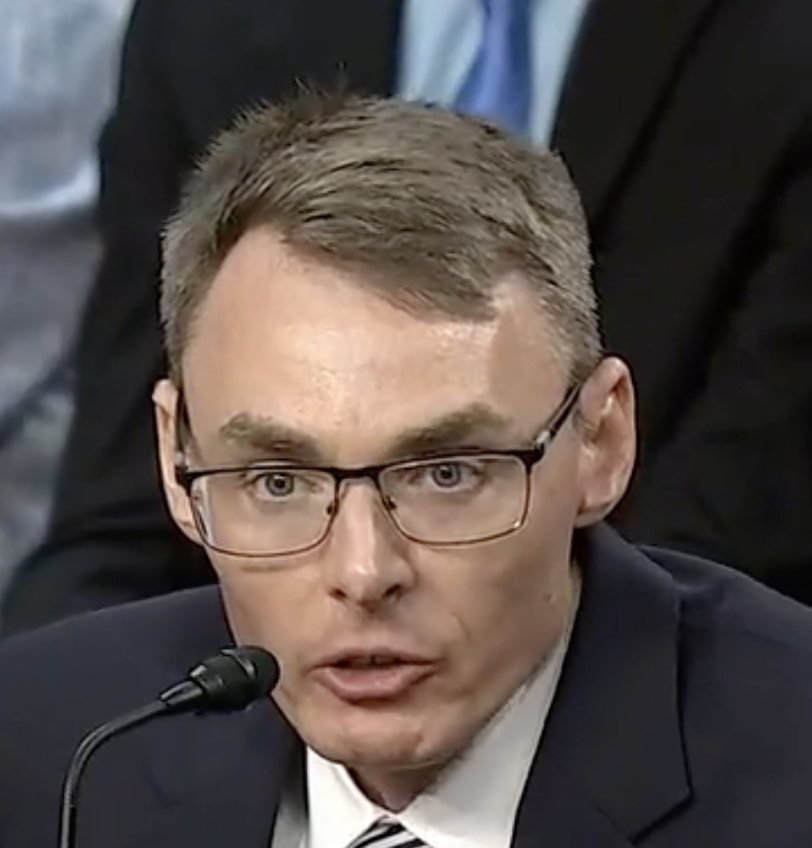

Judge of the United States District Court for the Eastern District of Michigan
- Incumbent
- Assumed office July 29, 2026
- Appointed by: Donald Trump
- Preceded by: Sean Cox

Personal details
- Born: Michael Craig Martin; 1974 (age 51–52) Cincinnati, Ohio, U.S.
- Education: Miami University (BA); Georgetown University (MA); Boston College (JD)

Michael Craig Martin (born 1974) (known professionally as Michael Martin) is an American lawyer and jurist serving as a United States district judge of the United States District Court for the Eastern District of Michigan since 2026. From 2008 to 2026, he was an assistant United States attorney in the same district.

== Education ==
Martin was born in 1974 in Cincinnati, Ohio. He received a Bachelor of Arts degree in 1995 from Miami University (of Ohio), a Master of Arts degree in 1997 from Georgetown University and a Juris Doctor, magna cum laude, in 2002 from Boston College Law School. From 2002 to 2003, he served as a law clerk for Judge Hugh H. Bownes of the United States Court of Appeals for the First Circuit and from 2003 to 2004, he served as a law clerk for Judge Edward F. Harrington of the United States District Court for the District of Massachusetts.

== Career ==
Martin was an associate at the law firm of Foley Hoag LLP in 2005. From 2005 to 2008, he served as a trial attorney in the United States Department of Justice counterespionage section. Martin has served as an assistant United States attorney from 2008 to 2026; serving as criminal chief in the Eastern District of Michigan from 2025 to 2026. He served in the Eastern District of Michigan in various roles including as deputy criminal chief from 2017 to 2019, as chief of the National Security Unit from 2019 to 2025, also serving as executive assistant United States attorney from 2020 to 2021.

=== Federal judicial service ===
On May 11, 2026, President Donald Trump announced his intention to nominate Martin to an undesignated seat on the United States District Court for the Eastern District of Michigan. On May 12, 2026, Trump nominated Martin to the seat on the Eastern District of Michigan vacated by Judge Sean Cox. On July 16, 2026, his nomination was reported to the Senate by a 14–7 vote. On July 22, 2026, the Senate invoked cloture on his nomination by a 60–35 vote. On the same day, his nomination was confirmed by a 62–36 vote. He received his judicial commission on July 29, 2026.

Legal offices
| Preceded by Sean Cox | Judge of the United States District Court for the Eastern District of Michigan; 2026–present | Incumbent |
