= United States District Court for the District of North Dakota =

United States federal district court of North Dakota

Coordinates: 46°48′32″N 100°47′18″W

- (D.N.D.)
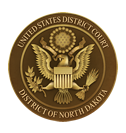

- Location: Bismarck More locations: Fargo; Bruce M. Van Sickle Federal Building and U.S. Courthouse (Minot); Grand Forks
- Appeals to: Eighth Circuit
- Established: November 2, 1889
- Judges: 2
- Chief Judge: Peter D. Welte

Officers of the court
- U.S. Attorney: Nicholas W. Chase
- U.S. Marshal: Dallas L. Carlson
- www.ndd.uscourts.gov

The United States District Court for the District of North Dakota (in case citations, D.N.D.) is the United States District Court or the Federal district court, whose jurisdiction is the state of North Dakota. The court is headquartered out of Bismarck at the William L. Guy Federal Building and has additional locations at Fargo, Grand Forks, and Minot. Appeals from the Court are heard by the United States Court of Appeals for the Eighth Circuit (except for patent claims and claims against the U.S. government under the Tucker Act, which are appealed to the Federal Circuit).

The district was created in 1889, when the Dakota Territory was divided into North Dakota and South Dakota. The Grand Forks courts are located at the Ronald N. Davies Federal Building and U.S. Courthouse. In 1921, a second temporary judgeship was authorized, however, this was never made permanent and the judgeship expired in 1928. In 1954, a second permanent judgeship was authorized, and the strength of the court has remained unchanged since.

The United States Attorney's Office for the District of North Dakota represents the United States in civil and criminal litigation in the court. As of October 10, 2025, the United States attorney for the District of North Dakota is Nicholas W. Chase.

== Current judges ==
As of October 8, 2026:

#	Title	Judge	Duty station	Born	Term of service			Appointed by
#	Title	Judge	Duty station	Born	Active	Chief	Senior	Appointed by
13	Chief Judge	Peter D. Welte	Fargo	1965	2019–present	2019–present	—	Trump
15	District Judge	vacant	—	—	—	—	—	—
11	Senior Judge	Daniel L. Hovland	Bismarck	1954	2002–2019	2002–2009; 2016–2019	2019–present	G.W. Bush

== Vacancies and pending nominations ==
Seat	Prior Judge's Duty Station	Seat last held by	Vacancy reason	Date of vacancy	Nominee	Date of nomination
3	Bismarck	Daniel M. Traynor	Elevation	July 28, 2026	Philip Axt	September 14, 2026

== Former judges ==
#	Judge	Born–died	Active service	Chief Judge	Senior status	Appointed by	Reason for termination
1	Alfred Delavan Thomas	1837–1896	1890–1896	—	—	B. Harrison	death
2	Charles Fremont Amidon	1856–1937	1896–1928 (Note: Recess appointment; formally nominated on December 8, 1896, confirmed by the United States Senate on February 18, 1897, and received commission the same day.)	—	1928–1937	Cleveland	death
3	Andrew Miller	1870–1960	1922–1941	—	1941–1960	Harding	death
4	Charles Joseph Vogel	1898–1980	1941–1954	1954	—	F. Roosevelt	elevation
5	Ronald Davies	1904–1996	1955–1971	—	1971–1996	Eisenhower	death
6	George Scott Register	1901–1972	1955–1971	1955–1971	1971–1972	Eisenhower	death
7	Paul Benson	1918–2004	1971–1985	1971–1985	1985–2004	Nixon	death
8	Bruce Van Sickle	1917–2007	1971–1985	—	1985–2007	Nixon	death
9	Patrick Anthony Conmy	1934–2026	1985–2000	1985–1992	2000–2026	Reagan	death
10	Rodney Scott Webb	1935–2009	1987–2001	1993–2001	2001–2009	Reagan	death
12	Ralph R. Erickson	1959–present	2003–2017	2009–2016	—	G.W. Bush	elevation
14	Daniel M. Traynor	1970–present	2020–2026	—	—	Trump	elevation

== Chief judges ==
Chief judges have administrative responsibilities with respect to their district court. Unlike the Supreme Court, where one justice is specifically nominated to be chief, the office of chief judge rotates among the district court judges. To be chief, a judge must have been in active service on the court for at least one year, be under the age of 65, and have not previously served as chief judge.

A vacancy is filled by the judge highest in seniority among the group of qualified judges. The chief judge serves for a term of seven years, or until age 70, whichever occurs first. The age restrictions are waived if no members of the court would otherwise be qualified for the position.

When the office was created in 1948, the chief judge was the longest-serving judge who had not elected to retire, on what has since 1958 been known as senior status, or declined to serve as chief judge. After August 6, 1959, judges could not become or remain chief after turning 70 years old. The current rules have been in operation since October 1, 1982.

== Succession of seats ==
Seat 1
Seat established on November 2, 1889 by 25 Stat. 676
Thomas	1890–1896
Amidon	1897–1928
Seat abolished on June 2, 1928 (temporary judgeship expired)

Seat 2
Seat established on June 25, 1921 by 42 Stat. 66 (temporary)
Seat became permanent upon the abolition of Seat 1 on June 2, 1928
Miller	1922–1941
Vogel	1941–1954
Davies	1955–1971
Benson	1971–1985
Webb	1987–2001
Erickson	2003–2017
Welte	2019–present

Seat 3
Seat established on February 10, 1954 by 68 Stat. 8
Register	1955–1971
Van Sickle	1971–1985
Conmy	1985–2000
Hovland	2002–2019
Traynor	2020–2026
vacant	2026–present

== See also ==
- Courts of North Dakota
- List of current United States district judges
- List of United States federal courthouses in North Dakota
