= Paul Benson (judge) =

American judge

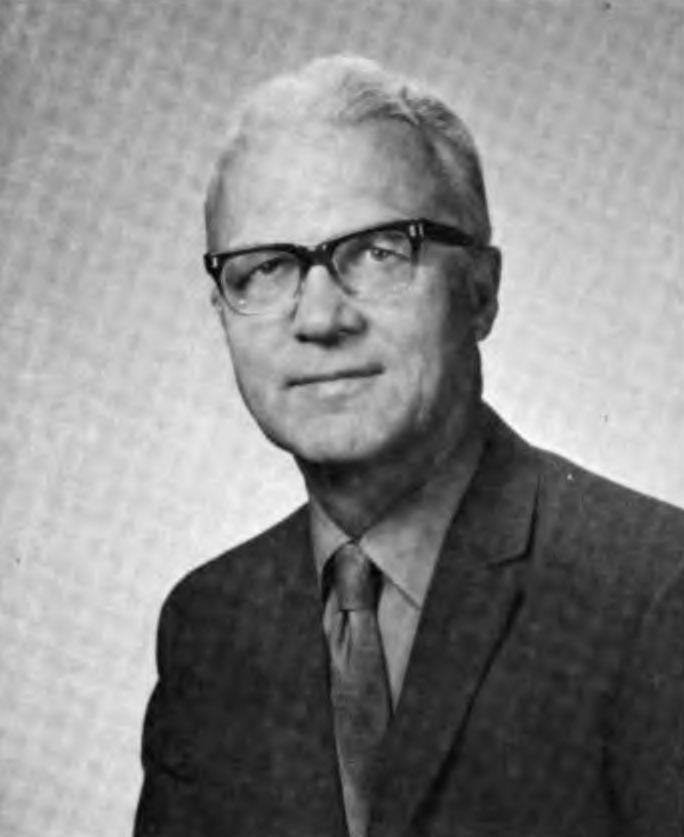

Senior Judge of the United States District Court for the District of North Dakota
- In office December 31, 1985 – April 22, 2004

Chief Judge of the United States District Court for the District of North Dakota
- In office 1971–1985
- Preceded by: George Scott Register
- Succeeded by: Patrick Anthony Conmy

Judge of the United States District Court for the District of North Dakota
- In office July 29, 1971 – December 31, 1985
- Appointed by: Richard Nixon
- Preceded by: Ronald Davies
- Succeeded by: Rodney Scott Webb

22nd Attorney General of North Dakota
- In office 1954–1955
- Governor: Norman Brunsdale
- Preceded by: Elmo T. Christianson
- Succeeded by: Leslie R. Burgum

Personal details
- Born: Paul Benson; June 1, 1918 Greenville Township, North Dakota, U.S.
- Died: April 22, 2004 (aged 85) Verona, Wisconsin, U.S.
- Education: University of North Dakota (B.S.); George Washington University Law School (LL.B.)

Paul Benson (June 1, 1918 – April 22, 2004) was a United States district judge of the United States District Court for the District of North Dakota.

== Education and career ==
Born in Greenville Township, LaMoure County, North Dakota, Benson received a Bachelor of Science degree from the University of North Dakota in 1942 and was a lieutenant in the United States Navy during World War II, from 1942 to 1946. He received a Bachelor of Laws from George Washington University Law School in 1949, entering private practice in Cavalier, North Dakota in 1949 and in Grand Forks, North Dakota from 1950 to 1971. He was an assistant city attorney of Grand Forks from 1952 to 1954. He was the North Dakota Attorney General from 1954 to 1955. He was a lecturer at the University of North Dakota School of Law from 1960 to 1965.

== Federal judicial service ==
On July 12, 1971, Benson was nominated by President Richard Nixon to a seat on the United States District Court for the District of North Dakota vacated by Judge Ronald Davies. Benson was confirmed by the United States Senate on July 29, 1971, and received his commission the same day. He served as Chief Judge from 1971 to 1985, assuming senior status on December 31, 1985. Benson served in that capacity until his death on April 22, 2004, in Verona, Wisconsin.

== Sources ==
Legal offices
Preceded by Ronald Davies	Judge of the United States District Court for the District of North Dakota; 1971–1985	Succeeded by Rodney Scott Webb
Preceded by George Scott Register	Chief Judge of the United States District Court for the District of North Dakota; 1971–1985	Succeeded by Patrick Anthony Conmy
