= Rodney Scott Webb =

American judge

Senior Judge of the United States District Court for the District of North Dakota
- In office December 31, 2001 – August 9, 2009

Chief Judge of the United States District Court for the District of North Dakota
- In office 1993–2001
- Preceded by: Patrick Anthony Conmy
- Succeeded by: Daniel L. Hovland

Judge of the United States District Court for the District of North Dakota
- In office December 21, 1987 – December 31, 2001
- Appointed by: Ronald Reagan
- Preceded by: Paul Benson
- Succeeded by: Ralph R. Erickson

Personal details
- Born: Rodney Scott Webb; June 21, 1935 Cavalier, North Dakota, U.S.
- Died: August 9, 2009 (aged 74) Fargo, North Dakota, U.S.
- Education: University of North Dakota (B.S.); University of North Dakota School of Law (J.D.)

Rodney Scott Webb (June 21, 1935 – August 9, 2009) was a United States district judge of the United States District Court for the District of North Dakota.

== Education and career ==
Born in Cavalier, North Dakota, Webb received a Bachelor of Science degree from the University of North Dakota in 1957. He received a Juris Doctor from University of North Dakota School of Law in 1959. He was in private practice of law in Grafton, North Dakota from 1959 to 1981. He was a Walsh County state attorney from 1967 to 1974. He was a special assistant attorney general for North Dakota from 1970 to 1981. He was a Grafton municipal judge from 1975 to 1981. He was the United States Attorney for the District of North Dakota from 1981 to 1987. Webb was a member of the United States Attorney General's Advisory Committee of United States Attorneys and member of the Indian Affairs Subcommittee. He retired from the North Dakota Army National Guard J.A.G. Corps with the rank of colonel.

== Federal judicial service ==
Webb was nominated by President Ronald Reagan on May 5, 1987, to a seat on the United States District Court for the District of North Dakota vacated by Judge Paul Benson. He was confirmed by the United States Senate on December 19, 1987, and received his commission on December 21, 1987. He served as Chief Judge from 1993 to 2001. He assumed senior status on December 31, 2001, serving in that status until his death.

== Family ==
His son, Wade, is a state district judge in Fargo, North Dakota. Wade Webb was sworn into office by his father in 2003.

== Death ==
Webb died in Fargo on Sunday, August 9, 2009, aged 74, from complications of cancer.

== Sources ==
Legal offices
Preceded by Paul Benson	Judge of the United States District Court for the District of North Dakota; 1987–2001	Succeeded by Ralph R. Erickson
Preceded by Patrick Anthony Conmy	Chief Judge of the United States District Court for the District of North Dakota; 1993–2001	Succeeded by Daniel L. Hovland
