= Patrick Anthony Conmy =

American judge (1934–2026)

Senior Judge of the United States District Court for the District of North Dakota
- In office January 5, 2000 – October 7, 2026

Chief Judge of the United States District Court for the District of North Dakota
- In office 1985–1992
- Preceded by: Paul Benson
- Succeeded by: Rodney Scott Webb

Judge of the United States District Court for the District of North Dakota
- In office December 17, 1985 – January 5, 2000
- Appointed by: Ronald Reagan
- Preceded by: Bruce Van Sickle
- Succeeded by: Daniel L. Hovland

Personal details
- Born: January 5, 1934 Fargo, North Dakota, U.S.
- Died: October 7, 2026 (aged 92)
- Education: Harvard College (BA); Georgetown University (JD)

Patrick Anthony Conmy (January 5, 1934 – October 7, 2026) was a United States district judge of the United States District Court for the District of North Dakota.

== Education and career ==
Conmy was born in Fargo, North Dakota on January 5, 1934. He received a Bachelor of Arts degree from Harvard College in 1955 and a Juris Doctor from Georgetown University Law Center in 1959. He was a junior management assistant for the United States Department of Labor in Washington, D.C., from 1955 to 1959. He was in private practice in Bismarck, North Dakota from 1959 to 1985, also serving as city commissioner for Bismarck from 1968 to 1976, and as a member of the North Dakota House of Representatives from 1976 to 1985.

=== Federal judicial service ===
On October 16, 1985, Conmy was nominated by President Ronald Reagan to a seat on the United States District Court for the District of North Dakota vacated by Judge Bruce Van Sickle. Conmy was confirmed by the United States Senate on December 16, 1985, and received his commission on December 17, 1985. He served as Chief Judge from 1985 to 1992, assumed senior status on January 5, 2000, and became inactive in 2014.

== Death ==
Conmy died on October 7, 2026, at the age of 92.

== Sources ==
Legal offices
| Preceded by Bruce Van Sickle | Judge of the United States District Court for the District of North Dakota; 1985–2000 | Succeeded by Daniel L. Hovland |
| Preceded by Paul Benson | Chief Judge of the United States District Court for the District of North Dakota; 1985–1992 | Succeeded by Rodney Scott Webb |
