= Daniel L. Hovland =

American judge (born 1954)

Daniel Lee Hovland

Senior Judge of the United States District Court for the District of North Dakota
- Incumbent
- Assumed office November 10, 2019

Chief Judge of the United States District Court for the District of North Dakota
- In office November 1, 2016 – November 10, 2019
- Preceded by: Ralph R. Erickson
- Succeeded by: Peter D. Welte
- In office 2002 – November 1, 2009
- Preceded by: Rodney Scott Webb
- Succeeded by: Ralph R. Erickson

Judge of the United States District Court for the District of North Dakota
- In office November 26, 2002 – November 10, 2019
- Appointed by: George W. Bush
- Preceded by: Patrick Anthony Conmy
- Succeeded by: Daniel M. Traynor

Personal details
- Born: Daniel Lee Hovland; November 10, 1954 (age 71) Moorhead, Minnesota, U.S.
- Education: Concordia College (BA); University of North Dakota (JD)

Daniel Lee Hovland (born November 10, 1954) is a senior United States district judge of the United States District Court for the District of North Dakota.

== Education and career ==
Hovland was born in Moorhead, Minnesota. He received a Bachelor of Arts degree from Concordia College in 1976 and a Juris Doctor from the University of North Dakota School of Law in 1979. He was a law clerk to Judge Ralph J. Erickstad of the North Dakota Supreme Court from 1979 to 1980. He was an assistant attorney general of Office of the Attorney General for the State of North Dakota from 1980 to 1983. He was in private practice in Bismarck, North Dakota, from 1983 to 2002. He was a Commissioner, Bismarck Park & Recreation District, North Dakota from 1992 to 2002. He was an administrative law judge in the Office of Administrative Hearings of North Dakota from 1994 to 2002.

=== Federal judicial service ===
Hovland was nominated by President George W. Bush on June 26, 2002, to a seat vacated by Judge Patrick Anthony Conmy. He was confirmed by the United States Senate on November 14, 2002, and received his commission on November 26, 2002. He served as chief judge from 2002 through 2009 and reassumed that role on November 1, 2016, until assuming senior status on November 10, 2019.

Legal offices
Preceded by Patrick Anthony Conmy	Judge of the United States District Court for the District of North Dakota; 2002–2019	Succeeded by Daniel M. Traynor
Preceded by Rodney Scott Webb	Chief Judge of the United States District Court for the District of North Dakota; 2002–2009	Succeeded by Ralph R. Erickson
Preceded by Ralph R. Erickson	Chief Judge of the United States District Court for the District of North Dakota; 2016–2019	Succeeded by Peter D. Welte
