= Charles Joseph Vogel =

American judge (1898–1980)

Senior Judge of the United States Court of Appeals for the Eighth Circuit
- In office February 20, 1968 – September 8, 1980

Chief Judge of the United States Court of Appeals for the Eighth Circuit
- In office 1965–1968
- Preceded by: Harvey M. Johnsen
- Succeeded by: Martin Donald Van Oosterhout

Judge of the United States Court of Appeals for the Eighth Circuit
- In office August 20, 1954 – February 20, 1968
- Appointed by: Dwight D. Eisenhower
- Preceded by: Walter Garrett Riddick
- Succeeded by: Myron H. Bright

Chief Judge of the United States District Court for the District of North Dakota
- In office 1954
- Preceded by: Office established
- Succeeded by: George Scott Register

Judge of the United States District Court for the District of North Dakota
- In office October 30, 1941 – August 20, 1954
- Appointed by: Franklin D. Roosevelt
- Preceded by: Andrew Miller
- Succeeded by: Ronald Davies

Personal details
- Born: Charles Joseph Vogel; September 20, 1898 Star Lake Township, Minnesota, U.S.
- Died: September 8, 1980 (aged 81)
- Education: University of Minnesota Law School (LLB)

Charles Joseph Vogel (September 20, 1898 – September 8, 1980) was a United States circuit judge of the United States Court of Appeals for the Eighth Circuit and previously was a United States district judge of the United States District Court for the District of North Dakota.

== Education and career ==
Born in Star Lake Township, Minnesota, Vogel was in the United States Army as a Sergeant from 1918 to 1919, and then received a Bachelor of Laws from the University of Minnesota Law School in 1923. He was in private practice in Minot, North Dakota from 1924 to 1925, and in Fargo, North Dakota from 1925 to 1941. He was a Referee in Bankruptcy for the United States District Court for the District of North Dakota in 1924, and was an unsuccessful Democratic candidate for United States Senate from North Dakota in 1940.

== Federal judicial service ==
Vogel was nominated by President Franklin D. Roosevelt on July 15, 1941, to a seat on the United States District Court for the District of North Dakota vacated by Judge Andrew Miller. He was confirmed by the United States Senate on October 27, 1941, and received his commission on October 30, 1941. He served as Chief Judge in 1954. His service was terminated on August 20, 1954, due to his elevation to the Eighth Circuit. As of 2025, Vogel is the last judge for the District of North Dakota to have been appointed by a Democratic president.

Vogel was nominated by President Dwight D. Eisenhower on August 16, 1954, to a seat on the United States Court of Appeals for the Eighth Circuit vacated by Judge Walter Garrett Riddick. He was confirmed by the Senate on August 18, 1954, and received his commission on August 20, 1954. He served as Chief Judge from 1965 to 1968 and as a member of the Judicial Conference of the United States from 1965 to 1967. He assumed senior status on February 20, 1968. His service was terminated on September 8, 1980, due to his death.

== Sources ==
Legal offices
Preceded by Andrew Miller	Judge of the United States District Court for the District of North Dakota; 1941–1954	Succeeded by Ronald Davies
Preceded by Office established	Chief Judge of the United States District Court for the District of North Dakota; 1954	Succeeded by George Scott Register
Preceded by Walter Garrett Riddick	Judge of the United States Court of Appeals for the Eighth Circuit; 1954–1968	Succeeded by Myron H. Bright
Preceded by Harvey M. Johnsen	Chief Judge of the United States Court of Appeals for the Eighth Circuit; 1965–1968	Succeeded by Martin Donald Van Oosterhout
