= Daniel M. Traynor =

American judge (born 1970)

Daniel Traynor

Judge of the United States Court of Appeals for the Eighth Circuit
- Incumbent
- Assumed office July 24, 2026
- Appointed by: Donald Trump
- Preceded by: Ralph R. Erickson

Judge of the United States District Court for the District of North Dakota
- In office January 13, 2020 – July 28, 2026
- Appointed by: Donald Trump
- Preceded by: Daniel L. Hovland
- Succeeded by: Vacant

Personal details
- Born: Daniel Mack Traynor; 1970 (age 55–56) Devils Lake, North Dakota, U.S.
- Party: Republican
- Education: University of North Dakota (BA, JD)

Daniel Mack Traynor (born 1970) is a United States circuit judge of the United States Court of Appeals for the Eighth Circuit.

== Education ==
Traynor earned his Bachelor of Arts from the University of North Dakota and his Juris Doctor, with distinction, from the University of North Dakota School of Law, where he served as an associate editor on the North Dakota Law Review.

== Legal career ==
Upon graduation from law school, Traynor served as a law clerk to Chief Justice Gerald W. VandeWalle of the North Dakota Supreme Court. From 1998 to 2019, he was a shareholder at the Traynor Law Firm in Devils Lake, North Dakota, where his practice focused on insurance defense, personal injury – branches of insurance law – and business litigation.

== Federal judicial service ==
=== District Court service ===
On August 28, 2019, President Donald Trump announced his intent to nominate Traynor to serve as a United States district judge for the United States District Court for the District of North Dakota. On September 19, 2019, his nomination was sent to the Senate. He was nominated to the seat vacated by Judge Daniel L. Hovland, who assumed senior status on November 10, 2019. Traynor was recommended for the district court by Senator Kevin Cramer, who announced his support for the nomination. On September 25, 2019, a hearing on his nomination was held before the Senate Judiciary Committee. On October 31, 2019, his nomination was reported out of committee by a 12–10 vote. On December 18, 2019, the United States Senate invoked cloture on his nomination by a 51–42 vote. On December 19, 2019, his nomination was confirmed by a 51–41 vote. He received his judicial commission on January 13, 2020. His service on the district court terminated on July 28, 2026, upon elevation to the court of appeals.

=== Court of Appeals service ===
On May 11, 2026, President Trump announced his intention to nominate Traynor to the United States Court of Appeals for the Eighth Circuit to an undesignated seat. On May 12, 2026, Trump nominated Traynor to the seat on the Eighth Circuit being vacated by Judge Ralph R. Erickson. On July 16, 2026 his nomination was reported to the full Senate by a 11–10 vote. On July 22, 2026, the Senate invoked cloture on his nomination by a 51–46 vote. On July 23, 2026, his nomination was confirmed by a 48–47 vote. He received his judicial commission on July 24, 2026.

=== Notable cases ===
Traynor dismissed Corner Post, Inc. v. Board of Governors of the Federal Reserve System in 2022, ruling that the suit was outside of the statute of limitations. In 2025, after the Supreme Court of the United States' ruling, Traynor ruled that the Federal Reserve "had acted outside the scope of its authority" under the Durbin amendment.

== Memberships ==
Traynor is a member of the North Dakota State Board of Higher Education and former chair of the Disciplinary Board of the North Dakota Supreme Court. He has been a member of the Federalist Society since 2016.

Legal offices
Preceded by Daniel L. Hovland	Judge of the United States District Court for the District of North Dakota; 2020–2026	Vacant
Preceded by Ralph R. Erickson	Judge of the United States Court of Appeals for the Eighth Circuit; 2026–present	Incumbent
