= Ronald Davies (judge) =

American judge (1904–1996)

Senior Judge of the United States District Court for the District of North Dakota
- In office August 27, 1971 – April 18, 1996

Judge of the United States District Court for the District of North Dakota
- In office July 27, 1955 – August 27, 1971
- Appointed by: Dwight D. Eisenhower
- Preceded by: Charles Joseph Vogel
- Succeeded by: Paul Benson

Personal details
- Born: Ronald Norwood Davies; December 11, 1904 Crookston, Minnesota, U.S.
- Died: April 18, 1996 (aged 91) Fargo, North Dakota, U.S.
- Education: University of North Dakota (A.B.); Georgetown Law (LL.B.)

Ronald Norwood Davies (December 11, 1904 – April 18, 1996) was a United States district judge of the United States District Court for the District of North Dakota. He is best known for his role in the Little Rock Integration Crisis in the fall of 1957. Davies ordered the desegregation of the previously all-white Little Rock Central High.

== Education and career ==
Davies was born on December 11, 1904, in Crookston in Polk County in northwestern Minnesota. In 1927, he received an Artium Baccalaureus degree from the College of Liberal Arts at the University of North Dakota at Grand Forks, North Dakota. In 1930, he received a Bachelor of Laws from Georgetown Law in Washington, D.C. He practiced law in Grand Forks from 1930 to 1932, before becoming a Judge of the Grand Forks Municipal Court from 1932 to 1940. In 1940, Davies and a fellow Grand Forks attorney, Charles F. Peterson, formed a private law practice. During World War II, Davies served in the United States Army from 1942 to 1946. After the war, Davies went back to his private practice from 1946 to 1955.

== Federal judicial service ==
On June 21, 1955, Davies was nominated by President Dwight D. Eisenhower to a seat on the United States District Court for the District of North Dakota, based in Fargo, vacated by Judge Charles Joseph Vogel. Davies was confirmed by the United States Senate on July 22, 1955, and received his commission on July 27, 1955. He assumed senior status on August 27, 1971. His service terminated on April 18, 1996, due to his death in Fargo.

=== Little Rock ===
Davies is perhaps best known for challenging Orval Faubus, the Governor of Arkansas, during the 1957 Little Rock Integration Crisis. On August 22, 1957, Judge Archibald K. Gardner of the United States Court of Appeals for the Eighth Circuit temporarily assigned Judge Davies to the United States District Court for the Eastern District of Arkansas in Little Rock, the state capital of Arkansas, where no judge had been sitting for several months.

Osro Cobb, the United States Attorney for the Eastern District of Arkansas, describes Davies, accordingly:

He was a comparatively new jurist and was full of energy, ready to tackle the large docket of cases that had accumulated during the many months when no judge was sitting at Little Rock. The condition of the docket was the reason for his assignment. I spent long hours briefing Judge Davies about the crowded docket because the government was a party to about 30 percent of the cases on it. The integration fight was boiling in the local media, but no motion or pleading relating to it was on file in the district court when Judge Davies began his duties in Little Rock. All such matters heard by him originated after his arrival in Little Rock in August 1957.

The Supreme Court of the United States issued its Brown v. Topeka Board of Education decision (347 U.S. 483) on May 17, 1954. The decision called for the desegregation of all public schools. In 1955, the court declared that the desegregation process must continue with "all deliberate speed". The Little Rock School Board unanimously decided to comply with the high court's ruling and agreed to a gradual desegregation plan, which would be implemented in the 1958 school year.

By 1957, the NAACP had registered nine black students to attend the all-white Little Rock Central High School. Meanwhile, the "Mother's League", a segregationist parents group, requested an injunction against the Little Rock School Board to prevent the nine students from attending the school. Segregationist parents also threatened to protest in front of the high school and physically block any black students from entering the school. Murray Reed, the chancellor of Pulaski County Chancery Court, granted the injunction on August 27, 1956, "on the grounds that integration could lead to violence." Judge Davies, however, nullified the injunction on August 30 and ordered the school board to proceed with integration on September 3.

Despite the federal court's ruling, Governor Faubus deployed the Arkansas National Guard to the school under the pretense of maintaining civil order. The nine black students attempted to enter Central High on September 4, 1957, but were turned away by the guardsmen. The deployment of the guardsmen brought international attention to Little Rock. President Eisenhower called Governor Faubus to his vacation home in Newport, Rhode Island on September 14, 1957, and warned him not to interfere with the Supreme Court's ruling.

Attorneys from the United States Department of Justice requested an injunction against the governor's deployment of the National Guard, which Judge Davies granted on September 20, 1957. Davies ruled that Faubus had used the troops to prevent integration, not to preserve law and order as claimed. Davies ordered the Governor to remove the guardsmen. The Governor backed down and withdrew the guardsmen during the weekend. Afterwards the Little Rock Police Department attempted to sneak the nine students into the school on Monday, September 23, 1957. However, the nine were escorted out when angry parents of white students inside begin confronting the outnumbered police.

The next day, the Mayor of Little Rock, Woodrow Wilson Mann, requested federal troops to enforce integration at Central High. President Eisenhower deployed the 101st Airborne Division to the school to escort the nine students and the division remained there for the remainder of the school year. The Mother's League petitioned Judge Davies to force the removal of the federal troops on October 17, 1957, but he dismissed the petition.

Osro Cobb recalls that "a deluge of vile and threatening cards and letters" addressed to Judge Davies arrived at the post office in Little Rock. According to Cobb,

Much of it never reached him, but he knew about the quantity and substance of the mail and showed me several letters that he had kept. Surprisingly, more than half of the threatening mail came from the Chicago area. Judge Davies was not frightened by the threats and calumny heaped on him, but he did agree to sensible protection measures. A deputy United States Marshal guarded him twenty-four hours a day, and no attempt was made on his life. One weekend, he had to return to North Dakota. No information was released on the trip, and it was planned with a minimum of exposure in Chicago....[There were] rumors about alleged astonishing increases in sales of firearms, knives, ammunition, and dynamite, and of threats of violence against key school personnel. There were reports of bombs being placed in the school itself. ... several bombings and attempted bombings [occurred] before the school crisis abated...

== Legacy ==
Davies is a recipient of the Rough Rider Award, the highest honor presented by the state of North Dakota in honor of Theodore Roosevelt. The Ronald N. Davies Federal Building and U.S. Courthouse in Grand Forks is named in his memory. In 2011, Fargo established the Judge Ronald N. Davies High School.

== Sources ==
- Time Magazine. "Trail Blazers on the Bench." Monday, December 5, 1960.
- Time Magazine. "I'm Just One of a Couple of Hundred". Monday, September 30, 1957.
- Warner, Colleen A. "From Fargo to Little Rock: Federal Judge Ronald N. Davies and the Public School Desegregation Crisis of 1957." Western Legal History. Volume 17, Number 1. Winter/Spring 2004. Pages 1–44.

Legal offices
| Preceded by Charles Joseph Vogel | Judge of the United States District Court for the District of North Dakota; 1955–1971 | Succeeded by Paul Benson |
