= Peter D. Welte =

American judge (born 1965)

Peter Welte
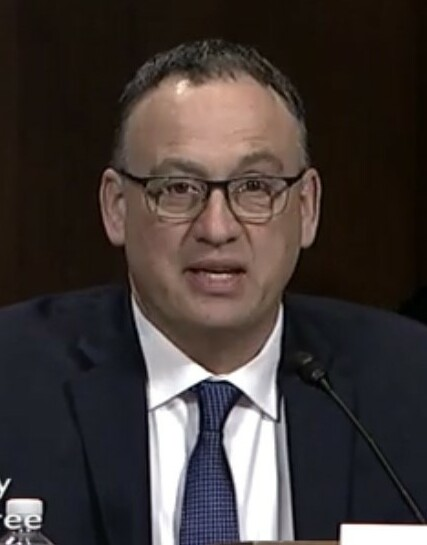

Chief Judge of the United States District Court for the District of North Dakota
- Incumbent
- Assumed office November 11, 2019
- Preceded by: Daniel L. Hovland

Judge of the United States District Court for the District of North Dakota
- Incumbent
- Assumed office August 5, 2019
- Appointed by: Donald Trump
- Preceded by: Ralph R. Erickson

Personal details
- Born: Peter David Welte; December 21, 1965 (age 60) New Britain, Connecticut, U.S.
- Education: North Dakota State University (BS); University of North Dakota (JD)

Peter David Welte (born December 21, 1965) is the chief United States district judge of the United States District Court for the District of North Dakota.

== Early life and education ==
Welte was born on December 21, 1965, in New Britain, Connecticut. He received his Bachelor of Science from North Dakota State University and his Juris Doctor, with distinction, from the University of North Dakota School of Law.

== Legal career ==
From 1999 to 2003 he served in the State's Attorney's office of Grand Forks County as a line prosecutor. He was later elected State's Attorney for the same office in 2003 and served in that capacity until 2015. From 2015 to 2019 he was a shareholder in the Vogel Law Firm, where his practice focused on criminal defense and agriculture law.

== Federal judicial service ==
On January 16, 2019, President Donald Trump announced his intent to nominate Welte to serve as a United States district judge for the United States District Court for the District of North Dakota. On January 17, 2019, his nomination was sent to the Senate. President Trump nominated Welte to the seat vacated by Judge Ralph R. Erickson, who was elevated to the United States Court of Appeals for the Eighth Circuit on October 12, 2017.

On February 13, 2019, a hearing on his nomination was held before the Senate Judiciary Committee. On March 7, 2019, Welte's nomination was reported out of committee by a 16–6 vote. On July 29, 2019, the United States Senate invoked cloture on his nomination by a 66–21 vote. On July 30, 2019, his nomination was confirmed by a 68–22 vote. He received his judicial commission on August 5, 2019. He has served as chief judge since November 11, 2019.

Legal offices
Preceded by Ralph R. Erickson	Judge of the United States District Court for the District of North Dakota; 2019–present	Incumbent
Preceded by Daniel L. Hovland	Chief Judge of the United States District Court for the District of North Dakota; 2019–present	Incumbent
