= Ralph R. Erickson =

American judge (born 1959)

Ralph Erickson
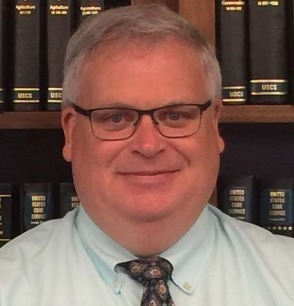

Senior Judge of the United States Court of Appeals for the Eighth Circuit
- Incumbent
- Assumed office July 28, 2026

Judge of the United States Court of Appeals for the Eighth Circuit
- In office October 12, 2017 – July 28, 2026
- Appointed by: Donald Trump
- Preceded by: Kermit Edward Bye
- Succeeded by: Daniel M. Traynor

Chief Judge of the United States District Court for the District of North Dakota
- In office November 1, 2009 – November 1, 2016
- Preceded by: Daniel L. Hovland
- Succeeded by: Daniel L. Hovland

Judge of the United States District Court for the District of North Dakota
- In office March 14, 2003 – October 13, 2017
- Appointed by: George W. Bush
- Preceded by: Rodney Scott Webb
- Succeeded by: Peter D. Welte

Personal details
- Born: Ralph Robert Erickson; April 28, 1959 (age 67) Thief River Falls, Minnesota, U.S.
- Education: University of Jamestown (BA); University of North Dakota (JD)

Ralph Robert Erickson (born April 28, 1959) is an American lawyer who serves as a Senior United States circuit judge of the United States Court of Appeals for the Eighth Circuit.

== Education and career ==
Born in Thief River Falls, Minnesota, Erickson received a Bachelor of Arts degree from Jamestown College in 1980 and a Juris Doctor from the University of North Dakota School of Law in 1984. He was in private practice in West Fargo, North Dakota, from 1984 to 1994. He was a magistrate judge for the Cass County Court, North Dakota from 1993 to 1994. He was a county judge for the Traill, Steele, Nelson & Griggs Counties Court, North Dakota in 1994. He was a state district judge for the East Central Judicial District Court, North Dakota from 1995 to 2003.

== Federal judicial service ==
=== District Court service ===
On January 7, 2003, Erickson was nominated by President George W. Bush to a seat on the United States District Court for the District of North Dakota vacated by Rodney Scott Webb. He was confirmed by the United States Senate on March 12, 2003, and received his commission on March 14, 2003. He served as chief judge from 2009 to 2016. His service on the district court terminated on October 13, 2017, upon elevation to the court of appeals.

=== Court of Appeals service ===
On June 7, 2017, President Donald Trump nominated Erickson to serve as a United States circuit judge of the United States Court of Appeals for the Eighth Circuit, to the seat vacated by Judge Kermit Edward Bye, who assumed senior status on April 22, 2015. A hearing on his nomination before the Senate Judiciary Committee took place on July 25, 2017. On September 14, 2017, his nomination was reported out of committee by a 20–0 vote. On September 28, 2017, the United States Senate invoked cloture on his nomination by a 95–1 vote. His nomination was confirmed that same day by a 95–1 vote. He received his judicial commission on October 12, 2017. He is the chairperson of the United States Judicial Conference Committee on Codes of Conduct. He assumed senior status on July 28, 2026.

== Personal life ==
Erickson spoke about his personal struggle overcoming alcoholism during his hearing in front of the Senate Judiciary Committee. Senator Al Franken asked, "May I ask you how long you've been in recovery?", to which Erickson answered "It's over 26 years, Nov. 10, 1990, at 4 o'clock in the afternoon, sir."

Legal offices
Preceded by Rodney Scott Webb	Judge of the United States District Court for the District of North Dakota; 2003–2017	Succeeded by Peter D. Welte
Preceded by Daniel L. Hovland	Chief Judge of the United States District Court for the District of North Dakota; 2009–2016	Succeeded by Daniel L. Hovland
Preceded by Kermit Edward Bye	Judge of the United States Court of Appeals for the Eighth Circuit; 2017–2026	Succeeded by Daniel M. Traynor
