= Ronald N. Davies Federal Building and U.S. Courthouse =

- U.S. Post Office and Courthouse
- U.S. National Register of Historic Places
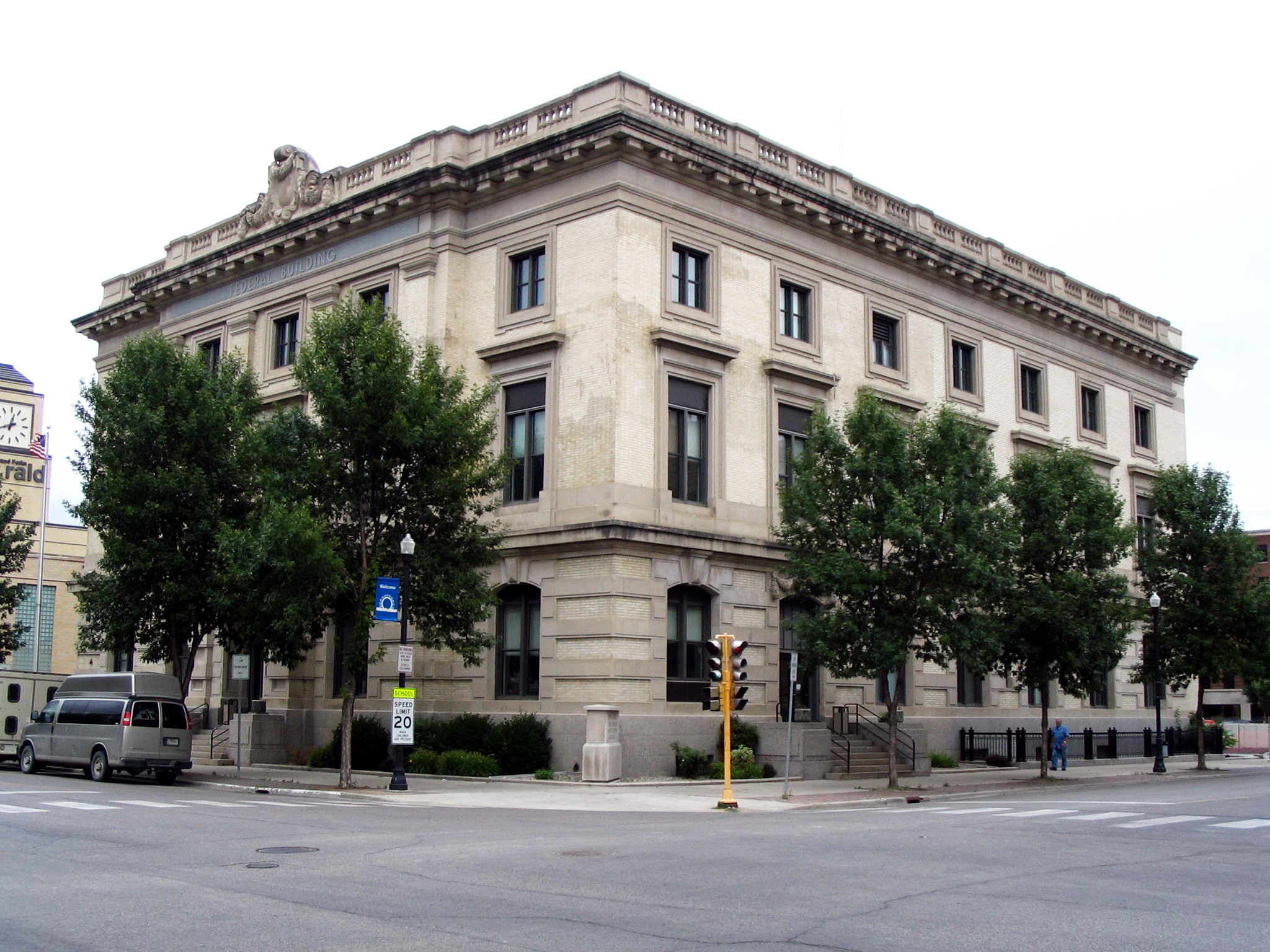
- U.S. Post Office and Federal Building, July 2006

- Location within North Dakota Location within the United States
- Location: 102 N. 4th St., Grand Forks, North Dakota
- Coordinates: 47°55′32″N 97°1′57″W
- Area: less than one acre
- Built: 1905
- Architect: Taylor, James Knox
- Architectural style: Classical Revival
- NRHP reference No.: 76001354
- Added to NRHP: June 3, 1976

The Ronald N. Davies Federal Building and U.S. Courthouse is a historic post office and federal office building located at Grand Forks in Grand Forks County, North Dakota, United States. It is a courthouse for the United States District Court for the District of North Dakota. Also and historically known as U.S. Post Office and Courthouse, the building is listed on the National Register of Historic Places under that name.

== Building history ==
The building was among the first monumental civic buildings in Grand Forks. Originally completed in 1906, the building was envisioned to be a majestic Post Office and Federal Courthouse at a time when Grand Forks was achieving increasing prominence in the agricultural hub of the Red River Valley. The city's existing post office, housed in an 1870s log cabin, had become obsolete and rising political and business influences demanded a more monumental and permanent post office and courthouse. The new Federal building was sited at the north corner of Fourth Street and First Avenue in the downtown business district.

James Knox Taylor, Supervising Architect of the U.S. Treasury Department, was responsible for the building's Beaux-Arts Classical design. The building inspired similar architecture for the adjacent enclave of Classical Revival buildings, including City Hall and Central High School.

In 1936, the demand for more space prompted the construction of a three-story addition to the rear of the building, designed by Louis A. Simon of the Supervising Architect's Office. The addition harmonized modern infrastructure with the original architecture by using like materials and details. The new configuration included passenger elevators and a light well to illuminate the first-floor work areas.

In 1964, when the U.S. Postal Service moved out of the building and into a new, larger facility, interior renovations remodeled the first floor into offices, adding a new stair tower to the north side of the building.

In 2001, the building was renamed after Federal District Judge Ronald N. Davies, pursuant to legislation sponsored by Senator Byron Dorgan, and signed into law by President Bill Clinton the previous year. Judge Davies served in the municipal courts in Grand Forks from 1932–40, and was appointed by President Dwight D. Eisenhower as the U.S. District Court Judge of North Dakota. Davies presided over the Stromsodt v. Parke-Davis and Company case in 1966, a case that involved a damage suit against one of the nation's largest pharmaceutical manufacturers, and, while on temporary assignment, "made a monumental decision to desegregate schools in Little Rock, Ark[ansas]" in 1957.

The building was listed in the National Register of Historic Places in 1976.

== Architecture ==
The Ronald N. Davies Federal Building and U.S. Courthouse reflects James Knox Taylor's mannered use of classicism to create an imposing architectural statement of the Federal Government's presence in Grand Forks. The building is a three-story, rectangular, masonry structure of yellow brick and limestone detailing that creates one of the most prominent displays of Beaux-Arts Classicism in the city. Federal Government architects embraced classicism during the early twentieth century as a method of symbolizing democratic ideals of government and power. The distinctive style is exemplified in the building's symmetry, central emphasis, and classical ornamentation.

On the facade, the most elaborate decorative features are reserved for the centralized three-bay section. Like the secondary elevations, the facade is composed of three horizontal zones. A rusticated base of alternating bands of limestone and brick courses is differentiated from the smooth limestone walls of the upper stories, which form the middle zone. The upper stories are articulated fenestration framed by colossal Tuscan order pilasters. The third zone is defined by the entablature, including a blank frieze surmounted by a heavy dentil molding, projecting cornice, and balustraded parapet, composed of alternating balusters with raised panels. A large festooned cartouche at the parapet is a crowning feature of the central bay's vertical axis.

Refined Beaux-Arts embellishments accentuate the facade's key features. The main entrance is prominently centered and framed by a segmental arch bedecked by a keystone and festooned swags, and banded pilasters, which support an "audience balcony" above.

The interior public spaces are monumental in scale and classical in detail. The first-floor entry lobby, while reduced in size from its original configuration, retains its 16-foot (4.9 m) ceiling, featuring a cast-plaster cornice, moldings, soffits, and modillions. Marble adorns the walls and window sills. A central marble staircase with a richly ornamented cast-iron balustrade ascends from the first-floor lobby to the upper floors. The second- and third-floor finishes are generally unchanged from their original condition, consisting of white marble wainscoting and green marble base and trim. Second- and third-floor public corridors have coved ceilings with cast-plaster picture moldings at the spring line.

The courtroom - with monumental proportions - represents a dignity apropos of its function as a Federal courthouse. Its coffered, 24-foot (7.3 m) ceiling features dentil molding, modillions, and plaster acanthus leaves and buds that grace each coffer's perimeter. The walls are divided by wood wainscoting surmounted by raised plaster panels with molding surrounds. Windows extend upwards from the wainscoting and are partially trimmed on three sides with cast-plaster acanthus leaves matching those on the ceiling. From its earliest period, the courtroom has been carefully preserved. When the judge's bench and jury boxes were relocated from the east to the west wall in 1936, the alterations to the wainscoting, plaster ceiling details, and the wall panels were painstakingly matched to existing 1906 finishes.

Because few older buildings in the city's central business district have survived unmodified, the Ronald N. Davies Federal Building and U.S. Courthouse stands as an unusual example of a monumental structure essentially unaltered. As it has for the past century, the building today represents the Federal presence and stands as a visual focus and historic architectural antecedent in downtown Grand Forks.

== Significant events ==
- 1905-06: The Post Office and Federal Courthouse in Grand Forks is constructed.
- 1927: Designs are made for the building's rear addition, providing more space for U.S. Postal Service offices.
- 1936: The rear addition is completed and opened to the public.
- 1964: The U.S. Postal Service moves to a new, larger facility. Major renovations convert the existing workspaces into offices.
- 1976: The building is listed in the National Register of Historic Places.
- 2002: The building is named after Federal District Judge Ronald N. Davies.

== Building facts ==
- Architects: James Knox Taylor; Louis A. Simon
- Construction dates: 1905-06; 1936
- Landmark status: Listed in the National Register of Historic Places
- Location: 102 North 4th Street
- Architectural style: Beaux-Arts
- Primary materials: Yellow brick masonry, limestone
- Prominent features: Beaux-Arts exterior ornament, Historic Courtroom with original 1906 detailing.
