= United States Post Office and Courthouse (Bismarck, North Dakota) =

- U.S. Post Office and Courthouse
- U.S. National Register of Historic Places
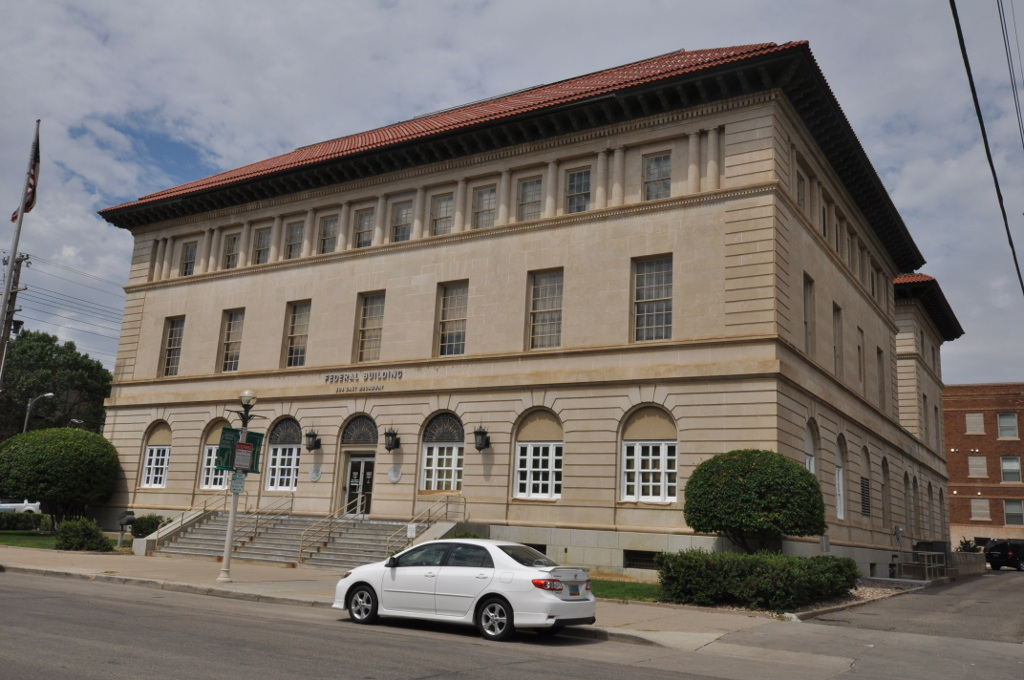

- Location within North Dakota Location within the United States
- Location: 304 E. Broadway, Bismarck, North Dakota
- Coordinates: 46°48′25″N 100°47′13″W
- Area: 0.6 acres (0.24 ha)
- Built: 1912–13
- Architect: James Knox Taylor
- Architectural style: Second Renaissance Revival
- NRHP reference No.: 76001353
- Added to NRHP: June 23, 1976

The U.S. Post Office and Courthouse in Bismarck, North Dakota, United States, was built during 1912–13 and expanded in 1937. It was designed by James Knox Taylor and includes Late 19th and 20th Century Revivals architecture and Second Renaissance Revival architecture. Also known as Federal Building, it served historically as a courthouse and as a post office. The building was listed on the National Register of Historic Places in 1976.

It is notable as one of the last works of James Knox Taylor, who was Supervising Architect of the U.S. Treasury from 1897 until 1912.

It is a three-story, steel-framed building with reinforced concrete floors and a red tile roof that can be seen from far away to the south. It was approximately 100 feet (30 m) wide (on Broadway) by 64 feet (20 m) deep (on Third Street) when completed in 1913, then deepened to 115 feet (35 m) in 1937.
