= Bruce M. Van Sickle Federal Building and U.S. Courthouse =

- U.S. Post Office
- U.S. National Register of Historic Places

- Location within North Dakota Location within the United States
- Location: 100 1st St., SW, Minot, North Dakota
- Coordinates: 48°14′4″N 101°17′36″W
- Area: less than one acre
- Built: 1915
- Architect: Oscar Wenderoth
- Architectural style: Italian Renaissance Revival
- NRHP reference No.: 80002930
- Added to NRHP: October 14, 1980

The Bruce M. Van Sickle Federal Building and U.S. Courthouse is a historic courthouse and post office in Downtown Minot, North Dakota. Built in 1915, its design is credited to Oscar Wenderoth. Since the post office relocated, it is officially known as the Judge Bruce M. Van Sickle Federal Building and U.S. Courthouse or the Van Sickle Federal Building. It currently houses the United States District Court for the District of North Dakota.

The building was listed on the National Register of Historic Places (NRHP) in 1980. It includes Italian Renaissance Revival architecture.

The building cost $124,000 to construct. According to its NRHP nomination, "Minot citizens were intensely proud of their new federal structure which was considered to be one of the finest in the Northwest and joyously participated in its midnight opening on June 12, 1915." It was named in honor of district court judge Bruce Van Sickle in 2002.
