= Greenville Township, LaMoure County, North Dakota =

- Township
- Location within the state of North Dakota
- Coordinates: 46°24′23″N 98°5′13″W
- Country: United States
- State: North Dakota
- County: LaMoure

Area
  - Total: 35.9 sq mi (93 km^{2})
  - Land: 35.9 sq mi (93 km^{2})
- Elevation: 1,486 ft (453 m)

Population (2020)
  - Total: 54
  - Density: 1.5/sq mi (0.58/km^{2})
- Time zone: UTC-6 (Central (CST))
  - Summer (DST): UTC-5 (CDT)
- Area code: 701
- FIPS code: 38-33460
- GNIS feature ID: 1036894

Greenville Township is a township in LaMoure County in the U.S. state of North Dakota. Its population at the 2020 census was 54.
