= Bachelor of Science in Law =

Academic degree

The Bachelor of Science in Law (BSL) is a special-purpose undergraduate degree that is typically intended for students who have completed some undergraduate education, but not received a baccalaureate degree, and are intending to resume their education and commence the study of law, ultimately towards a Juris Doctor degree, but need a bachelor's degree first. Academic work at the start of a law program is sometimes combined with previous academic credit to form the basis of a BSL award. The BSL degree is also sometimes intended for students who do not intend to attend law school, but are instead becoming paralegals or other legal assistants.

== See also ==
- Juris Doctor
