= Judge Bradford =

Judge Bradford may refer to:

- Allen Alexander Bradford (1815–1888), judge of the supreme court of the Colorado Territory
- Cale J. Bradford (fl. 1980s–2020s), chief judge of the Indiana Court of Appeals
- Edward Green Bradford (1819–1884), judge of the United States District Court for the District of Delaware
- Edward Green Bradford II (1848–1928), judge of the United States District Court for the District of Delaware

== See also ==
- William Bradford (Attorney General) (1755–1795), justice of the Supreme Court of Pennsylvania
