= Jennifer L. Hall =

American judge (born 1976)

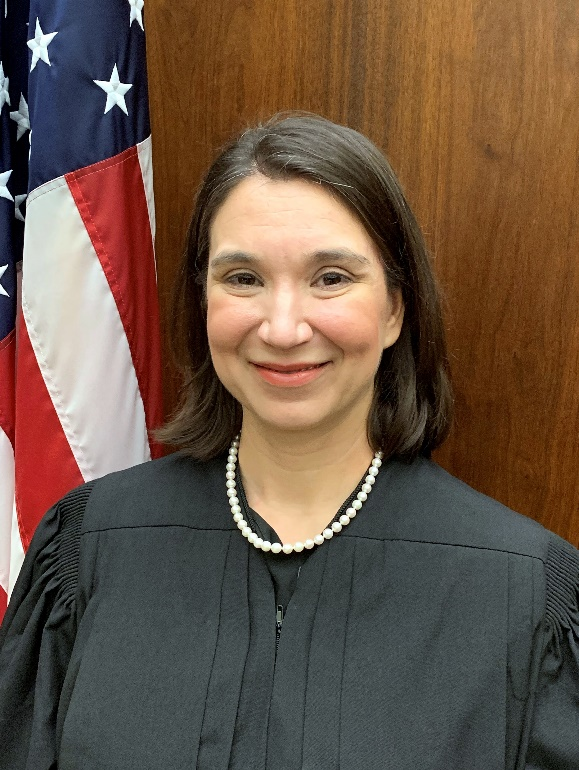

Judge of the United States District Court for the District of Delaware
- Incumbent
- Assumed office January 4, 2024
- Appointed by: Joe Biden
- Preceded by: Richard G. Andrews

Magistrate Judge of the United States District Court for the District of Delaware
- In office June 8, 2019 – January 4, 2024
- Preceded by: new seat
- Succeeded by: Eleanor G. Tennyson

Personal details
- Born: Jennifer Lynne Larson; 1976 (age 49–50) Minneapolis, Minnesota, U.S.
- Education: University of Minnesota (BS); Yale University (MPhil, PhD); University of Pennsylvania (JD)

Jennifer Lynne Hall (née Larson; born 1976) is an American lawyer who has served as a United States district judge of the United States District Court for the District of Delaware since 2024. She previously served as a United States magistrate judge of the same court from 2019 to 2024.

== Education ==
Hall received a Bachelor of Science in biochemistry from the University of Minnesota in 1997 and a Master of Philosophy in 2000 and a Doctor of Philosophy in 2003, both in molecular biophysics and biochemistry from Yale University. She received a Juris Doctor, magna cum laude, from the University of Pennsylvania Law School in 2006.

== Career ==
Hall served as a law clerk for Judge Sharon Prost of the United States Court of Appeals for the Federal Circuit from 2006 to 2007 and for Judge Kent A. Jordan of the United States Court of Appeals for the Third Circuit from 2007 to 2008. From 2008 to 2011, Hall was an associate at Fish & Richardson P.C. in Wilmington, where she litigated patent and copyright cases. From 2011 to 2015, she served as an assistant United States attorney in the U.S. Attorney's Office for the District of Delaware and from 2015 to 2019, she served as chief of the office's Civil Division.

=== Federal judicial service ===
In February 2019, she was selected to serve as a United States magistrate judge of the United States District Court for the District of Delaware. She assumed office on June 8, 2019.

On June 28, 2023, President Joe Biden announced his intent to nominate Hall to serve as a United States district judge of the United States District Court for the District of Delaware. On July 11, 2023, her nomination was sent to the Senate. President Biden nominated Hall to the seat being vacated by Judge Richard G. Andrews, who subsequently assumed senior status on December 31, 2023. On July 26, 2023, a hearing on her nomination was held before the Senate Judiciary Committee. During her confirmation hearing, she was questioned by Senator Lindsey Graham about her knowledge of U.S. Attorney David C. Weiss' investigation of Hunter Biden. Hall said she could not comment on a pending investigation but that she was not involved in the Biden probe. On September 14, 2023, her nomination was reported out of committee by a 16–5 vote. On October 16, 2023, the United States Senate invoked cloture on her nomination by a 63–26 vote. On October 17, 2023, her nomination was confirmed by a 67–29 vote. She received her judicial commission on January 4, 2024.

==== Notable rulings ====
In 2022, she was the judge for the Innovative Memory Systems versus Micron Technology, Inc. case. The case involves claims by IMS of patent infringement by Micron on non-volatile memory device technology.

Legal offices
Preceded by Richard G. Andrews	Judge of the United States District Court for the District of Delaware; 2024–present	Incumbent
