= Roderick R. McKelvie =

American judge (born 1946)

Judge of the United States District Court for the District of Delaware
- In office March 2, 1992 – June 28, 2002
- Appointed by: George H. W. Bush
- Preceded by: Murray Merle Schwartz
- Succeeded by: Kent A. Jordan

Personal details
- Born: Roderick R. McKelvie; 1946 (age 79–80) Maldon, England
- Education: Harvard University (BA); University of Pennsylvania Law School (JD)

Roderick R. McKelvie (born 1946) is a former United States district judge of the United States District Court for the District of Delaware.

== Education and career ==
Born in Maldon, England, McKelvie received a Bachelor of Arts degree from Harvard University in 1968 and a Juris Doctor from the University of Pennsylvania Law School in 1973. He was a law clerk for Judge Caleb Rodney Layton III of the United States District Court for the District of Delaware from 1973 to 1974. He was in private practice in Wilmington, Delaware from 1974 to 1992.

== Federal judicial service ==
On November 5, 1991, McKelvie was nominated by President George H. W. Bush to a seat on the United States District Court for the District of Delaware vacated by Judge Murray Merle Schwartz. McKelvie was confirmed by the United States Senate on February 27, 1992, and received his commission on March 2, 1992. McKelvie served in that capacity for a decade, during which time over 200 patent infringement cases were filed in his court, of which over 30 went to trial. He resigned from the bench on June 28, 2002. He thereafter returned to private practice with the firm of Covington & Burling in Washington, D.C., but has since retired.

== Sources ==
- FJC Bio

Legal offices
Preceded by Murray Merle Schwartz	Judge of the United States District Court for the District of Delaware; 1992–2002	Succeeded by Kent A. Jordan
