= Leonard P. Stark =

American judge (born 1969)

Leonard Stark
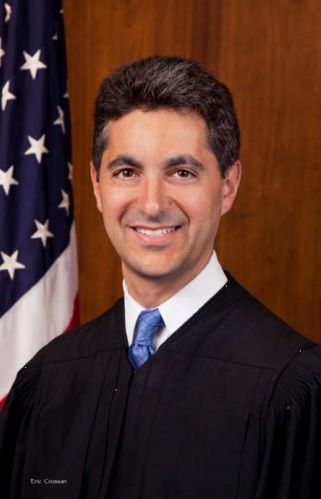

Judge of the United States Court of Appeals for the Federal Circuit
- Incumbent
- Assumed office March 16, 2022
- Appointed by: Joe Biden
- Preceded by: Kathleen M. O'Malley

Chief Judge of the United States District Court for the District of Delaware
- In office July 1, 2014 – July 1, 2021
- Preceded by: Gregory M. Sleet
- Succeeded by: Colm Connolly

Judge of the United States District Court for the District of Delaware
- In office August 10, 2010 – March 17, 2022
- Appointed by: Barack Obama
- Preceded by: Kent A. Jordan
- Succeeded by: Gregory B. Williams

Personal details
- Born: Leonard Philip Stark; 1969 (age 56–57) Detroit, Michigan, U.S.
- Education: University of Delaware (BA, BS, MA); Magdalen College, Oxford (PhD); Yale University (JD)

Leonard Philip Stark (born 1969) is an American lawyer who serves as a United States circuit judge of the United States Court of Appeals for the Federal Circuit. He is a former United States district judge of the United States District Court for the District of Delaware and was a United States magistrate judge of the same district.

== Early life and education ==
Stark was born in 1969, in Detroit, Michigan. He earned a Bachelor of Arts and a Bachelor of Science in history and political science and a Master of Arts in history from the University of Delaware, all in 1991. Stark also earned a Doctor of Philosophy in politics from Magdalen College at the University of Oxford in 1993 as a Rhodes Scholar. In 1996, Stark earned a Juris Doctor from Yale Law School.

== Professional career ==
From 1996 to 1997, Stark served as a law clerk for United States Court of Appeals for the Third Circuit Judge Walter King Stapleton. From 1997 to 2001, Stark was an associate with the Wilmington, Delaware office of the law firm Skadden, Arps, Slate, Meagher & Flom, where he specialized in corporate and securities law. From 2002 to 2007, Stark served as an assistant United States attorney in Wilmington, Delaware. Since 2016, he has been an adjunct professor of law at the University of Pennsylvania Carey Law School.

== Federal judicial service ==
In 2007, the judges on the United States District Court for the District of Delaware selected Stark to be a United States magistrate judge in Wilmington.

On March 17, 2010, President Barack Obama nominated Stark to fill the district court vacancy created by the elevation of Judge Kent A. Jordan to the United States Court of Appeals for the Third Circuit in 2006. On August 5, 2010, he was confirmed in the United States Senate by voice vote and he received his judicial commission on August 10, 2010. He became Chief Judge on July 1, 2014, and served until July 1, 2021. His service as the district court judge was terminated on March 17, 2022 when he was elevated to the court of appeals.

=== Court of appeals service ===
On November 3, 2021, President Joe Biden nominated Stark to serve as a United States circuit judge for the United States Court of Appeals for the Federal Circuit. President Biden nominated Stark to the seat vacated by Judge Kathleen M. O'Malley, who subsequently retired on March 11, 2022. On December 1, 2021, a hearing on his nomination was held before the Senate Judiciary Committee. On January 3, 2022, his nomination was returned to the President under Rule XXXI, Paragraph 6 of the United States Senate; he was later renominated the same day. On January 13, 2022, his nomination was favorably reported by the committee by a 16–6 vote. On January 20, 2022, Majority Leader Chuck Schumer filed cloture on his nomination. On February 3, 2022, the Senate invoked cloture on his nomination by a 54–33 vote. On February 9, 2022, his nomination was confirmed by a 61–35 vote. He received his judicial commission on March 16, 2022. He was sworn in on March 17, 2022.

Legal offices
| Preceded by Kent A. Jordan | Judge of the United States District Court for the District of Delaware; 2010–2022 | Succeeded by Gregory B. Williams |
| Preceded by Gregory M. Sleet | Chief Judge of the United States District Court for the District of Delaware; 2014–2021 | Succeeded by Colm Connolly |
| Preceded by Kathleen M. O'Malley | Judge of the United States Court of Appeals for the Federal Circuit; 2022–present | Incumbent |
