= Judge Leighton =

Judge Leighton may refer to:

- George N. Leighton (1912–2018), judge of the United States District Court for the Northern District of Illinois
- Ronald B. Leighton (born 1951), judge of the United States District Court for the Western District of Washington

== See also ==
- Caleb Rodney Layton III (1907–1988), judge of the United States District Court for the District of Delaware
