= John Nields =

John Nields could refer to:

- John Percy Nields (1868–1943), American jurist
- John W. Nields Jr. (born 1942), American lawyer
