= Judge Leahy =

Judge Leahy may refer to:

- Edward L. Leahy (1886–1953), judge of the United States District Court for the District of Rhode Island
- Paul Conway Leahy (1904–1966), judge of the United States District Court for the District of Delaware
