= Judge O'Brien =

Judge O'Brien may refer to:

- Donald E. O'Brien (1923–2015), judge of the United States District Courts for the Northern and Southern Districts of Iowa
- Ernest Aloysius O'Brien (1880–1948), judge of the United States District Court for the Eastern District of Michigan
- Terrence L. O'Brien (born 1943), judge of the United States Court of Appeals for the Tenth Circuit
