= Caleb Layton =

Caleb Layton may refer to:

- Caleb S. Layton (1798–1882), American politician from Delaware
- Caleb R. Layton (1851–1930), American physician and politician from Delaware
- Caleb Rodney Layton III (1907–1988), United States federal judge
