= Colm Connolly =

American judge (born 1964)

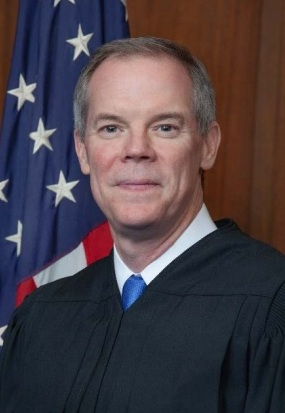

Chief Judge of the United States District Court for the District of Delaware
- Incumbent
- Assumed office July 1, 2021
- Preceded by: Leonard P. Stark

Judge of the United States District Court for the District of Delaware
- Incumbent
- Assumed office August 3, 2018
- Appointed by: Donald Trump
- Preceded by: Sue Lewis Robinson

United States Attorney for the District of Delaware
- In office September 2001 – January 20, 2009
- President: George W. Bush
- Preceded by: Carl Schnee
- Succeeded by: Charles Oberly

Personal details
- Born: Colm Felix Connolly; October 18, 1964 (age 61) Wilmington, Delaware, U.S.
- Education: University of Notre Dame (BA); London School of Economics (MSc); Duke University (JD)

Colm Felix Connolly (born October 18, 1964) is the chief United States district judge of the United States District Court for the District of Delaware. He formerly served as United States Attorney for the District of Delaware.

== Biography and career ==
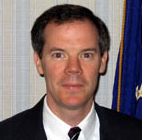
Connolly as a US Attorney

Connolly was born on October 18, 1964, in Wilmington, Delaware. He attended Archmere Academy in Claymont, Delaware, and graduated from the University of Notre Dame in 1986 with a Bachelor of Arts degree with honors. The following year, he earned a Master of Science degree from the London School of Economics. After spending a year as a special assistant to the Delaware Secretary of Finance, Connolly attended Duke University School of Law, where he was an editor of Law and Contemporary Problems and served on the moot court board. He graduated in 1991 with a Juris Doctor with honors.

After graduating from law school, Connolly clerked for Judge Walter King Stapleton of the United States Court of Appeals for the Third Circuit, and then spent seven years as an Assistant United States Attorney for the District of Delaware. In 1994 and 1995, Connolly prosecuted the first federal criminal civil rights case in Delaware history. One of the defendants, Mark Hobbs, ultimately pled guilty to a civil rights conspiracy charge. The other defendant, Robert Hanulik, pled guilty to civil rights and firearms charges and was sentenced as an armed career criminal to 15 years imprisonment.

Connolly later became known for leading the 18-month investigation into the 1996 disappearance of Anne Marie Fahey, the secretary to Delaware's governor, Tom Carper. Connolly worked alongside Wilmington Police Officer Robert Donovan and FBI Special Agent Eric Alpert. The investigation resulted in a first-degree murder charge against Thomas Capano. Connolly and Ferris Wharton prosecuted the case against Capano. The three-month trial began in November 1998, and despite the fact that the prosecution presented no evidence of a body or weapon and no witness to the killing, the jury returned a guilty verdict and recommended the death penalty. Connolly's cross-examination of Capano at trial culminated in a frustrated Capano standing up and shouting at Connolly, "You heartless, gutless, soulless disgrace of a human being!" and then being ejected from the courtroom by Judge William Swain Lee.

The Capano case spawned four books and the made-for-television movie, And Never Let Her Go (2001), directed by Peter Levin. Connolly was portrayed by Steven Eckholdt and made a cameo appearance in the movie. Mark Harmon portrayed Capano.

Connolly left the U.S. Attorney's Office to become a partner at Morris, Nichols, Arsht & Tunnell in 1999. He then became the United States Attorney for the District of Delaware in 2001 after being nominated by President George W. Bush. In 2009, Connolly left the United States Department of Justice to become a partner at Morgan, Lewis & Bockius, where he worked until becoming a judge. At the U.S. Attorney's office, Connolly was succeeded by Charles M. Oberly III, with David C. Weiss serving as acting United States Attorney in the interim.

Connolly is a fellow of the American College of Trial Lawyers and a member of the American Law Institute.

== Federal judicial service ==
=== Expired district court nomination under George W. Bush ===
On February 26, 2008, Connolly was nominated by George W. Bush to fill the United States District Court for the District of Delaware seat vacated by Kent A. Jordan in 2006, who was elevated to the United States Court of Appeals for the Third Circuit. Although Connolly received a unanimous well qualified rating from the American Bar Association, the Senate Judiciary Committee did not afford him a hearing and therefore his nomination to the federal bench expired at the conclusion of the Senate's session in 2008. Senator Tom Carper returned his blue slip in support of Connolly, but then-Senator Joe Biden did not.

=== Renomination to district court under Trump ===
In 2017, Senators Chris Coons and Tom Carper recommended that the White House nominate Connolly to the seat vacated by Sue Lewis Robinson, who assumed senior status on February 3, 2017. On December 20, 2017, Connolly's renomination was announced and sent to the Senate. On February 14, 2018, a hearing on his nomination was held before the Senate Judiciary Committee. On March 15, 2018, his nomination was reported out of committee by a 20–1 vote. On August 1, 2018, his nomination was confirmed by voice vote. He received his judicial commission on August 3, 2018. He became chief judge on July 1, 2021.

Legal offices
Preceded by Carl Schnee	United States Attorney for the District of Delaware; 2001–2009	Succeeded by Charles M. Oberly III
Preceded by Sue Lewis Robinson	Judge of the United States District Court for the District of Delaware; 2018–present	Incumbent
Preceded by Leonard P. Stark	Chief Judge of the United States District Court for the District of Delaware; 2021–present	Incumbent
