= Maryellen Noreika =

American judge (born 1966)

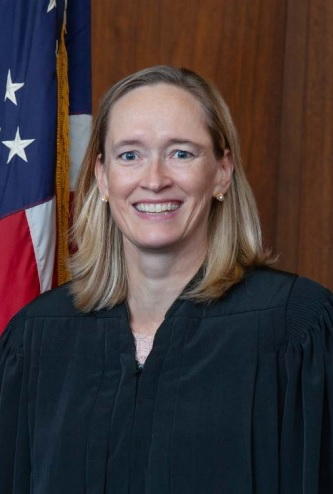

Judge of the United States District Court for the District of Delaware
- Incumbent
- Assumed office August 9, 2018
- Appointed by: Donald Trump
- Preceded by: Gregory M. Sleet

Personal details
- Born: July 12, 1966 (age 59) Pittsburgh, Pennsylvania, U.S.
- Party: Democratic
- Education: Lehigh University (BS); Columbia University (MA); University of Pittsburgh (JD)

Maryellen Noreika (born July 12, 1966) is an American lawyer and jurist serving since 2018 as a United States district judge of the United States District Court for the District of Delaware.

== Biography ==
Noreika was born in 1966 in Pittsburgh, Pennsylvania. She received a Bachelor of Science from Lehigh University in 1988 and a Master of Arts in biology from Columbia University in 1990. She then attended the University of Pittsburgh School of Law, where she was a member of the University of Pittsburgh Law Review. She graduated in 1993 with a Juris Doctor, magna cum laude, and Order of the Coif membership.

After law school, Noreika entered private practice at the Wilmington, Delaware law firm Morris, Nichols, Arsht & Tunnell. During her 25 years at Morris Nichols, Noreika served as counsel in more than 500 cases, while specializing in patent law, and representing parties in cases involving biotechnology, chemistry, consumer products, computer science, medical devices, and pharmaceuticals. Noreika worked at Morris, Nichols, Arsht & Tunnell until she became a judge.

Before becoming a judge, she made campaign donations to both Republican and Democratic candidates, but mostly to Republicans.

== Federal judicial service ==
On December 20, 2017, President Donald Trump nominated Noreika to serve as a United States District Judge of the United States District Court for the District of Delaware, to the seat vacated by Judge Gregory M. Sleet, who assumed senior status on May 1, 2017. Her nomination was part of a bipartisan package of nominees which included Colm Connolly. On February 14, 2018, a hearing on her nomination was held before the Senate Judiciary Committee On March 15, 2018, her nomination was reported out of committee by a voice vote. On August 1, 2018, her nomination was confirmed by a voice vote. She received her judicial commission on August 9, 2018. Maryellen Noreika has been considered a potential nominee for a federal judgeship in the Federal Circuit by President Joe Biden.

=== Notable cases ===
In 2023, Noreika presided over a case involving Hunter Biden laptop repairman John Paul Mac Isaac. He sued CNN, Politico, Hunter Biden, the Joe Biden 2020 presidential campaign, and Adam Schiff over allegations they defamed him by claiming the laptop's content was Russian propaganda. Noreika dismissed the part against Schiff, and sent the rest to Delaware Superior Court.

In 2023, Noreika was assigned to the criminal case against Hunter Biden. In July, Biden was expecting to plead guilty to two tax misdemeanors and enter a diversion program on a gun charge. Noreika declined to accept the deal, pending clarification of its terms by the parties. Biden pleaded not guilty on the tax charges.

Legal offices
Preceded by Gregory M. Sleet	Judge of the United States District Court for the District of Delaware; 2018–present	Incumbent
