= David J. Jordan =

American lawyer

United States Attorney for the District of Utah
- In office 1991–1993
- Appointed by: George H. W. Bush
- Preceded by: Dee Benson
- Succeeded by: Scott Matheson Jr.

Personal details
- Parent: Amos Jordan (father)
- Relatives: Kent A. Jordan (brother)
- Education: Bowdoin College (BA); Vanderbilt University (JD)

David J. Jordan was the United States Attorney for the District of Utah from 1991-1993 and has been the Chair of the Board of Regents of the Utah System of Higher Education since 2010.

== Background ==
Jordan was raised in West Point, New York. As a young man, he served as a missionary for the Church of Jesus Christ of Latter-day Saints in Brazil.

== Education ==
He earned his bachelor's degree at Bowdoin College and his Juris Doctor degree from Vanderbilt University. He then clerked with the federal court in Tennessee.

== Career ==
As a lawyer, he first worked with the VanCott firm. From 1989-1991 he was Chair of the Southern Utah University Board of Trustees. He again served as chair of the SUU board of trustees from 1993-1997, and starting in 1997 was a member of the Board of Regents of the Utah Higher Education System. In 2012, he was awarded an honorary doctorate from SUU.

He currently works as outside counsel for The Church of Jesus Christ of Latter-Day Saints, defending the institution against multiple allegations of sexual abuse at the hands of various leaders, including former Provo, UT, Missionary Training Center President Joseph L. Bishop.

== Family ==
In 1980, he married Holly Garrett. They have four children, eight grandchildren, and a dog named Poppy. Together they presided over the England London Mission for the Church of Jesus Christ of Latter-day Saints from July 2012 to July 2015.
