= Gregory M. Sleet =

American judge

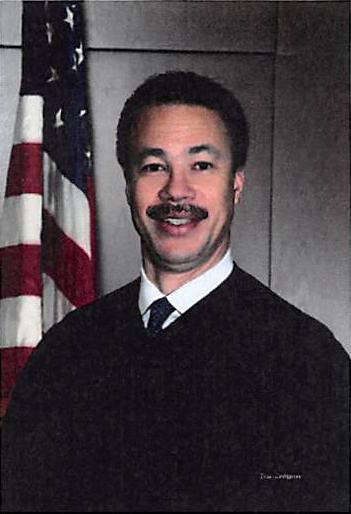

Senior Judge of the United States District Court for the District of Delaware
- In office May 1, 2017 – September 28, 2018

Chief Judge of the United States District Court for the District of Delaware
- In office 2007–2014
- Preceded by: Sue Lewis Robinson
- Succeeded by: Leonard P. Stark

Judge of the United States District Court for the District of Delaware
- In office April 30, 1998 – May 1, 2017
- Appointed by: Bill Clinton
- Preceded by: Joseph J. Longobardi
- Succeeded by: Maryellen Noreika

United States Attorney for the District of Delaware
- In office 1993–1998
- President: Bill Clinton
- Preceded by: William C. Carpenter, Jr.
- Succeeded by: Carl Schnee

Personal details
- Born: Gregory Moneta Sleet; March 8, 1951 (age 75) New York City, New York
- Education: Hampton University (B.A.); Rutgers School of Law–Camden (J.D.)

Gregory Moneta Sleet (born March 8, 1951, in New York City, New York) is a former United States district judge of the United States District Court for the District of Delaware.

== Education and career ==
Sleet was born in New York City, New York. He received a Bachelor of Arts degree from Hampton University in 1973. He received a Juris Doctor from Rutgers School of Law–Camden in 1976, where he was an Earl Warren Scholar. He was an assistant public defender, Defender Association of Philadelphia from 1976 to 1983. He was in private practice of law in Philadelphia, Pennsylvania, from 1983 to 1990. He was a deputy attorney general in the Department of Justice, State of Delaware from 1990 to 1992. He was a Counsel, Hercules Inc. from 1992 to 1994. He was the United States Attorney for the District of Delaware from 1994 to 1998. He was the first African American to be appointed United States Attorney in Delaware, and the first to be appointed the federal bench in Delaware.

== Federal judicial service ==
Sleet was a United States District Judge of the United States District Court for the District of Delaware. At the recommendation of then Delaware United States Senator Joe Biden, Sleet was nominated by President Bill Clinton on January 27, 1998, to a seat vacated by Joseph J. Longobardi. He was confirmed by the United States Senate on April 27, 1998, and received commission on April 30, 1998. He served as chief judge, from 2007 to 2014. He assumed senior status on May 1, 2017. In February 2018, Sleet announced his plan to retire from the federal bench in the fall of 2018. He retired on September 28, 2018.

== Experience and academic career ==
Due to the expertise and experience in patent law that Sleet has acquired from hearing numerous patent cases during his tenure as a District Judge and Chief Judge of the United States District Court for the District of Delaware, he also teaches courses in Patent Litigation at Duke University School of Law, Widener University School of Law and Rutgers University School of Law.

== Other service and honors ==
In 1995, Sleet was appointed by then U.S. Attorney General Janet Reno for a 2-year term to the Attorney General's Advisory Committee ("AGAC"), a group designed to set policy and strategy for the United States Department of Justice, and also a group which Sleet was made Vice Chair of in 1995-1995 by Reno in August 1995. In 1998, Delaware Today magazine selected Judge Sleet as "Delawarean of the Year" and in 2000, he was named one of "Fifty of the Finest" graduates in the first fifty years of Rutgers University.

Additionally, Judge Sleet was presented the Distinguished Service Award in 1994 by the National Association for the Advancement of Colored People (NAACP), Central Delaware Branch. Sleet is also a member of the Third Circuit Committee on Criminal Pattern Jury Instructions, the Third Circuit Judicial Council Automation & Technology Committee, the Third Circuit Judicial Council Facilities and Security Committee and Member of the Third Circuit Judicial Council Case Management Committee.

== Personal ==
He is the son of Pulitzer Prize-winning photographer Moneta Sleet Jr.

== See also ==
- List of African-American federal judges
- List of African-American jurists
- List of first minority male lawyers and judges in Delaware

Legal offices
Preceded by William C. Carpenter, Jr.	United States Attorney for the District of Delaware; 1993–1998	Succeeded by Carl Schnee
Preceded by Joseph J. Longobardi	Judge of the United States District Court for the District of Delaware; 1998–2017	Succeeded by Maryellen Noreika
Preceded by Sue Lewis Robinson	Chief Judge of the United States District Court for the District of Delaware; 2007–2014	Succeeded by Leonard P. Stark
