= Sue Lewis Robinson =

American judge (born 1952)

Senior Judge of the United States District Court for the District of Delaware
- In office February 3, 2017 – July 14, 2017

Chief Judge of the United States District Court for the District of Delaware
- In office 2000–2007
- Preceded by: Joseph James Farnan Jr.
- Succeeded by: Gregory M. Sleet

Judge of the United States District Court for the District of Delaware
- In office November 18, 1991 – February 3, 2017
- Appointed by: George H. W. Bush
- Preceded by: Jane Richards Roth
- Succeeded by: Colm Connolly

Magistrate Judge of the United States District Court for the District of Delaware
- In office 1988–1991

Personal details
- Born: Sue Lewis; 1952 (age 73–74) Mount Carmel, Illinois, U.S.
- Education: University of Delaware (BA); University of Pennsylvania (JD)

Sue Lewis Robinson (born 1952) is a former United States District Judge who was part of the United States District Court for the District of Delaware.

== Education and career ==
Born Sue Lewis in Mount Carmel, Illinois, Robinson received a Bachelor of Arts degree from the University of Delaware in 1974 and a Juris Doctor from the University of Pennsylvania Law School in 1978. She was in private practice in Wilmington, Delaware from 1978 to 1983. She was an assistant United States attorney of the District of Delaware from 1983 to 1988.

=== Federal judicial service ===
Robinson was a United States magistrate judge of the District of Delaware from 1988 to 1991. On October 1, 1991, Robinson was nominated by President George H. W. Bush to a seat on the United States District Court for the District of Delaware vacated by Judge Jane Richards Roth. Robinson was confirmed by the United States Senate on November 15, 1991, and received her commission on November 18, 1991. She served as Chief Judge from 2000 to 2007. She assumed senior status on February 3, 2017. She retired from the federal bench on July 14, 2017.

=== Deshaun Watson arbitration ===
Robinson acted as an arbiter in the punishment of Deshaun Watson by the NFL. Robinson weighed evidence and evaluated the NFL's previous rulings on sexual assault cases and first-time offenders according to the NFL's own policy to decide on an appropriate suspension. Robinson concluded that the NFL proved its case that Watson leveraged his position as an NFL player to perform sexual acts without consent. Robinson handed down the minimum six-game suspension for Watson on August 1, 2022. Two days later on August 3, the NFL filed an appeal of the suspension. The appeal was dismissed by the mutual consent of the parties following a settlement that increased the suspension to an eleven-game term.

Legal offices
Preceded by Jane Richards Roth	Judge of the United States District Court for the District of Delaware; 1991–2017	Succeeded by Colm Connolly
Preceded by Joseph James Farnan Jr.	Chief Judge of the United States District Court for the District of Delaware; 2000–2007	Succeeded by Gregory M. Sleet
