= Gregory B. Williams =

American judge (born 1969)

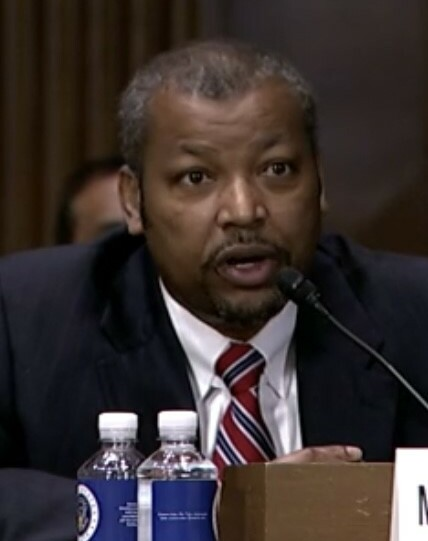

Judge of the United States District Court for the District of Delaware
- Incumbent
- Assumed office September 1, 2022
- Appointed by: Joe Biden
- Preceded by: Leonard P. Stark

Personal details
- Born: 1969 (age 56–57) Chester, Pennsylvania, U.S.
- Education: Millersville University of Pennsylvania (BA, BS); Villanova University (JD)

Military service
- Allegiance: United States
- Branch/service: United States Army; United States Army Reserve
- Years of service: 1986–1992

Gregory Brian Williams (born 1969) is an American lawyer from Delaware who serves as a United States district judge of United States District Court for the District of Delaware.

== Education ==
Williams received both a Bachelor of Arts and Bachelor of Science from Millersville University of Pennsylvania in 1990 and a Juris Doctor from Villanova University School of Law in 1995.

== Career ==
Williams served in the United States Army Reserve from 1986 to 1992. He joined the Wilmington, Delaware, office of Fox Rothschild LLP in 1995 as an associate and was elevated to partner in 2003, where he specialized in commercial law and patent law. He served as a special master in complex civil cases for the District of Delaware from 2020 to 2022.

== Federal judicial service ==
On April 13, 2022, President Joe Biden announced his intent to nominate Williams to serve as a United States district judge of the United States District Court for the District of Delaware. On April 25, 2022, his nomination was sent to the Senate. President Biden nominated Williams to the seat vacated by Judge Leonard P. Stark, who was elevated to the Federal Circuit Court on March 17, 2022. On May 11, 2022, a hearing on his nomination was held before the Senate Judiciary Committee. On June 9, 2022, his nomination was reported out of the committee by an 11–9–2 vote, with Senators Patrick Leahy and Thom Tillis passed on the vote. On July 20, 2022, the United States Senate invoked cloture on his nomination by a 52–43 vote. His nomination was confirmed later that day by a 52–43 vote. He received his judicial commission on September 1, 2022.

== See also ==
- List of African-American federal judges
- List of African-American jurists

Legal offices
Preceded by Leonard P. Stark	Judge of the United States District Court for the District of Delaware; 2022–present	Incumbent
