= Edwin DeHaven Steel Jr. =

American judge

Senior Judge of the United States District Court for the District of Delaware
- In office December 30, 1969 – July 26, 1986

Judge of the United States District Court for the District of Delaware
- In office April 23, 1958 – December 30, 1969
- Appointed by: Dwight D. Eisenhower
- Preceded by: Paul Conway Leahy
- Succeeded by: Walter King Stapleton

Personal details
- Born: Edwin DeHaven Steel Jr. May 7, 1904 Philadelphia, Pennsylvania
- Died: July 26, 1986 (aged 82)
- Education: Dartmouth College (A.B.); Yale Law School (LL.B.)

Edwin DeHaven Steel Jr. (May 7, 1904 – July 26, 1986) was a United States district judge of the United States District Court for the District of Delaware.

== Education and career ==
Born in Philadelphia, Pennsylvania, Steel received an Artium Baccalaureus degree from Dartmouth College in 1926. He received a Bachelor of Laws from Yale Law School in 1931. He was in private practice in Wilmington, Delaware from 1931 to 1958. He was general counsel for War Materials, Inc. in 1942.

== Federal judicial service ==
Steel was nominated by President Dwight D. Eisenhower on March 26, 1958, to a seat on the United States District Court for the District of Delaware vacated by Judge Paul Conway Leahy. He was confirmed by the United States Senate on April 22, 1958, and received his commission on April 23, 1958. He assumed senior status due to a certified disability on December 30, 1969. Steel served in that capacity until his death on July 26, 1986.

== Sources ==
Legal offices
Preceded by Paul Conway Leahy	Judge of the United States District Court for the District of Delaware; 1958–1969	Succeeded by Walter King Stapleton
