= Joseph J. Longobardi =

American judge (born 1930)

Senior Judge of the United States District Court for the District of Delaware
- Incumbent
- Assumed office June 15, 1997

Chief Judge of the United States District Court for the District of Delaware
- In office 1989–1996
- Preceded by: Murray Merle Schwartz
- Succeeded by: Joseph James Farnan Jr.

Judge of the United States District Court for the District of Delaware
- In office May 3, 1984 – June 15, 1997
- Appointed by: Ronald Reagan
- Preceded by: James Levin Latchum
- Succeeded by: Gregory M. Sleet

Personal details
- Born: April 29, 1930 (age 95) Wilmington, Delaware, U.S.
- Education: Washington College (BA); Temple University (LLB)

Joseph J. Longobardi (born April 29, 1930) is an inactive senior United States district judge of the United States District Court for the District of Delaware.

== Education and career ==
Born in Wilmington, Delaware, Longobardi received a Bachelor of Arts degree from Washington College in 1952 and a Bachelor of Laws from Temple University School of Law in 1957. He was in private practice in Delaware from 1957 to 1959. He was a deputy state attorney general of Delaware from 1959 to 1961. He was in private practice in Wilmington from 1964 to 1974. He was a member of the Delaware Tax Appeal Board from 1973 to 1974. He was a judge of the Delaware Superior Court from 1974 to 1982. He was a Vice Chancellor of the Delaware Court of Chancery from 1982 to 1984.

== Federal judicial service ==
Longobardi was nominated by President Ronald Reagan on April 4, 1984, to a seat on the United States District Court for the District of Delaware vacated by Judge James Levin Latchum. He was confirmed by the United States Senate on April 24, 1984, and received his commission on May 3, 1984. He served as Chief Judge from 1989 to 1996. He assumed senior status on June 15, 1997.

== Sources ==
Legal offices
Preceded by James Levin Latchum	Judge of the United States District Court for the District of Delaware; 1984–1997	Succeeded by Gregory M. Sleet
Preceded by Murray Merle Schwartz	Chief Judge of the United States District Court for the District of Delaware; 1989–1996	Succeeded by Joseph James Farnan Jr.
