= Richard G. Andrews =

American judge (born 1955)

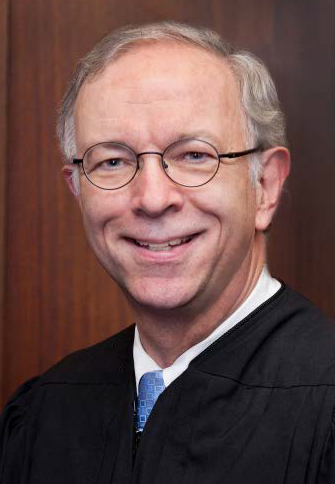

Senior Judge of the United States District Court for the District of Delaware
- Incumbent
- Assumed office December 31, 2023

Judge of the United States District Court for the District of Delaware
- In office November 7, 2011 – December 31, 2023
- Appointed by: Barack Obama
- Preceded by: Joseph James Farnan Jr.
- Succeeded by: Jennifer L. Hall

Personal details
- Born: Richard Gibson Andrews; December 22, 1955 (age 70) Manchester, England, U.K.
- Party: Democratic Party
- Education: Haverford College (BA); University of California, Berkeley (JD)

Richard Gibson Andrews (born December 22, 1955) is a senior United States district judge of the United States District Court for the District of Delaware. He is a former Delaware state prosecutor and assistant United States attorney.

== Early life and education ==
Andrews earned a Bachelor of Arts degree from Haverford College in 1977 and a Juris Doctor from the University of California, Berkeley School of Law in 1981. From 1981 until 1982, Andrews served as a law clerk for Judge Collins J. Seitz on the United States Court of Appeals for the Third Circuit.

== Career ==
From 1983 until 2006, Andrews worked as an assistant United States attorney for the District of Delaware. In 2007, Andrews was chosen as state prosecutor for the state of Delaware.

=== Federal judicial service ===
On May 11, 2011, President Barack Obama nominated Andrews to a seat on the United States District Court for the District of Delaware, to fill the vacancy created when Judge Joseph James Farnan Jr. retired on July 31, 2010. On September 8, 2011, the Senate Judiciary Committee reported his nomination to the Senate floor by voice vote. On November 3, 2011, the Senate confirmed Andrews by unanimous consent. He received his commission on November 7, 2011. He assumed senior status on December 31, 2023.

==== Notable Cases ====
In 2023, Judge Andrews presided over the receivership of the largest precious metals depository fraud in U.S. history. The judge “reluctantly” distributed the significant assets remaining in the vault according to labels the proprietor had applied to open boxes of coins, overruling a more equitable plan proposed by the Commodities Futures Trading Commission (CFTC). The judge’s plan caused variable distributions to victims— greater than 90% to some compared to less than 13% for others— which the judge noted was “simpler.” The judge also ordered $146 million in restitution from the bankrupt depository owner and his liquidated business.

The proprietor later was sentenced to 65 years in prison for falsifying records and commingling bullion as his personal “piggy bank.” Victims submitted impact statements describing hardship from losses of retirement, educational and life savings, which Judge Andrews ordered distributed to other claimants In an inequitable manner.

Legal offices
Preceded by Joseph James Farnan Jr.	Judge of the United States District Court for the District of Delaware; 2011–2023	Succeeded by Jennifer L. Hall
