= Murray Merle Schwartz =

American judge (1931–2013)

Senior Judge of the United States District Court for the District of Delaware
- In office July 24, 1989 – January 11, 2013

Chief Judge of the United States District Court for the District of Delaware
- In office 1985–1989
- Preceded by: Walter King Stapleton
- Succeeded by: Joseph J. Longobardi

Judge of the United States District Court for the District of Delaware
- In office April 17, 1974 – July 24, 1989
- Appointed by: Richard Nixon
- Preceded by: Caleb Merrill Wright
- Succeeded by: Roderick R. McKelvie

Personal details
- Born: Murray Merle Schwartz; March 23, 1931 Ephrata, Pennsylvania, U.S.
- Died: January 11, 2013 (aged 81) Hockessin, Delaware, U.S.
- Education: University of Pennsylvania (BS, LLB); University of Virginia (LLM)

Murray Merle Schwartz (March 23, 1931 – January 11, 2013) was a United States district judge of the United States District Court for the District of Delaware.

== Education and career ==
Born in Ephrata, Pennsylvania, Schwartz received a Bachelor of Science degree from the University of Pennsylvania, Wharton School of Business in 1952 and a Bachelor of Laws from the University of Pennsylvania Law School in 1955. He received a Master of Laws from the University of Virginia School of Law in 1982. He was a law clerk for Judge Caleb Merrill Wright of the United States District Court for the District of Delaware from 1955 to 1957.

Schwartz was in private practice in Wilmington, Delaware from 1958 to 1974. He was a referee in bankruptcy (part-time) for the United States District Court for the District of Delaware from 1969 to 1974.

== Federal judicial service ==
Schwartz was nominated by President Richard Nixon on March 21, 1974, to a seat on the United States District Court for the District of Delaware vacated by Judge Caleb Merrill Wright. He was confirmed by the United States Senate on April 5, 1974, and received his commission on April 17, 1974. He served as chief judge from 1985 to 1989. He assumed senior status due to a certified disability on July 24, 1989. His service terminated on January 11, 2013, due to his death in Hockessin, Delaware.

== See also ==
- List of Jewish American jurists

== Sources ==
Legal offices
Preceded by Caleb Merrill Wright	Judge of the United States District Court for the District of Delaware; 1974–1989	Succeeded by Roderick R. McKelvie
Preceded by Walter King Stapleton	Chief Judge of the United States District Court for the District of Delaware; 1985–1989	Succeeded by Joseph J. Longobardi
