= Joseph James Farnan Jr. =

American judge (born 1945)

Chief Judge of the United States District Court for the District of Delaware
- In office 1996–2000
- Preceded by: Joseph J. Longobardi
- Succeeded by: Sue Lewis Robinson

Judge of the United States District Court for the District of Delaware
- In office July 18, 1985 – July 31, 2010
- Appointed by: Ronald Reagan
- Preceded by: Seat established by 98 Stat. 333
- Succeeded by: Richard G. Andrews

United States Attorney for the District of Delaware
- In office 1981–1985
- President: Ronald Reagan
- Preceded by: James W. Garvin
- Succeeded by: William C. Carpenter

Personal details
- Born: Joseph James Farnan Jr. June 15, 1945 (age 80) Philadelphia, Pennsylvania
- Education: King's College (B.A.); University of Toledo College of Law (J.D.)

Joseph James Farnan Jr. (born June 15, 1945) is a former United States district judge of the United States District Court for the District of Delaware.

== Education and career ==
Born in Philadelphia, Pennsylvania, Farnan received a Bachelor of Arts degree from King's College in 1967 and a Juris Doctor from the University of Toledo College of Law in 1970. He was a Director of the Criminal Justice Program at Wilmington College in New Castle, Delaware from 1970 to 1972. He was an assistant public defender for the State of Delaware from 1972 to 1975, and was also in private practice in Wilmington, Delaware from 1972 to 1976. He was county attorney of New Castle County, Delaware from 1976 to 1979, and was chief deputy attorney general of the state of Delaware from 1979 to 1981. He was the United States Attorney for the District of Delaware from 1981 to 1985.

== Federal judicial service ==
On June 21, 1985, Farnan was nominated by President Ronald Reagan to a new seat on the United States District Court for the District of Delaware created by 98 Stat. 333. He was confirmed by the United States Senate on July 16, 1985, and received his commission on July 18, 1985. He served as Chief Judge from 1996 to 2000. He retired on July 31, 2010, having become the longest-serving member of the federal bench in Delaware.

== Post judicial service ==
Since his retirement from the bench, Farnan has served as an attorney in private practice at the law firm of Farnan LLP.

Legal offices
Preceded by Seat established by 98 Stat. 333	Judge of the United States District Court for the District of Delaware; 1985–2010	Succeeded by Richard G. Andrews
Preceded by Joseph J. Longobardi	Chief Judge of the United States District Court for the District of Delaware; 1996–2000	Succeeded by Sue Lewis Robinson
