= Jane Richards Roth =

American judge (born 1935)

Jane Roth

Senior Judge of the United States Court of Appeals for the Third Circuit
- Incumbent
- Assumed office May 31, 2006

Judge of the United States Court of Appeals for the Third Circuit
- In office July 2, 1991 – May 31, 2006
- Appointed by: George H. W. Bush
- Preceded by: Collins J. Seitz
- Succeeded by: Kent A. Jordan

Judge of the United States District Court for the District of Delaware
- In office November 1, 1985 – July 22, 1991
- Appointed by: Ronald Reagan
- Preceded by: Walter King Stapleton
- Succeeded by: Sue Lewis Robinson

Personal details
- Born: June 16, 1935 (age 91) Philadelphia, Pennsylvania, U.S.
- Spouse: William Roth (m. 1965; died 2003)
- Education: Smith College (BA); Harvard University (LLB)

Jane Richards Roth (born June 16, 1935) is an American attorney and jurist serving as a Senior United States circuit judge of the United States Court of Appeals for the Third Circuit. She was previously a United States district judge of the United States District Court for the District of Delaware.

== Early life and education ==
Roth was born in Philadelphia, Pennsylvania. She received a Bachelor of Arts degree from Smith College in 1956 and a Bachelor of Laws from Harvard Law School in 1965.

At the time of her matriculation to Harvard Law School in 1962, Roth was one of 25 women in a class of 700-plus men. Erwin Griswold, then the Dean of Harvard Law School, invited the women to his home for dinner, and told them they were taking the place of 25 men who would otherwise have a future in the law. Ultimately, Roth was one of 23 women to graduate with 545 men.

== Career ==
Roth worked as a typist and administrative assistant in the United States Foreign Service from 1956 to 1962. She was stationed in Tehran, Iran from 1957 to 1959; Salisbury, Rhodesia in 1960; and Brazzaville, Republic of Congo from 1960 to 1962.

Roth was one of the first ten women to join the Delaware bar. She was in private practice in Wilmington, Delaware from 1965 to 1985, with the law firm of Richards, Layton & Finger.

== Federal judicial service ==
Roth was nominated by President Ronald Reagan on October 16, 1985, to a seat on the United States District Court for the District of Delaware vacated by Judge Walter King Stapleton. She was confirmed by the United States Senate on November 1, 1985, and received commission on November 4, 1985. Her service was terminated on July 22, 1991, due to elevation to the court of appeals.

Roth was nominated by President George H. W. Bush on May 16, 1991, to a seat on the United States Court of Appeals for the Third Circuit vacated by Judge Collins J. Seitz. She was confirmed by the United States Senate on June 27, 1991, and received commission on July 2, 1991. She assumed senior status on May 31, 2006.

Roth was inducted into the Hall of Fame of Delaware Women in 2013.

== Notable clerks ==
Roth's former law clerks include Chris Coons, United States Senator from Delaware; Lisa Monaco, United States Deputy Attorney General and former United States Homeland Security Advisor; Tomiko Brown-Nagin, Professor at Harvard Law School and Dean of the Radcliffe Institute for Advanced Study; Stephen W. Gauster, former Executive Vice President and General Counsel of MetLife; Adam J. Levitin, Professor at Georgetown University Law Center; Ingrid Wuerth, Professor at Vanderbilt Law School; J. Travis Laster, Vice Chancellor of the Delaware Court of Chancery; Charles S. Crompton, Judge of the San Francisco Superior Court; Sharon Bradford Franklin, Chair of the Privacy and Civil Liberties Oversight Board; Matthew Ahn, Visiting Professor at Cleveland State University College of Law; Seth Barrett Tillman, Associate Professor of Law at Maynooth University; and Andrew Dawson, Judge A. Jay Cristol Professor of Bankruptcy Law at the University of Miami School of Law. Howard Wasserman, writing in 2013, observed that at least twenty percent of Roth’s clerks to that point had entered academia, and suggested that she might be an example of an “academic feeder judge.”

== Notable cases ==
On July 3, 2019, Roth ruled that Amazon is responsible for product deficiencies.

== Personal life ==
Roth's husband was William Roth, the late United States Senator from Delaware who sponsored legislation creating the Roth IRA. They had two children, Katharine K. Roth and William V. Roth III. Her daughter Katherine died in 2014.

Legal offices
Preceded by Walter King Stapleton	Judge of the United States District Court for the District of Delaware; 1985–1991	Succeeded by Sue Lewis Robinson
Preceded by Collins J. Seitz	Judge of the United States Court of Appeals for the Third Circuit; 1991–2006	Succeeded by Kent A. Jordan
