= Leonard Eugene Wales =

American judge (1823–1897)

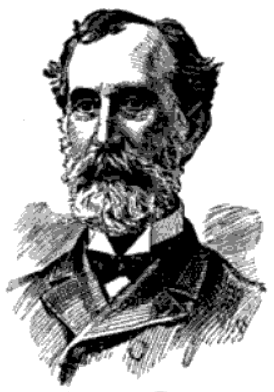

Judge of the United States District Court for the District of Delaware
- In office March 20, 1884 – February 8, 1897
- Appointed by: Chester A. Arthur
- Preceded by: Edward Green Bradford
- Succeeded by: Edward Green Bradford II

Personal details
- Born: November 26, 1823 Wilmington, Delaware
- Died: February 8, 1897 (aged 73) Wilmington, Delaware
- Education: Yale University read law

Leonard Eugene Wales (November 26, 1823 – February 8, 1897) was a United States district judge of the United States District Court for the District of Delaware.

== Education and career ==
Born in Wilmington, Delaware, Wales graduated from Yale University in 1845, where he was a member of Skull and Bones, and then read law to enter the bar in 1848. He was an editor of the Delaware State Journal in Wilmington from 1848 to 1850, and a clerk of the United States district court and United States circuit court for the District of Delaware from 1849 to 1864. He was also city solicitor for the City of Wilmington from 1853 to 1854. During the American Civil War, he was a Second Lieutenant in the United States Army in the First Delaware Volunteers, in 1861. Wales served as a Judge of the Superior Court of Delaware from 1864 to 1884.

== Federal judicial service ==
Wales was nominated by President Chester A. Arthur on March 6, 1884, to a seat on the United States District Court for the District of Delaware vacated by Judge Edward Green Bradford. He was confirmed by the United States Senate on March 20, 1884, and received his commission the same day. His service terminated on February 8, 1897, due to his death in Wilmington.

== Sources ==
Legal offices
Preceded by Edward Green Bradford	Judge of the United States District Court for the District of Delaware; 1884–1897	Succeeded by Edward Green Bradford II
