= List of federal judges appointed by Herbert Hoover =

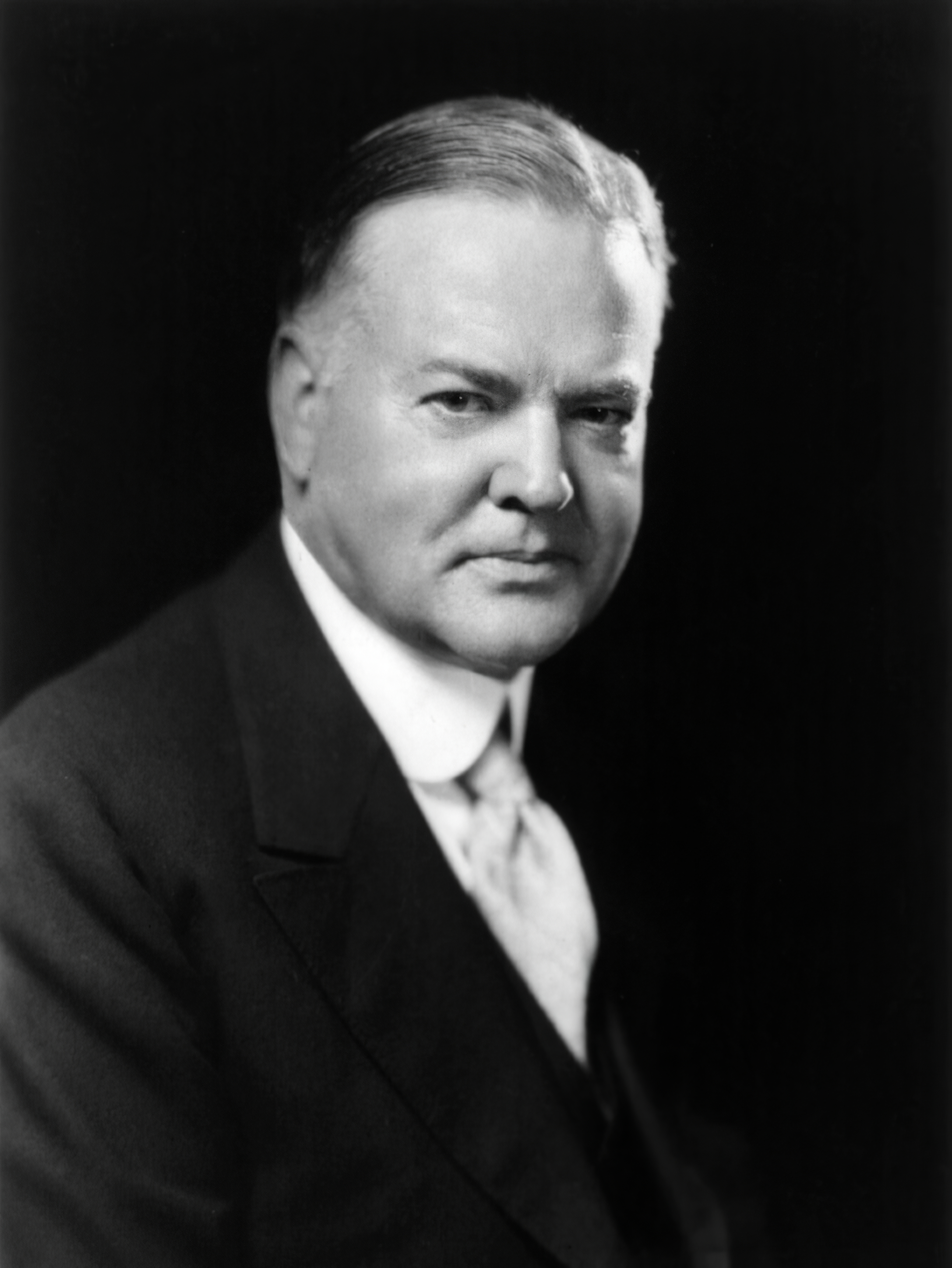
President Herbert Hoover.

Following is a list of all Article III United States federal judges appointed by President Herbert Hoover during his presidency. In total Hoover appointed 63 Article III federal judges: three Justices to the Supreme Court of the United States (including one chief justice), 16 judges to the United States Courts of Appeals, and 44 judges to the United States district courts.

Additionally, 7 Article I federal judge appointments are listed, including 1 judge to the United States Court of Customs and Patent Appeals, 3 judges to the United States Court of Claims and 3 judges to the United States Customs Court.

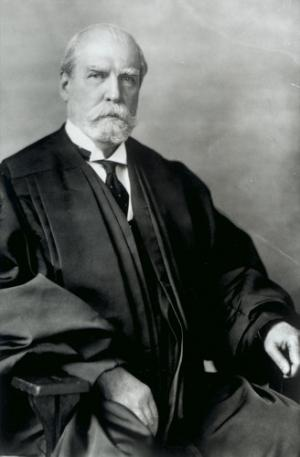
Charles Evans Hughes was Hoover's pick for Chief Justice.

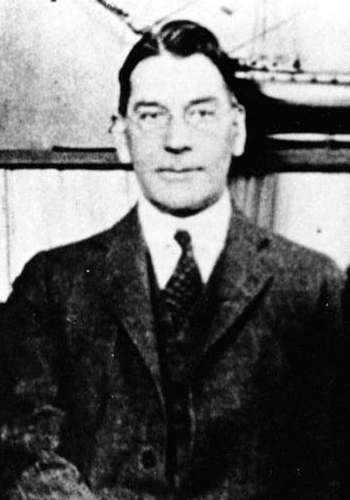
One of Hoover's first appellate court appointees, Curtis D. Wilbur had previously been nominated to the United States Court of Appeals for the Ninth Circuit by President Calvin Coolidge, but the nomination was not acted on before the end of Coolidge's presidency.

== United States Supreme Court justices ==
#	Justice	Seat	State	Former justice	Nomination date	Confirmation date	Began active service	Ended active service	Ended retired service
1	Charles Evans Hughes	Chief	New York	William Howard Taft	February 3, 1930	February 13, 1930	February 13, 1930	June 30, 1941	August 27, 1948
2	Owen Roberts	8	Pennsylvania	Edward Terry Sanford	May 9, 1930	May 20, 1930	May 20, 1930	July 31, 1945	–
3	Benjamin N. Cardozo	2	New York	Oliver Wendell Holmes Jr.	February 15, 1932	February 24, 1932	March 2, 1932	July 9, 1938	–

== Courts of appeals ==
#	Judge	Circuit	Nomination date	Confirmation date	Began active service	Ended active service	Ended senior status
1	Orie Leon Phillips	Tenth	April 18, 1929 (Note: Previously nominated by President Coolidge on March 1, 1929. That nomination expired at the end of the term. Renominated by President Hoover on April 18, 1929.)	April 29, 1929	April 29, 1929	January 1, 1956	November 14, 1974
2	George Thomas McDermott	Tenth	April 18, 1929	April 29, 1929	April 30, 1929	January 19, 1937	–
3	Curtis D. Wilbur	Ninth	April 18, 1929	May 2, 1929	May 2, 1929	May 10, 1945	September 8, 1954
4	Archibald K. Gardner	Eighth	April 18, 1929	May 23, 1929	May 23, 1929	September 30, 1960	January 21, 1962
5	Scott Wilson	First	September 9, 1929	October 2, 1929	October 2, 1929	March 31, 1940	October 22, 1942
6	William Morris Sparks	Seventh	October 25, 1929	October 31, 1929	October 31, 1929	November 13, 1948	January 7, 1950
7	Samuel Hale Sibley	Fifth	December 20, 1930	January 13, 1931	January 24, 1931	October 1, 1949	October 13, 1958
8	Joseph Chappell Hutcheson Jr.	Fifth	December 20, 1930	January 13, 1931	January 26, 1931	November 4, 1964	January 18, 1973
9	William Henry Sawtelle	Ninth	January 8, 1931	January 22, 1931	January 29, 1931	December 17, 1934	–
10	Joseph Whitaker Thompson	Third	December 4, 1930	January 22, 1931	January 29, 1931	May 1, 1938	January 7, 1946
11	William Hitz	D.C.	January 5, 1931	January 28, 1931	February 6, 1931	July 3, 1935	–
12	Duncan Lawrence Groner	D.C.	January 5, 1931	February 10, 1931	February 21, 1931	December 7, 1937	–
13	Morris Ames Soper	Fourth	December 15, 1931	January 12, 1932	May 6, 1931	June 2, 1955	March 11, 1963
14	James Madison Morton Jr.	First	December 15, 1931	January 6, 1932	January 9, 1932	September 30, 1939	June 26, 1940
15	John B. Sanborn Jr.	Eighth	December 19, 1931	January 19, 1932	January 23, 1932	June 30, 1959	March 7, 1964
16	Charles C. Simons	Sixth	January 8, 1932	January 26, 1932	January 29, 1932	September 15, 1959	February 2, 1964

== District courts ==
#	Judge	Court (Note: See List of United States district and territorial courts)	Nomination date	Confirmation date	Began active service	Ended active service	Ended senior status
1	Clarence G. Galston	E.D.N.Y.	April 18, 1929	April 29, 1929	April 29, 1929	January 1, 1957	January 22, 1964
2	John M. Woolsey	S.D.N.Y.	April 18, 1929 (Note: Previously nominated by President Coolidge on February 28, 1929. Renominated by President Hoover on April 18, 1929.)	April 29, 1929	April 29, 1929	December 31, 1943	May 4, 1945
3	John Lyles Glenn Jr.	E.D.S.C. W.D.S.C.	April 18, 1929	April 29, 1929	April 29, 1929	May 2, 1938	–
4	Francis Gordon Caffey	S.D.N.Y.	April 18, 1929	April 29, 1929	April 30, 1929	October 31, 1947	September 20, 1951
5	Alfred Conkling Coxe Jr.	S.D.N.Y.	April 18, 1929	April 29, 1929	May 1, 1929	January 31, 1951	December 21, 1957
6	Alfred Adams Wheat	D.D.C.	April 18, 1929 (Note: Previously nominated by President Coolidge on February 28, 1929 to the Eastern District of New York. That nomination expired at the end of the term. Renominated on April 18, 1929 by President Hoover to the District Court for the District of Columbia.)	May 3, 1929	May 3, 1929	June 4, 1930	Elevated
6.1	Alfred Adams Wheat	D.D.C.	May 14, 1930	June 4, 1930	June 4, 1930	December 31, 1941	May 11, 1943
7	Alfred Lee Wyman	D.S.D.	April 18, 1929	May 10, 1929	May 10, 1929	December 15, 1953	–
8	John Boyd Avis	D.N.J.	September 9, 1929	October 2, 1929	October 2, 1929	January 21, 1944	–
9	Mortimer W. Byers	E.D.N.Y.	September 9, 1929	November 20, 1929	November 20, 1929	February 1, 1960	March 5, 1962
10	Albert Leisenring Watson	M.D. Pa.	June 8, 1929 (Note: Renominated on September 9, 1929.)	December 17, 1929	December 17, 1929	May 31, 1955	December 20, 1960
11	Richard Joseph Hopkins	D. Kan.	October 17, 1929	December 19, 1929	December 19, 1929	August 28, 1943	–
12	George Cosgrave	S.D. Cal.	March 12, 1930	April 8, 1930	April 8, 1930	August 31, 1940	August 4, 1945
13	Robert P. Patterson	S.D.N.Y.	April 24, 1930	May 13, 1930	May 13, 1930	March 22, 1939	Elevated
14	Jesse C. Adkins	D.D.C.	June 6, 1930	June 17, 1930	June 17, 1930	October 15, 1946	March 29, 1955
15	Oscar Raymond Luhring	D.D.C.	June 23, 1930	July 3, 1930	July 3, 1930	August 18, 1944	–
16	John Percy Nields	D. Del.	June 20, 1930	July 3, 1930	July 3, 1930	September 30, 1941	August 26, 1943
17	Joseph Winston Cox	D.D.C.	June 23, 1930	July 1, 1930	July 7, 1930	September 9, 1939	–
18	Randolph Bryant	E.D. Tex.	December 3, 1930	January 13, 1931	January 24, 1931	April 24, 1951	–
19	Carroll C. Hincks	D. Conn.	December 15, 1930	January 13, 1931	January 24, 1931	December 7, 1953	Elevated
20	Thomas Martin Kennerly	S.D. Tex.	January 24, 1931	February 4, 1931	February 7, 1931	August 29, 1954	July 29, 1962
21	Albert Morris Sames	D. Ariz.	January 29, 1931	February 6, 1931	February 21, 1931	April 1, 1946	March 16, 1958
22	Charles Brents Kennamer	M.D. Ala. N.D. Ala.	January 24, 1931	February 20, 1931	February 25, 1931	June 3, 1955; June 5, 1936	– –
23	James McPherson Proctor	D.D.C.	February 6, 1931	February 25, 1931	March 2, 1931	March 5, 1948	Elevated
24	Louie Willard Strum	S.D. Fla.	February 21, 1931	February 28, 1931	March 2, 1931	October 3, 1950	Elevated
25	Emory Marvin Underwood	N.D. Ga.	February 7, 1931	February 25, 1931	March 2, 1931	March 5, 1948	August 28, 1960
26	Harry Aaron Hollzer	S.D. Cal.	January 8, 1931	February 27, 1931	March 3, 1931	January 14, 1946	–
27	John P. Barnes	N.D. Ill.	February 26, 1931	March 2, 1931	March 4, 1931	September 15, 1957	December 31, 1958
28	Ernest Aloysius O'Brien	E.D. Mich.	February 26, 1931	March 2, 1931	March 4, 1931	October 9, 1948	–
29	Luther B. Way	E.D. Va.	February 21, 1931	March 2, 1931	March 4, 1931	October 23, 1943	–
30	Gunnar Nordbye	D. Minn.	February 20, 1931 (Note: Renominated on December 16, 1931.)	February 3, 1932	March 18, 1931	March 6, 1967	November 5, 1977
31	James Alger Fee	D. Ore.	February 26, 1931 (Note: Renominated on December 15, 1931.)	December 22, 1931	March 18, 1931	April 30, 1954	Elevated
32	John Knight	W.D.N.Y.	December 15, 1931	January 6, 1932	March 18, 1931	June 15, 1955	–
33	F. Dickinson Letts	D.D.C.	December 15, 1931	February 17, 1932	May 5, 1931	May 31, 1961	January 19, 1965
34	William Calvin Chesnut	D. Md.	December 15, 1931	January 12, 1932	May 9, 1931	July 31, 1953	October 16, 1962
35	Daniel William O'Donoghue	D.D.C.	December 15, 1931	January 26, 1932	October 28, 1931	October 31, 1946	June 29, 1948
36	John Paul Jr.	W.D. Va.	December 15, 1931	January 11, 1932	January 14, 1932	August 1, 1958	February 13, 1964
37	Robert Johnston McMillan	W.D. Tex.	December 15, 1931	January 12, 1932	January 19, 1932	October 27, 1941	–
38	Charles Guy Briggle	S.D. Ill.	January 8, 1932	January 20, 1932	January 25, 1932	August 1, 1958	June 6, 1972
39	Hugh Dean McLellan	D. Mass.	January 18, 1932	February 3, 1932	February 10, 1932	September 30, 1941	–
40	Matthew M. Joyce	D. Minn.	January 28, 1932	February 3, 1932	February 11, 1932	October 11, 1954	January 12, 1956
41	George Austin Welsh	E.D. Pa.	April 14, 1932	May 19, 1932	May 20, 1932	August 29, 1957	October 22, 1970
42	Phillip Forman	D.N.J.	June 11, 1932	June 23, 1932	June 25, 1932	September 20, 1959	Elevated
43	George E. Q. Johnson	N.D. Ill.	December 7, 1932	–	August 3, 1932	March 3, 1933	–

== Specialty courts (Article I) ==
=== United States Court of Customs and Patent Appeals ===
#	Judge	Nomination date	Confirmation date	Began active service	Ended active service	Ended senior status
1	Irvine Lenroot	April 22, 1929 (Note: Previously nominated by President Coolidge on February 14, 1929. That nomination expired at the end of the term. Renominated by President Hoover on April 22, 1929.)	May 17, 1929	May 17, 1929	April 30, 1944	–

=== United States Court of Claims ===
#	Judge	Nomination date	Confirmation date	Began active service	Ended active service	Ended senior status
1	Thomas Sutler Williams	October 17, 1929	November 1, 1929	November 1, 1929	April 5, 1940	–
2	Benjamin Horsley Littleton	October 17, 1929	November 6, 1929	November 6, 1929	October 31, 1958	July 6, 1966
3	Richard S. Whaley	May 23, 1930	June 2, 1930	June 2, 1930	June 27, 1939	–

=== United States Customs Court ===
#	Judge	Nomination date	Confirmation date	Began active service	Ended active service	Ended senior status
1	David Hayes Kincheloe	December 4, 1930	January 22, 1931	September 22, 1930	April 30, 1948	–
2	Walter Howard Evans	January 28, 1931	February 14, 1931	February 23, 1931	May 31, 1941	–
3	Frederick W. Dallinger	June 20, 1932	June 28, 1932	July 8, 1932	October 31, 1942	–

== Notes ==
Renominations

== Sources ==
- Federal Judicial Center
