= Samuel Hale Sibley =

American judge (1873–1958)

Senior Judge of the United States Court of Appeals for the Fifth Circuit
- In office October 1, 1949 – October 13, 1958

Judge of the United States Court of Appeals for the Fifth Circuit
- In office January 24, 1931 – October 1, 1949
- Appointed by: Herbert Hoover
- Preceded by: Richard Wilde Walker Jr.
- Succeeded by: Robert Lee Russell

Judge of the United States District Court for the Northern District of Georgia
- In office August 5, 1919 – January 30, 1931
- Appointed by: Woodrow Wilson
- Preceded by: Seat established by 40 Stat. 1156
- Succeeded by: Emory Marvin Underwood

Personal details
- Born: Samuel Hale Sibley; July 2, 1873 Union Point, Georgia
- Died: October 13, 1958 (aged 85)
- Parent: Jennie Hart Sibley (mother)
- Education: University of Georgia (AB); University of Georgia School of Law (LLB)

Samuel Hale Sibley (July 2, 1873 – October 13, 1958) was a United States circuit judge of the United States Court of Appeals for the Fifth Circuit and previously was a United States district judge of the United States District Court for the Northern District of Georgia.

== Education and career ==
Born in Union Point, Georgia, Sibley received an Artium Baccalaureus degree from the University of Georgia in 1892 and a Bachelor of Laws from the University of Georgia School of Law in 1893. He entered private practice in Union Point, and became a judge of the Greene County Court from 1905 to 1912, and of the City Court of Greensboro from 1912 to 1917. He was a district attorney of the Georgia Railroad from 1917 to 1919.

== Federal judicial service ==
Sibley was nominated by President Woodrow Wilson on July 31, 1919, to the United States District Court for the Northern District of Georgia, to a new seat authorized by 40 Stat. 1156. He was confirmed by the United States Senate on August 5, 1919, and received his commission the same day. His service terminated on January 30, 1931, due to his elevation to the Fifth Circuit.

Sibley was nominated by President Herbert Hoover on December 20, 1930, to a seat on the United States Court of Appeals for the Fifth Circuit vacated by Judge Richard Wilde Walker Jr. He was confirmed by the Senate on January 13, 1931, and received his commission on January 24, 1931. He was a member of the Conference of Senior Circuit Judges (now the Judicial Conference of the United States) from 1942 to 1947. He assumed senior status on October 1, 1949. His service terminated on October 13, 1958, due to his death.

== Sources ==
Legal offices
Preceded by Seat established by 40 Stat. 1156	Judge of the United States District Court for the Northern District of Georgia; 1919–1931	Succeeded by Emory Marvin Underwood
Preceded by Richard Wilde Walker Jr.	Judge of the United States Court of Appeals for the Fifth Circuit; 1931–1949	Succeeded by Robert Lee Russell
