= Amos Jordan =

American professor (1922–2018)

Amos "Joe" Jordan
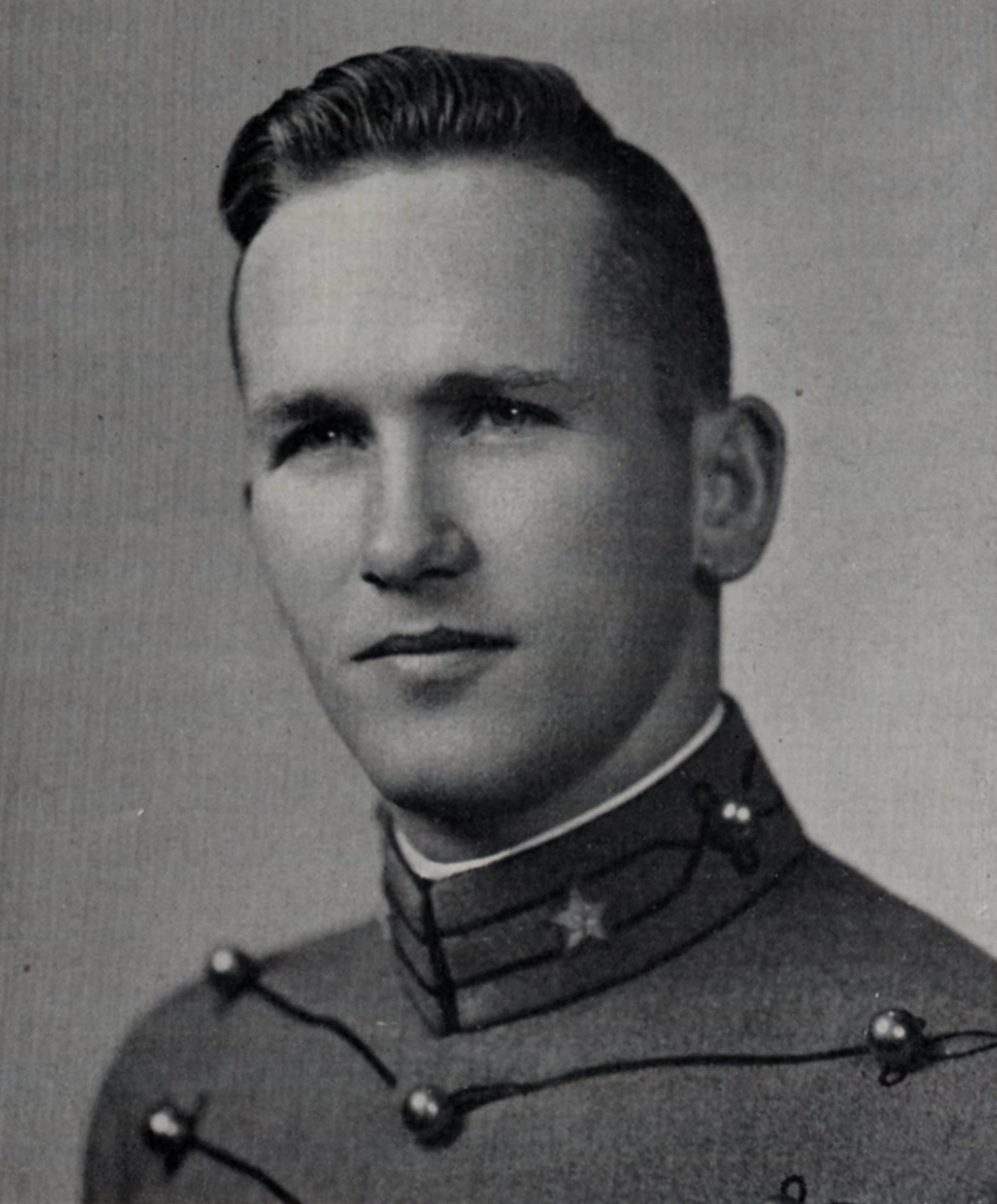
- Jordan as a United States Military Academy cadet c. 1946
- Born: Amos Azariah Jordan Jr. February 11, 1922; Twin Falls, Idaho, U.S.
- Died: June 7, 2018 (aged 96); Bountiful, Utah, U.S.
- Occupation: Professor
- Children: David J. Jordan, Kent A. Jordan

Amos Azariah "Joe" Jordan Jr. (February 11, 1922 – June 7, 2018) was an American brigadier general in the United States Army and senior fellow at the Wheatley Institution of Brigham Young University. He was formerly the CEO of the Center for Strategic and International Studies as well as a professor at the United States Military Academy.

== Biography ==
He was born in Twin Falls, Idaho and was a member of the Church of Jesus Christ of Latter-day Saints and resided in Bountiful, Utah. He died at age 96 on June 7, 2018.

Jordan received his bachelor's degree from the United States Military Academy (West Point), graduating in the class of 1946. During his senior year at West Point, he served as the "First Captain"—the academy's senior ranking cadet.

His skills as a boxer were well known and was headed to an Olympic bid that was only thwarted by his girlfriend - later, his wife - who told him his brain was too exceptional to be banged around in his skull. Jordan, under the threat of losing her, agreed to not box anymore. However, later in life, he could be seen sparring with his grandchildren in the backyard of their home in Virginia.

He then was a Rhodes Scholar at the University of Oxford where he received both a bachelor's and master's degree. While at Oxford, Jordan was a member of the Oxford University basketball team. He received a Ph.D. in international affairs from Columbia University. His doctoral dissertation was on foreign aid and South-east Asian defense.

== Career ==
After serving in the U.S. Eighth Army and the U.S. Economic Aid Commission to Korea from 1954 to 1955, Jordan returned to West Point as Professor of Social Sciences and subsequently became head of the academy's political science and economics programs. During his tenure at West Point, he was borrowed to serve as the Special Political Advisor to the U.S. Ambassador to India (1963–1964) and later spent a sabbatical as the Deputy Assistant Secretary of Defense for International Security Affairs. During his 17 years as an academy professor, Jordan was periodically detailed to special assignments to the White House, the Secretary of Defense, and the Commander of U.S. Forces in Vietnam.

He retired from military service in 1972 as a Brigadier General to become Director of the Aspen Institute. Two years later, he was back in government as Principal Deputy Assistant Secretary of Defense for International Security Affairs. In 1976, he became Deputy Undersecretary and Acting Undersecretary of State. He left government in 1977 to join the Center for Strategic and International Studies.

Jordan has been a consultant to the National Security Council, the Agency for International Development and other public and private organizations and has served on several presidential commissions and governmental study groups. He has also served as International Co-chairman of the Council for Security Cooperation in the Asia Pacific (CSCAP) and co-chairman of the Korean-American Wisemen Council. From 1989 to 1993, he was a member of the President's Intelligence Oversight Board. He was also on the Board of Directors of CSIS, the U.S. Committee of CSCAP, and the Pacific Form, CSIS. He was a member of the Council of Foreign Relations, the Bretton Woods Committee, and the Pacific Council on International Policy.

He has written and lectured nationally and internationally on a variety of issues. His most widely used publication is "American National Security: Policy and Process", co-authored with Taylor and Mazarr. He also wrote "Facing the International Energy Problem: 1980 to 2000", in 1979 with Bryan and Moody.

== Family ==
Jordan and his wife, MarDeane "Polly" Carver, are the parents of six children, three boys and three girls. All three of his sons went into law. They are Judge Kent A. Jordan, David J. Jordan, former US Attorney for the District of Utah and who served as the President of the England London Mission of the Church of Jesus Christ of Latter-day Saints, and Keith L. Jordan, who served as a lawyer and state legislator in Tennessee. His oldest daughter, Peggy, married the Editor-in-Chief of The Christian Science Monitor, John Hughes. His second daughter, Diana, married a professor of business, named Dan, who left academia to work at a small company called PepsiCo. Linda, his youngest daughter, holds a PhD nursing and was a professor at the University of Utah and at Brigham Young University, and married a successful international businessman, also named Dan.

== Sources ==
- Biography
- Video Interview
- Deseret News, Jan. 11, 2010
- bibliography from Allbooks
- Wheatley Institution faculty bio
