= Emory Marvin Underwood =

American judge

Senior Judge of the United States District Court for the Northern District of Georgia
- In office March 5, 1948 – August 28, 1960

Judge of the United States District Court for the Northern District of Georgia
- In office March 2, 1931 – March 5, 1948
- Appointed by: Herbert Hoover
- Preceded by: Samuel Hale Sibley
- Succeeded by: Seat abolished

Personal details
- Born: Emory Marvin Underwood; December 11, 1877 Douglas County, Georgia
- Died: August 28, 1960 (aged 82)
- Education: Vanderbilt University (B.A.); Vanderbilt University Law School (LL.B.)

Emory Marvin Underwood (December 11, 1877 – August 28, 1960) was a United States district judge of the United States District Court for the Northern District of Georgia.

== Education and career ==
Born in Douglas County, Georgia, Underwood received a Bachelor of Arts degree from Vanderbilt University in 1900 and a Bachelor of Laws from Vanderbilt University Law School in 1902. He was in private practice in Atlanta, Georgia from 1903 to 1914, an Assistant Attorney General of the United States from 1914 to 1917, general counsel for the Seaboard Air Line Railroad from 1917 to 1919, and general solicitor for the United States Railroad Administration from 1919 to 1920. He returned to private practice in Atlanta from 1920 to 1931.

== Federal judicial service ==
On February 7, 1931, Underwood was nominated by President Herbert Hoover to a seat on the United States District Court for the Northern District of Georgia vacated by Judge Samuel Hale Sibley. Underwood was confirmed by the United States Senate on February 25, 1931, and received his commission on March 2, 1931. He assumed senior status on March 5, 1948. Underwood served in that capacity until his death August 28, 1960.

== Sources ==
Legal offices
Preceded by Samuel Hale Sibley	Judge of the United States District Court for the Northern District of Georgia; 1931–1948	Succeeded by Seat abolished
