= Hugh M. Morris =

American judge (1878–1966)

Judge of the United States District Court for the District of Delaware
- In office January 27, 1919 – June 30, 1930
- Appointed by: Woodrow Wilson
- Preceded by: Edward Green Bradford II
- Succeeded by: John Percy Nields

Personal details
- Born: Hugh Martin Morris; April 9, 1878 near Greenwood, Delaware
- Died: March 19, 1966 (aged 87) Wilmington, Delaware
- Party: Democratic
- Spouse: Emma Carter Smith
- Children: 1
- Education: Delaware College (B.A.) read law

Hugh Martin Morris (April 9, 1878 – March 19, 1966) was a United States district judge of the United States District Court for the District of Delaware.

== Early life and education ==
Born on April 9, 1878, near Greenwood, Delaware, to William W. Morris, a member of the Delaware House of Representatives from 1871 to 1873 and 1877 to 1879, and Mary Collison. Morris received a Bachelor of Arts degree in 1898 from Delaware College (now the University of Delaware) and read law in 1903. Morris served on the University of Delaware's Board of Trustees from 1928 to 1958, and was president of the board from 1838 to 1958.

== Career ==
Morris entered private practice in Wilmington, Delaware from 1903 to 1919. On January 17, 1919, he was nominated by President Woodrow Wilson to a seat on the United States District Court for the District of Delaware vacated by Judge Edward Green Bradford II. He was confirmed by the United States Senate on January 27, 1919, and received his commission the same day. His service terminated on June 30, 1930, due to his resignation.

== Later career and death ==
Following his resignation from the federal bench, Morris returned to private practice in Wilmington from 1930 to 1966. Despite years of failing health, he never retired from law, ultimately dying at his home in Wilmington, Delaware on March 19, 1966.

== Estate and legacy ==
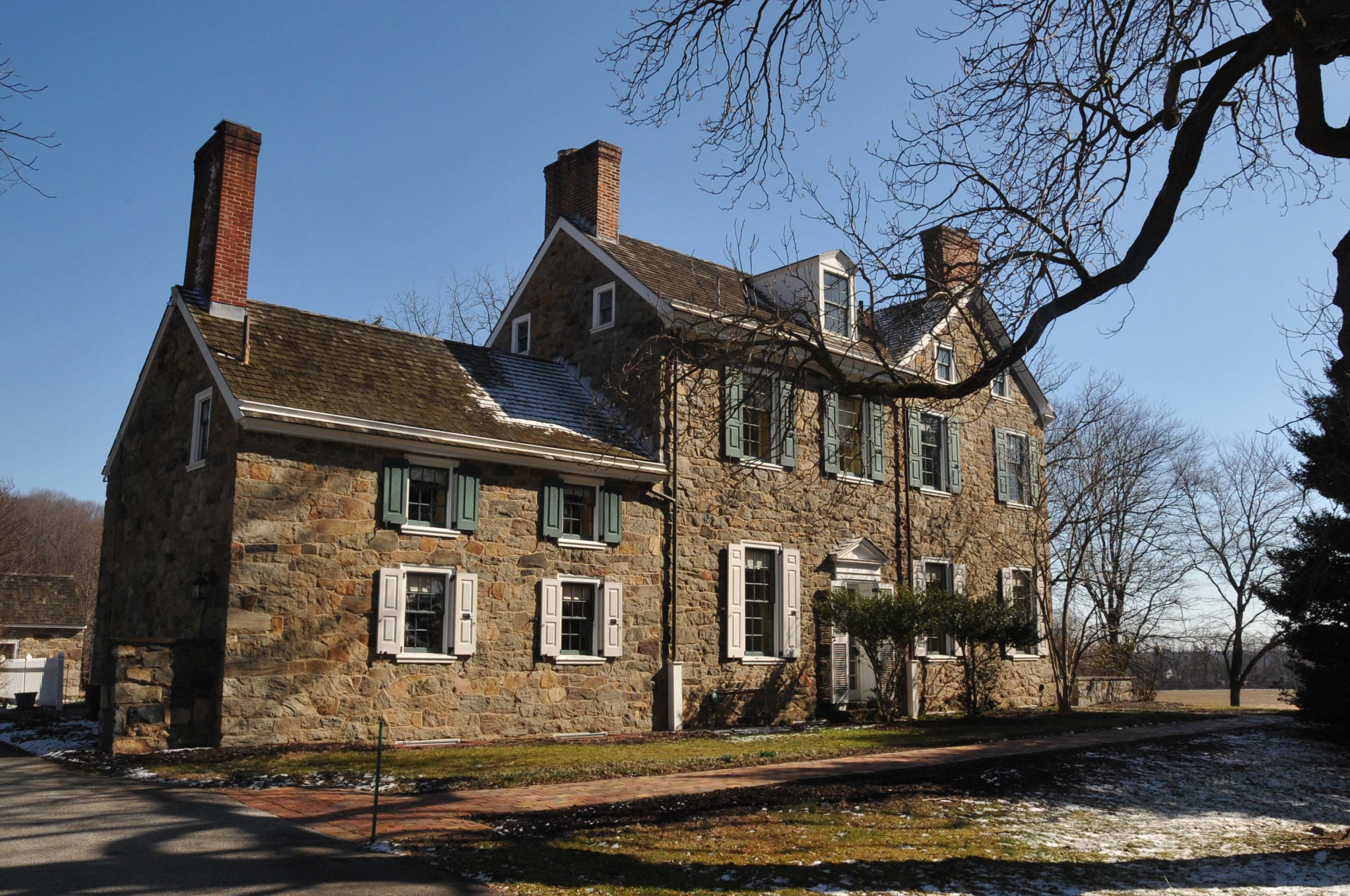
Morris Estate House in White Clay Creek State Park

Judge Morris' estate was purchased by the State of Delaware in 1998 and is part of the White Clay Creek State Park. Hugh M. Morris Library, the main campus library at the University of Delaware, is named in his honor.

Legal offices
| Preceded by Edward Green Bradford II | Judge of the United States District Court for the District of Delaware; 1919–1930 | Succeeded by John Percy Nields |
