= Caleb Merrill Wright =

American judge (1908–2001)

Senior Judge of the United States District Court for the District of Delaware
- In office October 8, 1973 – May 12, 2001

Chief Judge of the United States District Court for the District of Delaware
- In office 1957–1973
- Preceded by: Paul Conway Leahy
- Succeeded by: James Levin Latchum

Judge of the United States District Court for the District of Delaware
- In office July 27, 1955 – October 8, 1973
- Appointed by: Dwight D. Eisenhower
- Preceded by: Seat established by 68 Stat. 8
- Succeeded by: Murray Merle Schwartz

Personal details
- Born: Caleb Merrill Wright; October 7, 1908 Georgetown, Delaware
- Died: May 12, 2001 (aged 92)
- Education: University of Delaware (B.A.); Yale Law School (LL.B.)

Caleb Merrill Wright (October 7, 1908 – May 12, 2001) was a United States district judge of the United States District Court for the District of Delaware.

== Education and career ==
Born in Georgetown, Delaware, Wright received a Bachelor of Arts degree from the University of Delaware in 1930 and a Bachelor of Laws from Yale Law School in 1933. He was in private practice in Georgetown from 1933 to 1955, also serving as a deputy state attorney general of Delaware from 1935 to 1939 and an attorney to the Delaware Senate from 1938 to 1939, and to the Delaware General Assembly from 1940 to 1941.

== Federal judicial service ==
On July 1, 1955, Wright was nominated by President Dwight D. Eisenhower to a new seat on the United States District Court for the District of Delaware created by 68 Stat. 8. He was confirmed by the United States Senate on July 19, 1955, and received his commission on July 27, 1955. He served as Chief Judge from 1957 to 1973, assuming senior status on October 8, 1973. Wright's service was terminated on May 12, 2001, due to his death.

== See also ==
- List of United States federal judges by longevity of service

== Sources ==
Legal offices
Preceded by Seat established by 68 Stat. 8	Judge of the United States District Court for the District of Delaware; 1955–1973	Succeeded by Murray Merle Schwartz
Preceded by Paul Conway Leahy	Chief Judge of the United States District Court for the District of Delaware; 1957–1973	Succeeded by James Levin Latchum
