= United States District Court for the District of Delaware =

United States federal district court of Delaware

- (D. Del.)
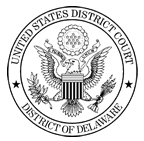

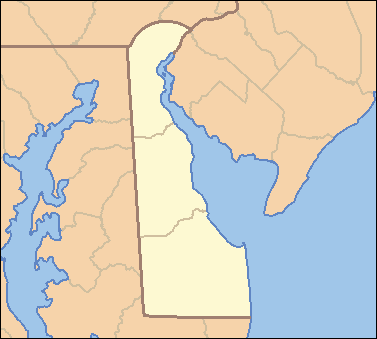
- Location: Wilmington
- Appeals to: Third Circuit
- Established: September 24, 1789
- Judges: 4
- Chief Judge: Colm Connolly

Officers of the court
- U.S. Attorney: Benjamin L. Wallace
- U.S. Marshal: Michael C. McGowan
- www.ded.uscourts.gov

The United States District Court for the District of Delaware (in case citations, D. Del.) is the Federal district court having jurisdiction over the entire state of Delaware. The Court sits in Wilmington.

Because Delaware is the state of incorporation for most major U.S. corporations, the District of Delaware hears and tries many patent and other complex commercial disputes that must be heard in federal court for diversity of citizenship reasons, and hears many appeals from bankruptcy disputes which are filed with the United States Bankruptcy Court for the District of Delaware.

Appeals from the Court are heard by the United States Court of Appeals for the Third Circuit, which sits in Philadelphia, Pennsylvania (except for patent claims and claims against the U.S. government under the Tucker Act, which are appealed to the Federal Circuit).

As of December 12, 2025, the United States attorney for the District of Delaware is Benjamin L. Wallace.

== History ==
The court was one of the original 13 courts established by the Judiciary Act of 1789, 1 Stat. 73, on September 24, 1789. From its establishment until 1946, the court had a single judge. A temporary additional judgeship was authorized on July 24, 1946, by 60 Stat. 654, and was made permanent on September 5, 1950, by 64 Stat. 578. A third judge was authorized on February 10, 1954, by 68 Stat. 8, and a fourth on July 10, 1984, by 98 Stat. 333.

== Current judges ==
As of January 4, 2024:

#	Title	Judge	Duty station	Born	Term of service			Appointed by
#	Title	Judge	Duty station	Born	Active	Chief	Senior	Appointed by
26	Chief Judge	Colm Connolly	Wilmington	1964	2018–present	2021–present	—	Trump
27	District Judge	Maryellen Noreika	Wilmington	1966	2018–present	—	—	Trump
28	District Judge	Gregory B. Williams	Wilmington	1969	2022–present	—	—	Biden
29	District Judge	Jennifer L. Hall	Wilmington	1976	2024–present	—	—	Biden
17	Senior Judge	Joseph J. Longobardi	inactive	1930	1984–1997	1989–1996	1997–present	Reagan
25	Senior Judge	Richard G. Andrews	Wilmington	1955	2011–2023	—	2023–present	Obama

== Former judges ==
#	Judge	Born–died	Active service	Chief Judge	Senior status	Appointed by	Reason for termination
1	Gunning Bedford Jr.	1747–1812	1789–1812	—	—	Washington	death
2	John Fisher	1771–1823	1812–1823	—	—	Madison	death
3	Willard Hall	1780–1875	1823–1871 (Note: Recess appointment; formally nominated on December 5, 1823, confirmed by the United States Senate on December 9, 1823, and received commission on December 9, 1823.)	—	—	Monroe	retirement
4	Edward Green Bradford	1819–1884	1871–1884	—	—	Grant	death
5	Leonard Eugene Wales	1823–1897	1884–1897	—	—	Arthur	death
6	Edward Green Bradford II	1848–1928	1897–1918	—	—	McKinley	retirement
7	Hugh M. Morris	1878–1966	1919–1930	—	—	Wilson	resignation
8	John Percy Nields	1868–1943	1930–1941	—	1941–1943	Hoover	death
9	Paul Conway Leahy	1904–1966	1942–1957	1948–1957	1957–1966	F. Roosevelt	death
10	Richard Seymour Rodney	1882–1963	1946–1957	—	1957–1963	Truman	death
11	Caleb Merrill Wright	1908–2001	1955–1973	1957–1973	1973–2001	Eisenhower	death
12	Caleb Rodney Layton III	1907–1988	1957–1968	—	1968–1988	Eisenhower	death
13	Edwin DeHaven Steel Jr.	1904–1986	1958–1969	—	1969–1986	Eisenhower	death
14	James Levin Latchum	1918–2004	1968–1983	1973–1983	1983–2004	L. Johnson	death
15	Walter King Stapleton	1934–2024	1970–1985	1983–1985	—	Nixon	elevation
16	Murray Merle Schwartz	1931–2013	1974–1989	1985–1989	1989–2013	Nixon	death
18	Joseph James Farnan Jr.	1945–present	1985–2010	1996–2000	—	Reagan	retirement
19	Jane Richards Roth	1935–present	1985–1991	—	—	Reagan	elevation
20	Sue Lewis Robinson	1952–present	1991–2017	2000–2007	2017	G.H.W. Bush	retirement
21	Roderick R. McKelvie	1946–present	1992–2002	—	—	G.H.W. Bush	resignation
22	Gregory M. Sleet	1951–present	1998–2017	2007–2014	2017–2018	Clinton	retirement
23	Kent A. Jordan	1957–present	2002–2006	—	—	G.W. Bush	elevation
24	Leonard P. Stark	1969–present	2010–2022	2014–2021	—	Obama	elevation

== Chief judges ==
Chief judges have administrative responsibilities with respect to their district court. Unlike the Supreme Court, where one justice is specifically nominated to be chief, the office of chief judge rotates among the district court judges. To be chief, a judge must have been in active service on the court for at least one year, be under the age of 65, and have not previously served as chief judge.

A vacancy is filled by the judge highest in seniority among the group of qualified judges. The chief judge serves for a term of seven years, or until age 70, whichever occurs first. The age restrictions are waived if no members of the court would otherwise be qualified for the position.

When the office was created in 1948, the chief judge was the longest-serving judge who had not elected to retire, on what has since 1958 been known as senior status, or declined to serve as chief judge. After August 6, 1959, judges could not become or remain chief after turning 70 years old. The current rules have been in operation since October 1, 1982.

== Succession of seats ==
Seat 1
Seat established on September 24, 1789 by 1 Stat. 73
Bedford, Jr.	1789–1812
Fisher	1812–1823
W. Hall	1823–1871
Bradford	1871–1884
Wales	1884–1897
Bradford II	1897–1918
Morris	1919–1930
Nields	1930–1941
Leahy	1942–1957
Steel, Jr.	1958–1969
Stapleton	1970–1985
Roth	1985–1991
Robinson	1991–2017
Connolly	2018–present

Seat 2
Seat established on July 24, 1946 by 60 Stat. 654 (temporary)
Seat made permanent on September 5, 1950 by 64 Stat. 578
Rodney	1946–1957
Layton III	1957–1968
Latchum	1968–1983
Longobardi	1984–1997
Sleet	1998–2017
Noreika	2018–present

Seat 3
Seat established on February 10, 1954 by 68 Stat. 8
Wright	1955–1973
Schwartz	1974–1989
McKelvie	1992–2002
Jordan	2002–2006
Stark	2010–2022
Williams	2022–present

Seat 4
Seat established on July 10, 1984 by 98 Stat. 333
Farnan, Jr.	1985–2010
Andrews	2011–2023
J. Hall	2024–present

== United States attorneys ==
U.S. Attorney		Term started	Term ended	Presidents served under
George Read II		1789	1816	George Washington and John Adams, Thomas Jefferson, and James Madison
George Read III		1816	1836	James Monroe, John Quincy Adams and Andrew Jackson
James A. Bayard Jr.		1837	1843	Martin Van Buren, William Henry Harrison, and John Tyler
William Horsey Rogers		1843	1849	John Tyler and James K. Polk
Perry Sheward Johnson		1849	1853	Zachary Taylor and Millard Fillmore
Thomas F. Bayard		1853	1855	Franklin Pierce
Daniel Moore Bates		1855	1861	Franklin Pierce and James Buchanan
Edward Green Bradford		1861	1866	Abraham Lincoln and Andrew Johnson
John Lockwood Pratt		1866	1869	Andrew Johnson
Anthony Higgins		1869	1876	Ulysses S. Grant
William Corbit Spruance		1876	1880	Ulysses S. Grant and Rutherford B. Hayes
John Cunningham Patterson		1880	1888	Rutherford B. Hayes, James Garfield, Chester A. Arthur, and Grover Cleveland
Alexander Bradshaw Cooper		1888	1891	Grover Cleveland and Benjamin Harrison
Beniah Watson		1891	1894	Benjamin Harrison and Grover Cleveland
Lewis Cass Vandergrift		1894	1899	Grover Cleveland and William McKinley
William Michael Byrne		1899	1903	William McKinley and Theodore Roosevelt
John Percy Nields		1903	1916	Theodore Roosevelt, William Howard Taft and Woodrow Wilson
Charles F. Curley		1916	1920	Woodrow Wilson
James H. Hughes, Jr.		1920	1924	Woodrow Wilson, Warren Harding, and Calvin Coolidge
David J. Reinhardt		1924	1927	Calvin Coolidge
Leonard E. Wales	Leonard_Eugene_Wales	1927	1935	Calvin Coolidge, Herbert Hoover and Franklin D. Roosevelt
John J. Morris, Jr.		1935	1939	Franklin D. Roosevelt
Charles Stewart Lynch		1939	1944	Franklin D. Roosevelt
John J. Morris, Jr.		1944	1948	Franklin D. Roosevelt and Harry Truman
William Marvel		1948	1953	Harry Truman
Leonard G. Hagner		1953	1961	Dwight D. Eisenhower
Alexander Greenfield		1961	1969	John F. Kennedy and Lyndon B. Johnson
F. L. Peter Stone		1969	1973	Richard Nixon
Ralph F. Keil		1973	1975	Richard Nixon and Gerald Ford
W. Laird Stabler Jr.		1975	1977	Gerald Ford
James W. Garvin, Jr.		1977	1981	Jimmy Carter
Joseph James Farnan Jr.		1981	1985	Ronald Reagan
William C. Carpenter, Jr.		1985	1993	Ronald Reagan and George H. W. Bush
Gregory M. Sleet	Gregory_M._Sleet,_U.S._District_Court_Judge	1993	1998	Bill Clinton
Carl Schnee		1999	2001	Bill Clinton
Colm Connolly		2001	2009	George W. Bush
Charles Oberly		2011	2018	Barack Obama and Donald Trump
David C. Weiss		2018	2025	Donald Trump and Joe Biden

== See also ==
- Courts of Delaware
- List of current United States district judges
- List of United States federal courthouses in Delaware
