= Richard Seymour Rodney =

American judge (1882–1963)

Senior Judge of the United States District Court for the District of Delaware
- In office January 1, 1957 – December 22, 1963

Judge of the United States District Court for the District of Delaware
- In office July 31, 1946 – January 1, 1957
- Appointed by: Harry S. Truman
- Preceded by: Seat established by 60 Stat. 654
- Succeeded by: Caleb Rodney Layton III

Personal details
- Born: Richard Seymour Rodney; October 10, 1882 New Castle, Delaware, U.S.
- Died: December 22, 1963 (aged 81)
- Education: read law

Richard Seymour Rodney (October 10, 1882 – December 22, 1963) was a justice of the Delaware Supreme Court, and later a United States district judge of the United States District Court for the District of Delaware.

== Education and career ==
Born in New Castle, Delaware, Rodney read law in 1906. He was a Delaware National Guard First Lieutenant from 1899 to 1913. He was in private practice of law in Wilmington, Delaware from 1906 to 1922. He was a Mayor of New Castle from 1911 to 1917. He was an associate justice of the Supreme Court of Delaware from 1922 to 1946.

== Federal judicial service ==
Rodney was nominated by President Harry S. Truman on July 25, 1946, to the United States District Court for the District of Delaware, to a new seat created by 60 Stat. 654. He was confirmed by the United States Senate on July 27, 1946, and received his commission on July 31, 1946. He assumed senior status on January 1, 1957. His service was terminated on December 22, 1963, due to his death.

== Sources ==
Legal offices
Preceded by Seat established by 60 Stat. 654	Judge of the United States District Court for the District of Delaware; 1946–1957	Succeeded by Caleb Rodney Layton III
