= Edward Green Bradford =

American judge (1819-1884)

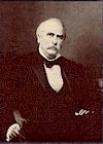

Judge of the United States District Court for the District of Delaware
- In office December 12, 1871 – January 16, 1884
- Appointed by: Ulysses S. Grant
- Preceded by: Willard Hall
- Succeeded by: Leonard Eugene Wales

Member of the Delaware House of Representatives
- In office 1849-1850

Personal details
- Born: Edward Green Bradford; July 17, 1819 Cecil County, Maryland
- Died: January 16, 1884 (aged 64) Wilmington, Delaware
- Children: Edward Green Bradford II
- Education: University of Delaware; Reading law

Edward Green Bradford (July 17, 1819 – January 16, 1884) was a Delaware politician and United States district judge of the United States District Court for the District of Delaware.

== Education and career ==
Born in Cecil County, Maryland, Bradford graduated from Delaware College (now the University of Delaware) in 1839 and read law to enter the bar in 1842. He was a deputy state attorney general in Dover, Delaware from 1842 to 1850, and a city solicitor for Wilmington, Delaware. In 1849, he was elected to the Delaware House of Representatives, returning to private practice in Wilmington the following year. In 1861, he was named United States Attorney for the District of Delaware, a post that he held until 1866.

== Federal judicial service ==
Bradford was nominated by President Ulysses S. Grant on December 11, 1871, to a seat on the United States District Court for the District of Delaware vacated by Judge Willard Hall. The following day, Bradford was confirmed by the United States Senate and received his commission. He served on the court until his death on January 16, 1884, in Wilmington.

== Family ==
Bradford married Mary Alicia Heyward (1820-1848), the granddaughter of Thomas Heyward Jr., a signer of the Declaration of Independence for South Carolina. Their son, Edward Green Bradford II, also became both a Delaware State Representative and federal judge. Their daughter, Elizabeth Canby Bradford, married Alexis Irénée du Pont Jr.

== Sources ==
Legal offices
Preceded by Willard Hall	Judge of the United States District Court for the District of Delaware; 1871–1884	Succeeded by Leonard Eugene Wales
