= James Levin Latchum =

American judge (1918–2004)

Senior Judge of the United States District Court for the District of Delaware
- In office December 23, 1983 – January 31, 2004

Chief Judge of the United States District Court for the District of Delaware
- In office 1973–1983
- Preceded by: Caleb Merrill Wright
- Succeeded by: Walter King Stapleton

Judge of the United States District Court for the District of Delaware
- In office August 3, 1968 – December 23, 1983
- Appointed by: Lyndon B. Johnson
- Preceded by: Caleb Rodney Layton III
- Succeeded by: Joseph J. Longobardi

Personal details
- Born: James Levin Latchum; December 23, 1918 Milford, Delaware
- Died: January 31, 2004 (aged 85)
- Education: Princeton University (A.B.); University of Virginia School of Law (LL.B.)

James Levin Latchum (December 23, 1918 – January 31, 2004) was a United States district judge of the United States District Court for the District of Delaware.

== Education and career ==
Born in Milford, Delaware, Latchum received an Artium Baccalaureus degree from Princeton University in 1940, and was a captain in the United States Army following World War II from 1940 to 1946. He received a Bachelor of Laws from the University of Virginia School of Law in 1946. He was a lieutenant colonel in the United States Army Reserve during World War II, from 1946 to 1961. He was in private practice in Wilmington, Delaware from 1946 to 1968. He was an attorney at the Delaware State Highway Department from 1949 to 1951. He was an Assistant United States Attorney of the District of Delaware from 1951 to 1953. He was an attorney at the Delaware Interstate Highway Division from 1955 to 1963. He was an attorney at the Delaware River and Bay Authority from 1963 to 1968.

== Federal judicial service ==
Latchum was nominated by President Lyndon B. Johnson on July 17, 1968, to a seat on the United States District Court for the District of Delaware vacated by Judge Caleb Rodney Layton III. He was confirmed by the United States Senate on August 2, 1968, and received his commission on August 3, 1968. He served as Chief Judge from 1973 to 1983. He assumed senior status on December 23, 1983. Latchum served in that capacity until his death on January 31, 2004.

== Personal ==
At the time of his death, Latchum had been married to Elizabeth Murray McArthur for 60 years.

== Sources ==
Legal offices
Preceded by Caleb Rodney Layton III	Judge of the United States District Court for the District of Delaware; 1968–1983	Succeeded by Joseph J. Longobardi
Preceded by Caleb Merrill Wright	Chief Judge of the United States District Court for the District of Delaware; 1973–1983	Succeeded by Walter King Stapleton
