= Paul Conway Leahy =

American judge

Senior Judge of the United States District Court for the District of Delaware
- In office October 7, 1957 – July 3, 1966

Chief Judge of the United States District Court for the District of Delaware
- In office 1948–1957
- Preceded by: Office established
- Succeeded by: Caleb Merrill Wright

Judge of the United States District Court for the District of Delaware
- In office January 14, 1942 – October 7, 1957
- Appointed by: Franklin D. Roosevelt
- Preceded by: John Percy Nields
- Succeeded by: Edwin DeHaven Steel Jr.

Personal details
- Born: Paul Conway Leahy; February 9, 1904 Wilmington, Delaware
- Died: July 3, 1966 (aged 62)
- Education: University of Delaware (BS); University of Pennsylvania (LLB)

Paul Conway Leahy (February 9, 1904 – July 3, 1966) was a United States district judge of the United States District Court for the District of Delaware.

== Education and career ==
Born in Wilmington, Delaware, Leahy received a Bachelor of Science degree from the University of Delaware in 1926 and a Bachelor of Laws from the University of Pennsylvania Law School in 1929. He was in private practice in Wilmington from 1929 to 1942.

== Federal judicial service ==
On December 23, 1941, Leahy was nominated by President Franklin D. Roosevelt to a seat on the United States District Court for the District of Delaware vacated by Judge John Percy Nields. Leahy was confirmed by the United States Senate on January 7, 1942, and received his commission on January 14, 1942. He served as Chief Judge from 1948 to 1957, assuming senior status due to a certified disability on October 7, 1957. Leahy served in that capacity until his death on July 3, 1966.

== Sources ==
Legal offices
Preceded by John Percy Nields	Judge of the United States District Court for the District of Delaware; 1942–1957	Succeeded by Edwin DeHaven Steel Jr.
Preceded by Office established	Chief Judge of the United States District Court for the District of Delaware; 1948–1957	Succeeded by Caleb Merrill Wright
