= Ernest Aloysius O'Brien =

American judge (1880–1948)

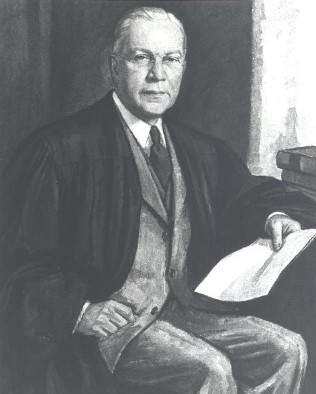
- Judicial portrait of Ernest Aloysius O'Brien, c. 1948.

Judge of the United States District Court for the Eastern District of Michigan
- In office March 4, 1931 – October 9, 1948
- Appointed by: Herbert Hoover
- Preceded by: Seat established by 46 Stat. 1197
- Succeeded by: Thomas Patrick Thornton

Personal details
- Born: Ernest Aloysius O'Brien; July 1, 1880 Detroit, Michigan
- Died: October 9, 1948 (aged 68)
- Education: Detroit College (B.A.); Detroit College of Law (LL.B.)

Ernest Aloysius O'Brien (July 1, 1880 – October 9, 1948) was a United States district judge of the United States District Court for the Eastern District of Michigan.

== Education and career ==
Born in Detroit, Michigan, O'Brien received a Bachelor of Arts degree from Detroit College (now University of Detroit Mercy) in 1898 and a Bachelor of Laws from Detroit College of Law (now Michigan State University College of Law) in 1905. He was in private practice in Detroit from 1906 to 1928. He was a Judge of the Circuit Court of Michigan in 1928, returning to private practice from 1928 to 1931.

== Federal judicial service ==
On February 26, 1931, O'Brien was nominated by President Herbert Hoover to a new seat on the United States District Court for the Eastern District of Michigan created by 46 Stat. 1197. He was confirmed by the United States Senate on March 2, 1931, and received his commission on March 4, 1931. O'Brien served in that capacity until his death on October 9, 1948.

== Sources ==
Legal offices
| Preceded by Seat established by 46 Stat. 1197 | Judge of the United States District Court for the Eastern District of Michigan; 1931–1948 | Succeeded by Thomas Patrick Thornton |
