= Kent A. Jordan =

American judge (born 1957)

Kent Jordan
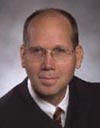

Judge of the United States Court of Appeals for the Third Circuit
- In office December 13, 2006 – January 15, 2025
- Appointed by: George W. Bush
- Preceded by: Jane Richards Roth
- Succeeded by: Jennifer Mascott

Judge of the United States District Court for the District of Delaware
- In office November 15, 2002 – December 15, 2006
- Appointed by: George W. Bush
- Preceded by: Roderick R. McKelvie
- Succeeded by: Leonard P. Stark

Personal details
- Born: Kent Amos Jordan; October 24, 1957 (age 69) West Point, New York, U.S.
- Party: Republican
- Parent: Amos Jordan (father)
- Relatives: David J. Jordan (brother)
- Education: Brigham Young University (BA); Georgetown University (JD)

Kent Amos Jordan (born October 24, 1957) is a former United States circuit judge of the United States Court of Appeals for the Third Circuit. He was previously a United States district judge of the United States District Court for the District of Delaware from 2002 to 2006.

== Early life ==
Jordan was born in West Point, New York, on October 24, 1957. Jordan is a member of the Church of Jesus Christ of Latter-day Saints and served as a missionary in Japan.

== Education and clerkship ==
Jordan completed his undergraduate studies at Brigham Young University in 1981 with a Bachelor of Arts degree (majoring in economics), and received his Juris Doctor from Georgetown University Law Center in 1984. Jordan clerked for Judge James L. Latchum on the United States District Court for the District of Delaware from 1984 to 1985.

== Legal background ==
Jordan was in private practice in Delaware from 1985 to 1987 and again from 1992 to 1997. In between, from 1987 to 1992, he worked for the United States Department of Justice as an Assistant United States Attorney for the District of Delaware. He also taught at the Widener University School of Law from 1995 to 1996 as an adjunct professor. He was vice president and general counsel for the Corporation Service Company from 1998 to 2002 in Wilmington, Delaware. Jordan currently teaches as an adjunct professor for the University of Pennsylvania Law School, Vanderbilt University Law School, and Widener University School of Law.

== Federal judicial service ==
Jordan was nominated to a vacancy on the United States District Court for the District of Delaware by President George W. Bush on July 25, 2002, and confirmed by the United States Senate on November 14, 2002, by voice vote. He received his commission on November 15, 2002. His service as a district court judge was terminated on December 15, 2006 when he was elevated to the court of appeals.

Four years later, Bush nominated Jordan to the Third Circuit on June 28, 2006, to fill a vacancy left by Judge Jane Richards Roth. He was confirmed to that court by a 91–0 vote on December 8, 2006 during the waning hours of the final lame duck session of the 109th Congress. He received his commission on December 13, 2006. He retired from judicial service on January 15, 2025.

Jordan's first precedential opinion for the Third Circuit was published on May 2, 2007. He authored the opinion for a unanimous three-judge panel in Eichorn v. AT&T II, an ERISA claims case. Judge Roth, whom Jordan was confirmed to replace, was a member of the panel.

Legal offices
Preceded by Roderick R. McKelvie	Judge of the United States District Court for the District of Delaware; 2002–2006	Succeeded by Leonard P. Stark
Preceded by Jane Richards Roth	Judge of the United States Court of Appeals for the Third Circuit; 2006–2025	Succeeded by Jennifer Mascott
