= John Percy Nields =

American judge

Senior Judge of the United States District Court for the District of Delaware
- In office September 30, 1941 – August 26, 1943

Judge of the United States District Court for the District of Delaware
- In office July 3, 1930 – September 30, 1941
- Appointed by: Herbert Hoover
- Preceded by: Hugh M. Morris
- Succeeded by: Paul Conway Leahy

United States Attorney for the District of Delaware
- In office 1903–1916
- President: Theodore Roosevelt; William Howard Taft; Woodrow Wilson
- Preceded by: William Michael Byrne
- Succeeded by: Charles F. Curley

Personal details
- Born: John Percy Nields; August 7, 1868 Wilmington, Delaware, U.S.
- Died: August 26, 1943 (aged 75) Nahant, Massachusetts, U.S.
- Education: Harvard University (AB, LLB)

Military service
- Branch/service: United States Army
- Unit: Ordnance Corps
- Battles/wars: World War II

John Percy Nields (August 7, 1868 – August 26, 1943) was a United States district judge of the United States District Court for the District of Delaware.

== Early life and education ==
Born in Wilmington, Delaware, Nields received an Artium Baccalaureus degree from Harvard College in 1889 and a Bachelor of Laws from Harvard Law School in 1892.

== Career ==
Nields worked in private practice in Wilmington from 1892 to 1903. He was the United States attorney for the District of Delaware from 1903 to 1916, thereafter returning to private practice in Wilmington in 1930. He was a captain in the United States Army Ordnance Corps during World War II in 1918.

=== Federal judicial service ===
On June 20, 1930, Nields was nominated by President Herbert Hoover to a seat on the United States District Court for the District of Delaware vacated by Judge Hugh M. Morris. Nields was confirmed by the United States Senate on July 3, 1930, and received his commission the same day. He assumed senior status on September 30, 1941, serving in that capacity until his death on August 26, 1943, in Nahant, Massachusetts.

== Sources ==
Legal offices
Preceded by Hugh M. Morris	Judge of the United States District Court for the District of Delaware; 1930–1941	Succeeded by Paul Conway Leahy
