= Walter King Stapleton =

American judge (1934–2024)

Walter Stapleton

Senior Judge of the United States Court of Appeals for the Third Circuit
- In office June 2, 1999 – November 23, 2024

Judge of the United States Court of Appeals for the Third Circuit
- In office April 4, 1985 – June 2, 1999
- Appointed by: Ronald Reagan
- Preceded by: Seat established by 98 Stat. 333
- Succeeded by: Thomas L. Ambro

Chief Judge of the United States District Court for the District of Delaware
- In office December 23, 1983 – May 8, 1985
- Preceded by: James Levin Latchum
- Succeeded by: Murray Merle Schwartz

Judge of the United States District Court for the District of Delaware
- In office October 14, 1970 – May 8, 1985
- Appointed by: Richard Nixon
- Preceded by: Edwin DeHaven Steel Jr.
- Succeeded by: Jane Richards Roth

Personal details
- Born: June 2, 1934 Cuthbert, Georgia, U.S.
- Died: November 23, 2024 (aged 90) Penn, Pennsylvania, U.S.
- Education: Princeton University (AB); Harvard University (LLB); University of Virginia (LLM)

Walter King Stapleton (June 2, 1934 – November 23, 2024) was a United States circuit judge of the United States Court of Appeals for the Third Circuit and a United States district judge of the United States District Court for the District of Delaware.

== Life and career ==
=== Early life and education ===
Stapleton was born in Cuthbert, Georgia on June 2, 1934. He received an Artium Baccalaureus degree from Princeton University in 1956. He received a Bachelor of Laws from Harvard Law School in 1959. He received a Master of Laws from University of Virginia School of Law in 1984. He was in private practice of law in Wilmington, Delaware from 1959 to 1970. He was a deputy attorney general of Delaware from 1963 to 1964.

=== Federal judicial service ===
Stapleton was nominated by President Richard Nixon on September 22, 1970, to a seat on the United States District Court for the District of Delaware vacated by Judge Edwin DeHaven Steel Jr. He was confirmed by the United States Senate on October 8, 1970, and received commission six days later. He served as Chief Judge from 1983 to 1985. His service was terminated on May 8, 1985, due to elevation to the Third Circuit.

Stapleton was nominated by President Ronald Reagan on March 27, 1985, to the United States Court of Appeals for the Third Circuit, to a new seat created by 98 Stat. 333. He was confirmed by the Senate on April 3, 1985, and received commission the following day. He assumed senior status on June 2, 1999. His service was terminated upon his death in 2024.

=== Death ===
Stapleton died in Penn, Pennsylvania on November 23, 2024, at the age of 90.

== See also ==
- List of United States federal judges by longevity of service

== Sources ==
Legal offices
Preceded by Edwin DeHaven Steel Jr.	Judge of the United States District Court for the District of Delaware; 1970–1985	Succeeded by Jane Richards Roth
Preceded by James Levin Latchum	Chief Judge of the United States District Court for the District of Delaware; 1983–1985	Succeeded by Murray Merle Schwartz
Preceded by Seat established by 98 Stat. 333	Judge of the United States Court of Appeals for the Third Circuit; 1985–1999	Succeeded by Thomas L. Ambro
