= Caleb Rodney Layton III =

American judge (1907–1988)

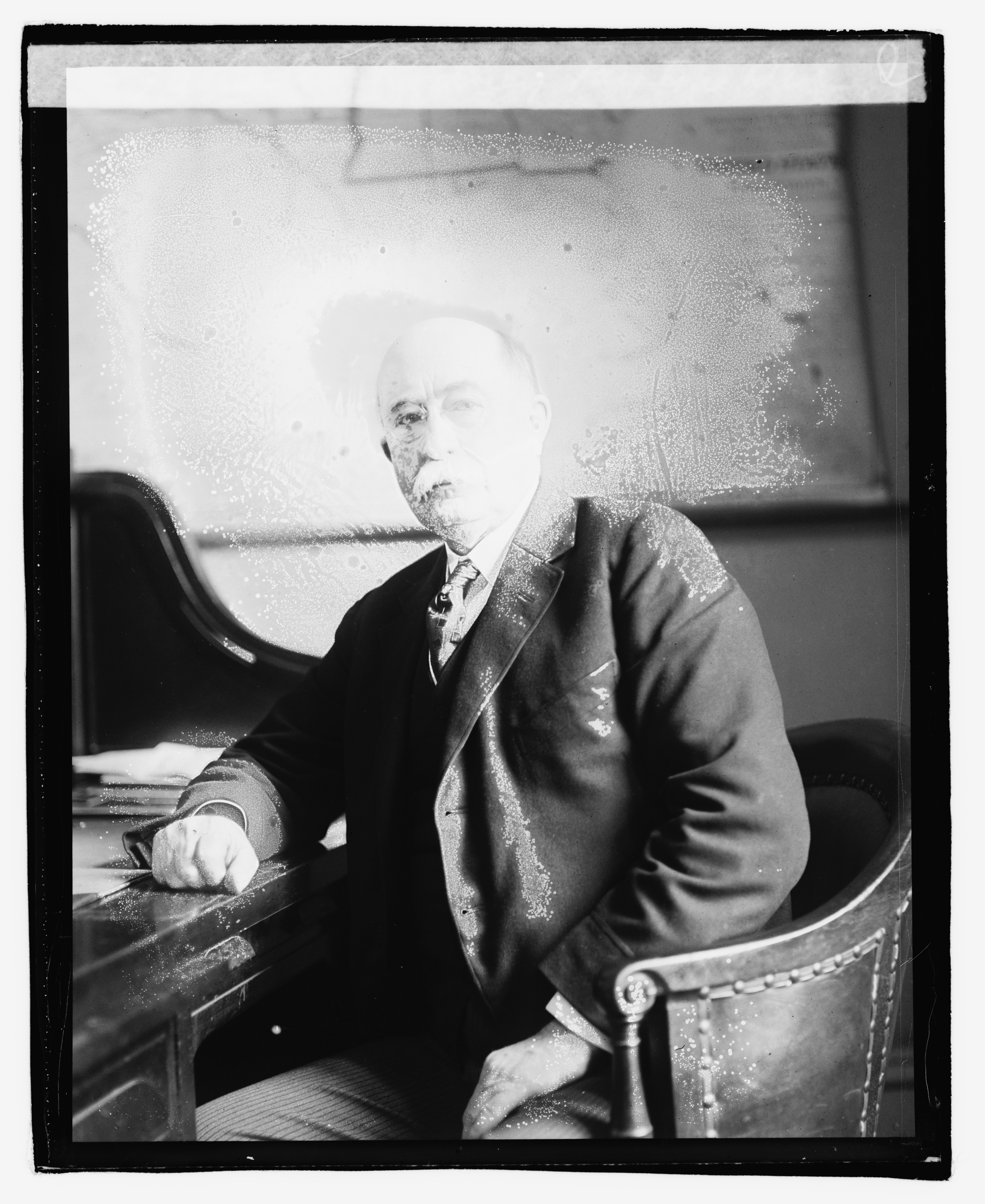

Senior Judge of the United States District Court for the District of Delaware
- In office April 26, 1968 – May 6, 1988

Judge of the United States District Court for the District of Delaware
- In office April 17, 1957 – April 26, 1968
- Appointed by: Dwight D. Eisenhower
- Preceded by: Richard Seymour Rodney
- Succeeded by: James Levin Latchum

Personal details
- Born: Caleb Rodney Layton III; July 4, 1907 Georgetown, Delaware
- Died: May 6, 1988 (aged 80)
- Education: Princeton University (A.B.); University of Pennsylvania Law School

Caleb Rodney Layton III (July 4, 1907 – May 6, 1988) was a United States district judge of the United States District Court for the District of Delaware.

== Education and career ==
Born in Georgetown, Delaware, Layton received an Artium Baccalaureus degree from Princeton University in 1930 and then attended the University of Pennsylvania Law School. He was a Judge of the Superior Court of Delaware from 1947 to 1957.

== Federal judicial service ==
Layton was nominated by President Dwight D. Eisenhower on March 25, 1957, to a seat on the United States District Court for the District of Delaware vacated by Judge Richard Seymour Rodney. He was confirmed by the United States Senate on April 16, 1957, and received his commission the next day. He assumed senior status due to a certified disability on April 26, 1968. His service terminated on May 6, 1988, due to his death.

== Sources ==
Legal offices
Preceded by Richard Seymour Rodney	Judge of the United States District Court for the District of Delaware; 1957–1968	Succeeded by James Levin Latchum
