= Majority leader =

Political position

A majority leader is the leader of a parliamentary group or party which constitutes a majority or plurality within a legislature in political systems where the legislature does not form the executive branch. They are commonly found in the legislatures of states which use a single-executive system of government.

In U.S. politics (as well as in some other countries utilizing the presidential system), the majority floor leader is a partisan position in a legislative body.

== United States ==
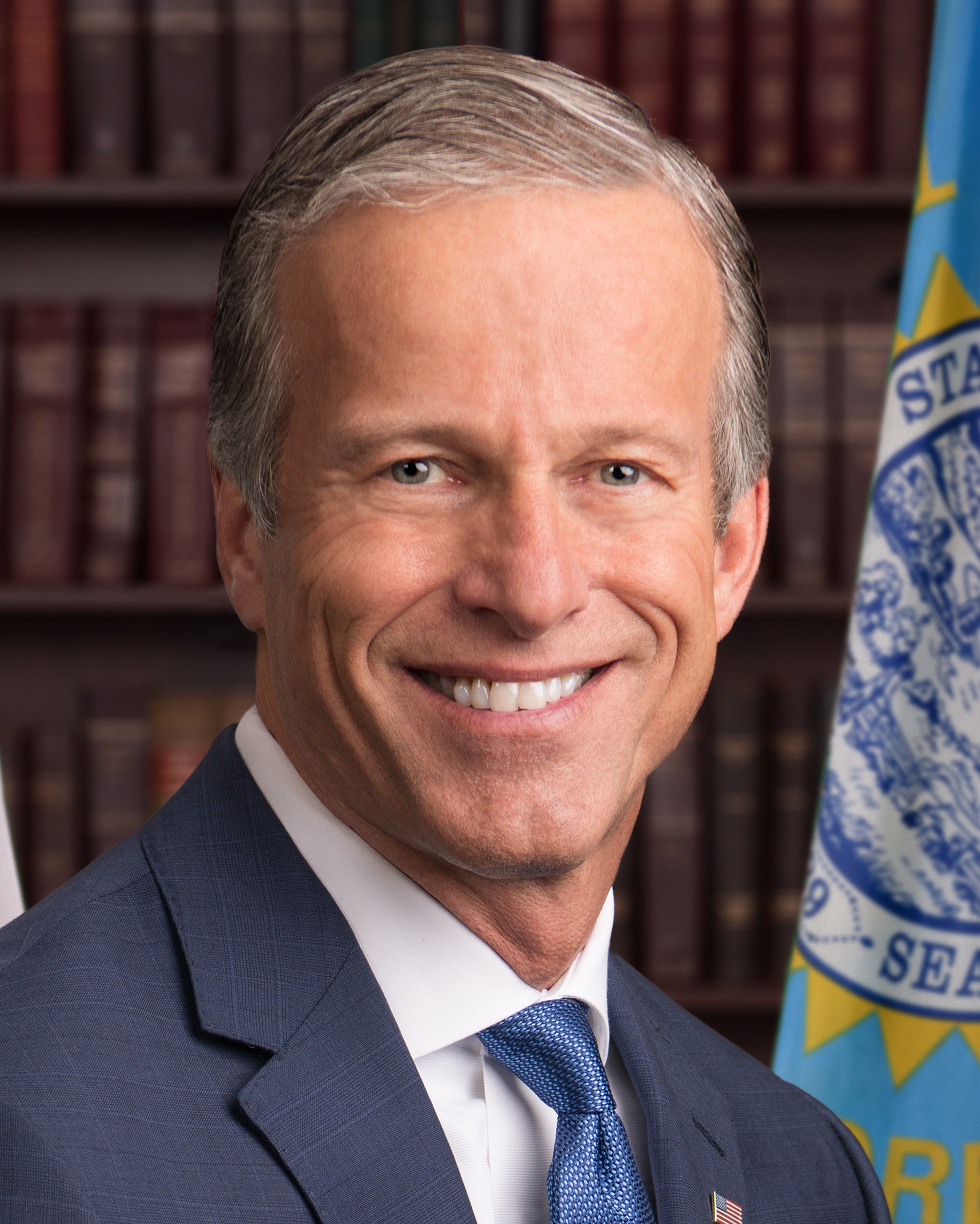
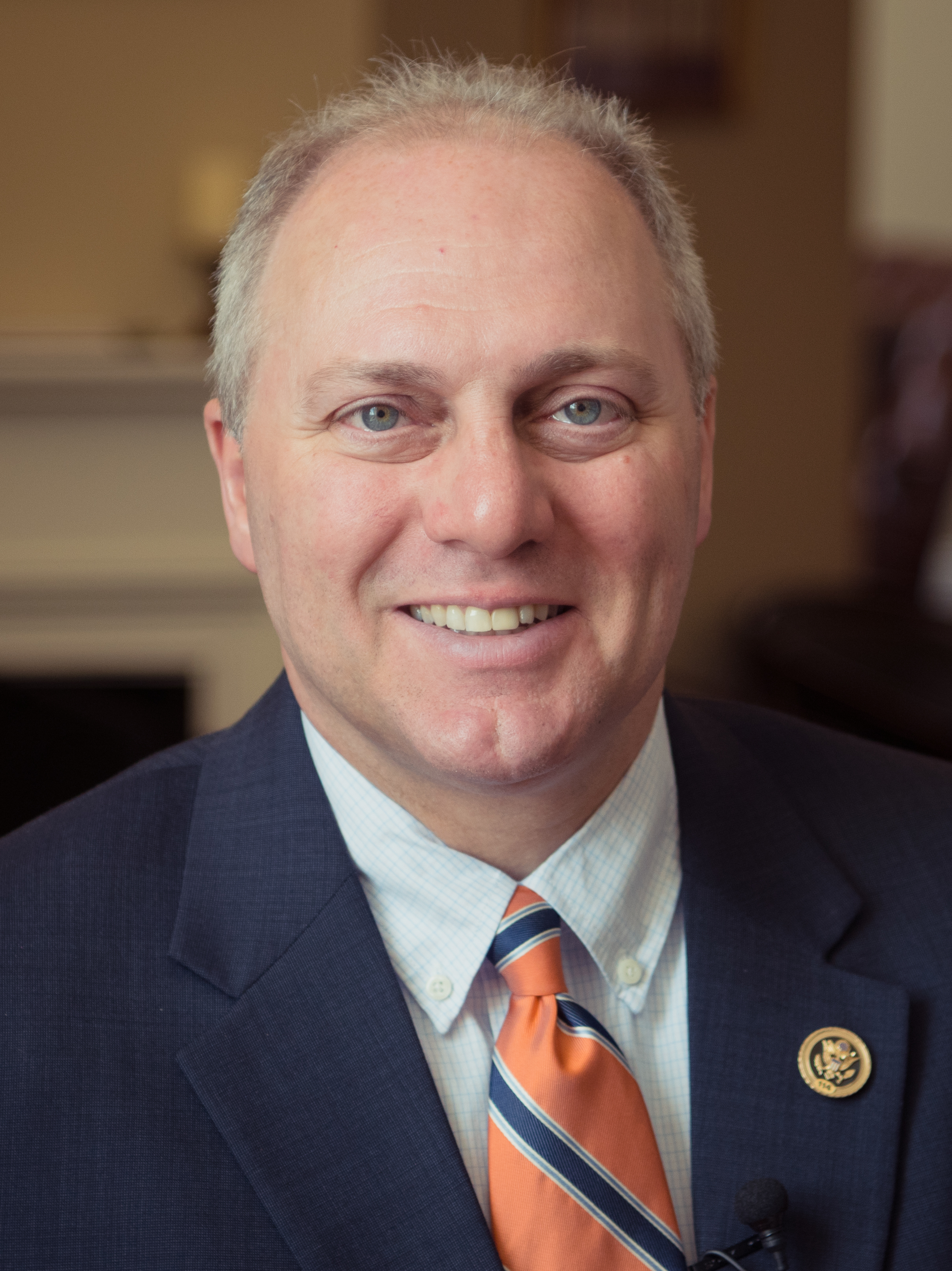
From left to right:
- Senator John Thune of South Dakota, a Republican and current Senate majority leader
- Representative Steve Scalise of Louisiana, a Republican and current House majority leader

In the federal Congress of the United States, the roles of the House majority leader and the Senate majority leader differ slightly. At the state level, the majority leader of a given state legislative chamber usually performs a role similar to that of their federal counterpart.

=== Senate ===
In the Senate, the vice president of the United States is officially the president of the Senate and the president pro tempore serves as the president of the Senate in the absence of the vice president. However, in reality, the vice president seldom enters the Senate, let alone directly presides over the chamber, unless a tied vote is expected, and the president pro tempore has become a ceremonial role deprived of any leadership ability.

Thus, the majority leader is seen as the de facto leader of the Senate, especially in modern times, and thus, in accordance with Senate rules, the presiding officer of the day gives the majority leader priority in obtaining recognition to speak on the floor of the Senate and they determine which bills get voted on. The majority leader is seen as the chief spokesperson for their party in the Senate.

In the United States Senate, the current majority leader is John Thune (R-SD), who was sworn in on January 3rd, 2025.

=== House of Representatives ===
In the House of Representatives the majority leader's presence and power often depends on the session. In some sessions, the majority leader takes precedence over the speaker as House leader and legislative party leader either by force (which usually occurs when the speaker of the House is unpopular) or because the speaker of the House voluntarily surrenders power to the majority leader. In most sessions, the speaker of the House takes precedence as house leader and party leader, with the majority leader being irrelevant and largely powerless outside the fact that they might be speaker of the House one day. The majority leader (as well as the speaker and the minority leader) are the only members of the House who can speak on the floor for an unlimited amount of time and cannot be interrupted by the chair.

In the United States House of Representatives, the current majority leader is Steve Scalise from Louisiana's 1st District.

== See also ==
- Floor leader
- Minority leader
