= Roger Leland Wollman =

American judge (born 1934)

Roger Wollman
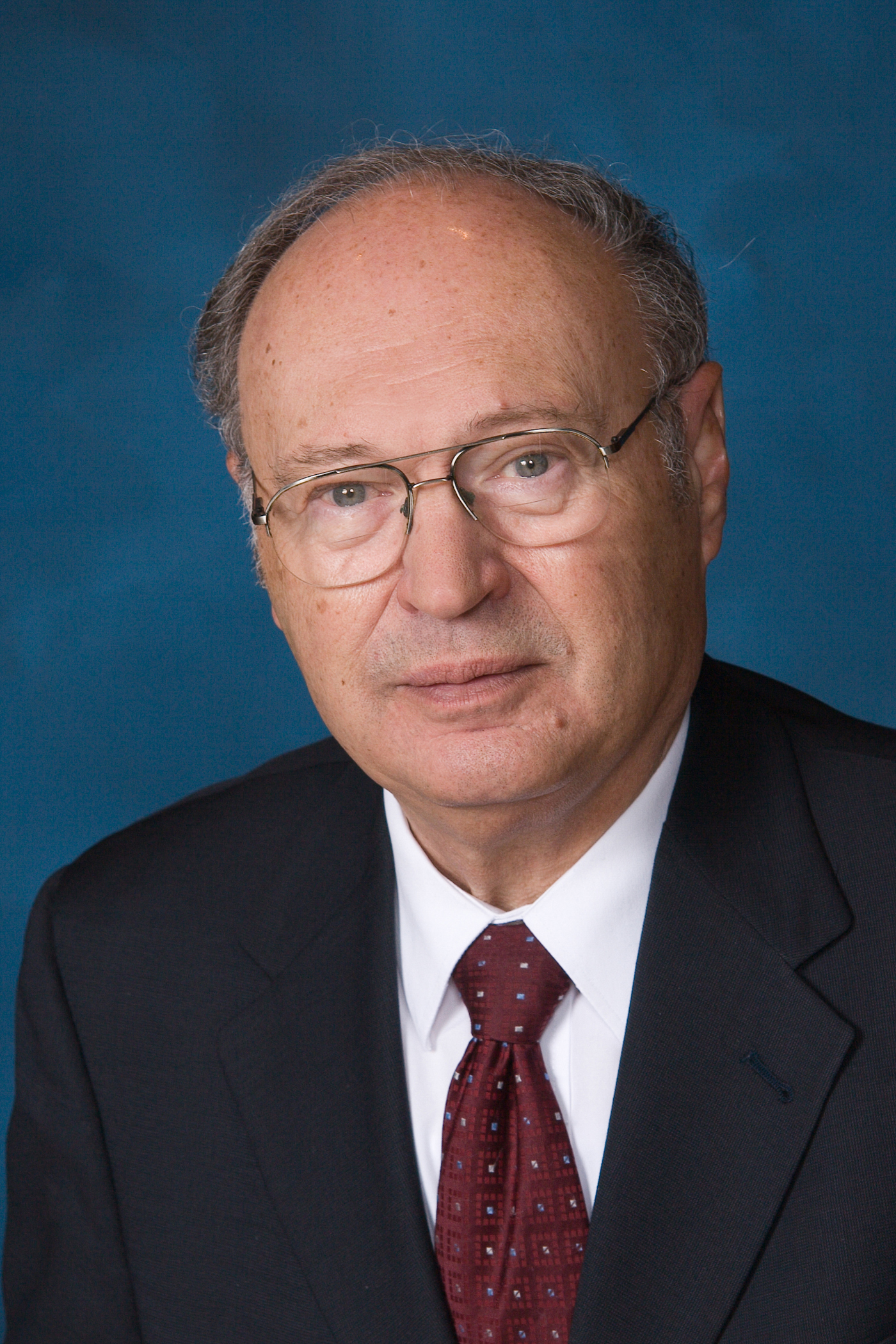

Senior Judge of the United States Court of Appeals for the Eighth Circuit
- Incumbent
- Assumed office December 14, 2018

Chief Judge of the United States Court of Appeals for the Eighth Circuit
- In office April 24, 1999 – February 1, 2002
- Preceded by: Pasco Bowman II
- Succeeded by: David R. Hansen

Judge of the United States Court of Appeals for the Eighth Circuit
- In office July 22, 1985 – December 14, 2018
- Appointed by: Ronald Reagan
- Preceded by: Seat established
- Succeeded by: Jonathan A. Kobes

Personal details
- Born: Roger Leland Wollman; May 29, 1934 (age 92) Frankfort, South Dakota, U.S.
- Relations: Harvey Wollman (brother)
- Education: Tabor College (BA); University of South Dakota (JD); Harvard University (LLM)

Roger Leland Wollman (born May 29, 1934) is a senior United States Circuit Judge and former Chief Judge of the United States Court of Appeals for the Eighth Circuit. He is the older brother of Harvey Wollman, former Governor of South Dakota.

== Early life and education ==
Born in Frankfort, South Dakota, Roger's parents were Edwin J. Wollman (1907–1981) and Katherine (Kleinsasser) Wollman (1905–2002). His ancestors were ethnic Germans living in Russia and Wollman grew up Mennonite. He attended Doland High School. Wollman received a Bachelor of Arts degree from Tabor College in 1957. He was in the United States Army from 1957 to 1959. He then attended the University of South Dakota School of Law, graduating magna cum laude in 1962 with a Juris Doctor. In 1964, he received a Master of Laws from Harvard Law School.

== Early career ==
Wollman began his career as a judicial law clerk to Judge George T. Mickelson of the United States District Court for the District of South Dakota from 1962 to 1963. He was in private practice of law in Aberdeen, South Dakota, from 1964 to 1971, and served as a State's attorney of Brown County, South Dakota, (in Aberdeen) from 1967 to 1971. Wollman served for fifteen years on the Supreme Court of South Dakota, including as chief justice from 1978 to 1982.

== Federal judicial service ==
Wollman was nominated by President Ronald Reagan on June 25, 1985, to the United States Court of Appeals for the Eighth Circuit, to a new seat created by 98 Stat. 333. South Dakota senior senator Larry Pressler worked with the White House to secure this nomination, and recommended Wollman as a conservative judge. He was the first South Dakotan on that court in 25 years. Wollman was confirmed by the United States Senate on July 19, 1985, and he received his commission on July 22, 1985. From 1999 to 2002, Wollman served as Chief Judge. Wollman maintains his chambers in Sioux Falls, South Dakota.

Among his judicial law clerks that worked under him include Ron A. Parsons Jr. and his successor Jonathan A. Kobes.

On February 9, 2018, Wollman notified President Donald Trump that he intended to step down as an active judge no later than the end of 2018. He assumed senior status on December 14, 2018, upon the confirmation of his successor and former clerk, Jonathan A. Kobes. Wollman assumed inactive senior status in September 2024.

== Cases ==
- United States v. Neil Scott Kramer

== See also ==
- List of United States federal judges by longevity of service

== Sources ==
Legal offices
New seat	Judge of the United States Court of Appeals for the Eighth Circuit; 1985–2018	Succeeded by Jonathan A. Kobes
Preceded by Pasco Bowman II	Chief Judge of the United States Court of Appeals for the Eighth Circuit; 1999–2002	Succeeded by David R. Hansen
