= United States v. Kramer =

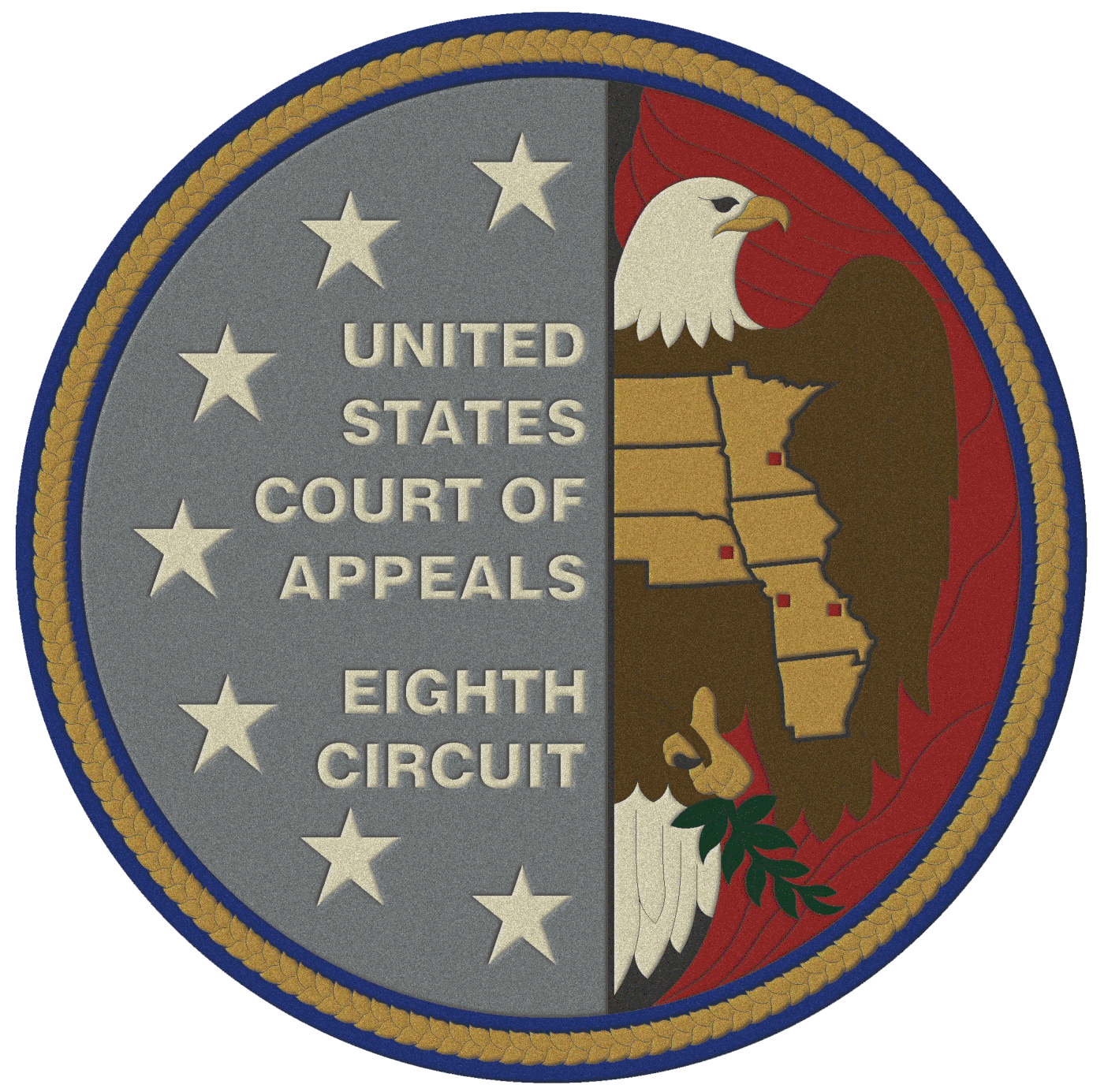
- Court: United States Court of Appeals for the Eighth Circuit
- Full case name: United States v. Neil Scott Kramer
- Decided: February 8, 2011
- Citation: 631 F.3d 900

Case history
- Prior history: United States District Court for the Western District of Missouri, Southern Division

Court membership
- Judges sitting: Roger Leland Wollman, Kermit Edward Bye, Bobby Shepherd

Case opinions
- Majority: Wollman, joined by a unanimous court

United States v. Neil Scott Kramer, 631 F.3d 900 (8th Cir. 2011), is a court case where a Motorola RAZR cellphone was used to coerce a minor into engaging in sex with an adult. Central to the case was whether a cellphone constituted a computer device. Under United States law, specifically U.S.S.G.§ 2G1.3(b)(3), the use of computers to persuade minors for illicit ends carriers extra legal ramifications. The opinion written by the United States Court of Appeals for the Eighth Circuit begins by citing Apple co-founder Steve Wozniak's musing that "Everything has a computer in it nowadays." Ultimately, the court found that a cell phone can be considered a computer if "the phone perform[s] arithmetic, logical, and storage functions," paving the way for harsher consequences for criminals engaging with minors over cellphones.

== Background ==
In April, 2008, a 15-year-old female Missouri resident inadvertently sent a text message to Kramer, an adult in Louisiana. Kramer replied to the message, which began a seven-month period in which he and the female victim regularly corresponded with one another through text messaging. During their communications, the victim revealed to Kramer that she was 15 years of age.

On November 10, 2008, the victim contacted Kramer and the two arranged to meet. The pair drove to the Comfort Inn in Willow Springs, Missouri, where Kramer "plied the victim with illegal narcotics and then engaged in sexual intercourse with her." The following morning, Kramer and the victim drove to Kramer's trailer in Violet, Louisiana. Upon their arrival, Kramer gave the victim more narcotics and again had sexual intercourse with her. On Friday November 14, Kramer took the victim to a bar in Poydras, Louisiana. After several alcoholic drinks, the victim went to the restroom where she was able to text the police. Kramer was arrested in the bar's parking lot, while the victim was eventually reunited with her family.

In court, Kramer was charged with transporting a minor across state lines in order to engage in illegal sexual activity, a violation of 18 U.S.C. § 2423(a). The state also sought a harsher sentencing for Kramer for using his cellphone to make voice calls and send text messages to the victim. In particular, the state argued that a cellphone falls under the definition of a computer under U.S.S.G.§ 2G1.3(b)(3), which states that "the use of a computer or an interactive computer service to ... persuade, induce, entice, coerce, or facilitate the travel of, the minor to engage in prohibited sexual conduct" will result in longer prison sentences.

== Court findings ==
The district court concluded that Kramer's phone did constitute a "computer", and applied a two-level enhancement, see U.S. Sentencing Guidelines Manual § 2G1.3(b)(3) (2009), for its use to facilitate the offense, and sentenced Kramer to 168 months' imprisonment. Without the enhancement, the district court would have sentenced Kramer to 140 months' imprisonment. The case was appealed, where the United States Court of Appeals for the Eighth Circuit upheld the lower court's ruling.

At the heart of the case was whether a cellphone constituted a computer. The Court of Appeals defined a computer to have the meaning given by 18 U.S.C. § 1030(e)(1) (the Computer Fraud and Abuse Act), which states a computer is an:

electronic, magnetic, optical, electrochemical, or other high speed data processing device performing logical, arithmetic, or storage functions, and includes any data storage facility or communications facility directly related to or operating in conjunction with such device

The Court of Appeals acknowledged that the language of 18 U.S.C. § 1030(e)(1) is "exceedingly broad", and that a "basic cellular phone might not easily fit within the colloquial definition of computer." However, the court stated that it was bound "not by the common understanding of that word, but by the specific--if broad--definition set forth in § 1030(e)(1)." The court left the potential for correcting the statute as a matter for the United States Sentencing Commission or for Congress to address.

Kramer's first contention was that the district court erred in applying the enhancement "because a cellular telephone, when used only to make voice calls and send text messages, cannot be a computer as defined in 18 U.S.C. § 1030(e)(1)." In effect, Kramer argued that United States v. Lay "implicitly distinguished [the] use of a cellular telephone from use of a traditional computer" thus, the enhancement should apply only when a device is used to access the Internet. The Court of Appeals disagreed; however, concluding that Kramer's reliance on United States v. Lay was misplaced for "there is nothing in the statutory definition that purports to exclude devices because they lack a connection to the Internet."

Kramer's second contention was "that the government's evidence was insufficient to demonstrate that his cellular phone was a computer." The government referenced the phone's user's manual and documentation from Motorola's website describing the phone's features.

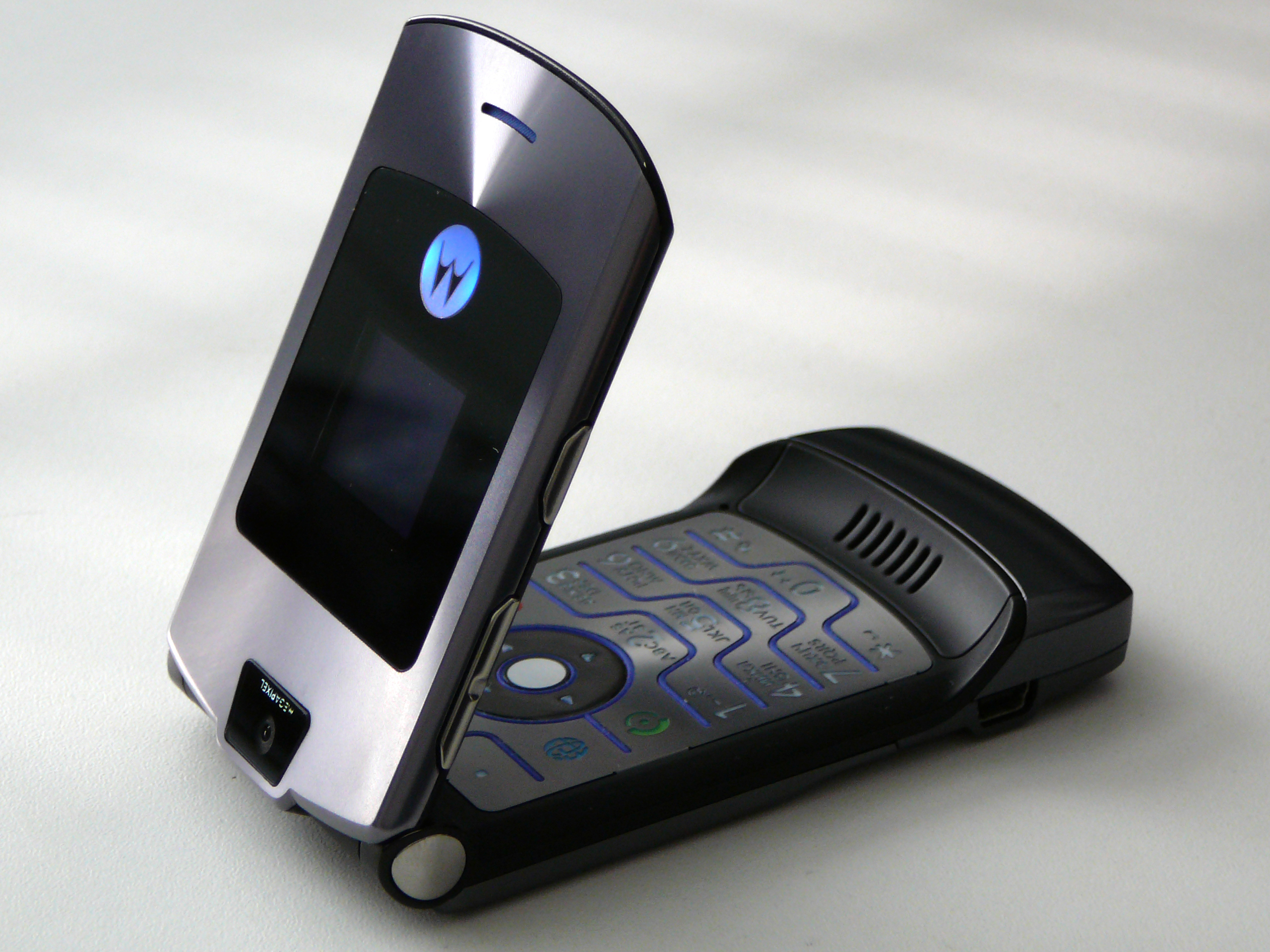
A Motorola RAZR V3 similar to the one used by Kramer.

The court used the following facts contained in these materials to demonstrate that Kramer's cellular phone was a computer:.

1. "The phone may include copyrighted Motorola and third-party software stored in semiconductor memories or other media." The court used this as evidence that the phone makes use of an electronic data processor
2. "The phone keeps track of the 'Network connection time,' which is 'the elapsed time from the moment [the user] connect[s] to [the] service provider's network to the moment [the user] end[s] the call by pressing [the end key].'" The court used this as evidence that the phone performs logical and arithmetic operations when placing calls.
3. "The phone stores sets of characters that are available to a user when typing a message." The court used this as evidence that the phone performs storage functions.

These materials "were sufficient to show by a preponderance of the evidence that Kramer's phone was an 'electronic ... or other high speed data processing device' that 'perform[ed] logical, arithmetic, or storage functions' when Kramer used it to call and text message the victim."

For the reasons enumerated above, The Court of Appeals affirmed Kramer's sentence.

== See also ==
- Computer Fraud and Abuse Act
