= Jonathan A. Kobes =

American judge (born 1974)

Jonathan Kobes
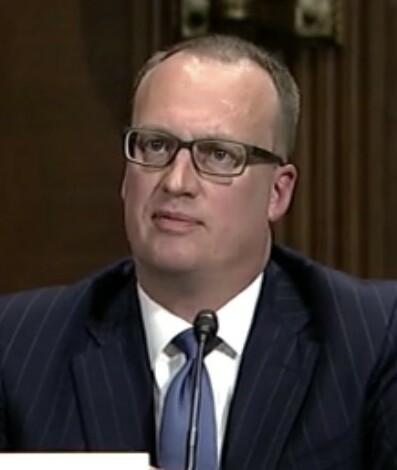

Judge of the United States Court of Appeals for the Eighth Circuit
- Incumbent
- Assumed office December 12, 2018
- Appointed by: Donald Trump
- Preceded by: Roger Leland Wollman

Personal details
- Born: Jonathan Allen Kobes; August 25, 1974 (age 51) Sioux City, Iowa, U.S.
- Party: Republican
- Education: Dordt University (BA); Harvard University (JD)

Jonathan Allen Kobes (born August 25, 1974) is a United States circuit judge of the United States Court of Appeals for the Eighth Circuit.

== Education ==
Kobes received his Bachelor of Arts from Dordt University and his Juris Doctor from Harvard Law School, where he was an editor and the business manager of the Harvard Journal of Law and Public Policy. During law school, Kobes worked at the Massachusetts Attorney General's Office, the United States Senate Committee on the Judiciary, the United States Attorney's Office for the Northern District of Iowa, and the Chicago office of McDermott Will & Emery.

== Legal career ==
After graduating from law school, Kobes served as a law clerk to Judge Roger Leland Wollman of the United States Court of Appeals for the Eighth Circuit. He then worked from 2002 to 2003 as litigation attorney at the Central Intelligence Agency and from 2003 to 2005 as Assistant United States Attorney for the District of South Dakota. Kobes was an associate at the Sioux Falls, South Dakota, office of Murphy, Goldammer & Prendergast from 2005 to 2008. Kobes was then senior counsel to POET in Sioux Falls, senior regulatory counsel to DuPont Pioneer in Johnston, Iowa, and Director of Corporate Compliance at Raven Industries.

From 2014 to 2018, Kobes worked as General Counsel to U.S. Senator Mike Rounds. He was also a member of the Central Committee of the Lincoln County Republican Party.

== Federal judicial service ==
On June 7, 2018, President Donald Trump announced his intent to nominate Kobes to serve as a United States Circuit Judge of the United States Court of Appeals for the Eighth Circuit. On June 11, 2018, his nomination was sent to the Senate. Trump nominated Kobes to the seat being vacated by Judge Roger Leland Wollman, who previously announced his intention to assume senior status upon confirmation of a successor. On August 22, 2018, a hearing on his nomination was held before the Senate Judiciary Committee. On September 14, 2018, the American Bar Association's Standing Committee on the Federal Judiciary rated Kobes "Not Qualified." The ABA's report said that Kobes was "a very accomplished, competent, and capable person, but his career path has not resulted in sufficient evidence of a developed ability to do the written work of a United States circuit court judge." The ABA report questioned Kobes' understanding of "complex legal analysis" and "knowledge of the law". At the time of his nomination, Kobes had tried six cases during his legal career, cases that the ABA considered straightforward and not "legally complex".

On October 11, 2018, Kobes' nomination was reported out of the Senate Judiciary Committee by a 11–10 vote. On November 29, 2018, the United States Senate invoked cloture on Kobes' nomination by a 50–49 vote, with Vice President Mike Pence breaking the tie. On December 11, 2018, he was confirmed by a 51–50 vote, with Pence casting his vote in the affirmative. He was the first federal judicial nominee ever confirmed by a tie-breaking vote. Kobes received his judicial commission on December 12, 2018.

== Notable cases ==
In December 2021, Kobes upheld the 20-year prison sentence of a doctor at the United States Department of Veterans Affairs who misdiagnosed a patient, resulting in the patient's death.

== Memberships ==
Kobes was a member of the Federalist Society from 1999 to 2004.

== See also ==
- Donald Trump judicial appointment controversies

Legal offices
Preceded by Roger Leland Wollman	Judge of the United States Court of Appeals for the Eighth Circuit; 2018–present	Incumbent
