= United States v. Lay =

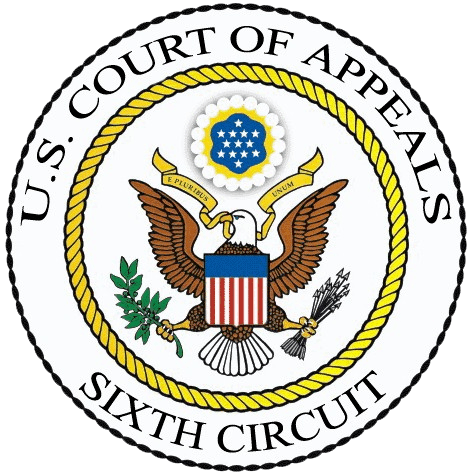
- Court: United States Court of Appeals, Sixth Circuit.
- Full case name: United States v. Dennis LAY
- Argued: January 16, 2009
- Decided: October 13, 2009

Holding
- Affirmed Lay's sentence.

Court membership
- Judges sitting: Merritt, Rogers, and White

In United States v. Lay, 583 F.3d 436 (6th Cir. 2009), the Sixth Circuit Court of Appeals evaluated the addition of two Sentencing Guideline enhancements to Lay's sentencing in the lower district Court. These enhancements regarded the influencing of a minor to engage in prohibited sexual conduct and the use of a computer to persuade, induce, entice, coerce, or facilitate the travel of a minor to engage in prohibited sexual conduct. Following Lay's appeal, the Court of Appeals upheld the addition of these enhancements, affirming the lower district Court’s sentencing.

This case is noteworthy because its mixed opinion, regarding the applicability of the two-point enhancement under U.S.S.G. § 2G1.3(b)(3)(A), paved the way for future cases to argue that the lack of Internet connectivity is sufficient in dismissing similar computer related enhancements.

== Background ==
In June 2006, 53-year-old Dennis Lay made the online acquaintance of a 15-year-old minor (M.V.). Subsequently, for a period of approximately two months, Lay remained in close contact with M.V. exchanging messages online.

In July 2006, Lay began communicating via telephone, making several calls to M.V.’s house. After numerous occasions where M.V.’s mother answered when Lay called, Lay sent M.V. a package containing "a mobile phone, clothing, and over $200".

In the later part of July, M.V.'s mother learned that M.V. claimed to be in love with Lay and wanted to travel to California to live with him. M.V’s mother then alerted Ohio police who discovered the mobile phone Lay had sent. An officer, using this phone, called Lay. Lay claimed to not know M.V.’s age and hung up when asked further questions. Despite having been informed of M.V.’s age, Lay continued communicating with M.V.; however, all of these subsequent communications were done over the phone or through writing, not an online medium.

In November 2006, Lay mailed a package to one of M.V.’s friends with instructions to deliver it to M.V. "Inside the package was two letters, four pictures, a plastic ring sizer, a music CD, a half-dollar coin, and $200." These letters detailed plans for meeting up at a hotel and instructed M.V. to avoid telling anyone of this plan. In the following days, Lay continued to have numerous sexually explicit conversations with M.V. over the phone, and further discussed how he planned to trick M.V.’s mother into allowing M.V. to leave for the weekend. However, unbeknownst to Lay, M.V.'s mother had discovered Lay's letters and had subsequently allowed police to record these phone calls.

On December 29th, 2006 Lay flew from California to meet M.V. Upon landing at Hopkins Airport, Lay was subsequently arrested by FBI agents waiting for him in the baggage claim area.

== Court findings ==
In January 2007, a federal grand jury indicted Lay with a single count of knowingly traveling in interstate commerce for the purpose of engaging in illicit sexual conduct, in violation of 18 U.S.C. § 2423(b).

Lay pled guilty to this charge in March 2007; however, following a sentence hearing in July 2007, the district Court recommended the addition of three Sentencing Guideline enhancements namely: "U.S.S.G. § 2G1.3(b)(2)(B) for unduly influencing a minor to engage in prohibited sexual conduct, U.S.S.G. § 2G1.3(b)(3)(B) for use of a computer to entice a person to engage in prohibited sexual conduct with a minor, and U.S.S.G. § 3B1.4 for using a minor in the commission of the crime."

Lay contested these enhancements, testifying before the Court. Having heard Lay’s testimony, the Court ruled to dismiss the enhancement under U.S.S.G. § 3B1.4 but upheld the enhancements under U.S.S.G. § 2G1.3(b)(2)(B) and U.S.S.G. § 2G1.3(b)(3)(B); sentencing Lay to "imprisonment for 84 months, followed by 20 years of supervised release."

Lay appealed his sentence, arguing that it was both "procedurally and substantively unreasonable". The Court of Appeals later affirmed the district Court’s decision and Lay's sentencing.

=== Undue influence ===
Refuting the enhancement for unduly influencing a minor, Lay argued that it was M.V.’s idea for Lay to meet and, consequently, M.V. lied to and manipulated him. Therefore, he proposed, M.V. influenced him to the same degree that he might have influenced M.V., thus making such an enhancement inapplicable.

Addressing this, the district Court recounted Lay’s testimony, wherein he described M.V. as troubled, vulnerable, and having experienced family problems, and the unidirectional material relationship he shared with M.V. Because of this and Lay’s testimony, which “[served] as nothing more than an attempt to divert [blame]”, the district Court concluded that Lay was the sole manipulator. Thus, the district Court rejected his argument.

The Court of Appeals upheld this ruling, noting how Lay “had not made a factual showing sufficient to overcome the applicable rebuttable presumption that the age difference between Lay and M.V. indicated undue influence.” Continuing, the Court of Appeals expanded upon the district Courts ruling by highlighting how the facts of the case were “consistent with a manipulative adult building a relationship with a minor for the purpose of eventual sexual activity.”

=== Use of a computer to entice ===
Regarding the enhancement for using a computer to entice a minor, Lay argued that such an enhancement was inappropriate because none of the communication about sexual conduct had occurred via a computer.

Addressing this, the district Court argued that because “[Lay] met the victim in this case through the use of a computer” with the goal, as shown through the facts of this case, to engage in prohibited sexual conduct with a minor. Therefore, the court concluded, the advisory guideline of using “a computer or interactive computer service to entice, encourage, offer, to engage” in such activities is sufficient. Subsequently, the district Court rejected Lays argument for, while “perhaps a matter for further review”, the “mere use of a computer to contact, communicate with, and entice a fifteen-year-old to begin a relationship was sufficient for the enhancement to apply”.

However, this generalized application of “mere use” was not unanimously supported by the Court of Appeals, as Justices argued over the stipulation of “involving a computer or interactive computer service [to entice].”

== Ruling ==
=== Majority opinion ===
The majority opinion upheld the district Court’s ruling, arguing that the Internet allowed sexual predators to “make explicit proposals of sexual activity or merely to strike up friendships with potential victims” far more readily and “more insidiously, than would be possible offline.” Then, addressing the dissenting, the majority argued how the restricting of the enhancement to only apply to sexual predators that develop relationships with minor victims, “so long as the ultimate consummation is first proposed through online communication, would not serve the purpose of this enhancement.”

=== Minority opinion ===
The minority opinion, whilst agreeing with the majority in regards to the potential impact of the Internet, rejected the idea that such an enhancement could be applied so universally. Rather they argued, because both the district Court and majority concede that there was “no evidence that Lay ever discussed sexual activities over the computer with the victim”, the enhancements requirement for a computer thereby invalidates any further inquiries.

== Impact ==
The courts emphasis on the importance and relevance of Internet connectivity in this case paved the way for subsequent cases, like that of United States v. Kramer 631 F.3d 900 (8th Cir. 2011), to question the applicability of similar enhancements when the behavior occurs entirely offline.

== See also ==
United States v. Kramer
