= List of tie-breaking votes cast by the vice president of the United States =

Under Article I, Section 3, Clause 4 of the Constitution of the United States, the vice president of the United States is the ex officio president of the Senate but may only cast a vote in the Senate to break a tie. As of January 14, 2026, vice presidents have cast a total of 309 tie-breaking votes in the Senate. There are also two tie-breaking votes cast by Chief Justice Salmon P. Chase during the 1868 impeachment trial of President Andrew Johnson, although it is still debated whether he had the authority to do so.

== Constitutional basis ==
Article I, Section 3, Clause 4 of the Constitution of the United States states:

The Vice President of the United States shall be President of the Senate, but shall have no Vote, unless they be equally divided.

When there is a tie in the Senate, as seen here for the passage of the One Big Beautiful Bill Act as amended, the vice president (in this case, JD Vance) has to step in to break the tie, or the motion fails by default.

== History ==
John Adams, the first vice president of the United States, cast 29 tie-breaking votes during his tenure. His first vote was on July 18, 1789. He used his votes to preserve the president's sole authority over the removal of appointees, influence the location of the national capital, and prevent war with Great Britain. At times, he even convinced senators to vote against legislation that he opposed and often provided guidance on procedural and policy matters. Adams' political views and active role in the Senate made him a target for critics of the Washington administration. Toward the end of his first term, threatened by a resolution that would have silenced him on all but procedural and policy matters, he exercised more restraint, hoping to be elected president of the United States in his own right.

John C. Calhoun was the only vice president to cast tie-breaking votes against his own president. In 1832, Calhoun cast a tie-breaking vote to delay and later defeat President Andrew Jackson’s nomination of Martin Van Buren as United States Minister to the United Kingdom. Calhoun's supporters in the Senate allowed him to defy Jackson, where just enough of Calhoun's faction abstained to create a tie that he then broke.

In the early 21st century, the threat of a filibuster increased the use of cloture to end debate in the Senate, especially on highly divisive issues, making it rare for the vice president to have the opportunity to cast a decisive vote, as cloture requires a three-fifths majority. However, rules changes in 2013 and 2017 reduced the requirement for cloture on nominations to a simple majority, which led to the first use of a tie-breaking vote to confirm a Cabinet member when Vice President Mike Pence confirmed Betsy DeVos as secretary of education in 2017. In 2018, Pence cast a tie-breaking vote to confirm Jonathan A. Kobes to the Court of Appeals for the Eighth Circuit, the first such vote to confirm a judicial nominee in U.S. history.

Following the 2020 Senate elections, the Senate was divided 50-50 between Republicans and Democrats in the 117th Congress. Votes by Vice President Kamala Harris played a critical role in passing Democratic legislation, including the American Rescue Plan and the Inflation Reduction Act. In addition, Harris gave the Democratic Party majority-control of the Senate. On July 20, 2021, Harris broke Pence's record for the most tie-breaking votes in the first year of a vice presidency, casting seven tie-breaking votes in her first six months. She cast a total of 15 tie-breaking votes in her first year, setting a new record for the most tie-breaking votes in a single year, surpassing the 12 votes cast by John Adams in 1790. On May 11, 2022, Harris set a new record for tie-breaking votes in a single day, casting four votes. On July 13, 2023, Harris matched Calhoun's record for the most tie-breaking votes cast by a vice president at 31 votes. On December 5, 2023, Harris broke Calhoun's record. In response, she received a "golden gavel" from Majority Leader Chuck Schumer to recognize her record. On January 24, 2025, JD Vance cast his first tie breaking vote, the earliest that a vice president has cast such a vote, to confirm Pete Hegseth as Secretary of Defense.

The recent rise in the frequency of vice presidential votes is due in part to the Senate being equally divided on procedural votes, such as on invoking cloture, in addition to final votes on divisive issues, resulting in the vice president needing to vote multiple times on the same nominee or resolution. Since legislation or nominations will fail to be passed or confirmed in the event of a tie, there is no reason for a "Nay" tie-breaking vote, even though it has happened; the last tie-breaking "Nay" vote was cast by George H. W. Bush in 1986.

== List of vice presidents by number of tie-breaking votes ==
As of July 15, 2025, there have been 309 tie-breaking votes cast by 38 vice presidents. Kamala Harris cast the most tie-breaking votes (33) of any vice president.

Rank	Number cast	Name	Party	Order in office	Term of office	President(s)
1	33	Kamala Harris	Democratic	49	January 20, 2021 – January 20, 2025	Joe Biden
2	31	John C. Calhoun	Democratic-Republican	7	March 4, 1825 – December 28, 1832	John Quincy Adams / Andrew Jackson
3	29	John Adams	Federalist	1	April 21, 1789 – March 4, 1797	George Washington
4	19	George M. Dallas	Democratic	11	March 4, 1845 – March 4, 1849	James K. Polk
5	18	Schuyler Colfax	Republican	17	March 4, 1869 – March 4, 1873	Ulysses S. Grant
6 (tie)	14	George Clinton	Democratic-Republican	4	March 4, 1805 – April 20, 1812	Thomas Jefferson / James Madison
6 (tie)	14	Richard Mentor Johnson	Democratic	9	March 4, 1837 – March 4, 1841	Martin Van Buren
8	13	Mike Pence	Republican	48	January 20, 2017 – January 20, 2021	Donald Trump
9	10	John C. Breckinridge	Democratic	14	March 4, 1857 – March 4, 1861	James Buchanan
10 (tie)	9	Elbridge Gerry	Democratic-Republican	5	March 4, 1813 – November 23, 1814	James Madison
10 (tie)	9	Thomas R. Marshall	Democratic	28	March 4, 1913 – March 4, 1921	Woodrow Wilson
12 (tie)	8	Alben W. Barkley	Democratic	35	January 20, 1949 – January 20, 1953	Harry S. Truman
12 (tie)	8	Richard Nixon	Republican	36	January 20, 1953 – January 20, 1961	Dwight D. Eisenhower
12 (tie)	8	Dick Cheney	Republican	46	January 20, 2001 – January 20, 2009	George W. Bush
12 (tie)	8	JD Vance	Republican	50	January 20, 2025 – Incumbent	Donald Trump
16 (tie)	7	Hannibal Hamlin	Republican	15	March 4, 1861 – March 4, 1865	Abraham Lincoln
16 (tie)	7	George H. W. Bush	Republican	43	January 20, 1981 – January 20, 1989	Ronald Reagan
18 (tie)	6	Daniel D. Tompkins	Democratic-Republican	6	March 4, 1817 – March 4, 1825	James Monroe
18 (tie)	6	William A. Wheeler	Republican	19	March 4, 1877 – March 4, 1881	Rutherford B. Hayes
20 (tie)	4	Martin Van Buren	Democratic	8	March 4, 1833 – March 4, 1837	Andrew Jackson
20 (tie)	4	Levi P. Morton	Republican	22	March 4, 1889 – March 4, 1893	Benjamin Harrison
20 (tie)	4	James S. Sherman	Republican	27	March 4, 1909 – October 30, 1912	William Howard Taft
20 (tie)	4	Henry A. Wallace	Democratic	33	January 20, 1941 – January 20, 1945	Franklin D. Roosevelt
20 (tie)	4	Hubert Humphrey	Democratic	38	January 20, 1965 – January 20, 1969	Lyndon B. Johnson
20 (tie)	4	Al Gore	Democratic	45	January 20, 1993 – January 20, 2001	Bill Clinton
26 (tie)	3	Thomas Jefferson	Democratic-Republican	2	March 4, 1797 – March 4, 1801	John Adams
26 (tie)	3	Aaron Burr	Democratic-Republican	3	March 4, 1801 – March 4, 1805	Thomas Jefferson
26 (tie)	3	Millard Fillmore	Whig	12	March 4, 1849 – July 9, 1850	Zachary Taylor
26 (tie)	3	Chester A. Arthur	Republican	20	March 4, 1881 – September 19, 1881	James A. Garfield
26 (tie)	3	Charles Curtis	Republican	31	March 4, 1929 – March 4, 1933	Herbert Hoover
26 (tie)	3	John Nance Garner	Democratic	32	March 4, 1933 – January 20, 1941	Franklin D. Roosevelt
32 (tie)	2	Adlai Stevenson I	Democratic	23	March 4, 1893 – March 4, 1897	Grover Cleveland
32 (tie)	2	Charles G. Dawes	Republican	30	March 4, 1925 – March 4, 1929	Calvin Coolidge
32 (tie)	2	Spiro Agnew	Republican	39	January 20, 1969 – October 10, 1973	Richard Nixon
35 (tie)	1	Henry Wilson	Republican	18	March 4, 1873 – November 22, 1875	Ulysses S. Grant
35 (tie)	1	Garret Hobart	Republican	24	March 4, 1897 – November 21, 1899	William McKinley
35 (tie)	1	Harry S. Truman	Democratic	34	January 20, 1945 – April 12, 1945	Franklin D. Roosevelt
35 (tie)	1	Walter Mondale	Democratic	42	January 20, 1977 – January 20, 1981	Jimmy Carter
39 (tie)	0	John Tyler	Whig	10	March 4, 1841 – April 4, 1841	William Henry Harrison
39 (tie)	0	William R. King	Democratic	13	March 4, 1853 – April 18, 1853	Franklin Pierce
39 (tie)	0	Andrew Johnson	National Union	16	March 4, 1865 – April 15, 1865	Abraham Lincoln
39 (tie)	0	Thomas A. Hendricks	Democratic	21	March 4, 1885 – November 25, 1885	Grover Cleveland
39 (tie)	0	Theodore Roosevelt	Republican	25	March 4, 1901 – September 14, 1901	William McKinley
39 (tie)	0	Charles W. Fairbanks	Republican	26	March 4, 1905 – March 4, 1909	Theodore Roosevelt
39 (tie)	0	Calvin Coolidge	Republican	29	March 4, 1921 – August 2, 1923	Warren G. Harding
39 (tie)	0	Lyndon B. Johnson	Democratic	37	January 20, 1961 – November 22, 1963	John F. Kennedy
39 (tie)	0	Gerald Ford	Republican	40	December 6, 1973 – August 9, 1974	Richard Nixon
39 (tie)	0	Nelson Rockefeller	Republican	41	December 19, 1974 – January 20, 1977	Gerald Ford
39 (tie)	0	Dan Quayle	Republican	44	January 20, 1989 – January 20, 1993	George H. W. Bush
39 (tie)	0	Joe Biden	Democratic	47	January 20, 2009 – January 20, 2017	Barack Obama

== List of tie-breaking votes ==
Senate President	Date	Action	Vote	Ultimate result
John Adams	July 18, 1789	To strike out of the bill("An act for establishing an Executive Department, to be denominated the Department of Foreign Affairs.") these words: page 3d, line 15th, 'by the President of the United States'.	Nay: 9–10	Motion defeated.
John Adams	August 25, 1789	To recede from disagreement to a House amendment to the bill (1 STAT 65, APP. 9–2-1789), to establish a treasury dept.; said amendment provides that in the absence of a Secretary of the Treasury, the assistant shall have charge of the office.	Yea: 11-10	Motion agreed to.
John Adams	September 21, 1789	To amend the act (1 STAT 101, APP. 3–1-90), to allow compensation to the judges of the Supreme Court and other courts, and to the attorney general; to increase the salary of the Chief Justice from $3500 to $4000.	Yea: 10-9	Amendment passed.
John Adams	September 24, 1789	To Amend H.R. 25, to insert, as possible sites, certain counties in the state of Pennsylvania, including Germantown and Philadelphia	Yea: 10-9	Amendment passed.
John Adams	May 26, 1790	To decide if the sum of two thousand dollars will remain in the act (6 STAT 2, APP. 6–4-90), to adjust the claim of Baron De Steuben.	Yea: 13-12	Motion passed.
John Adams	May 26, 1790	To amend the Steuben bill to eliminate the provision for a sum of seven thousand dollars, in addition to the money already received by him.	Nay: 12–13	Amendment failed.
John Adams	May 27, 1790	To amend the Steuben bill to change to the sum to be paid to Steuben from two thousand dollars to two thousand five hundred dollars.	Yea: 13-12	Amendment passed.
John Adams	June 8, 1790	To take the opinion of the Senate, whether it be expedient, at this time, to determine upon any place for the permanent seat of the Government of the United States.	Nay: 12-13	Motion defeated.
John Adams	June 29, 1790	"To amend the [previous] motion, as follows: And be it enacted, That Congress shall continue to hold their sessions in the city of New York until the first Monday in December, in the year one thousand seven hundred and ninety-four; and, from and after the said first Monday in December, one thousand seven hundred and ninety-four, Congress shall hold their sessions in the city of Philadelphia, and shall continue there to hold the same until the first Monday of December, one thousand and eight hundred."	Nay: 13-14	Motion defeated.
Richard Mentor Johnson	January 27, 1838	Motion to adjourn.	Nay: 21–22	Motion defeated.
Richard Mentor Johnson	February 21, 1838	Motion "to postpone the special order of the day for the purpose of considering the bill (S. 86) for the continuation of the Cumberland road in the States of Ohio, Indiana, and Illinois."	Nay: 21–22	Motion defeated.
Richard Mentor Johnson	December 19, 1838	Passage of S. 7 ("for the relief of William East").	Yea: 19-18	Bill passed.
Richard Mentor Johnson	February 4, 1839	Shall S. 231 ("for the relief of the legal representative of John J. Bulow, Jr. deceased") be "engrossed, and read a third time?"	Yea: 20-19	Bill engrossed and read a third time.
Richard Mentor Johnson	February 6, 1839	Shall S. 11 ("for the relief of John McCloud") be "engrossed, and read a third time?"	Yea: 19-18	Bill engrossed and read a third time.
Richard Mentor Johnson	February 20, 1839	Passage of S. 267 ("for the relief of Mira M. Alexander").	Yea: 20-19	Bill passed.
Richard Mentor Johnson	February 7, 1840	Motion to table a motion by William C. Preston ("calling on the Secretary of the Treasury for information in relation to the Cumberland road").	Nay: 20–21	Motion defeated.
Richard Mentor Johnson	February 7, 1840	Motion to indefinitely postpone further consideration of Senator Preston's motion.	Nay: 22–23	The motion to postpone failed. Preston's motion, with amendments, was rejected by a vote of 4–39.
Richard Mentor Johnson	March 25, 1840	Porter amendment to Henderson amendment to a resolution from the Committee on Indian Affairs regarding the Second Treaty of Buffalo Creek	Nay: 18–19	Amendment defeated.
Richard Mentor Johnson	March 25, 1840	Agreeing to the original Henderson amendment to the resolution.	Yea: 20-19	Amendment passed.
Richard Mentor Johnson	March 25, 1840	Agreeing to the resolution from the Committee on Indian Affairs, as amended.	Yea: 20-19	Resolution adopted.
Richard Mentor Johnson	May 7, 1840	Motion to adourn.	Nay: 12–13	Motion defeated.
Richard Mentor Johnson	June 5, 1840	Shall S. 112 ("for the relief of the legal representatives of Philip Barbour, deceased") be "engrossed, and read a third time?"	Yea: 21-20	Bill engrossed and read a third time.
Richard Mentor Johnson	January 20, 1841	Amendment to S. 28 ("to establish a permanent prospective pre-emption system in favor of settlers on the public lands who shall inhabit and cultivate the same, and raise a log-cabin thereon").	Nay: 24–25	Amendment defeated.
George M. Dallas	February 3, 1846	Motion to reconsider the vote on Evans amendment to S. 37 ("to pay the debt ascertained to be due to Texas when an independent state").	Yea: 23-22	Motion agreed to.
George M. Dallas	April 14, 1846	Motion to proceed to the consideration of the nomination of Gideon Welles to be chief of the Bureau of Provisions and Clothing of the Navy.	Yea: 21-20	Motion agreed to.
George M. Dallas	April 15, 1846	"Will the Senate advise and consent to the appointment of Gideon Welles?"	Yea: 25-24	Welles confirmed.
George M. Dallas	May 15, 1846	Motion to "to reconsider the vote disagreeing to the amendment of the House of Representatives to the bill (S. 29) to provide for raising a regiment of mounted riflemen."	Nay: 22–23	Motion failed.
George M. Dallas	July 23, 1846	On the question of concurring with a report from the Committee on Printing recommending against printing several memorials and proceedings.	Nay: 25–26	Report not concurred with. Said memorials and proceedings were ordered to be printed.
George M. Dallas	July 28, 1846	Motion to commit H.R. 384 ("reducing the duty on imports, and for other purposes") to a special committee.	Nay: 27–28	Motion failed.
George M. Dallas	July 28, 1846	Motion to engross an amendment to H.R. 384 and read the bill a third time.	Yea: 28-27	Motion succeeded.
George M. Dallas	December 23, 1846	Motion to amend a report from the Committee on Printing that recommended against printing "a memorial of the representatives of the Society of Friends of New England."	Nay: 21–22	Motion failed.
George M. Dallas	January 16, 1847	Motion to postpone further consideration on S. 99 ("to make grants of land to the non commissioned officers, musicians, and privates of the army serving in Mexico") for the purpose of proceeding to consider H.R. 576 ("to raise, for a limitied time an additional military force, and for other purposes").	Yea: 24-23	Motion agreed to.
George M. Dallas	January 19, 1847	Motion to amend an amendment from the Committee on Military Affairs to H.R. 576.	Nay: 26–27	Amendment defeated.
George M. Dallas	January 22, 1847	Motion to adjourn.	Nay: 22–23	Motion failed.
George M. Dallas	January 25, 1847	Motion to proceed to the consideration of H.R. 600 ("authorizing the issue of treasury notes, a loan, and for other purposes").	Yea: 25-24	Motion agreed to.
George M. Dallas	February 27, 1847	Amendment striking out a section of H.R. 635 (appropriations for the Post Office).	Nay: 19–20	Amendment defeated.
George M. Dallas	February 27, 1847	Amendment to H.R. 599 ("making appropriations for the civil and diplomatic expenses of government for the year ending the 30th day of June, 1848, and for other purposes").	Nay: 22–23	Amendment defeated.
George M. Dallas	December 29, 1847	Motion to proceed to consideration of S. 29 ("to raise, for a limited time, an additional military force").	Yea: 20-19	Motion agreed to.
George M. Dallas	March 8, 1848	Motion to adjourn.	Nay: 26–27	Motion failed.
George M. Dallas	June 20, 1848	Amendment to an amendment to H.R. 136 ("making appropriations for the current and contingent expenses of the Indian Department, and for fulfilling treaty stipulations with the various Indian tribes for the year ending June 30, 1849, and for other purposes").	Nay: 20–21	Amendment defeated.
George M. Dallas	June 22, 1848	Motion to table a resolution "respecting the appointment of a superintendent of the ante chamber of the Senate."	Nay: 19–20	Motion failed. Resolution referred to "the committee on the contingent expenses of the Senate."
George M. Dallas	February 8, 1849	"On the quesion, 'Shall the amendment be engrossed and the bill read a third time?'" The amendment had passed in an earlier vote, and the bill in question was H.R. 32 ("for the relief of David Myerlee").	Yea: 25-24	The amendment was engrossed, and the bill was read a third time and passed.
Millard Fillmore	January 7, 1850	Miller amendment to a resolution proposed by Senator Clemens "on to the appointment of civil or military governor of California, the organization of a State government under his instructions, and to a proposed convention in Mexico."	Yea: 30-29	Amendment passed.
Millard Fillmore	January 9, 1850	Election of a chaplain was tied between Rev. C. M. Butler and Rev. Henry Slicer. During this election, "the question arose as to the Vice-President's power to act in such a case...Senators of experience discussed the subject, but approved the action of Fillmore which had behind it the earlier precedent" of a similar tied chaplain election on Dec. 14, 1829.	Butler: 31, Slicer: 30	Butler elected.
Millard Fillmore	January 14, 1850	Dickinson amendment to S.R. 1 ("suspending, for a limited time, the limitation upon the expense of collecting the revenue from customs")	Yea: 28-27	Amendment passed.
William R. King	No votes			
John C. Breckinridge	March 15, 1858	Motion to adjourn.	Nay: 17–18	Motion defeated.
John C. Breckinridge	May 12, 1858	Motion to postpone consideration of S. 10 ("repealing all laws, or parts of laws, allowing bounties to vessels employed in the bank or other cod fisheries").	Nay: 26–27	Motion defeated.
John C. Breckinridge	May 18, 1858	Motion to postpone the special orders of the day prior to S. 239 (statehood of Oregon).	Yea: 29-28	Motion agreed to. Bill passed.
John C. Breckinridge	June 7, 1858	Toombs amendment to Seward amendment to H.R. 42 (granting a pension to Mary A. M. Jones) limiting the pension of Myra Clark Gaines to not more than $50 per month.	Yea: 25-24	Motion agreed to.
John C. Breckinridge	December 15, 1858	Motion to consider H.R. 2 (a version of the Morrill Land-Grant Acts).	Nay: 24–25	Motion defeated.
John C. Breckinridge	February 17, 1859	Motion to resume consideration of H.R. 666 ("making appropriations for the consular and diplomatic expenses of the government").	Yea: 29-28	Motion agreed to. Senate resumed consideration of the bill.
John C. Breckinridge	April 11, 1860	Motion to consider S. 10 ("An act to promote the progress of the useful arts").	Nay: 19–20	Motion defeated.
John C. Breckinridge	February 21, 1861	Motion to consider executive business.	Yea: 27-26	Motion agreed to. Senate proceeded to consider executive business.
John C. Breckinridge	February 28, 1861	Motion "that the doors be opened."	Nay: 25–26	Motion defeated.
John C. Breckinridge	March 2, 1861	Pugh amendment to H.R. (proposed constitutional amendment that was part of the Crittenden Compromise).	Yea: 20-19	Amendment agreed to. The vote was later reconsidered and the amendment defeated.
Hannibal Hamlin	March 12, 1862	Rice amendment striking out a section of S. 175 ("to define the pay and emoluments of certain officers of the army and for other purposes").	Nay: 20–21	Amendment defeated.
Hannibal Hamlin	March 17, 1862	Postponing consideration of the nomination of Edwin D. Morgan as major-general of volunteers.	Yea: 20-19	Consideration postponed. Morgan's nomination was confirmed on April 15, 1862.
Hannibal Hamlin	March 24, 1862	Committee amendment to S. 108 ("for the release of certain persons held to service or labor in the District of Columbia").	Nay: 19–20	Amendment defeated
Hannibal Hamlin	January 14, 1863	Fessenden amendment to H.R. 226 (amending "An act to establish a court for the investigation of claims against the United States").	Nay: 20–21	Amendment defeated
Hannibal Hamlin	February 3, 1863	Wilson amendment to S. 365 ("settlement of the accounts of Isaac R. Diller").	Yea: 33-32	Amendment agreed to.
Hannibal Hamlin	February 28, 1865	Committee amendment to H.R. 744 (to amend the Revenue Act of 1864).	Yea: 21-20	Amendment agreed to.
Hannibal Hamlin	March 1, 1865	Committee amendment to H.R. 744.	Yea: 21-20	Amendment agreed to.
Andrew Johnson	No votes			
Schuyler Colfax	December 8, 1869	Motion to reconsider the vote adopting a resolution requiring the Sergeant-at-Arms to remove anyone not entitled to the floor from the chamber prior to the time of meeting.	Yea:27-26	Motion agreed to. The resolution was amended and adopted.
Schuyler Colfax	February 14, 1870	Motion to postpone the consideration of H.R. 1096 (to admit the State of Mississippi to representation in the Congress of the United States) until the next day.	Nay: 24–25	Motion defeated.
Schuyler Colfax	March 11, 1870	Motion to postpone indefinitely a resolution to appoint "A Joint Special Committee on Indian Affairs."	Nay: 27–28	Motion defeated. Consideration of the resolution postponed until the next day.
Schuyler Colfax	March 15, 1870	Motion to table the resolution to appoint a Joint Special Committee on Indian Affairs.	Nay: 30–31	Motion defeated. Consideration of the resolution postponed until the next day.
Schuyler Colfax	March 29, 1870	Motion to pass over the resolution to appoint a Joint Special Committee on Indian Affairs.	Yea: 30-29	Resolution passed over.
Schuyler Colfax	May 23, 1870	Sumner amendment to H.R. 974 (appropriations bill) to authorize and appropriate up to $100,000 for expeditions toward the North Pole.	Yea: 26-25	Amendment passed.
Schuyler Colfax	June 7, 1870	Motion to table a resolution to direct the Committee on Foreign Relations "to inquire into the conduct of certain agents connected with the negotiation of the treaty for the annexation of the Dominican Republic" and the condition of its debt and lands.	Yea: 20-19	Resolution tabled.
Schuyler Colfax	February 17, 1871	Trumbull amendment, made in Committee of the Whole, to H.R. 2524 (appropriations bill) to repeal an appropriation "for the payment of judgments to be rendered by the Court of Claims."	Yea: 26-25	Amendment passed.
Schuyler Colfax	February 20, 1871	Concurring with the Trumbull amendment to H.R. 2524.	Yea: 28-27	Amendment passed.
Schuyler Colfax	March 22, 1871	Casserly amendment adding the words "and also all bills relating to the repeal of the income tax" to Trumbull amendment to a resolution setting "the legislative business to be considered by the Senate during the present session."	Nay: 27–28	Amendment defeated. Trumbull amendment also defeated.
Schuyler Colfax	February 9, 1872	Sumner amendment adding multiple civil rights provisions to H.R. 380 ("for the removal of legal and political disabilities imposed by" Section 3 of the Fourteenth Amendment).	Yea: 29-28	Amendment passed. The bill did not receive the two-thirds majority required for passage.
Schuyler Colfax	April 24, 1872	Motion to table Morill amendment to H.R. 1654 ("making appropriations to supply deficiencies in the appropriations for the service of the Government for the fiscal year ending June 30, 1872, and for former years, and for other purposes") regarding the jurisdiction of the Court of Claims.	Nay: 25–26	Motion defeated.
Schuyler Colfax	April 30, 1872	Motion to reconsider a vote disagreeing with an amendment to H.R 1654 jurisdiction of the Court of Claims.	Yea: 27-26	Motion to reconsider agreed to.
Schuyler Colfax	April 30, 1872	Agreeing with the proposed amendment to H.R. 1654.	Yea: 27-26	Amendment passed.
Schuyler Colfax	May 9, 1872	Trumbull amendment to H.R. 1050 ("for the removal of legal and political disabilities imposed by" Section 3 of the Fourteenth Amendment).	Nay: 29–30	Amendment defeated.
Schuyler Colfax	May 9, 1872	Vickers amendment to H.R. 1050.	Yea: 22-21	Amendment passed.
Schuyler Colfax	May 9, 1872	Sumner amendment to H.R. 1050.	Yea: 29-28	Amendment passed. The bill did not receive the two-thirds majority required for passage.
Schuyler Colfax	February 15, 1873	Thurman amendment to a resolution regarding what motions would be in order during the current session.	Nay: 23–24	Amendment defeated.
Henry Wilson	March 2, 1875	H.R. 3341 ("to equalize the bounties of soldiers who served in the late war for the Union.")	Yea: 31-30	Bill passed, but was pocket-vetoed by President Grant.
William A. Wheeler	November 22, 1877	Motion to adjourn.	Yea: 32-31	Senate adjourned until the following Monday at noon.
William A. Wheeler	November 26, 1877	Motion to move to executive session.	Yea: 30-29	Senate went into executive session.
William A. Wheeler	November 28, 1877	Motion to consider a report from the Committee on Privileges and Elections in the case of William Pitt Kellogg of Louisiana.	Yea: 30-29	Senate proceeded to discussion of the report. "Although this vote did not directly determine the question of admitting to Senate membership in the matter of a disputed seat, it led the way to an intelligent, though inconclusive, discussion of the question of the Vice-President's right to cast his vote in such an issue"
William A. Wheeler	November 28, 1877	Thurman amendment to reject Kellogg.	Nay 30–31	Amendment defeated. Kellogg began his term in the Senate on March 4, 1877
William A. Wheeler	December 20, 1878	Motion to move to executive session.	Yea: 26-25	Senate went into executive session.
William A. Wheeler	January 31, 1879	Motion to adjourn. This motion was made while in executive session.	Yea: 21-20	Senate adjourned.
Chester A. Arthur	March 18, 1881	The Republican minority in the Senate was attempting to secure their slate of standing committees. Senator Anthony moved to indefinitely postpone the resolution of Sen. Pendleton to appoint the Democratic slate standing committees of the Senate.	Yea: 38-37	Democratic resolution postponed.
Chester A. Arthur	March 18, 1881	Resolution to adopt the Republican organization of the standing committees.	Yea: 38-37	Republican resolution adopted.
Chester A. Arthur	March 24, 1881	Motion to proceed to executive session.	Nay: 32–33	Motion defeated.
Thomas A. Hendricks	No votes			
Levi P. Morton	January 14, 1891	Motion to proceed to consideration of H.R. 11045 (the Lodge Bill).	Yea: 34-33	The bill was laid before the Senate, but it never became law.
Levi P. Morton	January 16, 1891	Motion to table Reagan amendment to H.R. 11045.	Yea: 31-30	Amendment tabled.
Levi P. Morton	December 15, 1892	Motion that after adjourning that day, the Senate would meet on the following Monday.	Yea: 28-27	Motion agreed to.
Levi P. Morton	February 9, 1893	Motion that after adjourning that day, the Senate would meet at noon the next day.	Yea: 31-30	Motion agreed to.
Adlai E. Stevenson	February 15, 1894	Passage of H.R. 3606 ("to require railroad companies operating railroads in the Territories over a right of way granted by the Government to establish stations and depots at all town sites on the lines of said roads established by the Interior Department.")	Yea: 28-27	Bill passed.
Adlai E. Stevenson	August 11, 1894	Motion that the Senate proceed to executive session.	Yea: 36-35	Senate proceeded to executive session.
Garret Hobart	February 14, 1899	Bacon amendment to joint resolution S.R. 240 (stating the intentions of the United States toward the Philippine Islands after the ratification of the treaty of peace with Spain) expanding the resolution to disclaim any intention of exercising permanent sovereignty over the islands.	Nay: 29–30	Amendment defeated. Joint resolution passed.
Theodore Roosevelt	No votes			
Charles W. Fairbanks	No votes			
James S. Sherman	February 2, 1911	Gallinger amendment to S. 6708 (ocean mail subsidy bill) authorizing the Postmaster General to pay for certain ocean mail services.	Yea: 40-39	Amendment passed.
James S. Sherman	February 2, 1911	Passage of S. 6708.	Yea: 40-39	Passed.
James S. Sherman	February 2, 1911	Adjournment for the day.	Yea: 38-37	Senate adjourned for the day.
James S. Sherman	June 12, 1911	Bristow amendment to H. J. Res. 39 (the Seventeenth Amendment) removing the "race rider" and retaining the power of the federal government to supervise senatorial elections.	Yea: 45-44	Amendment passed.
Thomas R. Marshall	December 19, 1913	Brandegee amendment to a committee amendment to H.R. 7837 (Federal Reserve Act)	Nay: 43–44	Amendment defeated. H.R. 7837 passed and enacted.
Thomas R. Marshall	March 19, 1914	Motion to consider S. J. Res. 41 ("authorizing the Secretary of the Interior to sell or lease certain public lands to the Republic Coal Co.")	Yea: 28-27	Motion agreed to. The Senate proceeded to consider S. J. Res. 41.
Thomas R. Marshall	May 19, 1914	Motion to adjourn after the Sergeant at Arms was "directed to request the attendance of absent Senators" since a quorum was not present.	Nay: 17–18	The Senate did not adjourn at that time. A quorum was established when more senators arrived in the chamber.
Thomas R. Marshall	August 17, 1914	Thomas amendment to H.R. 15657 (Clayton Antitrust Act of 1914)	Yea: 24-23	Amendment passed. H.R. 15657 passed and enacted.
Thomas R. Marshall	February 12, 1915	Motion to consider the motion from Senator Reed to amend Senate rules to end debate on S. 6856 ("to authorize the United States ... to purchase, construct, equip, maintain, and operate merchant vessels in the foreign trade of the United States")	Yea: 48-47	The Senate considered the motion to limit debate. Cloture procedures were eventually established in 1917.
Thomas R. Marshall	February 15, 1915	The vice president had ruled that Senator Reed was entitled to move to table a motion to amend Senate Rule XXII regarding limitation of debate and all the amendments to that motion. Senator Lodge appealed the ruling.	Yea: 46-45	The ruling of the vice president was sustained. The Senate proceeded to consider Senator Reed's motion.
Thomas R. Marshall	February 15, 1915	Motion to table the motion to amend Senate Rule XXII regarding limitation of debate and all the amendments to that motion.	Yea: 46-45	Motion tabled.
Thomas R. Marshall	February 2, 1916	Clarke amendment to S. 381 (Philippine Autonomy Act).	Yea: 42-41	Amendment passed. S. 381 passed and enacted.
Thomas R. Marshall	February 14, 1919	Motion to table the motion from Senator Johnson to suspend consideration of H.R. 13462 ("making appropriations for the construction, repair, and preservation of certain public works on rivers and harbors") to consider S. Res. 411 (regarding withdrawing U.S. soldiers from Russia).	Yea: 34-33	Motion tabled. The Senate resumed consideration of H.R. 13462.
Calvin Coolidge	No votes			
Charles G. Dawes	May 21, 1928	Simmons amendment to H.R. 1 (Revenue Act of 1928) "relating to graduated income taxes."	Nay: 33–34	Amendment defeated. H.R. 1 passed and enacted.
Charles G. Dawes	May 28, 1928	Concurrent resolution (H. Con. Res. 41) "to close the first session of the Seventieth Congress by adjourning" both houses on May 29.	Nay: 40–41	Resolution defeated. On May 29, the Senate voted on another resolution (S. Con. Res. 22) to adjourn later that day. The resolution passed, and the Senate adjourned at 5:30 pm, ending the session of Congress.
Charles Curtis	March 12, 1930	Committee amendment to H.R. 2667 (Smoot–Hawley Tariff Act) to reduced proposed tariffs on plate glass.	Nay: 36–37	Amendment defeated.
Charles Curtis	March 13, 1930	Committee amendment to H.R. 2667 (Smoot–Hawley Tariff Act) to reduced proposed tariffs on spring clothespins.	Yea: 41-40	Amendment passed. H.R. 2667 passed and enacted.
Charles Curtis	May 19, 1930	On part of resolution S. 270, relieving the majority members of a conference committee of their promise in regard to the flexible provision of the tariff bill H.R. 2667.	Yea: 43-42	Majority members of the committee relieved of their promise.
John Nance Garner	June 2, 1933	Trammell amendment, as amended by Sen. Connally, to H.R. 5389 (Independent Offices Appropriations) limiting potential reductions of war veterans' pensions and providing that "Spanish-American War veterans shall not be required to make proof of service-connected disability."	Yea: 43-42	Amendment passed.
John Nance Garner	April 17, 1934	Motion to proceed to the consideration of S. 2018 (relative to Members of Congress acting as attorneys in matters where the United States has an interest).	Yea: 32-31	Motion agreed to. The Senate proceeded to consider the bill.
John Nance Garner	February 6, 1940	Committee amendment to H.R. 7922 (Independent Offices Appropriations) to reduce the line item "general administration" for the Civil Aeronautics Authority budget from $1,659,191 to $1,543,932.	Yea: 35-34	Committee amendment passed.
Henry A. Wallace	June 26, 1942	McCarran amendment to H.R. 7181 (appropriation bill for the Department of Labor and Federal Security Agency).	Yea: 33-32	Amendment passed.
Henry A. Wallace	June 26, 1942	Motion to table a motion to reconsider the vote by which the Senate agreed to the McCarran amendment to H.R. 7181.	Yea: 33-32	Motion to table agreed to.
Henry A. Wallace	July 16, 1942	Committee amendment to H. R. 7319 (making supplemental appropriations for the national defense for the fiscal year ending June 30, 1943).	Nay: 30–31	Committee amendment rejected.
Henry A. Wallace	July 17, 1942	Amendment to H.R. 6999 (Act authorizing the construction of a Florida Pipe Line and Barge Canal).	Nay: 30–31	Amendment defeated.
Harry S. Truman	April 10, 1945	Taft amendment to H.R. 2013 (Lend-Lease Extension Act of 1945) to block the postwar delivery of Lend-Lease Act items contracted for during World War II.	Nay: 39–40	Amendment defeated.
Alben W. Barkley	September 15, 1949	Motion to reconsider the vote by which the Senate agreed to the McCarthy amendment to H.R. 1211 (Trade Agreements Extension Act of 1949) to direct the president to establish import quotas on furs and fur products.	Yea: 42–41	Motion agreed to. The amendment was defeated in the re-vote.
Alben W. Barkley	September 15, 1949	Motion to table the motion to reconsider the vote by which the Senate agreed to the McCarthy amendment to H.R. 1211 (Trade Agreements Extension Act of 1949).	Nay: 41–42	Motion defeated. H.R. 1211 passed and enacted without amendments added. The reciprocal trade agreements program is extended to 1951.
Alben W. Barkley	October 4, 1949	Motion to table the motion to reconsider the vote by which the Senate rejected the Young-Russell amendment to H.R. 5345 (Agricultural Act of 1949) to make mandatory price support at 90% parity on cotton, wheat, corn, rice, peanuts.	Nay: 37–38	Motion defeated. The Young-Russell amendment is reconsidered for a new roll call vote.
Alben W. Barkley	October 4, 1949	Young-Russell amendment to H.R. 5345 (Agricultural Act of 1949) to make mandatory price support at 90% parity on cotton, wheat, corn, rice, peanuts. (This was a re-vote after the motion to reconsider the original defeat of the amendment was passed.)	Yea: 38–37	Amendment passed. This amendment was later changed in a compromise with the House version. H.R. 5345 was passed and enacted.
Alben W. Barkley	May 3, 1950	Motion to substitute the Senate Democratic Policy Committee amendment to S.Res. 202 (Nationwide Investigation into Organized Crime Act) to provide for an investigation into gambling and racketeering interstate crime by a special five-member committee called the "Special Committee to Investigate Crime in Interstate Commerce" who would be selected by the vice president. The group's composition would be three Democrats and two Republicans.	Yea: 36–35	Motion agreed to. The Senate Democratic Policy Committee plan replaced the original S.Res. 202 and S.Res. 202 was passed.
Alben W. Barkley	June 5, 1950	Conference bill of H.R. 5332 (Foreign-Trade Zones Amendment Act of 1950) to ease restrictions on assembling and processing of foreign goods in the "foreign-trade zones" which the original Act set up in major U.S. ports.	Yea: 31–30	H.R. 5332 passed and enacted.
Alben W. Barkley	June 26, 1950	Conference bill of H.R. 6567 (Commodity Credit Corporation Amendment Act of 1950) to increase the Commodity Credit Corporation's borrowing authority by $2 billion and other farm-related amendments.	Yea: 36–35	H.R. 6567 passed and enacted.
Alben W. Barkley	June 4, 1952	Ives amendment to S. 2954 (Defense Production Act Amendments of 1952) to maintain the same equal membership of the Wage Stabilization Board between labor, industry, and the public. The WSB would only be permitted to mediate only in wage disputes.	Yea: 42–41	Amendment passed. A later amendment during conference committee that was included in the final bill changed the composition of the WSB from equal representation between labor, industry, and the public to the board having more representation from the public.
Richard Nixon	June 18, 1953	Motion to proceed to the consideration of the conference report of S. 1081 (Defense Production Act Amendments of 1953).	Yea: 40–39	Motion agreed to.
Richard Nixon	June 18, 1953	Motion to table the motion to reconsider the vote by which the Senate agreed to proceed with the consideration of the conference report of S. 1081 (Defense Production Act Amendments of 1953).	Yea: 42–41	Motion agreed to. The conference report of S. 1081 moves forward.
Richard Nixon	March 9, 1956	Aiken amendment to delete from H.R. 12 (Agricultural Act of 1956) 90% rigid mandatory price supports for millable varieties of wheat of 1956 crops.	Yea: 46–45	Amendment passed, but the final bill was unpalatable to everybody. Vetoed by President Eisenhower.
Richard Nixon	May 29, 1956	Knowland amendment to H.R. 10660 (Federal Aid Highway Act of 1956) to permit state agencies to determine prevailing wages for projects in the Interstate Highway System.	Yea: 40–39	Passed, but during conference committee the Knowland amendment wasn't included in the final bill.
Richard Nixon	March 12, 1958	Motion to table the motion to reconsider the vote on the Monroney amendment to delete the interest rate ceiling hike on American GI mortgages from 4.5% to 4.75% in S. 3418 (Emergency Housing Bill)	Yea: 48–47	Motion agreed to. GI mortgages now had an interest rate ceiling of 4.75%
Richard Nixon	April 22, 1959	Motion to table the motion to reconsider the vote on the McClellan amendment to S. 1555 (Labor Management Reporting and Disclosure Act of 1959) to add a bill of rights for union members to include guarantees of freedom of speech and periodic secret elections of officers.	Yea: 46–45	Motion agreed to. A bill of rights for union workers was included in the final bill that was passed and enacted.
Richard Nixon	February 3, 1960	Motion to table the motion to reconsider the vote on the Clark amendment to S. 8 (Emergency Federal Assistance for School Construction Act) to authorize $1.1 billion per year of federal funds for an indefinite period for school construction and teachers' salaries.	Yea: 45–44	Motion agreed to. A scaled-down version of the federal education funds passed later.
Richard Nixon	May 2, 1960	Gruening amendment to H.R. 11510 (Mutual Security Act of 1960) to prevent the president from using contingency funds to help replace cuts Congress may make later in other aid funds.	Nay: 44–45	Amendment defeated.
Lyndon B. Johnson	No votes			
Hubert Humphrey	August 17, 1965	Motion to reconsider the vote rejecting the Fannin amendment to keep governors' full veto rights over three anti-poverty programs (work-training, community action and adult education) intact in H.R. 8283 (Economic Opportunity Amendments of 1965).	Nay: 45–46	Motion defeated. The Senate version of a full repeal of veto rights was rejected eventually. The House version's limited repeal of veto rights was included in the final bill.
Hubert Humphrey	September 13, 1965	Bass amendment to H.R. 9811 (Food and Agriculture Act of 1965) to strike from the bill a provision transferring from the Secretary of Labor to the Secretary of Agriculture authority to determine whether foreign farm workers are required by U.S. farmers.	Yea: 46–45	H.R. 9811 was passed and enacted.
Hubert Humphrey	May 9, 1967	Gore-Williams amendment to H.R. 6950 (Restoring the Investment Tax Credit and the Allowance of Accelerated Depreciation in the Case of Certain Real Property Act) to make the 1966 Presidential Election Campaign Fund Act inoperative after September 15, 1967.	Nay: 48–49	Eventually H.R. 6950 was passed and enacted but with an amendment to make the 1966 Presidential Election Campaign Fund Act inoperative.
Hubert Humphrey	March 11, 1968	Clark amendment to H.R. 15399 (Urgent Supplemental Appropriations Act) to appropriate $25 million for the Office of Economic Opportunity's Head Start Program.	Yea: 43–42	H.R. 15399 died in Congress. The $25 million funding for Head Start was approved in a different bill.
Spiro Agnew	August 6, 1969	Smith amendment to prohibit funding for the Safeguard anti-ballistic missile program	Nay: 50–51	The Safeguard anti-ballistic missile program was authorized and came into fruition.
Spiro Agnew	July 17, 1973	Motion to table the motion to reconsider the Gravel-Stevens amendment to S. 1081 (Trans-Alaska Pipeline Authorization Act) that states that the Interior Department has met all the requirements of the National Environmental Policy Act for the Trans-Alaska Pipeline project.	Yea: 50–49	Motion agreed to. The Trans-Alaska Pipeline Authorization Act was ultimately passed and enacted in November 1973. The act authorized construction of the Trans-Alaska Pipeline.
Gerald Ford	No votes			
Nelson Rockefeller	No votes			
Walter Mondale	November 4, 1977	Motion to table the Curtis amendment to H.R. 9346 (Social Security Tax Act of 1977) to continue the tradition of employers and employees paying equal shares of Social Security taxes.	Yea: 42–41	Motion agreed to.
George H. W. Bush	July 13, 1983	Motion to table Pryor Amdt.1468 on nerve gas	Yea: 50–49	Motion agreed to.
George H. W. Bush	November 8, 1983	Stevens/Tower/Goldwater Amdt.2517 on nerve gas	Yea: 47–46	Agreed to.
George H. W. Bush	June 14, 1984	Motion to table Moynihan Amdt.3208 on MX missiles	Yea: 49–48	Motion agreed to.
George H. W. Bush	May 10, 1985	Dole Amdt.93 on cutting deficit	Yea: 50–49	Agreed to.
George H. W. Bush	July 23, 1986	Motion to reconsider vote on Manion nomination	Nay: 49–50	Motion defeated so Manion remained confirmed.
George H. W. Bush	August 7, 1986	Pryor Amdt.2612 on nerve gas	Nay: 50–51	Amendment defeated.
George H. W. Bush	September 22, 1987	Motion to table Johnston Amdt.710 on SDI funding	Yea: 51–50	Motion agreed to.
Dan Quayle	No votes			
Al; Gore	June 25, 1993	H.R. 2264 (Omnibus Budget Reconciliation Act of 1993)	Yea: 50–49	Conference Report (see below) enacted as Pub. L. 103–66.
Al; Gore	August 6, 1993	H.R. 2264 (Omnibus Budget Reconciliation Act of 1993) Conference Report	Yea: 51–50	Enacted. Pub. L. 103–66
Al; Gore	August 3, 1994	Motion to table S.Amdt. 2446 (Johnston Ethanol Limitation Amendment) to H.R. 4624 (Departments of Veterans Affairs and Housing and Urban Development, and Independent Agencies Appropriations Act of 1995)	Yea: 51–50	S.Amdt. 2446 tabled.
Al; Gore	May 20, 1999	S.Amdt. 362 (Lautenberg Gun Show Sales Amendment) to S. 254 (School Safety Act of 1999)	Yea: 51–50	S. 254 returned to Senate by House via blue slip. Expired at end of session.
Dick Cheney	April 3, 2001	S.Amdt. 173 (Grassley Prescription Drug Reserve Fund Amendment) to H.Con.Res. 83 (2002 budget)	Yea: 51–50	Agreed to.
Dick Cheney	April 5, 2001	S.Amdt. 347 (Hutchison Marriage Penalty Tax Elimination Amendment) to H.Con.Res. 83 (2002 budget)	Yea: 51–50	Agreed to.
Dick Cheney	May 21, 2002	Motion to table S.Amdt. 3406 (Allen Mortgage Loan Amendment) to H.R. 3009 (Trade Act of 2002)	Yea: 50–49	Motion agreed to.
Dick Cheney	April 11, 2003	H.Con.Res. 95 (2004 budget)	Yea: 51–50	Enacted.
Dick Cheney	May 15, 2003	S.Amdt. 664 (Nickles Dividend Exclusion Amendment) to S. 1054 (Jobs and Growth Tax Relief Reconciliation Act of 2003)	Yea: 51–50	S. 1054 incorporated into H.R. 2 (see below), which was enacted as Pub. L. 108–27 (text) (PDF).
Dick Cheney	May 23, 2003	H.R. 2 (Jobs and Growth Tax Relief Reconciliation Act of 2003) Conference Report	Yea: 51–50	Enacted. Pub. L. 108–27 (text) (PDF)
Dick Cheney	December 21, 2005	Motion to concur in the House amendment to S. 1932 with an amendment (Personal Responsibility, Work, and Family Promotion Act of 2005)	Yea: 51–50	Motion agreed to. Bill enacted, Pub. L. 109–171 (text) (PDF).
Dick Cheney	March 13, 2008	Motion to reconsider S.Amdt. 4189 to S.Con.Res. 70	Yea: 51–50	Motion agreed to.
Joe; Biden	No votes			
Mike Pence	February 7, 2017	PN37 (Nomination of Elisabeth Prince DeVos, of Michigan, to be Secretary of Education)	Yea: 51–50	Nomination confirmed.
Mike Pence	March 30, 2017	Motion to proceed to H.J.Res. 43	Yea: 51–50	Motion agreed to.
Mike Pence	March 30, 2017	H.J.Res. 43 (Providing for congressional disapproval under chapter 8 of title 5, United States Code, of the final rule submitted by Secretary of Health and Human Services relating to compliance with Title X requirements by project recipients in selecting subrecipients)	Yea: 51–50	Enacted. Pub. L. 115–23 (text) (PDF)
Mike Pence	July 25, 2017	Motion to proceed to H.R. 1628 (American Health Care Act of 2017)	Yea: 51–50	Motion agreed to.
Mike Pence	October 24, 2017	H.J.Res. 111 (Providing for congressional disapproval under chapter 8 of title 5, United States Code, of the rule submitted by Bureau of Consumer Financial Protection relating to "Arbitration Agreements")	Yea: 51–50	Enacted. Pub. L. 115–74 (text) (PDF)
Mike Pence	December 2, 2017	S.Amdt. 1852 (Cruz 529 Savings Plan Amendment) to H.R. 1 (Tax Cuts and Jobs Act)	Yea: 51–50	Agreed to.
Mike Pence	January 24, 2018	Motion to invoke cloture on PN1341 (Nomination of Sam Brownback, of Kansas, to be United States Ambassador-at-Large for International Religious Freedom)	Yea: 50–49	Motion agreed to.
Mike Pence	January 24, 2018	PN1341 (Nomination of Sam Brownback, of Kansas, to be United States Ambassador-at-Large for International Religious Freedom)	Yea: 50–49	Nomination confirmed.
Mike Pence	February 28, 2018	PN367 (Nomination of Russell Vought, of Virginia, to be Deputy Director of the Office of Management and Budget)	Yea: 50–49	Nomination confirmed.
Mike Pence	November 28, 2018	Motion to invoke cloture on PN1412 (Nomination of Thomas Farr, of North Carolina, to be United States District Judge for the Eastern District of North Carolina)	Yea: 51–50	Motion agreed to.
Mike Pence	November 29, 2018	Motion to invoke cloture on PN2117 (Nomination of Jonathan A. Kobes, of South Dakota, to be United States Circuit Judge for the Eighth Circuit)	Yea: 50–49	Motion agreed to.
Mike Pence	December 11, 2018	PN2117 (Nomination of Jonathan A. Kobes, of South Dakota, to be United States Circuit Judge for the Eighth Circuit)	Yea: 51–50	Nomination confirmed.
Mike Pence	December 21, 2018	Motion to proceed to the House Message to accompany H.R. 695 (Department of Defense Appropriations Act, 2018; a legislative vehicle used to fund various government departments.)	Yea: 48–47	Motion agreed to.
Kamala Harris	February 5, 2021	S.Amdt. 888 (Schumer amendment, in the nature of a substitute) to S.Con.Res. 5	Yea: 51–50	Amendment agreed to.
Kamala Harris	February 5, 2021	S.Con.Res. 5 (as amended): a concurrent resolution setting forth the congressional budget for the United States Government for fiscal year 2021 and setting forth the appropriate budgetary levels for fiscal years 2022 through 2030	Yea: 51–50	Concurrent resolution adopted.
Kamala Harris	March 4, 2021	Motion to proceed to H.R. 1319, the American Rescue Plan Act of 2021	Yea: 51–50	Motion agreed to.
Kamala Harris	April 21, 2021	Motion to discharge PN79-6 (Nomination of Colin Hackett Kahl, of California, to be Under Secretary of Defense for Policy)	Yea: 51–50	Motion agreed to.
Kamala Harris	June 22, 2021	Motion to invoke cloture on PN220 (Nomination of Kiran Arjandas Ahuja, of Massachusetts, to be Director of the Office of Personnel Management for a term of four years)	Yea: 51–50	Motion agreed to.
Kamala Harris	June 22, 2021	PN220 (Nomination of Kiran Arjandas Ahuja, of Massachusetts, to be Director of the Office of Personnel Management for a term of four years)	Yea: 51–50	Nomination confirmed.
Kamala Harris	July 20, 2021	Motion to invoke cloture on PN126 (Nomination of Jennifer Ann Abruzzo, of New York, to be General Counsel of the National Labor Relations Board for a term of four years)	Yea: 51–50	Motion agreed to.
Kamala Harris	July 21, 2021	PN126 (Nomination of Jennifer Ann Abruzzo, of New York, to be General Counsel of the National Labor Relations Board for a term of four years)	Yea: 51–50	Nomination confirmed.
Kamala Harris	September 30, 2021	Motion to invoke cloture on PN116 (Nomination of Rohit Chopra, of Washington, D.C., to be Director of the Bureau of Consumer Financial Protection for a term of five years)	Yea: 51–50	Motion agreed to.
Kamala Harris	October 20, 2021	Motion to invoke cloture on PN572 (Nomination of Catherine Elizabeth Lhamon, of California, to be Assistant Secretary for Civil Rights, Department of Education)	Yea: 51–50	Motion agreed to.
Kamala Harris	October 20, 2021	PN572 (Nomination of Catherine Elizabeth Lhamon, of California, to be Assistant Secretary for Civil Rights, Department of Education)	Yea: 51–50	Nomination confirmed.
Kamala Harris	November 3, 2021	Motion to discharge PN807 (Nomination of Jennifer Sung, of Oregon, to be United States Circuit Judge for the Ninth Circuit)	Yea: 50–49	Motion agreed to.
Kamala Harris	November 17, 2021	Motion to invoke cloture on PN604 (Nomination of Brian Eddie Nelson, of California, to be Under Secretary for Terrorism and Financial Crimes)	Yea: 51–50	Motion agreed to.
Kamala Harris	December 8, 2021	Motion to invoke cloture on PN930 (Nomination of Rachael S. Rollins, of Massachusetts, to be United States Attorney for the District of Massachusetts)	Yea: 51–50	Motion agreed to.
Kamala Harris	December 8, 2021	PN930 (Nomination of Rachael S. Rollins, of Massachusetts, to be United States Attorney for the District of Massachusetts)	Yea: 51–50	Nomination confirmed.
Kamala Harris	March 30, 2022	Motion to discharge PN1541 (Nomination of Alvaro M. Bedoya, of Maryland, to be Federal Trade Commissioner for the term of seven years from September 26, 2019)	Yea: 51–50	Motion agreed to.
Kamala Harris	April 5, 2022	Motion to discharge PN1523 (Nomination of Julia Ruth Gordon, of Maryland, to be an Assistant Secretary of Housing and Urban Development)	Yea: 51–50	Motion agreed to.
Kamala Harris	May 10, 2022	PN1679 (Nomination of Lisa DeNell Cook, of Michigan, to be a Member of the Board of Governors of the Federal Reserve System for the unexpired term of fourteen years from February 1, 2010)	Yea: 51–50	Nomination confirmed.
Kamala Harris	May 11, 2022	Motion to invoke cloture on PN1541 (Nomination of Alvaro M. Bedoya, of Maryland, to be Federal Trade Commissioner for the term of seven years from September 26, 2019)	Yea: 51–50	Motion agreed to.
Kamala Harris	May 11, 2022	PN1541 (Nomination of Alvaro M. Bedoya, of Maryland, to be Federal Trade Commissioner for the term of seven years from September 26, 2019)	Yea: 51–50	Nomination confirmed.
Kamala Harris	May 11, 2022	Motion to invoke cloture on PN1523 (Nomination of Julia Ruth Gordon, of Maryland, to be Assistant Secretary of Housing and Urban Development)	Yea: 51–50	Motion agreed to.
Kamala Harris	May 11, 2022	PN1523 (Nomination of Julia Ruth Gordon, of Maryland, to be Assistant Secretary of Housing and Urban Development)	Yea: 51–50	Nomination confirmed.
Kamala Harris	May 12, 2022	Motion to discharge PN1542 (Nomination of Mary T. Boyle, of Maryland, to be a Commissioner of the Consumer Product Safety Commission)	Yea: 51–50	Motion agreed to.
Kamala Harris	August 6, 2022	Motion to proceed to H.R. 5376, the legislative vehicle for the Inflation Reduction Act of 2022	Yea: 51–50	Motion agreed to.
Kamala Harris	August 7, 2022	S.Amdt. 5488 to H.R. 5376, the Inflation Reduction Act of 2022	Yea: 51–50	Amendment agreed to.
Kamala Harris	August 7, 2022	H.R. 5376, the Inflation Reduction Act of 2022	Yea: 51–50	H.R. 5376 passed, as amended.
Kamala Harris	February 28, 2023	PN76 (Nomination of Araceli Martínez-Olguín, of California, to be United States District Judge for the Northern District of California)	Yea: 49–48	Nomination confirmed.
Kamala Harris	February 28, 2023	Motion to invoke cloture on PN77 (Nomination of Margaret R. Guzman, of Massachusetts, to be United States District Judge for the District of Massachusetts)	Yea: 49–48	Motion agreed to.
Kamala Harris	March 1, 2023	PN77 (Nomination of Margaret R. Guzman, of Massachusetts, to be United States District Judge for the District of Massachusetts)	Yea: 49–48	Nomination confirmed.
Kamala Harris	June 21, 2023	Motion to invoke cloture on PN82 (Nomination of Natasha C. Merle, of New York, to be United States District Judge for the Eastern District of New York)	Yea: 51–50	Motion agreed to.
Kamala Harris	July 12, 2023	Motion to invoke cloture on PN64 (Nomination of Kalpana Kotagal, of Ohio, to be a Member of the Equal Employment Opportunity Commission for a term expiring July 1, 2027)	Yea: 51–50	Motion agreed to. Kotagal was confirmed the next day (July 13).
Kamala Harris	December 5, 2023	Motion to invoke cloture on PN588 (Nomination of Loren L. AliKhan, of the District of Columbia, to be United States District Judge for the District of Columbia)	Yea: 51–50	Motion agreed to.
Kamala Harris	December 5, 2023	PN588 (Nomination of Loren L. AliKhan, of the District of Columbia, to be United States District Judge for the District of Columbia)	Yea: 51–50	Nomination confirmed.
JD; Vance	January 24, 2025	PN11-7 (Nomination of Peter Hegseth, of Tennessee, to be Secretary of Defense)	Yea: 51–50	Nomination confirmed.
JD; Vance	April 30, 2025	Motion to table S.J.Res.49 (A joint resolution terminating the national emergency declared to impose global tariffs.)	Yea: 50–49	Motion tabled.
JD; Vance	July 1, 2025	S.Amdt. 2848 to S.Amdt. 2360 to H.R. 1, the One Big Beautiful Bill Act	Yea: 51–50	Amendment agreed to.
JD; Vance	July 1, 2025	S.Amdt. 2360 to H.R. 1, the One Big Beautiful Bill Act	Yea: 51–50	Amendment agreed to, as amended.
JD; Vance	July 1, 2025	H.R. 1, the One Big Beautiful Bill Act	Yea: 51–50	H.R. 1 passed, as amended.
JD; Vance	July 15, 2025	Motion to discharge H.R. 4, the Rescissions Act of 2025	Yea: 51–50	Motion agreed to.
JD; Vance	July 15, 2025	Motion to proceed to H.R. 4, the Rescissions Act of 2025	Yea: 51–50	Motion agreed to.
JD; Vance	January 14, 2026	Point of order on S.J.Res. 98 (A joint resolution terminating military actions against Venezuela.)	Yea: 51–50	Point of order sustained.
