= Lyman S. Kidder =

American military officer

Second Lieutenant Lyman Stockwell Kidder
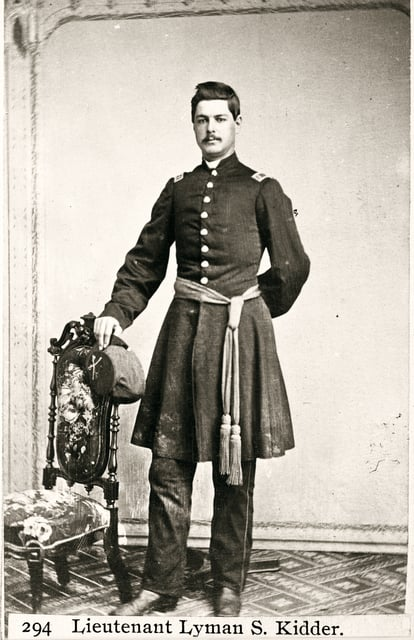
- Lieutenant Kidder, photographed by Joel Emmons Whitney
- Born: August 31, 1842; Braintree, Vermont
- Died: July 2, 1867 (aged 24); Near Goodland, Kansas
- Cause of death: Killed by Lakota and Cheyenne
- Burial place: Oakland Cemetery; Saint Paul, Minnesota
- Military career
- Allegiance: United States; Minnesota
- Branch: Union Army; United States Army
- Service years: 1864-1867
- Rank: Second Lieutenant
- Commands: Company E, Hatch's Minnesota Cavalry Battalion; Company M, 2nd Cavalry Regiment
- Known for: Kidder fight
- Conflicts: Sioux Wars; Hancock's War; Kidder fight †

Lyman Stockwell Kidder (August 31, 1842 - July 2, 1867) was a military officer who served during the American Civil War and American Indian Wars. He was part of the Kidder family, an American political family. He was the son of Judge Jefferson P. Kidder and the uncle of Arizona Ranger Jeff Kidder. He was killed in the Kidder Fight, also called the Kidder Massacre, during Hancock's War against the Lakota and Cheyenne.

== Early life ==
Lyman Stockwell Kidder was born on August 31, 1842 in Braintree, Vermont, he was the son of Jefferson P. Kidder and Mary Ann Stockwell. Kidder's family moved to Minnesota Territory in 1857 where his father Jefferson became the U.S. District Court Judge for Dakota County, Minnesota from 1865-1876 and 1880-1883.

== Military service ==
=== Hatch's Battalion ===
Following the Dakota War of 1862, Governor of Minnesota Alexander Ramsey called for United States Volunteers to organize in Minnesota in order to assist Brigadier General Henry Hastings Sibley and Alfred Sully in their campaign against the Dakota people. One of these units was Hatch's Minnesota Cavalry Battalion which was led by Edwin Aaron Clark Hatch.

Kidder enlisted into Hatch's Battalion as a Private on August 31, 1864 and was assigned to Company E under the command of Captain George Boyd Jr. and was sent to Pembina and later Fort Abercrombie. Kidder was eventually promoted to the rank of First Sergeant and served until May 1, 1866 when the battalion was mustered out of service. Kidder stayed in the military and was given a field commission to the rank of Second Lieutenant in April 1867, and was transferred from the United States Volunteers into the Regular Army.

=== The Kidder Massacre ===
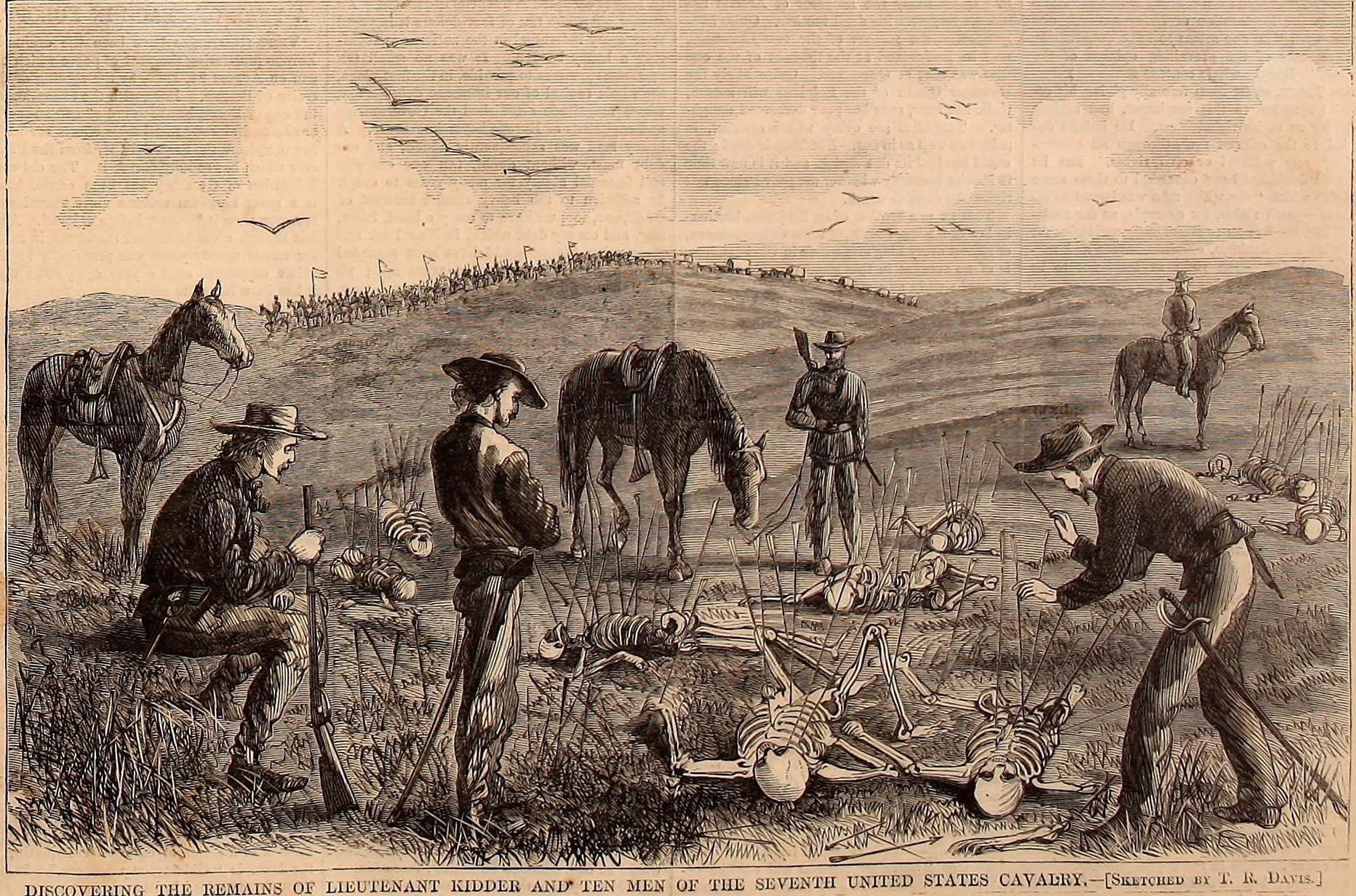
Discovering the remains of Lieutenant Kidder and ten of his men c.1867.

In mid-June, 1867 Kidder was ordered to Fort Sedgwick in Colorado Territory and was attached to Company M of the 2nd Cavalry Regiment. On July 1, 1867 Kidder was placed in charge of a 10-man patrol along with one Sioux Scout named Red Bead and were directed to carrying orders to Lieutenant Colonel George Armstrong Custer who was headquartered nearby north of Fort McPherson, Nebraska on the Platte River.

Kidder's 11-man patrol reached Custer's previous campsite on the evening of July 1, 1867 but found it abandoned, this is because Custer had left his camp the previous day. The next day on July 2, 1867 Kidder's patrol was discovered by a group of Lakota and allied Cheyenne just north of Beaver Creek, a tributary of the Republican River. Noticing the Lakota and Cheyenne, Kidder ordered his men to retreat to the south towards the Beaver Creek valley, however, some were shot off their horses when they fled during the initial skirmish.

The skirmish that resulted from the engagement was called the Kidder fight (also called the Kidder Massacre) after Kidder. The result of the skirmish was the complete destruction of Kidder's 11-man patrol along with their bodies being mutilated. On July 12, 1867 Custer and his detachment discovered the bodies of Kidder and his men, they were originally buried in a mass grave together near where the attack occurred in Sherman County, Kansas.

The bodies of Kidder and his men were later exhumed by Lieutenant Frederick Henry Beecher of the 3rd Infantry Regiment, Beecher was later killed in 1876 during the Battle of Beecher Island. Kidder's remains were then taken to Saint Paul, Minnesota and were buried at the Oakland Cemetery in Saint Paul. The others in Kidder's patrol were buried at Fort Wallace, but in 1886 were removed to the Fort Leavenworth National Cemetery.

== Legacy ==
A historical marker pertaining to the Kidder Fight (Kidder Massacre) exists near Goodland, Kansas in Sherman County. The marker was donated in 1969 by the citizens of the Tri State Area.
