= Justice McConnell =

Justice McConnell may refer to:

- Newton W. McConnell (1832–1915), chief justice of the Montana Supreme Court
- William B. McConnell (1849–1931), associate justice of the South Dakota Territorial Supreme Court

== See also ==
- Judge McConnell (disambiguation)
