= List of United States Supreme Court cases, volume 115 =

Supreme Court of the United States
- Interactive map of Supreme Court of the United States
- 38°53′26″N 77°00′16″W
- Established: March 4, 1789; 236 years ago
- Location: Washington, D.C.
- Coordinates: 38°53′26″N 77°00′16″W
- Composition method: Presidential nomination with Senate confirmation
- Authorised by: Constitution of the United States, Art. III, § 1
- Judge term length: life tenure, subject to impeachment and removal
- Number of positions: 9 (by statute)
- Website: supremecourt.gov

This is a list of cases reported in volume 115 of United States Reports, decided by the Supreme Court of the United States in 1885.

== Justices of the Supreme Court at the time of volume 115 U.S. ==
The Supreme Court is established by Article III, Section 1 of the Constitution of the United States, which says: "The judicial Power of the United States, shall be vested in one supreme Court . . .". The size of the Court is not specified; the Constitution leaves it to Congress to set the number of justices. Under the Judiciary Act of 1789 Congress originally fixed the number of justices at six (one chief justice and five associate justices). Since 1789 Congress has varied the size of the Court from six to seven, nine, ten, and back to nine justices (always including one chief justice).

When the cases in volume 115 U.S. were decided the Court comprised the following nine members:

Portrait	Justice	Office	Home State	Succeeded	Date confirmed by the Senate (Vote)	Tenure on Supreme Court
	Morrison Waite	Chief Justice	Ohio	Salmon P. Chase	January 21, 1874 (63–0)	March 4, 1874 – March 23, 1888 (Died)
	Samuel Freeman Miller	Associate Justice	Iowa	Peter Vivian Daniel	July 16, 1862 (Acclamation)	July 21, 1862 – October 13, 1890 (Died)
	Stephen Johnson Field	Associate Justice	California	newly created seat	March 10, 1863 (Acclamation)	May 10, 1863 – December 1, 1897 (Retired)
	Joseph P. Bradley	Associate Justice	New Jersey	newly created seat	March 21, 1870 (46–9)	March 23, 1870 – January 22, 1892 (Died)
	John Marshall Harlan	Associate Justice	Kentucky	David Davis	November 29, 1877 (Acclamation)	December 10, 1877 – October 14, 1911 (Died)
	William Burnham Woods	Associate Justice	Georgia	William Strong	December 21, 1880 (39–8)	January 5, 1881 – May 14, 1887 (Died)
	Stanley Matthews	Associate Justice	Ohio	Noah Haynes Swayne	May 12, 1881 (24–23)	May 17, 1881 – March 22, 1889 (Died)
	Horace Gray	Associate Justice	Massachusetts	Nathan Clifford	December 20, 1881 (51–5)	January 9, 1882 – September 15, 1902 (Died)
	Samuel Blatchford	Associate Justice	New York	Ward Hunt	March 22, 1882 (Acclamation)	April 3, 1882 – July 7, 1893 (Died)

== Citation style ==
Under the Judiciary Act of 1789 the federal court structure at the time comprised District Courts, which had general trial jurisdiction; Circuit Courts, which had mixed trial and appellate (from the US District Courts) jurisdiction; and the United States Supreme Court, which had appellate jurisdiction over the federal District and Circuit courts—and for certain issues over state courts. The Supreme Court also had limited original jurisdiction (i.e., in which cases could be filed directly with the Supreme Court without first having been heard by a lower federal or state court). There were one or more federal District Courts and/or Circuit Courts in each state, territory, or other geographical region.

Bluebook citation style is used for case names, citations, and jurisdictions.

- "C.C.D." = United States Circuit Court for the District of . . .
  - e.g.,"C.C.D.N.J." = United States Circuit Court for the District of New Jersey
- "D." = United States District Court for the District of . . .
  - e.g.,"D. Mass." = United States District Court for the District of Massachusetts
- "E." = Eastern; "M." = Middle; "N." = Northern; "S." = Southern; "W." = Western
  - e.g.,"C.C.S.D.N.Y." = United States Circuit Court for the Southern District of New York
  - e.g.,"M.D. Ala." = United States District Court for the Middle District of Alabama
- "Ct. Cl." = United States Court of Claims
- The abbreviation of a state's name alone indicates the highest appellate court in that state's judiciary at the time.
  - e.g.,"Pa." = Supreme Court of Pennsylvania
  - e.g.,"Me." = Supreme Judicial Court of Maine

== List of cases in volume 115 U.S. ==
Case Name	Page and year	Opinion of the Court	Concurring opinion(s)	Dissenting opinion(s)	Lower court	Disposition of case
Pacific Railroad Removal Cases	1 (1885)	Bradley	none	Waite	multiple	reversed
Hadden v. Merritt	25 (1885)	Matthews	none	none	C.C.S.D.N.Y.	affirmed
Wheeler and Company v. New Brunswick and Canada Railroad Company	29 (1885)	Miller	none	Blatchford	C.C.D. Conn.	affirmed
Pirie v. Tvedt	41 (1885)	Waite	none	Harlan	C.C.D. Minn.	affirmed
Gwillim v. Donnellan	45 (1885)	Waite	none	none	C.C.D. Colo.	affirmed
Grant v. Parker	51 (1885)	Waite	none	none	C.C.D. Cal.	affirmed
Richter v. Union Trust Company	55 (1885)	Waite	none	none	C.C.W.D. Mich.	motion to take testimony de bene esse in a cause pending in this Court on appeal is denied
Crump v. Thurber	56 (1885)	Blatchford	none	none	C.C.D. Ky.	reversed
Stewart Brothers and Company v. Dunham, Buckley and Company	61 (1885)	Matthews	none	none	C.C.S.D. Miss.	multiple
Ehrhardt v. Hogaboom	67 (1885)	Field	none	none	Cal.	affirmed
The Charles Morgan	69 (1885)	Waite	none	none	C.C.E.D. La.	affirmed
Clark v. Beecher Manufacturing Company	79 (1885)	Blatchford	none	none	C.C.D. Conn.	affirmed
Wollensak v. Reiher	87 (1885)	Matthews	none	none	C.C.N.D. Ill.	affirmed
Frasher v. O'Connor	102 (1885)	Field	none	none	Cal.	affirmed
Gray v. National Steamship Company	116 (1885)	Field	none	none	C.C.S.D.N.Y.	affirmed
Buncombe County v. Tommey	122 (1885)	Harlan	none	none	C.C.W.D.N.C.	affirmed
Mayfield v. Richards	137 (1885)	Woods	none	none	La.	reversed
Smith v. Woolfolk	143 (1885)	Woods	none	none	Ark. Cir. Ct.	affirmed
Philippi v. Philippe	151 (1885)	Woods	none	none	C.C.S.D. Ala.	affirmed
Lámar v. McCulloch	163 (1885)	Blatchford	none	none	C.C.S.D.N.Y.	affirmed
A. Norrington and Company v. Peter Wright and Sons	188 (1885)	Gray	none	none	C.C.E.D. Pa.	affirmed
Filley v. Thomas J. Pope and Brother	213 (1885)	Gray	none	none	C.C.E.D. Mo.	reversed
Boston Mining Company v. Eagle Mining Company	221 (1885)	Waite	none	none	C.C.D. Cal.	affirmed
Lancaster v. Collins	222 (1885)	Blatchford	none	none	C.C.E.D. Mo.	affirmed
Van Weel v. Winston	228 (1885)	Miller	none	none	C.C.N.D. Ill.	affirmed
Starin v. City of New York	248 (1885)	Waite	none	none	C.C.S.D.N.Y.	affirmed
Clay v. Field	260 (1885)	Gray	None	None	N.D. Miss.	affirmed
Henderson v. Wadsworth	264 (1885)	Woods	None	None	C.C.D. Ky.	reversed
Moses v. Wooster	285 (1885)	Waite	None	None	C.C.S.D.N.Y.	abatement granted
Jacks v. City of Helena	288 (1885)	Waite	None	None	Ark.	dismissed
City of Waterville v. Van Slyke	290 (1885)	Waite	None	None	C.C.D. Kan.	continued
Hazlett v. United States	291 (1885)	Harlan	None	None	Ct. Cl.	affirmed
Merrick's Executor v. Giddings	300 (1885)	Harlan	None	None	Sup. Ct. D.C.	affirmed
Smith v. Black	308 (1885)	Blatchford	None	Field	Sup. Ct. D.C.	reversed
Cincinnati, New Orleans and Texas Pacific Railway Company v. Kentucky	321 (1885)	Matthews	None	None	Ky.	affirmed
Knickerbocker Life Insurance Company v. Pendleton	339 (1885)	Bradley	None	None	C.C.W.D. Tenn.	reversed
Sargent v. Helton	348 (1885)	Woods	None	None	C.C.S.D. Ala.	affirmed
Watts v. J.B. Camors and Company	353 (1885)	Gray	None	None	C.C.E.D. La.	affirmed
Thomas J. Pope and Brother v. E.P. Allis and Company	363 (1885)	Woods	None	None	C.C.E.D. Wis.	affirmed
Humphrey Bell and Company v. First National Bank of Chicago	373 (1885)	Blatchford	None	None	C.C.N.D. Ill.	reversed
Merchants' Exchange National Bank v. Bergen County	384 (1885)	Field	None	None	C.C.S.D.N.Y.	affirmed
Deffeback v. Hawke	392 (1885)	Field	None	None	Sup. Ct. Terr. Dakota	affirmed
Sparks v. Pierce	408 (1885)	Field	None	None	Sup. Ct. Terr. Dakota	affirmed
Alabama v. Burr	413 (1885)	Waite	None	None	original	dismissed
Eachus v. Broomall	429 (1885)	Matthews	None	None	C.C.E.D. Pa.	affirmed
Gibson v. Lyon	439 (1885)	Matthews	None	None	C.C.E.D. Pa.	affirmed
Gage v. Pumpelly	454 (1885)	Harlan	None	None	C.C.N.D. Ill.	affirmed
Jones v. Van Benthuysen	464 (1885)	Waite	None	None	C.C.E.D. La.	affirmed
Leonard v. Ozark Land Company	465 (1885)	Waite	None	None	C.C.E.D. Ark.	vacation denied
St. Louis, Iron Mountain and Southern Railway Company v. McGee	469 (1885)	Waite	None	None	Mo.	affirmed
Drew v. Grinnell	477 (1885)	Blatchford	None	None	C.C.S.D.N.Y.	affirmed
Bohlen v. Arthurs	482 (1885)	Blatchford	None	None	C.C.W.D. Pa.	affirmed
Kurtz v. Moffitt	487 (1885)	Gray	None	None	Cal. Super. Ct.	reversed
Shepherd v. May	505 (1885)	Woods	None	None	Sup. Ct. D.C.	affirmed
Missouri Pacific Railroad Company v. Humes	512 (1885)	Field	None	None	Mo.	affirmed
Missouri Pacific Railroad Company v. Terry	523 (1885)	per curiam	None	None	not indicated	affirmed
Davis Sewing Machine Company v. Richards	524 (1885)	Gray	None	None	Sup. Ct. D.C.	affirmed
Traer v. Clews	528 (1885)	Woods	None	None	Iowa	affirmed
Ferry v. Livingston	542 (1885)	Blatchford	None	None	C.C.E.D. Mich.	affirmed
Thompson v. Allen County	550 (1885)	Miller	None	Harlan	C.C.D. Ky.	affirmed
Effinger v. Kenney	566 (1885)	Field	None	None	Va.	reversed
Harrison, Havemeyer and Company v. Merritt, Collector of the Port of New York	577 (1885)	Blatchford	None	None	C.C.S.D.N.Y.	affirmed
Kenney v. Effinger	577 (1885)	Field	None	None	Va.	dismissed
Arnson v. Murphy	579 (1885)	Blatchford	None	None	C.C.S.D.N.Y.	affirmed
Pullman's Palace Car Company v. Missouri Pacific Railroad Company	587 (1885)	Waite	None	None	C.C.E.D. Mo.	affirmed
Hassall v. Wilcox	598 (1885)	Waite	None	None	C.C.W.D. Tex.	largely dismissed
Northern Pacific Railway Company v. Traill County	600 (1885)	Miller	None	None	Sup. Ct. Terr. Dakota	reversed
Bowman v. Chicago and Northwestern Railway Company	611 (1885)	Waite	None	None	C.C.N.D. Ill.	dismissed
Clay County v. United States	616 (1885)	Waite	None	None	C.C.D. Iowa	reversed
Campbell v. Holt	620 (1885)	Miller	None	Bradley	Tex.	affirmed
Baltzer v. Raleigh and Augusta Air Line Railroad Company	634 (1885)	Woods	None	None	C.C.W.D.N.C.	affirmed
New Orleans Gas Light Company v. Louisiana Light and Heat Producing and Manufacturing Company	650 (1885)	Harlan	None	None	C.C.E.D. La.	reversed
New Orleans Water Works Company v. Rivers	674 (1885)	Harlan	None	None	C.C.E.D. La.	reversed
Louisville Gas and Electric Company v. Citizens' Gaslight Company	683 (1885)	Harlan	None	None	Ky.	reversed
