= Justice Thomas =

Justice Thomas may refer to:

- Benjamin Thomas (politician) (1813–1878), associate justice of the Massachusetts Supreme Judicial Court
- Charles M. Thomas (judge) (c. 1844/1846–1895), associate justice of the South Dakota Territorial Supreme Court
- Clarence Thomas (born 1948), associate justice of the Supreme Court of the United States
- Darwin W. Thomas (1894–1954), associate justice of the Supreme Court of Idaho
- Edward A. Thomas (1838–1890), associate justice of the Territorial Wyoming Supreme Court
- Elwood L. Thomas (1930–1995), associate justice of the Supreme Court of Missouri
- Elwyn Thomas (1894–1971), associate justice of the Supreme Court of Florida
- James Burrows Thomas (born 1935), judge on the Supreme Court of Queensland
- Jesse B. Thomas Jr. (1806–1850), associate justice of the Supreme Court of Illinois
- John Charles Thomas (judge) (born c. 1950), associate justice of the Supreme Court of Virginia
- John Lilburn Thomas (1833–1924), associate justice of the Supreme Court of Missouri
- John Thomas, Baron Thomas of Cwmgiedd (born 1947), Lord Justice of Appeal of the Court of Appeal of England and Wales
- K. T. Thomas (judge) (born 1937), judge of the Supreme Court of India
- Richard V. Thomas (1932–2010), associate justice of the Supreme Court of Wyoming
- Robert R. Thomas (born 1952), associate justice of the Supreme Court of Illinois
- William H. Thomas (Alabama judge) (1867–1945), associate justice of the Alabama Supreme Court
- William H. Thomas (Maryland judge) (c. 1861–1924), judge of the Maryland Court of Appeals

== See also ==
- Judge Thomas (disambiguation)
