= Dakota Territorial Supreme Court =

The Dakota Territorial Supreme Court was the highest court of the Dakota Territory, then an organized incorporated territory of the United States. It was the first Territorial Supreme Court in American history, and was established under Article One of the United States Constitution, with justices were appointed directly by the President of the United States. The court sat in Yankton, South Dakota, and existed from March 2, 1861, to November 2, 1889. The first court consisted of three justices: Philemon Bliss, Lorenzo P. Williston, and Joseph Lanier Williams, appointed by President Abraham Lincoln. The court heard no cases until December 3, 1867. In 1879 the court enlarged to four justices, then six in 1884, and eight in 1888.

== Justices ==
Following is a list of justices of the Dakota Territorial Supreme Court, this was that existed. When the final extent of the reduced territory was split and admitted to the Union as the states of North and South Dakota, the court was abolished by operation of law, and its function was taken over by the North Dakota Supreme Court and the South Dakota Supreme Court.

Title	Name	Term begin	Term end	Appointed by
Chief Justice	Philemon Bliss	1861	1864	Abraham Lincoln
Associate Justice	Allan A. Burton	1861	1861	Abraham Lincoln
Associate Justice	Lorenzo P. Williston	1861	1865	Abraham Lincoln
Associate Justice	Joseph Lanier Williams	1861	1865	Abraham Lincoln
Chief Justice	Ara Bartlett	1864	1869	Abraham Lincoln
Associate Justice	William E. Gleason	1865	1867	Abraham Lincoln
Associate Justice	Jefferson P. Kidder	1865; 1879	1875; 1883	Abraham Lincoln; Rutherford B. Hayes
Associate Justice	John W. Boyle	1867	1869	Andrew Johnson
Associate Justice	Wilmot Brookings	1869	1873	Ulysses S. Grant
Chief Justice	George W. French	1869	1873	Ulysses S. Grant
Associate Justice	Alanson H. Barnes	1873	1881	Ulysses S. Grant
Chief Justice	Peter C. Shannon	1873	1882	Ulysses S. Grant
Associate Justice	Granville G. Bennett	1875	1878	Ulysses S. Grant
Associate Justice	Gideon C. Moody	1878	1883	Rutherford B. Hayes
Associate Justice	Sanford A. Hudson	March 1881	May 1885	James A. Garfield
Chief Justice	Alonzo J. Edgerton	January 1882	November 1886	Chester A. Arthur
Associate Justice	William E. Church	April 1883	July 1886	Chester A. Arthur
Associate Justice	Cornelius S. Palmer	February 1884	February 1888	Chester A. Arthur
Associate Justice	William H. Francis	July 1884	July 1888	Chester A. Arthur
Associate Justice	Seward Smith	July 1884	November 1885	Chester A. Arthur
Associate Justice	William B. McConnell	July 1885	November 1889	Grover Cleveland
Associate Justice	Louis K. Church	November 1885	January 1887	Grover Cleveland
Chief Justice	Bartlett Tripp	November 1886	November 1889	Grover Cleveland
Associate Justice	Charles M. Thomas	July 1886	November 1889	Grover Cleveland
Associate Justice	James Spencer	January 1887	November 1889	Grover Cleveland
Associate Justice	John Emmett Carland	February 1888	November 1889	Grover Cleveland
Associate Justice	Roderick Rose	July 1888	November 1889	Grover Cleveland
Associate Justice	Charles F. Templeton	October 1888	November 1889	Grover Cleveland
Associate Justice	Louis W. Crofoot	October 1888	November 1889	Grover Cleveland
Associate Justice	Frank R. Aikens	March 1889	November 1889	Benjamin Harrison
