= Justice Spencer =

Justice Spencer may refer to:

- Harry A. Spencer (1903–2007), associate justice of the Nebraska Supreme Court
- James Spencer (South Dakota judge) (c. 1844–1901), associate justice of the South Dakota Supreme Court
- John W. Spencer (1864–1939), associate justice of the Supreme Court of Indiana
- Martin Spencer (born 1956), judge of the British High Court
- William B. Spencer (1835–1882), associate justice of the Louisiana Supreme Court

== See also ==
- Judge Spencer (disambiguation)
