= The Last Frontier (1926 film) =

1926 film

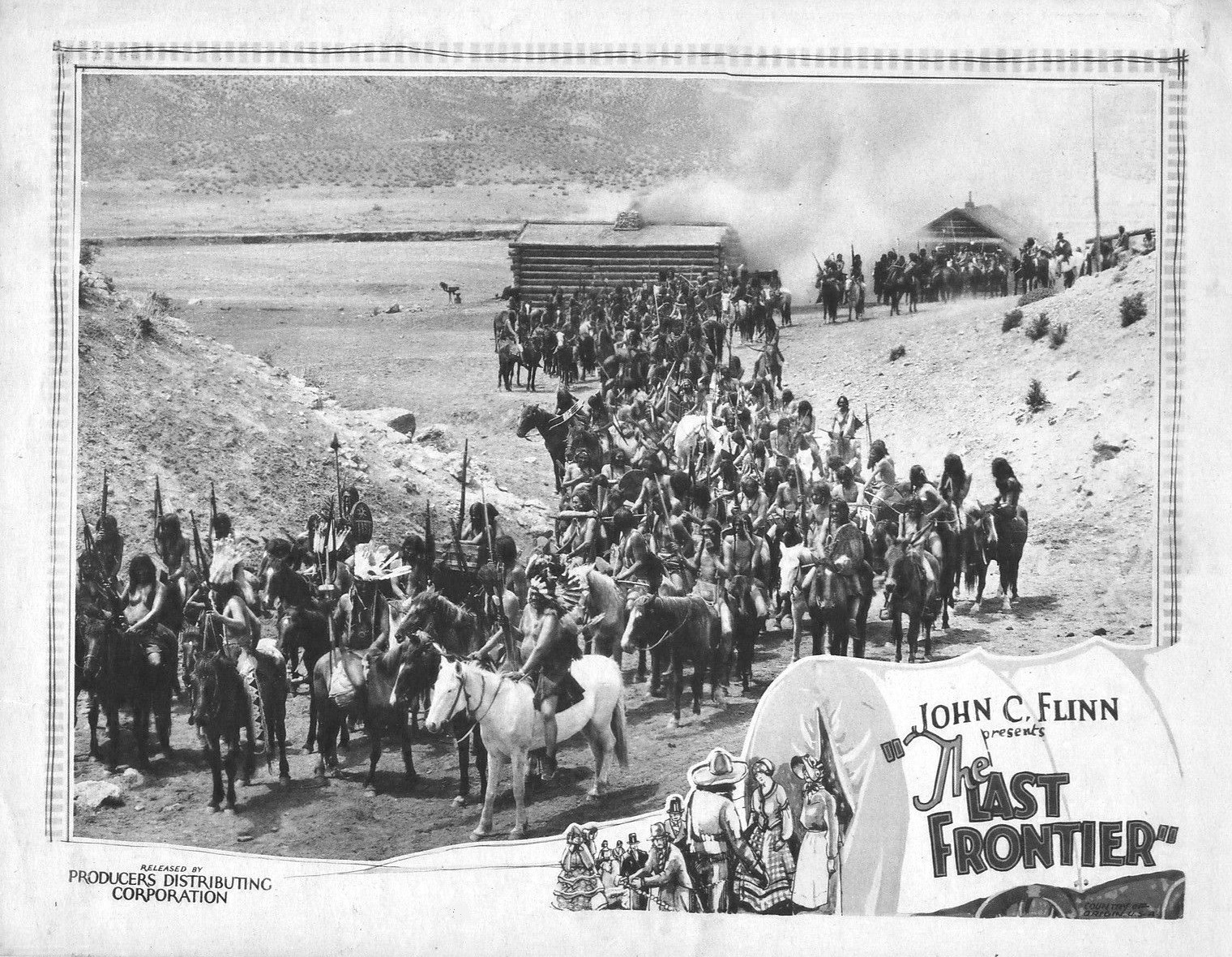
- Lobby card
- Directed by: George B. Seitz
- Written by: Will M. Ritchey
- Based on: The Last Frontier by Courtney Ryley Cooper
- Starring: William Boyd
- Cinematography: Charles Edgar Schoenbaum
- Production company: Metropolitan Pictures Corporation of California
- Distributed by: Producers Distributing Corporation
- Release date: August 16, 1926
- Running time: 8 reels
- Country: United States
- Languages: Silent; English intertitles

The Last Frontier is a 1926 American silent Western film directed by George B. Seitz and starring William Boyd, Marguerite De La Motte, and Jack Hoxie. The plot of this film was later reused in the 1948 Columbia Pictures serial Tex Granger.

== Plot ==
According to the copyright description, "Impoverished by the Civil War, and eager to replenish his fortune in the West, Colonel Halliday, his wife and his daughter Beth, are proceeding toward Salina, Kansas, by wagon train. Tom Kirby, a government scout and fiance of Beth, has persuaded Colonel Halliday to make the perilous journey and Beth is resolved never to forgive him should her parents come to harm.

Wild Bill Hickok, Tom's friend, and a company of U.S. Cavalry, are in charge of the wagon train. Pawnee Killer, chief of a band of Sioux Indians, attacks the wagon train and Colonel Halliday and his wife are killed. Wild Bill rides to Salina for help and brings news of the attack on the wagon train to Buffalo Bill Cody. Beth now hostile towards Kirby, becomes a member of the household of Lige Morris, a trader, at Salina, but he fails to tell her that Kirby has turned over to him for Beth's use, a large sum of money with which he had hoped to start a home for Beth and himself. Cynthia Jaggers, Lige's housekeeper, knows of this but bides her time.

At the suggestion of Wild Bill, Kirby recklessly joins General Custer's scouting expedition. There are many meetings of the Indians, whom General Custer seeks to pacify. Lige tells Beth that Kirby is suspected of being in league with Pawnee Killer and his Indian slayers and that he was responsible for the death of her parents. Caprice Jordan, a daughter of a post adjutant who loves Wild Bill, tells Beth that Kirby is madly in love with her (Beth), but she refuses to listen. Buffalo Bill discovers signs of an impending Indian outbreak, but General Custer orders him to take no repressive steps in the matter.

The Sioux massacre many persons along the railroad and Pawnee Killer plans to stampede a herd of buffalo through Salina. In a saloon, when Lige makes a slurring remark concerning Beth, he is soundly thrashed by Kirby. Cynthia Jaggers tells Beth the truth about Kirby and also of Lige's dishonesty. Beth seeks Kirby as the buffalo stampede towards the town. They meet and find refuge in a ditch. Custer gives battle to the Indians and, routed, Pawnee Killer slays Lige. The soldiers rout the Indians and Beth and Kirby come to a complete understanding, which is followed by a mutual avowal of love."

== Cast ==
- William Boyd as Tom Kirby
- Marguerite De La Motte as Beth
- Jack Hoxie as Buffalo Bill Cody
- J. Farrell MacDonald as Wild Bill Hickok
- Frank Coghlan Jr. as Buddy (credited as Junior Coghlan)
- Mitchell Lewis as Lige
- Gladys Brockwell as Cynthia Jaggers
- Frank Lackteen as Pawnee Killer
- Nipo T. Strongheart as Indian Chief (uncredited)

== Production ==
The Last Frontier was partially shot on location near Tuba City, Arizona, where 1,500 members of the local Hopi and Navajo tribes were enlisted to act as extras. A old frontier replica of Salina, Kansas was created by 150 crew members for the film.

== Preservation ==
A print of The Last Frontier is preserved in Archives Du Film Du CNC, Bois d'Arcy.
