= Lorenzo P. Williston =

American judge

Lorenzo Parsons Williston (in some sources, George P. Williston; 1815–1887) was an American attorney, judge, and politician. He was a member of the Pennsylvania House of Representatives, and a founding judge on the territorial supreme courts for both Dakota Territory and Montana Territory.

== Early life ==
Williston was born at Binghamton, New York. He received a liberal education and studied law under his father, Judge Horace Williston, in Athens, Pennsylvania. He was subsequently admitted to the bar of Bradford County, and moved to Wellsboro in Tioga County to enter a partnership with Judge Stephen Fowler Wilson.

== Political Life ==
Williston was elected to the Pennsylvania House of Representatives from Tioga County and served from 1856 until 1860. In 1861, he was appointed by President Abraham Lincoln to the Dakota Territorial Supreme Court, and served concurrently on the territorial district court. Lincoln then transferred him to serve as one of the first Associate Justices on the Montana Territorial Supreme Court in 1864. He was initially nominated for a second term in 1868 by President Andrew Johnson, but his nomination was withdrawn by Johnson two days later. Williston instead returned to Bradford County to resume the practice of law, first in Towanda, Pennsylvania, and later in Wellsboro. He died of apoplexy in 1887, at his home in Wellsboro.

The published record of the 1904 Tioga County Centennial Celebration included a brief biography of Williston in its section on the Tioga County bar, in which he was described as "a lawyer by intuition. Legal technicalities were not to his taste. He took a broad, liberal view of the law and seized at once the equities of a case and the legal principles involved. He had a strict regard for the ethics of his profession."

== Family ==
Williston married Martha A. Murphey, the daughter of one of the first physicians in Wellsboro. They had two sons and two daughters.

== Notes ==
Political offices
Preceded by Newly established court	Justice of the Dakota Territorial Supreme Court; 1861–1864	Succeeded by Jefferson P. Kidder
