= Kidder fight =

1867 skirmish near Goodland, Kansas, US

Kidder Fight
- Part of Hancock's War, American Indian Wars
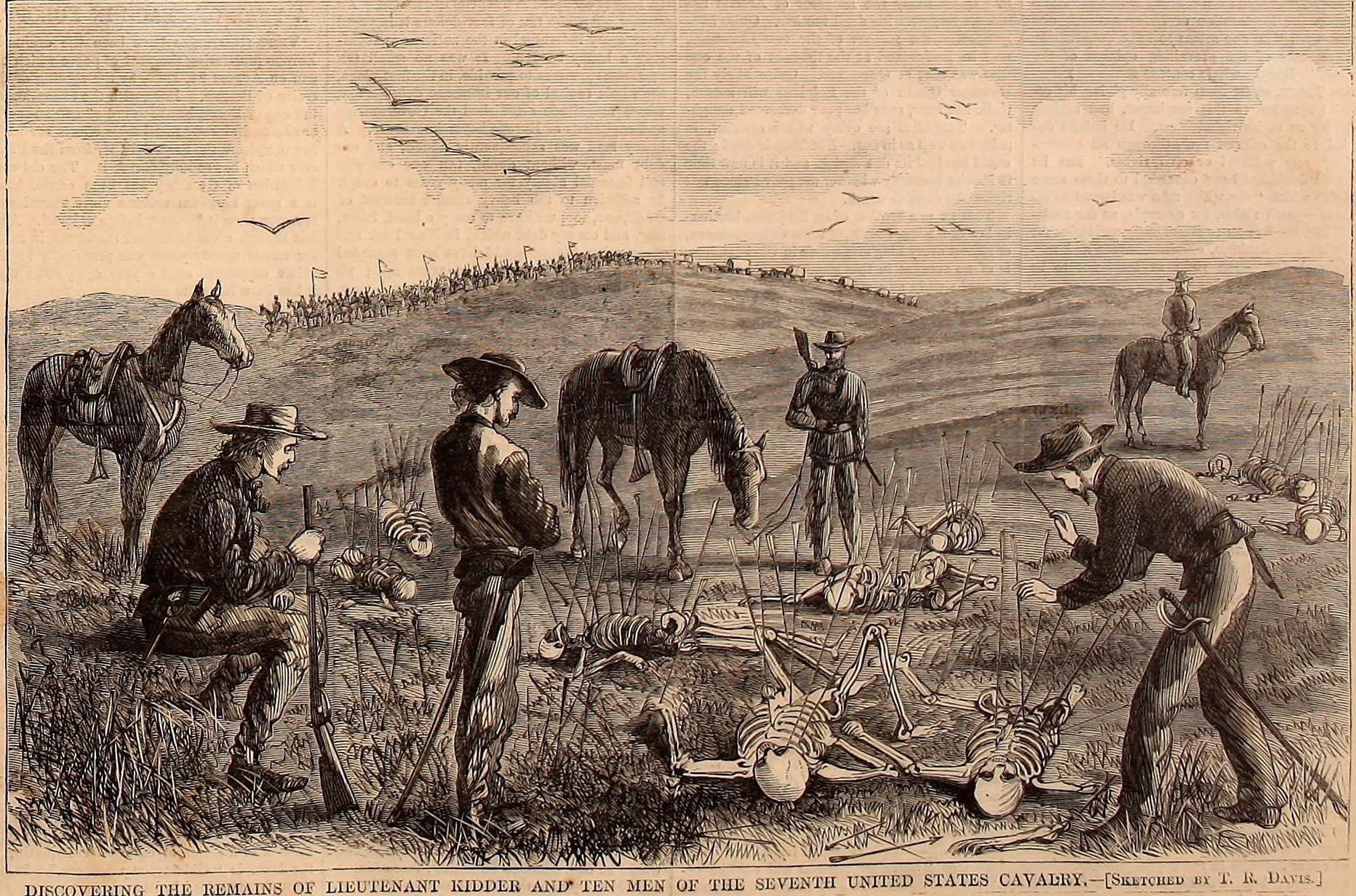
- Discovering the remains of Lieutenant Kidder and ten of his men, Harper's Weekly 1867
Date	29 June 1867
Location	present-day Sherman County, Kansas, US, near Goodland
Result	Cheyenne-Lakota victory

Belligerents
United States	Cheyenne; Sioux

Commanders and leaders
(United States) Lyman S. Kidder †	Tobacco, Pawnee Killer

Strength
12 cavalry	>14 warriors

Casualties and losses
12 killed	2 killed

The Kidder Fight (or Kidder Massacre), of July 2, 1867 refers to a skirmish near what is now Goodland, Kansas, United States. It involved a detachment of ten enlisted men and an Indian scout of the United States 2nd Cavalry under the command of Second Lieutenant Lyman S. Kidder who were attacked and wiped out by a mixed Lakota and Cheyenne force. Two Lakota, including chief Yellow Horse were also killed. The fight occurred during the period of the Indian Wars on the western plains and was an incident in the campaign known as Hancock's War.

== Lyman Kidder ==
Born in Vermont, Lt. Lyman Kidder was a son of politician and judge Jefferson P. Kidder. His family moved to the Dakota Territory, and he served in the American Civil War as a part of Hatch's Minnesota Cavalry Battalion from 1863 to 1866 as a First sergeant. In January 1867, he was appointed as a second lieutenant in the regular army. He was an uncle of Jeff Kidder, an Old West lawman.

== Kidder's mission ==
In June 1867 Kidder and his men were ordered to take dispatches from General William T. Sherman to Lieutenant Colonel George A. Custer, camped on the Republican River in Nebraska. Lt. Kidder's party reached the encampment, but prior to their arrival, Custer had become restless and moved his force to the south, then to the northwest. When Lt. Kidder discovered Custer's force had departed, he seemed to have thought Custer moved south to Fort Wallace.

== Chance encounter and fight ==
En route to Fort Wallace, Kidder and his troops were spotted by Oglala Lakota buffalo hunters who alerted the inhabitants of two small camps on nearby Little Beaver Creek in Colorado, that soldiers with pack mules were headed their way and would arrive in a short time. The camp inhabitants were Oglala Lakota and Cheyenne people who were in the area hunting buffalo. In the Oglala camp Pawnee Killer and Bear Raising Mischief were headmen. The leading men in the nearby Cheyenne camp were Tangle Hair, Tobacco and Howling Wolf. With them camped were nine young Dog Soldiers, among them Two Crows and Good Bear who later gave the only extant eyewitness report of the fight to George Bent who in turn furnished it in writing to George E. Hyde. On June 29, some Lakota men and all Cheyenne men stayed in camp because it was an unusually warm day, relaxing in the shades of their lodges while the women were sewing and chatting. The Cheyenne men had their ponies picketed close by their lodges and, when alerted, were the first to ride to meet the soldiers.

When Kidder's men spotted the twelve approaching Dog Soldiers, they raced off at a gallop in search of a defensible position and soon dismounted and sought shelter in a depression. The Dog Soldiers circled the soldiers, shooting at them while the Oglala men, arriving shortly after and fighting in Lakota fashion, dismounted and approached the soldiers on foot. According to Cheyenne accounts, the Lakota scout Red Bead, who was with the soldiers, called out to his fellow tribesmen to be spared, but his pleas went unheeded by the enraged warriors who considered him a traitor. Two of the circling Cheyenne warriors, Tobacco and Good Bear, exposing themselves to the fire of the soldiers, had their ponies shot from under them whereas two Oglala warriors were killed in the fight. One of them was Yellow Horse, who had been made a chief just shortly before. According to the eyewitnesses the fight lasted only a short time. All members of the Kidder party were killed, and the Lakotas scalped and ritually mutilated them to render them unable to fight in the afterworld by smashing in their skulls, slashing the sinews of their arms and legs, cutting off their noses as well and then filling every dead body with arrows. Red Bead was scalped as well but his scalp thrown into the dust next to him in a gesture of contempt for scouting against his fellow tribesmen.

The two Lakota men killed were two of only four Indians killed in the entire Hancock campaign by U.S. troops, the other two being One Bear and Eagle's Nest, two members of Black Kettle's "friendly" Southern Cheyenne camp, killed at Cimmarron Crossing near Fort Larned when trying to get out of the war zone.

== Aftermath ==
When Custer sent troopers to search for Lt. Kidder's party, they found a dead army horse on the trail, then signs of a running battle for a few miles along Beaver Creek. On 12 July, Custer's scout Will Comstock found the mutilated bodies of the Kidder party north of Beaver Creek in northern Sherman County, Kansas. The Army concluded the men were killed by a war party of Cheyenne and Sioux warriors led by Pawnee Killer.

Kidder's body, identified by his shirt, was taken by his father, a judge in the Dakota territory, for burial in the family plot in St. Paul, Minnesota. The bodies of the other soldiers were taken to Fort Wallace and buried. When Fort Wallace was closed in the 1880s, the soldiers' remains were moved to Fort Leavenworth, where they were reinterred.

Numerous artists depicted Custer's arriving at the scene of the fight. In his book, My Life on the Plains, Custer described it in these words: "Each body was pierced by from 20 to 50 arrows, and the arrows were found as the savage demons had left them, bristling in the bodies."

In 1967 "The Friends of the Library of Goodland Kansas" erected a historic marker in honor of the soldiers and scout, on land owned by Kuhrt Farms.

== See also ==
- List of battles won by Indigenous peoples of the Americas
- List of battles fought in Kansas
