= Kidder family =

American family of politicians

The Kidder family is a family of politicians from the United States.

- Isaiah Kidder 1770–1811, New Hampshire State Representative 1810–1811.
- Luther Kidder 1808–1854, Pennsylvania State Senator. First cousin of Isaiah Kidder.
- Ezra Kidder 1781–1841, New Hampshire State Representative. Second cousin of Isaiah Kidder.
- Lyman Kidder 1774–1841, Vermont State Representative. Third cousin of Isaiah Kidder.
- David Kidder 1787–1860, U.S. Representative from Maine 1823–1827, Maine State Representative 1829. Third cousin of Isaiah Kidder.
  - Arba Kidder 1808–1878, New Hampshire State Representative 1849–1850. Second cousin once removed of Isaiah Kidder.
  - Joseph Souther Kidder, Vermont State Representative 1870. Second cousin once removed of Isaiah Kidder.
  - Ira Kidder 1804–1858, Vermont State Representative 1849–1850. Son of Lyman Kidder.
  - Jefferson P. Kidder 1815–1883, delegate to the Vermont Constitutional Convention 1841, Vermont State Senator 1847–1848, Lieutenant Governor of Vermont 1853–1854, delegate to the Democratic National Convention 1856, Minnesota State Representative 1863–1864, Justice of the Dakota Territory Supreme Court 1865-1875 1979–1883, Delegate to Congress from Dakota Territory 1875–1879. Son of Lyman Kidder.
  - Alvan Kidder 1801–1871, Massachusetts State Representative 1835. Nephew of Lyman Kidder.
  - Francis Kidder 1803–1879, Vermont State Representative, Vermont State Senator. First cousin once removed of Lyman Kidder.
    - Silas W. Kidder, member of the Dakota Territorial Council 1870–1871. Grandson of Lyman Kidder.
      - Harley W. Kidder, candidate for U.S. Representative from Vermont 1928, candidate for Presidential Elector for Vermont 1928. First cousin thrice removed of Lyman Kidder.

NOTE: Alvan Kidder was also first cousin once removed of U.S. Senator Silas Wright, Jr.

== See also ==
- List of United States political families
