= Judge McConnell =

Judge McConnell may refer to:

- John J. McConnell Jr. (born 1958), judge of the United States District Court for the District of Rhode Island
- Michael W. McConnell (born 1955), judge of the United States Court of Appeals for the Tenth Circuit

== See also ==
- Justice McConnell (disambiguation)
