= John Emmett Carland =

American judge (1853–1922)

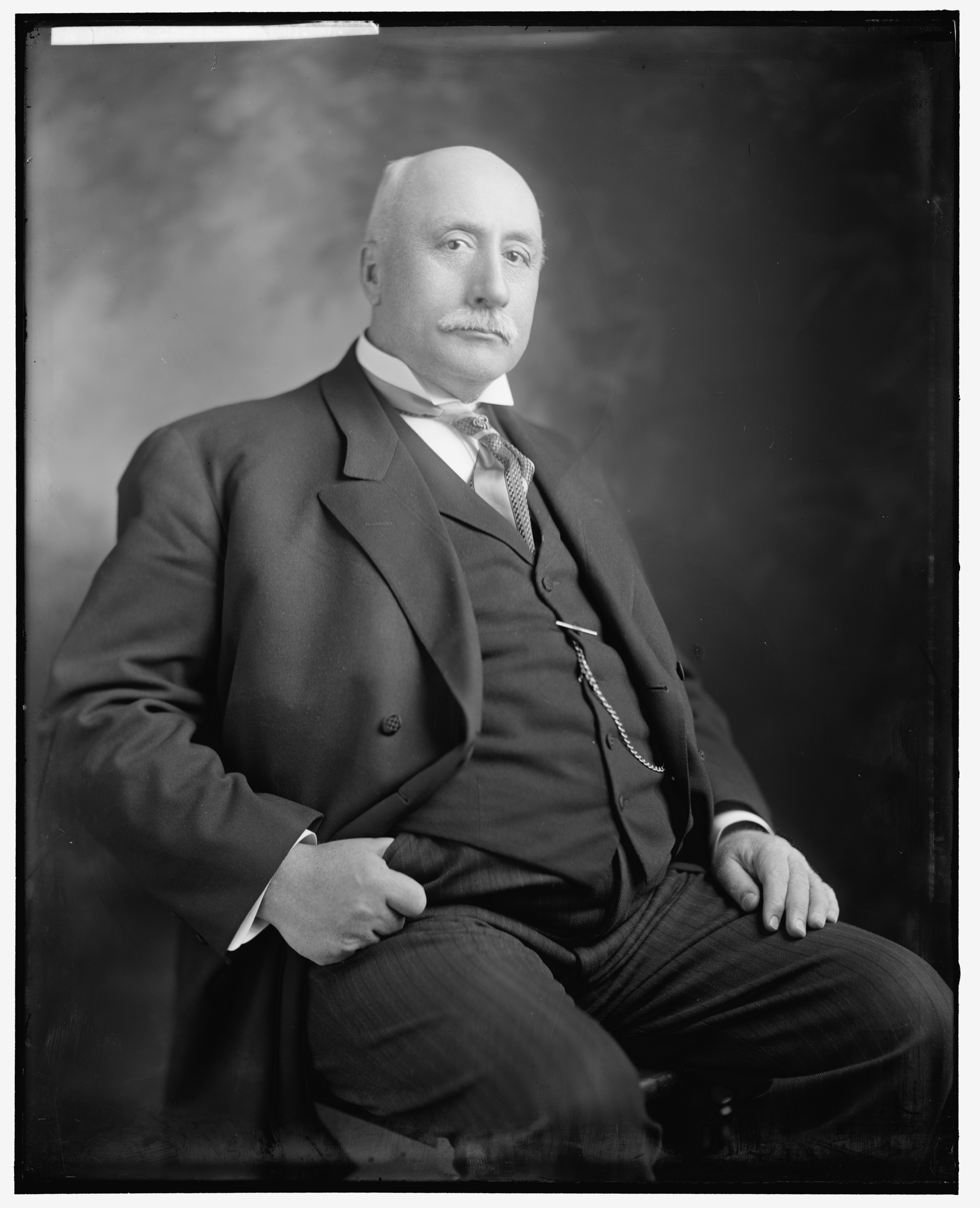

Judge of the United States Court of Appeals for the Eighth Circuit
- In office January 31, 1911 – November 11, 1922
- Appointed by: William Howard Taft
- Preceded by: Seat established by 36 Stat. 539
- Succeeded by: Seat abolished

Judge of the United States Circuit Courts for the Eighth Circuit
- In office January 31, 1911 – December 31, 1911
- Appointed by: William Howard Taft
- Preceded by: Seat established by 36 Stat. 539
- Succeeded by: Seat abolished

Judge of the United States Commerce Court
- In office January 31, 1911 – December 13, 1913
- Appointed by: William Howard Taft
- Preceded by: Seat established by 36 Stat. 539
- Succeeded by: Seat abolished

Judge of the United States District Court for the District of South Dakota
- In office August 31, 1896 – February 6, 1911
- Appointed by: Grover Cleveland
- Preceded by: Alonzo J. Edgerton
- Succeeded by: James Douglas Elliott

Personal details
- Born: John Emmett Carland; December 11, 1853 Oswego County, New York
- Died: November 11, 1922 (aged 68) Washington, D.C.
- Education: University of Michigan read law

John Emmett Carland (December 11, 1853 – November 11, 1922) was a United States circuit judge of the United States Commerce Court, the United States Court of Appeals for the Eighth Circuit and the United States Circuit Courts for the Eighth Circuit and previously was a United States district judge of the United States District Court for the District of South Dakota.

== Education and career ==
Born on December 11, 1853, in Oswego County, New York, Carland attended the University of Michigan and read law in 1877. He entered private practice in Bismarck, Dakota Territory (now North Dakota) starting in 1877, and served as city attorney for Bismarck. He also served as county attorney for Burleigh County, Dakota Territory (now North Dakota). He was the United States Attorney for the Dakota Territory from 1885 to 1888. Carland then served as a justice of the Dakota Territorial Supreme Court until 1889. He returned to private practice in Sioux Falls, Dakota Territory (State of South Dakota from November 2, 1889) from 1889 to 1895. He served as a special assistant to the United States Attorney for the District of South Dakota.

== Federal judicial service ==
Carland received a recess appointment from President Grover Cleveland on August 31, 1896, to a seat on the United States District Court for the District of South Dakota vacated by Judge Alonzo J. Edgerton. He was nominated to the same position by President Cleveland on December 8, 1896. He was confirmed by the United States Senate on December 15, 1896, and received his commission the same day. His service terminated on February 6, 1911, due to his elevation to the Commerce Court and Eighth Circuit.

Carland was nominated by President William Howard Taft on December 12, 1910, to the United States Commerce Court, the United States Court of Appeals for the Eighth Circuit and the United States Circuit Courts for the Eighth Circuit, to a new joint seat authorized by 36 Stat. 539. He was confirmed by the Senate on January 31, 1911, and received his commission the same day. On December 31, 1911, the Circuit Courts were abolished and he thereafter served on the Commerce Court and Court of Appeals. On December 13, 1913, the Commerce Court was abolished and he thereafter served only on the Court of Appeals. His service terminated on November 11, 1922, due to his death in Washington, D.C.

== Sources ==
Legal offices
Preceded by Alonzo J. Edgerton	Judge of the United States District Court for the District of South Dakota; 1896–1911	Succeeded by James Douglas Elliott
Preceded by Seat established by 36 Stat. 539	Judge of the United States Commerce Court; 1911–1913	Succeeded by Seat abolished
Preceded by Seat established by 36 Stat. 539	Judge of the United States Circuit Courts for the Eighth Circuit; 1911	Succeeded by Seat abolished
Preceded by Seat established by 36 Stat. 539	Judge of the United States Court of Appeals for the Eighth Circuit; 1911–1922	Succeeded by Seat abolished
