= George W. French =

American judge (1823–1887)

George Washington French (1823 – December 8, 1887) was a justice of the Dakota Territorial Supreme Court from 1869 to 1873.

== Life and career ==
Born in Thomaston, Maine, French began his career of public service as a county clerk in Maine. In 1869, Dr. Burleigh, a longtime friend of both French and President Andrew Johnson secured the appointment of French as chief justice of the Dakota Territorial Supreme Court, to succeed Ara Bartlett. His tenure yielded an unflattering anecdote in Doane Robinson's History of South Dakota:

French was, and probably ever will be, the joke of the Dakota bench. He was not a lawyer, but was a boyhood friend of Dr. Burleigh who waited to do something for him. So he went to his excellent friend, President Johnson, and requested him to nominate French for chief justice of Dakota territory. "Is he a good lawyer?" asked the President. "I don't know about his strength in law;" replied Burleigh, "equity is his strong suit." French got the appointment. He early earned the soubriquet of "Necessity," because he knew no law. He was absolutely ignorant of practice and procedure.

On March 15, 1873, President Ulysses S. Grant nominated French for a second term on the territorial supreme court, but withdrew the nomination within days and instead nominated Alanson H. Barnes to the seat.

Following his service in the Dakota Territory, French served as Secretary of the Territory of Wyoming from 1875 to 1879, and later returned to Thomaston, Maine to practice law. An 1880 report erroneously identified French as having been appointed chief justice of Arizona, the appointee actually having been C. G. W. French.

== Personal life and death ==
French died after a short illness at the residence of Oliver E. Copeland, in Orlando, Florida, at the age of 64. French had travelled there three weeks earlier to spend the winter, his wife and son having stayed in Cambridge, Massachusetts.

Political offices
Preceded by Ara Bartlett	Justice of the Dakota Territorial Supreme Court; 1869–1873	Succeeded by Alanson H. Barnes
Preceded by Jason B. Brown	Secretary of State of Wyoming Territory; 1875–1879	Succeeded by Albertis Worth Spates
