= Judge Spencer =

Judge Spencer may refer to:

- James R. Spencer (born 1949), judge of the United States District Court for the Eastern District of Virginia
- Vaino Spencer (1920–2016), first African-American woman appointed to a judgeship in California
- William Spencer (judge) (1782–1871), judge of probate for the District of Bradford, Vermont

== See also ==
- Justice Spencer (disambiguation)
