= James Douglas Elliott =

American judge

Judge of the United States District Court for the District of South Dakota
- In office June 7, 1911 – January 30, 1933
- Appointed by: William Howard Taft
- Preceded by: John Emmett Carland
- Succeeded by: Seat abolished

Personal details
- Born: James Douglas Elliott; October 7, 1859 Mount Sterling, Illinois
- Died: January 30, 1933 (aged 73)
- Education: read law

James Douglas Elliott (October 7, 1859 – January 30, 1933) was a United States district judge of the United States District Court for the District of South Dakota.

== Education and career ==
Born on October 7, 1859, in Mount Sterling, Illinois, Elliott read law in 1884. He entered private practice in Tyndall, Dakota Territory (State of South Dakota from November 2, 1889) from 1884 to 1910. He was state's attorney for Bon Homme County, Dakota Territory/South Dakota from 1887 to 1891. He was the United States Attorney for the District of South Dakota from 1897 to 1907. He was counsel for C.M. & St. P. Railroad in Aberdeen, South Dakota from 1910 to 1911.

== Federal judicial service ==
Elliott was nominated by President William Howard Taft on May 25, 1911, to a seat on the United States District Court for the District of South Dakota vacated by Judge John Emmett Carland. He was confirmed by the United States Senate on June 7, 1911, and received his commission the same day. His service terminated on January 30, 1933, due to his death.

== Sources ==
Legal offices
Preceded by John Emmett Carland	Judge of the United States District Court for the District of South Dakota; 1911–1933	Succeeded by Seat abolished
