= Judge Thomas =

Judge Thomas may refer to:

- Alfred Delavan Thomas (1837–1896), judge of the United States District Court for the District of North Dakota
- Clarence Thomas (born 1948), judge of the United States Court of Appeals for the District of Columbia Circuit prior to serving on the Supreme Court of the United States
- Daniel Holcombe Thomas (1906–2000), judge of the United States District Court for the Southern District of Alabama
- Edward B. Thomas (1848–1929), judge of the United States District Court for the Eastern District of New York
- Edwin Stark Thomas (1872–1952), judge of the United States District Court for the District of Connecticut
- Holly A. Thomas (born 1979), judge of the United States Court of Appeals for the Ninth Circuit
- Seth Thomas (judge) (1873–1962), judge of the United States Court of Appeals for the Eighth Circuit
- Sidney R. Thomas (born 1953), judge of the United States Court of Appeals for the Ninth Circuit
- Ted Thomas (judge) (born 1934), judge of the Court of Appeal of New Zealand
- William Kernahan Thomas (1911–2001), judge of the United States District Court for the Northern District of Ohio

== See also ==
- Justice Thomas (disambiguation)
