= Jefferson P. Kidder =

American lawyer and jurist (1815–1883)

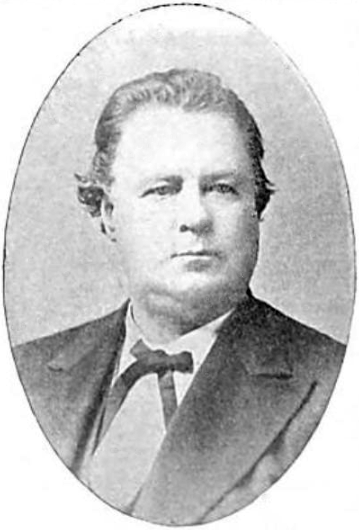

Member of the U.S. House of Representatives from Dakota Territory's at-large district
- In office March 4, 1875 – March 3, 1879 (Delegate)
- Preceded by: Moses K. Armstrong
- Succeeded by: Granville G. Bennett

19th Lieutenant Governor of Vermont
- In office October 1853 – October 13, 1854
- Governor: John S. Robinson
- Preceded by: William C. Kittredge
- Succeeded by: Ryland Fletcher

Member of the Minnesota House of Representatives
- In office January 6, 1861 – January 2, 1865

Member of the Vermont Senate
- In office 1847–1849

Personal details
- Born: June 4, 1815 Braintree, Vermont, U.S.
- Died: October 2, 1883 (aged 68) St. Paul, Minnesota, U.S.
- Party: Democratic (before 1857); Republican (from 1857)

Jefferson Parish Kidder (June 4, 1815 – October 2, 1883) was an American lawyer and jurist. He served as the non-voting delegate from the Dakota Territory to the United States House of Representatives. Kidder was the only Democratic lieutenant governor of Vermont until John J. Daley in 1965.

== Early life ==
Kidder was born in Braintree, Vermont on June 4, 1815. He attended the Orange County Grammar School in Randolph, and graduated from Alden Partridge's American Literary, Scientific and Military Academy (Norwich University) in 1834. He studied law in Montpelier, was admitted to the bar in 1839 and practiced in Braintree and West Randolph. Among the prospective attorneys who studied law under Kidder's supervision were John W. Rowell, who went on to serve as chief justice of the Vermont Supreme Court and Carl C. Pope, a legislator and judge in Wisconsin.

== Career ==
He was a member of the Vermont Constitutional Convention in 1843. He served as State's Attorney for Orange County (1842-1847), a member of the Vermont State Senate (1847-1849), the Lieutenant Governor of Vermont (1852-1853), and a delegate to the 1856 Democratic National Convention.

In 1848 he received the honorary degree of Master of Arts from the University of Vermont.

In 1857 Kidder moved to St. Paul, Minnesota, where he joined the Republican Party.

In 1859, Kidder moved to Dakota Territory and became a delegate to Congress from the provisional government at Sioux Falls.

In 1862 and 1863, he was elected to the Minnesota House of Representatives. In 1865 he moved to Vermillion, Dakota Territory, when Abraham Lincoln appointed him an associate justice of the territorial Supreme Court.

In 1874, he was elected as the territory's delegate to Congress. He served from March 4, 1875 to March 3, 1879 and was an unsuccessful candidate for renomination in 1878.

1879, Kidder was reappointed to the Supreme Court of Dakota Territory. He served until his death in 1883.

== Death and burial ==
Kidder died in St. Paul on October 2, 1883. He was buried in St. Paul's Oakland Cemetery.

== Family ==
His son Lyman S. Kidder was a U.S. Cavalry 2nd lieutenant serving in the 2nd Cavalry under George Armstrong Custer, and was killed in action in what would be dubbed the Kidder massacre.

Jefferson Kidder was also the grandfather of noted lawman and Arizona Ranger Jeff Kidder.

== Legacy ==
Kidder County, North Dakota is named for him.

Party political offices
Preceded by Giles Harrington	Democratic nominee for Lieutenant Governor of Vermont; 1852, 1853	Succeeded by William Mattocks
Political offices
Preceded by William C. Kittredge	Lieutenant Governor of Vermont; 1853–1854	Succeeded by Ryland Fletcher
Preceded by Lorenzo P. Williston	Justice of the Dakota Territorial Supreme Court; 1861–1864	Succeeded by Granville G. Bennett
U.S. House of Representatives
Preceded by Moses K. Armstrong	Delegate to the U.S. House of Representatives from Dakota Territory's at-large congressional district March 4, 1875 – March 3, 1879	Succeeded by Granville G. Bennett
