= Jeff Kidder =

Lawman of the American Old West

Jeff Kidder (November 15, 1875 – April 5, 1908) was an American lawman in the closing days of the American Old West. He was most noted for his service with the Arizona Rangers.

== Early life ==
Jefferson David Kidder was born in Vermillion, Dakota Territory. His father, Silas W. Kidder (1847–1920), who was from a prominent Vermont family, had settled in South Dakota during 1868. His grandfather, Jefferson P. Kidder, had served as the Lieutenant Governor of Vermont and later served on the South Dakota Supreme Court and in the U.S. House of Representatives. His uncle, Lyman S. Kidder (1842–1867), became an officer in the 2nd Cavalry Regiment (United States) and served under George Custer. He and his detachment were killed in July 1867, in an event that became known as the Kidder Massacre.

== Life in the west ==
Jeff Kidder attended the University of South Dakota where he studied algebra, language and composition. In 1901, Jeff Kidder's family moved to California. That same year, the Arizona Rangers were formed, and Kidder ventured southwest to join them. He took several jobs in between, including working as a cowboy, miner, and lawman in Nogales, Arizona until he was hired by the Rangers in 1903. Kidder quickly became known within the Rangers as a marksman, second only to Captain Harry C. Wheeler. Arizona Ranger Captain Tom Rynning would later claim that he never saw any man faster with a gun on a quick draw.

In June 1903, Kidder and other Rangers went to Morenci to quell the mine strikes and riots. Kidder later began working to control cattle rustling along the United States/Mexico border near Nogales, He often worked alone, but sometimes was joined by Rangers Fred Rankin, Billy Old, and Bill Sparks. Kidder, Rankin, Sparks and Old had all received commissions from Mexican General Luis Emeterio Torres (1844–1935), Governor of Sonora, authorizing them to enter into Mexico if need be in pursuit of outlaws.

In early 1904, Kidder and Rankin intercepted gunrunners near the border, which resulted in a gun battle. Kidder shot and killed one of the outlaws, with Rankin shooting the horse out from under another. The Rangers confiscated several weapons and 10,000 rounds of ammunition. Kidder had numerous other clashes with gunrunners on the border, leading to intelligence reports that he was to be targeted by outlaws in the gunrunning business. In the fall of 1907, Kidder and a Benson, Arizona Constable fought and captured one bandit and dispersed several others who were smuggling arms and gunpowder. By this time, Kidder had a sizable reputation on the border and was promoted to sergeant in early 1908.

== Gunfight and death ==
On April 3, 1908, Kidder pursued gunrunners into Naco, Sonora and located suspects in a cantina. A gunfight erupted with Delores Quias and Tomas Amador, both of whom were local policemen, resulting in Kidder being wounded together with both Mexican policemen. The shooting brought two other policemen who fired at Kidder, hitting him through the stomach. Kidder was badly wounded, the bullet having passed through his intestines and exiting his back. Kidder, alone and outnumbered, returned fire on the two officers.

He next attempted unsuccessfully to make it back across the border. Kidder walked into the night attempting to reach the border several hundred yards away. Several Mexican policemen and civilians stood between him and the border at this point and began firing. Kidder continued to return fire until his ammunition was expended, at which point he surrendered. Naco Police Chief Victoriano Amador, who had been wounded by Kidder, jumped on him together with several of his policemen. Reportedly the police beat Kidder as they dragged him about fifty yards toward the local jail where he was hit on the head with a pistol, resulting in a skull fracture. Kidder was held in jail that night without medical attention.

The following day, American officials led by Ranger Captain Wheeler persuaded local officials to release Kidder into a private residence for medical care. Dr. Francis Eppes Shine arrived from Bisbee, Arizona to attend him. However, by that point there was little hope that Kidder could survive although he was able to speak and to relay his own version of the events. Deputy US Marshal John Foster entered into Naco and visited Kidder during this time, along with several others having authority to do so. Kidder died on April 5, 1908. At first, local authorities refused to allow Kidder's body to be removed to American soil. To prevent an international incident, General Torres intervened and ordered Kidder's body returned to the Americans. His body was sent to his mother in Los Angeles, California, where he was buried.

== Related reading ==
- DeArment, Robert K. (2007) Deadly Dozen: Twelve Forgotten Gunfighters of the Old West (University of Oklahoma Press. pp. 194–210) ISBN 080613559X
- DeSoucy, M. David; Marshall Trimble (2008) Arizona Rangers, Images of America (Arcadia Publishing) ISBN 978-0738548319
- Miller, Joseph (1975) The Arizona Rangers (Hastings House Book Publishers) ISBN 0803803532
- O'Neal, Bill (1987) The Arizona Rangers (Eakin Press) ISBN 0890156107
- Thrapp, Dan L. (1991) Encyclopedia of Frontier Biography, Volume II (University of Nebraska Press) ISBN 978-0803294196
