= Charles M. Thomas (judge) =

American judge (c. 1844/1846–1895)

Charles M. Thomas (c. 1844/1846 – September 5, 1895) was a justice of the Dakota Territorial Supreme Court from 1886 to 1889.

Born in Kentucky, at the age of sixteen he enlisted in the Confederate States Army and served throughout the war. Afterwards, he took up the study of law and became prominent as a lawyer in Kentucky, making his home in Bowling Green. He served for several years as county judge of Warren County, Kentucky.

In 1886, with the support of Representative John Edward Halsell and Senator W. Jasper Blackburn, Thomas was nominated by President Grover Cleveland to serve as judge of the first judicial district under the territorial organization. Thomas presided over the courts held in the territory for three years. On the admission of the state into the union he was elected judge of the eighth judicial circuit and served for four years. He was a candidate for re-election but the election resulted in his retirement from the bench. Thomas died of Bright's disease at the age of 49 in Chicago, where he had gone about a month before for medical treatment. His remains were taken to Bowling Green for burial.

Political offices
Preceded by William E. Church	Justice of the Dakota Territorial Supreme Court; 1886–1889	Succeeded by Seat abolished due to statehood
