= William B. McConnell =

American judge (1849–1931)

William B. McConnell (November 15, 1849 – August 4, 1931) was a justice of the Dakota Territorial Supreme Court from 1886 to 1889.

Born in Greene County, Pennsylvania, McConnell received an undergraduate degree from Waynesburg College and then read law under Judge Morris, in Fort Wayne, Indiana.

He moved to the Dakota Territory, and in 1885 President Grover Cleveland nominated McConnell to a seat on the Supreme Court of the Dakota Territory vacated by the expiration of the commission of Sanford A. Hudson, with the United States Senate confirming the appointment on January 20, 1896. McConnell remained in that office until the Dakota Territory was admitted to the union as two new states of the United States, in 1889. McConnell was then elected as the first judge of the Third Judicial District of North Dakota, serving in that capacity from 1889 to 1896. By the early 1900s, McConnell moved to Fremont, Ohio, where he remained a "prominent citizen... for more than 30 years".

McConnell had a wife, Emma, with whom he had a daughter. McConnell died in Sandusky County, Ohio, at the age of 81.

Political offices
Preceded by Sanford A. Hudson	Justice of the Dakota Territorial Supreme Court; 1886–1889	Succeeded by Seat abolished due to statehood
