= Pawnee Killer =

Oglala, Native American, leader

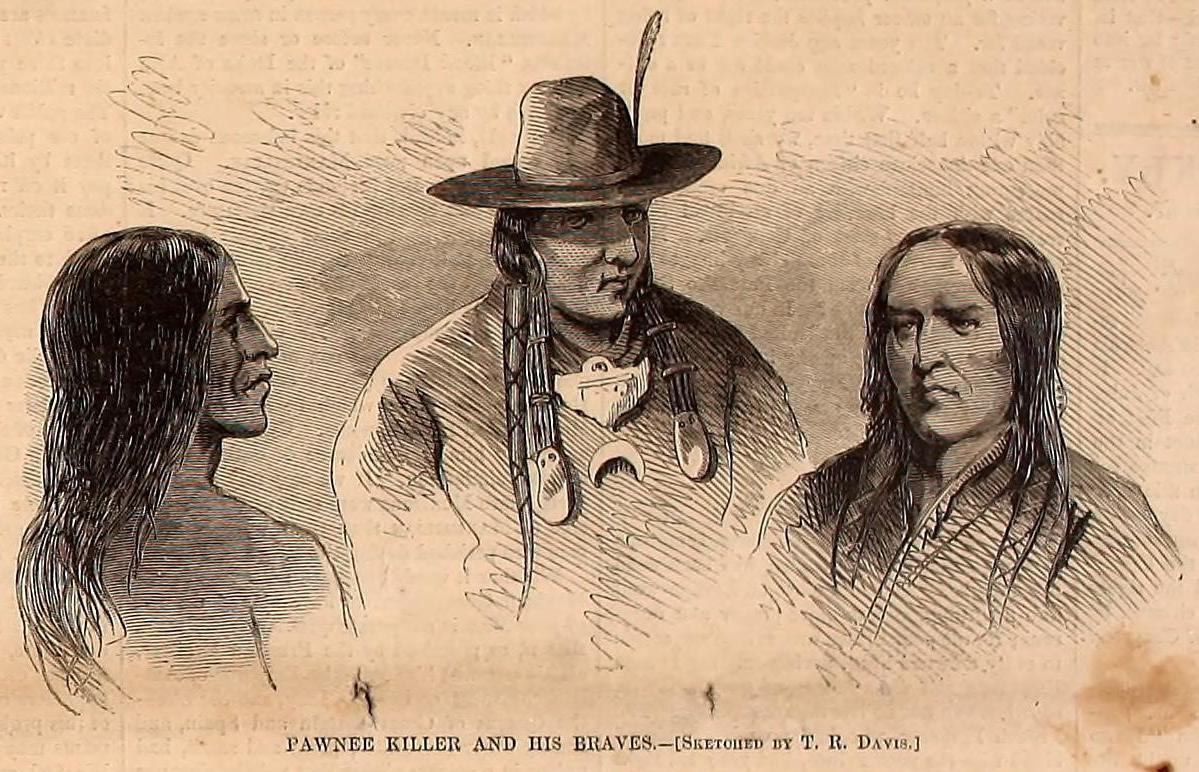
Pawnee Killer and his braves, Harper's Weekly 1867

Pawnee Killer (born c. 1826) was a leader of the Oglala. He also led a band of mixed Sioux-Cheyenne Dog Soldiers during the US war against the Plains Indians.

His name was derived from his exploits against the Pawnee, the traditional enemies of the Oglala and allies of the US government.

After the U.S. Army committed the Sand Creek Massacre in 1864, Pawnee Killer participated in the retaliatory attack on Julesburg in Colorado in early 1865 and the Fetterman Fight in Wyoming during Red Cloud's War. He also fought in the so-called Kidder fight in Kansas in 1867 and possibly the Battle of Beecher Island in 1868.

After the end of the American-Sioux wars, he settled with his family at the Pine Ridge Reservation of the Red Cloud Agency in Nebraska. Little is known of his later life although he is listed on the reservation's census records, as a head of household, until June 1895.
