= Alonzo J. Edgerton =

American judge

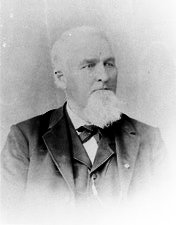

Judge of the United States District Court for the District of South Dakota
- In office November 19, 1889 – August 9, 1896
- Appointed by: Benjamin Harrison
- Preceded by: Seat established by 25 Stat. 676
- Succeeded by: John Emmett Carland

United States Senator from Minnesota
- In office March 12, 1881 – November 14, 1881
- Appointed by: John S. Pillsbury
- Preceded by: William Windom
- Succeeded by: William Windom

Member of the Minnesota Senate from the 13th district
- In office 1858-1859
- Preceded by: Boyd Phelps
- Succeeded by: Thomas McRoberts

Member of the Minnesota House of Representatives

Personal details
- Born: Alonzo Jay Edgerton; June 7, 1827 Rome, New York
- Died: August 9, 1896 (aged 69) Sioux Falls, South Dakota
- Resting place: Evergreen Cemetery; Mantorville, Minnesota
- Party: Republican
- Education: Wesleyan University read law

Military service
- Allegiance: United States; Union
- Branch/service: United States Army; Union Army
- Years of service: 1862–1867
- Rank: Colonel; Brevet Brigadier General
- Unit: 10th Minnesota Infantry Regiment; 67th United States Colored Infantry Regiment
- Battles/wars: American Civil War

Alonzo Jay Edgerton (June 7, 1827 – August 9, 1896) was a United States senator from Minnesota and a United States district judge of the United States District Court for the District of South Dakota.

== Education and career ==
Born June 7, 1827, in Rome, New York, Edgerton graduated from Wesleyan University in 1850 and read law in 1855. At Wesleyan, he became a member of the Mystical Seven. He was admitted to the bar and entered private practice in Mantorville, Minnesota, from 1855 to 1861. He was prosecutor for Dodge County, Minnesota. He was a member of the Minnesota Senate from 1858 to 1859. In 1862, during the American Civil War, Edgerton organized a company of militia which later constituted Company B of the Tenth Minnesota Infantry Volunteers. By January 1864, he had risen to the rank of Colonel of the 67th Regiment Infantry United States Colored Troops. He was brevetted a brigadier general on March 13, 1865, and confirmed on April 10, 1866. He resumed private practice in Mantorville from 1867 to 1871. He was Railroad Commissioner for Minnesota from 1871 to 1874. Edgerton became a regent of the University of Minnesota in 1872. He again resumed private practice in Mantorville from 1874 to 1877. He served as a member of the Minnesota House of Representatives and returned to private practice in Mantorville from 1878 to 1881.

== Congressional service ==
Edgerton was appointed as a Republican to the United States Senate to fill the vacancy caused by the resignation of United States Senator William Windom and served from March 12, 1881, to October 30, 1881, during the 47th United States Congress, when a successor was elected.

== Later career ==
Following his departure from Congress, Edgerton served as a Judge of the District Court for the District of Dakota Territory from 1881 to 1885. He returned to private practice in Mitchell, Dakota Territory (State of South Dakota from November 2, 1889) from 1885 to 1889. He served as President of the constitutional convention of South Dakota.

== Federal judicial service ==
Edgerton received a recess appointment from President Benjamin Harrison on November 19, 1889, to the United States District Court for the District of South Dakota, to a new seat authorized by 25 Stat. 676. He was nominated to the same position by President Harrison on December 16, 1889. He was confirmed by the United States Senate on January 16, 1890, and received his commission the same day. His service terminated on August 9, 1896, due to his death in Sioux Falls, South Dakota. He was interred in Evergreen Cemetery in Mantorville.

== Membership ==
Edgerton was a Freemason.

== Honor ==
The town of Edgerton, Minnesota, is named in Edgerton's honor.

== See also ==
- List of American Civil War generals (Union)
- List of American Civil War brevet Generals (Union)

== Sources ==
- United States Congress. "Alonzo J. Edgerton (id: E000046)". Biographical Directory of the United States Congress.

U.S. Senate
Preceded by William Windom	U.S. senator (Class 2) from Minnesota; 1881; Served alongside: Samuel J. R. McMillan	Succeeded by William Windom
Legal offices
Preceded by Seat established by 25 Stat. 676	Judge of the United States District Court for the District of South Dakota; 1889–1896	Succeeded by John Emmett Carland
