= James Spencer (South Dakota judge) =

American judge (c. 1844–1901)

James Spencer (c. 1844 – April 1901) was a justice of the Dakota Territorial Supreme Court from 1887 to 1889.

Spencer hailed from Whitehall, New York, where he served as president of the village of Whitehall, county supervisor, and in 1886 was a candidate for the nomination for assemblyman. In January 1887, President Grover Cleveland appointed Spencer to the Dakota territorial supreme court, replacing Justice Louis K. Church whom Cleveland had appointed governor of the territory. A report at the time of his appointment described Spencer as "a bright, popular country lawyer, 42 years old", who was "active in politics, and belongs to the young set of Cleveland reformers, of which Judge Church was the leader". Spencer had a brother named Fred who had previously received an appointment from President Cleveland to a customs position at Arthur's Landing, opposite Montreal.

Spencer remained on the territorial supreme court until the division of the territory and the admission of the two sections as states towards the end of 1889. His last official act as a judge "was the sentencing to the penitentiary at Sioux Falls for life of John Flaherty, for the murder of May Wilson". Following his service on the court, Spencer returned to New York, where he died at Saratoga Springs, New York at the age of 57 or 58, following "a long illness resembling paralysis".

Political offices
| Preceded by Louis K. Church | Justice of the Dakota Territorial Supreme Court; 1887–1889 | Succeeded by Court abolished due to statehood. |
