= Alanson H. Barnes =

American judge (1817–1890)

Alanson Hamilton Barnes
- Born: April 15, 1817; Turin, New York, United States
- Died: May 11, 1890 (aged 73)
- Occupation: Associate Justice of the Dakota Territory Supreme Court
- Known for: namesake of Barnes County, North Dakota

Alanson Hamilton Barnes (April 15, 1817 – May 11, 1890) was an associate justice of the Dakota Territory Supreme Court and the namesake of Barnes County, North Dakota.

== Career ==
Born in Turin, New York in 1817, Barnes served on the Court from 1873 until 1881.

He was appointed associate justice of the Dakota Territory Supreme Court by President Ulysses S. Grant, Abraham Lincoln's commander-in-chief, on March 24, 1873.

He replaced Judge George W. French. He was assigned to be judge of the Second District by Governor John A. Burbank, and of the Third District by Acting Governor Whitney.

He was reappointed Associate Justice by President Rutherford B. Hayes in March, 1877, and replaced by Sanford A. Hudson of Wisconsin in 1881.

== Death ==
He died in 1890 and is buried at Spring Grove Cemetery in Walworth County, Wisconsin. He was married to Clarissa Hills, daughter of Fanny Alsmena Yale, and was a cousin of Capt. Josiah Yale of Lee, Massachusetts.

== Family ==
Barnes' son-in-law was Alfred Delavan Thomas, who served as a judge of the United States District Court for the District of North Dakota, appointed by President Benjamin Harrison.

His son-in-law Thomas became the corporate attorney of millionaire George Hearst, father of William Randolph Hearst of Hearst Castle. Hearst's wealth came from the Homestake Mines he owned in South Dakota.

Political offices
| Preceded by George W. French | Justice of the Dakota Territory Supreme Court; 1873–May 4, 1881 | Succeeded by |
