= Judicial Panel on Multidistrict Litigation =

Body in the United States federal court system

United States Judicial Panel on Multidistrict Litigation
- (J.P.M.L.)
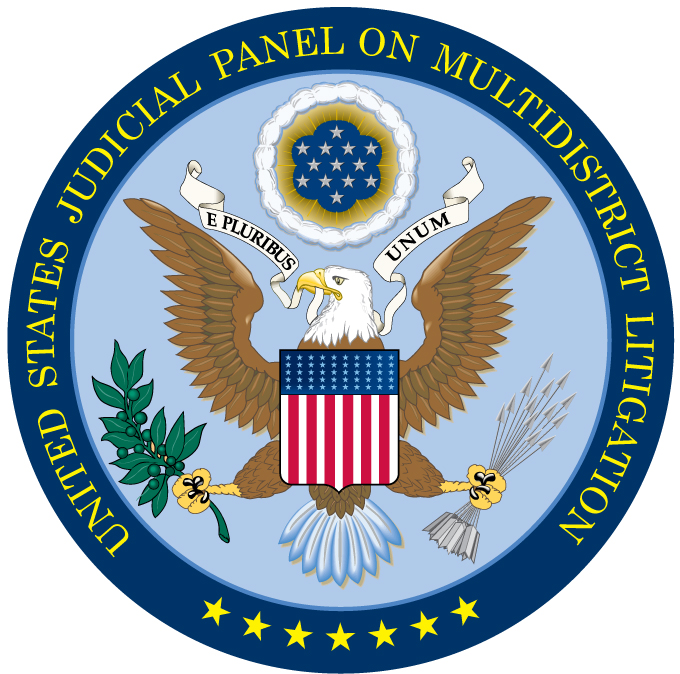
- Location: Thurgood Marshall Federal Judiciary Building (Washington, D.C.)
- Established: 1968
- Authority: Article III court
- Created by: 28 U.S.C. § 1407 & § 2112
- Composition method: Chief Justice appointment
- Judges: 7
- Chair: Karen K. Caldwell
- www.jpml.uscourts.gov

The United States Judicial Panel on Multidistrict Litigation (J.P.M.L. or the Panel) is a special body within the United States federal court system which manages multidistrict litigation. It was established by Congress in 1968 by Pub. L. 90–296, and has the authority to determine whether civil actions pending in two or more federal judicial districts should be transferred to a single federal district court for pretrial proceedings. If such cases are determined to involve one or more common questions of fact and are transferred, the panel will then select the district court and assign a judge or judges to preside over the litigation. The purpose of the transfer or "centralization" process is to conserve the resources of the parties and their counsel, as well as the judiciary, thus avoiding duplication of discovery and preventing inconsistent pretrial rulings.

The Chief Justice of the United States, currently John Roberts, appoints the members of the panel, which is composed of no more than seven United States federal judges serving on either district courts or courts of appeals. All panel members must be from different judicial circuits. In addition to their participation on the panel, the members continue to serve as judges for the courts to which they were originally appointed. The panel convenes hearings in various locations around the country to facilitate the participation of parties and their counsel. The Office of the Clerk of the Panel is located at the Thurgood Marshall Federal Judiciary Building in Washington, D.C.

As of September 30, 2018, the Panel has centralized 1,722 dockets involving more than 673,000 individual cases. There have been 1,131 additional docket requests that were not centralized. These dockets encompass litigation categories as diverse as securities fraud, drugs and other products liability cases, intellectual property infringement, antitrust law violations, airplane crashes, employment practices and consumer data security breaches.

The panel also has the additional responsibility of centralizing multicircuit petitions for review: petitions for review of a government agency order or decision which are currently pending in two or more federal courts of appeals. The panel has delegated this task to its clerk, who selects a court of appeals by lottery (i.e., spinning a drum and selecting a number at random). Before Congress created the random lottery procedure by statute in 1988, parties litigating in support of and against controversial government agency decisions would race to file in their preferred court of appeals in accordance with the traditional rule that the appropriate venue was usually where a petition for review was first filed.

== Members of the panel ==
Since the panel was established in 1968, it has been composed of the following 57 judges:

Name	Lifespan	Date appointed	End date	Chair term	Court	Circuit	Appointed by
Alfred P. Murrah	1904–1975	May 29, 1968	October 30, 1975	1968–1975	W.D. Okla. (1937–1940); 10th Cir. (1940–1975)	10th Cir.	Earl Warren
John Minor Wisdom	1905–1999	May 29, 1968	November 15, 1978	1975–1978	5th Cir. (1957–1999)	5th Cir.	Earl Warren
Edward Weinfeld	1901–1988	May 29, 1968	November 15, 1978	—	S.D.N.Y. (1950–1988)	2nd Cir.	Earl Warren
Edwin Albert Robson	1905–1986	May 29, 1968	July 1, 1979	—	N.D. Ill. (1958–1986)	7th Cir.	Earl Warren
William H. Becker	1909–1992	May 29, 1968	February 1, 1977	—	W.D. Mo. (1961–1992)	8th Cir.	Earl Warren
Joseph Simon Lord III	1912–1991	May 29, 1968	July 17, 1978	—	E.D. Pa. (1961–1991)	3rd Cir.	Earl Warren
Stanley Alexander Weigel	1905–1999	May 29, 1968	July 1, 1979	—	N.D. Cal. (1962–1997)	9th Cir.	Earl Warren
Andrew A. Caffrey	1920–1993	November 6, 1975	June 1, 1990	1980–1990	D. Mass. (1960–1993)	1st Cir.	Warren E. Burger
Roy Winfield Harper	1905–1994	February 1, 1977	September 30, 1983	—	E.D. Mo. (1947–1994)	8th Cir.	Warren E. Burger
Charles R. Weiner	1922–2005	October 25, 1978	September 30, 1983	—	E.D. Pa. (1967–2005)	3rd Cir.	Warren E. Burger
Murray Gurfein	1907–1979	November 15, 1978	December 16, 1979	1978–1979	S.D.N.Y. (1971–1974); 2nd Cir. (1974–1979)	2nd Cir.	Warren E. Burger
Edward Skottowe Northrop	1911–2003	June 6, 1979	September 30, 1983	—	D. Md. (1961–2003)	4th Cir.	Warren E. Burger
Robert Howard Schnacke	1913–1994	July 1, 1979	November 19, 1990	—	N.D. Cal. (1970–1994)	9th Cir.	Warren E. Burger
Frederick Alvin Daugherty	1914–2006	March 1, 1980	November 19, 1990	—	E.D. Okla. (1961–2006)	10th Cir.	Warren E. Burger
Sam C. Pointer Jr.	1934–2008	March 1, 1980	December 7, 1987	—	N.D. Ala. (1970–2000)	5th Cir. (to 1981); 11th Cir. (from 1981)	Warren E. Burger
Samuel Hugh Dillin	1914–2006	October 1, 1983	October 26, 1992	—	S.D. Ind. (1961–2006)	7th Cir.	Warren E. Burger
Milton Pollack	1906–2004	October 1, 1983	November 30, 1994	—	S.D.N.Y. (1967–2004)	2nd Cir.	Warren E. Burger
Louis H. Pollak	1922–2012	October 1, 1983	October 26, 1992	—	E.D. Pa. (1978–2012)	3rd Cir.	Warren E. Burger
Halbert Owen Woodward	1918–2000	March 8, 1989	June 23, 1992	—	N.D. Tex. (1968–2000)	5th Cir.	William Rehnquist
John Francis Nangle	1922–2008	June 1, 1990	December 1, 2000	1990–2000	E.D. Mo. (1973–2008)	8th Cir.	William Rehnquist
Robert R. Merhige Jr.	1919–2005	November 19, 1990	June 8, 1998	—	E.D. Va. (1967–1998)	4th Cir.	William Rehnquist
William Benner Enright	1925–2020	November 19, 1990	June 1, 2000	—	S.D. Cal. (1972–2020)	9th Cir.	William Rehnquist
Barefoot Sanders	1925–2008	October 26, 1992	June 1, 2000	—	N.D. Tex. (1979–2008)	5th Cir.	William Rehnquist
Clarence Addison Brimmer Jr.	1922–2014	October 26, 1992	June 1, 2000	—	D. Wyo. (1975–2014)	10th Cir.	William Rehnquist
John F. Grady	1929–2019	October 26, 1992	June 1, 2000	—	N.D. Ill. (1975–2019)	7th Cir.	William Rehnquist
Louis Bechtle	1927–2024	December 6, 1994	June 29, 2001	—	E.D. Pa. (1972–2001)	3rd Cir.	William Rehnquist
John F. Keenan	1929–2024	June 8, 1998	June 1, 2006	—	S.D.N.Y. (1983–2024)	2nd Cir.	William Rehnquist
William Terrell Hodges	1934–2022	June 1, 2000	June 13, 2007	2000–2007	M.D. Fla. (1971–2022)	11th Cir.	William Rehnquist
Morey Leonard Sear	1929–2004	June 1, 2000	December 31, 2002	—	E.D. La. (1976–2004)	5th Cir.	William Rehnquist
Bruce M. Selya	1934–2025	June 1, 2000	June 1, 2004	—	D.R.I. (1982–1986); 1st Cir. (1986–2025)	1st Cir.	William Rehnquist
Julia Smith Gibbons	1950–present	June 1, 2000	December 30, 2003	—	W.D. Tenn. (1983–2002); 6th Cir. (2002–present)	6th Cir.	William Rehnquist
D. Lowell Jensen	1928–present	December 1, 2000	June 1, 2008	—	N.D. Cal. (1986–2014)	9th Cir.	William Rehnquist
J. Frederick Motz	1942–2023	July 13, 2001	June 1, 2009	—	D. Md. (1985–2023)	4th Cir.	William Rehnquist
Robert Lowell Miller Jr.	1950–present	January 1, 2003	October 15, 2010	—	N.D. Ind. (1985–present)	7th Cir.	William Rehnquist
Kathryn H. Vratil	1949–present	February 2, 2004	October 15, 2013	—	D. Kan. (1992–present)	10th Cir.	William Rehnquist
David R. Hansen	1938–present	July 9, 2004	May 1, 2011	—	N.D. Iowa (1986–1991); 8th Cir. (1991–present)	8th Cir.	William Rehnquist
Anthony Joseph Scirica	1940–present	June 1, 2006	June 15, 2008	—	E.D. Pa. (1984–1987); 3rd Cir. (1987–present)	3rd Cir.	John Roberts
John G. Heyburn II	1948–2015	June 14, 2007	October 15, 2014	2007–2014	W.D. Ky. (1992–2015)	6th Cir.	John Roberts
William Royal Furgeson Jr.	1941–present	September 22, 2008	May 31, 2013	—	N.D. Tex. (1994–2013)	5th Cir.	John Roberts
Frank C. Damrell Jr.	1938–present	December 9, 2008	October 15, 2011	—	E.D. Cal. (1997–2011)	9th Cir.	John Roberts
David G. Trager	1937–2011	October 7, 2009	April 1, 2010	—	E.D.N.Y. (1993–2011)	2nd Cir.	John Roberts
Barbara S. Jones	1947–present	May 21, 2010	October 15, 2012	—	S.D.N.Y. (1995–2013)	2nd Cir.	John Roberts
Paul Barbadoro	1955–present	November 8, 2010	February 1, 2014	—	D.N.H. (1992–present)	1st Cir.	John Roberts
Marjorie Rendell	1947–present	May 24, 2011	October 15, 2018	—	E.D. Pa. (1994–1997); 3rd Cir. (1997–present)	3rd Cir.	John Roberts
Charles Breyer	1941–present	October 16, 2011	October 15, 2018	—	N.D. Cal. (1997–present)	9th Cir.	John Roberts
Lewis A. Kaplan	1944–present	October 24, 2012	October 15, 2019	—	S.D.N.Y. (1994–present)	2nd Cir.	John Roberts
Sarah S. Vance	1950–present	June 1, 2013	October 15, 2019	2014–2019	E.D. La. (1994–present)	5th Cir.	John Roberts
Ellen Segal Huvelle	1948–present	October 16, 2013	October 15, 2020	—	D.D.C. (1999–present)	D.C. Cir.	John Roberts
R. David Proctor	1960–present	April 11, 2014	October 15, 2020	—	N.D. Ala. (2003–2026)	11th Cir.	John Roberts
Catherine D. Perry	1952–present	October 8, 2014	October 15, 2021	—	E.D. Mo. (1994–present)	8th Cir.	John Roberts
Karen K. Caldwell	1956–present	October 16, 2018	present	2019–present	E.D. Ky. (2001–present)	6th Cir.	John Roberts
Nathaniel M. Gorton	1938–present	October 16, 2018	April 15, 2026	—	D. Mass. (1992–present)	1st Cir.	John Roberts
Matthew Kennelly	1956–present	October 16, 2019	present	—	N.D. Ill. (1999–present)	7th Cir.	John Roberts
David C. Norton	1946–present	October 16, 2019	present	—	D.S.C. (1990–present)	4th Cir.	John Roberts
Roger Benitez	1950–present	October 16, 2020	April 3, 2026	—	S.D. Cal. (2004–2026)	9th Cir.	John Roberts
Dale A. Kimball	1939–present	October 16, 2020	present	—	D. Utah (1997–present)	10th Cir.	John Roberts
Madeline Cox Arleo	1963–present	October 16, 2021	present	—	D.N.J. (2014–present)	3rd Cir.	John Roberts
M. Casey Rodgers	1964–present	April 16, 2026	present	—	N.D. Fla. (2003–present)	11th Cir.	John Roberts
Richard Seeborg	1956–present	June 3, 2026	present	—	N.D. Cal. (2010–present)	9th Cir.	John Roberts
