= Maria Lanahan =

American judge (born 1987)

Maria Ann Lanahan
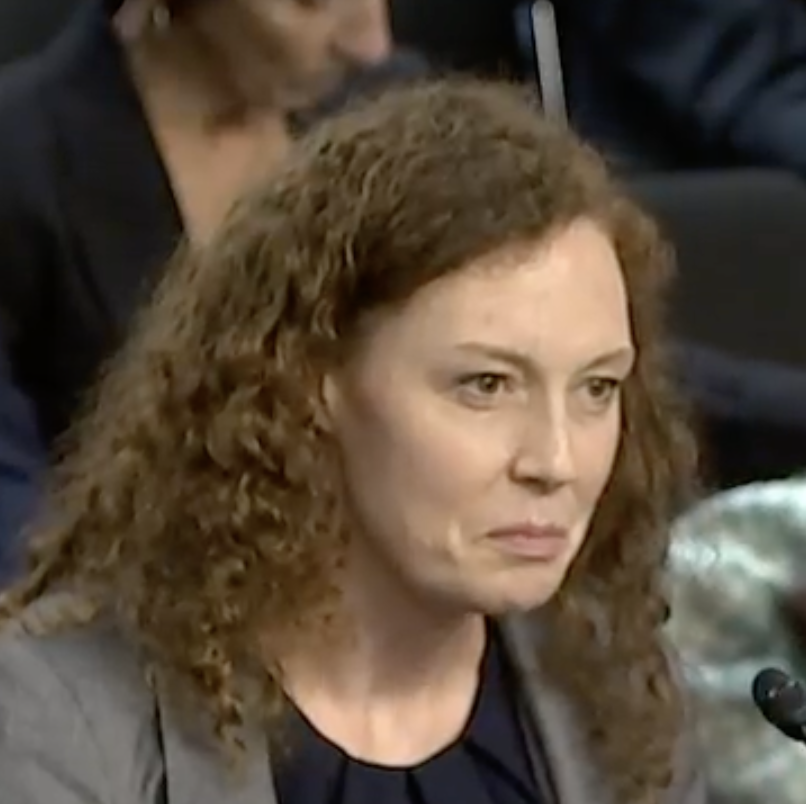

Judge of the United States District Court for the Eastern District of Missouri
- Incumbent
- Assumed office September 24, 2025
- Appointed by: Donald Trump
- Preceded by: Ronnie L. White

Personal details
- Born: Maria Ann Hassett; 1987 (age 38–39) Portland, Oregon, U.S.
- Education: Gonzaga University (BA); University of Chicago (JD)

Maria Ann Lanahan (née Hassett; born 1987) is an American lawyer who serves as a United States district judge of the United States District Court for the Eastern District of Missouri. She served as a deputy solicitor general of the state of Missouri from 2021 to 2025.

== Early life, education and career ==
Lanahan was born Maria Ann Hassett in 1987 in Portland, Oregon. She received dual Bachelor of Arts degrees, summa cum laude, in 2009 from Gonzaga University in economics and political science. She received a Juris Doctor from the University of Chicago Law School in 2013, where she was articles editor of the University of Chicago Law Review. She was a law clerk for Justice Brian Zahra of the Michigan Supreme Court from 2013 to 2014. She worked as a business litigation associate at Thompson Coburn LLP in their St. Louis office from 2014 to 2018. She was a senior manager counsel in litigation for Charter Communications from 2018 to 2020. She clerked for Judge Raymond Gruender of the United States Court of Appeals for the Eighth Circuit from 2020 to 2021. She was a deputy solicitor general for Missouri from 2021 to 2025.

Lanahan is a member of the Federalist Society.

=== Federal judicial service ===
On May 6, 2025, President Donald Trump announced his intention to nominate Lanahan to an unspecified seat on the United States District Court for the Eastern District of Missouri. On May 12, 2025, her nomination was sent to the Senate. President Trump nominated Lanahan to the seat vacated by Judge Ronnie L. White, who retired on July 31, 2024. On June 26, her nomination was favorably reported out of committee by a 12–10 party-line vote. On September 4, cloture was invoked on her nomination by a 53–45 vote. On September 9, her nomination was confirmed by a 52–45 vote. She received her judicial commission on September 24, 2025.

Legal offices
| Preceded by Ronnie L. White | Judge of the United States District Court for the Eastern District of Missouri; 2025–present | Incumbent |
