= Roy Winfield Harper =

American judge

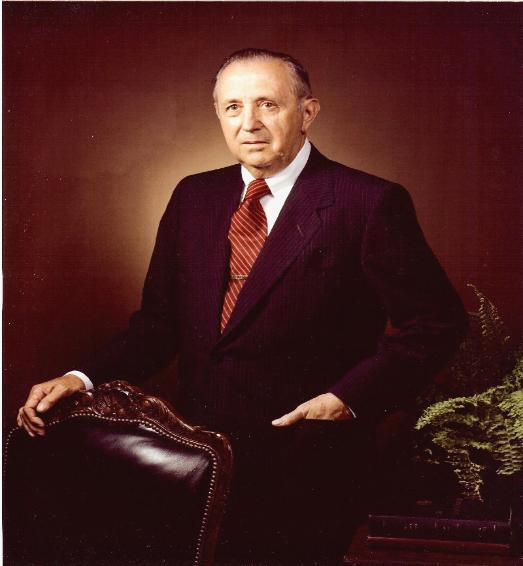

Senior Judge of the United States District Court for the Eastern District of Missouri Senior Judge of the United States District Court for the Western District of Missouri
- In office January 5, 1971 – February 13, 1994

Chief Judge of the United States District Court for the Eastern District of Missouri
- In office 1959–1971
- Preceded by: George Moore
- Succeeded by: James Hargrove Meredith

Judge of the United States District Court for the Eastern District of Missouri Judge of the United States District Court for the Western District of Missouri
- In office June 22, 1948 – January 5, 1971
- Appointed by: Harry S. Truman
- Preceded by: himself
- Succeeded by: Harris Kenneth Wangelin

Judge of the United States District Court for the Eastern District of Missouri Judge of the United States District Court for the Western District of Missouri
- In office December 20, 1947 – June 20, 1948
- Appointed by: Harry S. Truman
- Preceded by: himself
- Succeeded by: himself

Judge of the United States District Court for the Eastern District of Missouri Judge of the United States District Court for the Western District of Missouri
- In office August 7, 1947 – December 19, 1947
- Appointed by: Harry S. Truman
- Preceded by: John Caskie Collet
- Succeeded by: himself

Personal details
- Born: July 26, 1905 Gibson, Missouri, U.S.
- Died: February 12, 1994 (aged 88) Chesterfield, Missouri, U.S.
- Education: University of Missouri (AB, LLB)

Roy Winfield Harper (July 26, 1905 – February 13, 1994) was a United States district judge of the United States District Court for the Eastern District of Missouri and the United States District Court for the Western District of Missouri.

== Education and career ==
Born on July 26, 1905, in Gibson, Missouri, Harper received a Bachelor of Arts degree in 1929 from the University of Missouri and a Bachelor of Laws in 1929 from the University of Missouri School of Law. He was an attorney with the Real Estate Appraisal Division of Shell Oil Company from 1929 to 1931. He was in private practice in Steele, Missouri from 1931 to 1934 and in Caruthersville, Missouri, from 1934 to 1947. Harper was a major in the United States Army Air Corps from 1942 to 1945.

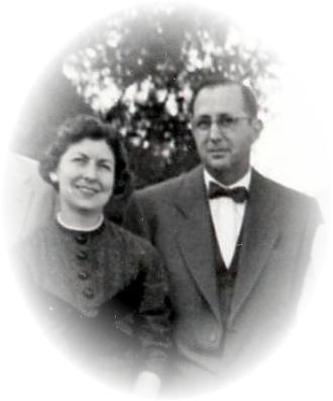
Federal Judge "Roy" Winfield Harper and his wife Ruth Butt Harper, October 30, 1954

=== Federal judicial service ===
Harper received a recess appointment from President Harry S. Truman on August 7, 1947, to a joint seat on the United States District Court for the Eastern District of Missouri and the United States District Court for the Western District of Missouri vacated by Judge John Caskie Collet. President Truman nominated Harper to a judgeship on November 24, 1947, but the United States Senate did not confirm his nomination, so his service terminated on December 19, 1947. However, President Truman gave him a second recess appointment on December 20, 1947. (Note: No additional nomination made following recess appointment of December 20, 1947; nomination of November 24, 1947, held over to following session of Congress pursuant to suspension of Rule XXXVIII, paragraph 6, of the Standing Rules of the Senate.) The Senate still did not confirm his nomination, so his service terminated on June 22, 1948. The same day, President Truman gave him yet a third recess appointment, and Truman nominated him again January 13, 1949. The Senate finally confirmed Harper on January 31, 1949, and he received his commission on February 2, 1949. He served as Chief Judge of the Eastern District from 1959 to 1971, and he was a member of the Judicial Conference of the United States from 1965 to 1971. On January 5, 1971, Judge Harper assumed senior status. He was a member of the Judicial Panel on Multidistrict Litigation from 1977 to 1983. Harper died February 13, 1994, in Chesterfield, Missouri.

== Bibliography ==
- Missouri Historical Society St. Louis, Missouri, Roy W. Harper family papers, 1950–1990. 7 boxes; collection contains case files, printed opinions, correspondence, and miscellaneous papers. The collection remained unprocessed as of August 1997.
- University of Missouri and the State Historical Society of Missouri Western Historical Manuscript Collection Columbia, Missouri
- Paul Caruthers Jones papers, 1943–1969; 60 ft.; finding aid; 13 folders pertaining to Harper.
- Forrest Smith papers, 1940–1953; 6,658 folders, 11 vols., and 8 card files; finding aid; represented.
- George A. Spencer papers, 1948–1960; 653 folders, 9 boxes, and 1 vol.; finding aid; restricted; represented.

== See also ==
- List of United States federal judges by longevity of service

Legal offices
Preceded by John Caskie Collet	Judge of the United States District Court for the Eastern District of Missouri; Judge of the United States District Court for the Western District of Missouri; 1947	Succeeded by himself
Preceded by himself	Judge of the United States District Court for the Eastern District of Missouri; Judge of the United States District Court for the Western District of Missouri; 1947–1948	Succeeded by himself
Preceded by himself	Judge of the United States District Court for the Eastern District of Missouri; Judge of the United States District Court for the Western District of Missouri; 1948–1971	Succeeded by Harris Kenneth Wangelin
Preceded by George Moore	Chief Judge of the United States District Court for the Eastern District of Missouri; 1959–1971	Succeeded by James Hargrove Meredith
