= Zack Bluestone =

American judge (born 1986)

Zachary Maxwell Bluestone
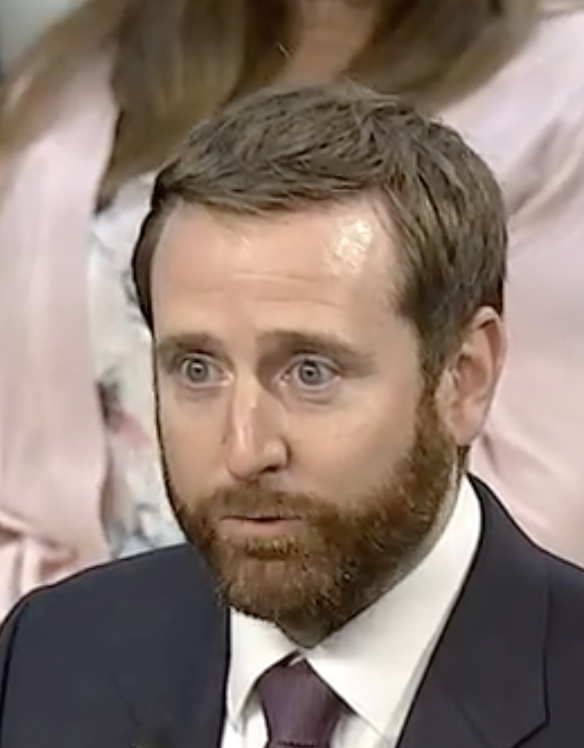

Judge of the United States District Court for the Eastern District of Missouri
- Incumbent
- Assumed office July 24, 2025
- Appointed by: Donald Trump
- Preceded by: John Andrew Ross

Personal details
- Born: 1986 (age 39–40) Chesterfield, Missouri, U.S.
- Education: Georgetown University (BS); University of Oxford (MBA); Harvard University (JD)

Zachary Maxwell Bluestone (born 1986) is an American lawyer who serves as a United States district judge of the United States District Court for the Eastern District of Missouri since 2025. He was previously an assistant United States attorney for the same district.

== Early life and education ==
Bluestone was born in 1986 in Chesterfield, Missouri. He received his Bachelor of Science degree, summa cum laude, from the Walsh School of Foreign Service at Georgetown University in 2009, his Master of Business Administration degree from the Saïd Business School at the University of Oxford in 2011, and his Juris Doctor from Harvard Law School in 2016, where he served as the managing editor of the Harvard Journal of Law & Public Policy. He was a law clerk for Judge Raymond W. Gruender of the United States Court of Appeals for the Eighth Circuit from 2016 to 2018.

== Career ==
From 2012 to 2013, Bluestone was an intern at the Administrative Office of the United States Courts. In 2014, Bluestone was an intern for the Office of the Chief Prosecutor in the U.S. Department of Defense's Office of Military Commissions. From 2015 to 2016, he was an intern for U.S. Senator Orrin Hatch. Bluestone was a deputy solicitor general for the state of Missouri from 2018 to 2020. From 2020 to 2025, he served as an assistant United States attorney in the Eastern District of Missouri at St. Louis, where he was a prosecutor in the violent crimes section (2020-2021) and later chief of the appeals section (2021-2025).

Bluestone is a member of the Federalist Society.

=== Federal judicial service ===
On May 6, 2025, President Donald Trump announced his intention to nominate Bluestone to an unspecified seat on the United States District Court for the Eastern District of Missouri. On May 12, 2025, his nomination was sent to the Senate. President Trump nominated Bluestone to the seat vacated by Judge John Andrew Ross, who assumed senior status on June 9, 2023. On June 26, his nomination was reported out of committee by a 12–10 party-line vote. On July 23, 2025, his nomination was confirmed by a 49–47 vote. He received his judicial commission on July 24, 2025.

Legal offices
Preceded by John Andrew Ross	Judge of the United States District Court for the Eastern District of Missouri; 2025–present	Incumbent
