= James Martin (attorney) =

James Martin was a United States Attorney as well as an Assistant U.S. Attorney and for the Eastern District of Missouri, based out of St. Louis. Martin is currently a partner at Dowd Bennett LLP practicing in the areas of white-collar criminal defense, corporate governance and compliance and complex business litigation. Martin was previously in private practice at the law firm of Armstrong Teasdale concentrating in the areas of white collar defense and corporate compliance.

Attorney General John Ashcroft appointed Martin as U.S. Attorney to replace Raymond Gruender when President George W. Bush appointed him to the Eighth Circuit Court of Appeals in mid-2004. During Martin's tenure, his office settled a high-profile case against Gambro Healthcare alleging that the company had paid doctors kickbacks to get patient referrals in a scheme to defraud Medicare; the company settled for $350 million, one of the largest settlements in Justice Department history.

Martin is a graduate of University of Notre Dame and University of Michigan Law School.

Legal offices
Preceded by Raymond Gruender	45th United States Attorney United States District Court for the Eastern District of Missouri; 2004– 2005	Succeeded by Catherine Hanaway
