= John Caskie Collet =

American judge (1898–1955)

Judge of the United States Court of Appeals for the Eighth Circuit
- In office July 9, 1947 – December 5, 1955
- Appointed by: Harry S. Truman
- Preceded by: Kimbrough Stone
- Succeeded by: Charles Evans Whittaker

Judge of the United States District Court for the Eastern District of Missouri Judge of the United States District Court for the Western District of Missouri
- In office March 20, 1937 – July 11, 1947
- Appointed by: Franklin D. Roosevelt
- Preceded by: Seat established by 49 Stat. 1804
- Succeeded by: Roy Winfield Harper

Judge of the Supreme Court of Missouri
- In office 1935 – March 20, 1937
- Appointed by: Guy Brasfield Park
- Preceded by: Walter D. Coles

Personal details
- Born: John Caskie Collet; May 25, 1898 Keytesville, Missouri, U.S.
- Died: December 5, 1955 (aged 57) Kansas City, Missouri, U.S.
- Education: read law

John Caskie Collet (May 25, 1898 – December 5, 1955) was a United States circuit judge of the United States Court of Appeals for the Eighth Circuit and previously was a United States district judge of the United States District Court for the Eastern District of Missouri and the United States District Court for the Western District of Missouri.

== Education and career ==
Born in Keytesville, Missouri, Collet was in the United States Army Air Corps from 1917 to 1918, and read law in 1920. He was city attorney of Salisbury, Missouri from 1922 to 1924, and then county prosecutor for Chariton County, Missouri from 1925 to 1929. He then served as assistant counsel to the Missouri State Highway Department from 1930 to 1933. He became Chairman of the Missouri Public Service Commission in 1933, and then became a Judge of the Missouri Supreme Court from 1935 to 1937.

== Federal judicial service ==
Collet was nominated by President Franklin D. Roosevelt on March 9, 1937, to the United States District Court for the Eastern District of Missouri and the United States District Court for the Western District of Missouri, to a new joint seat authorized by 49 Stat. 1804. He was confirmed by the United States Senate on March 15, 1937, and received his commission on March 20, 1937. His service terminated on July 11, 1947, due to his elevation to the Eighth Circuit.

Collet was nominated by President Harry S. Truman on April 30, 1947, to a seat on the United States Court of Appeals for the Eighth Circuit vacated by Judge Kimbrough Stone. He was confirmed by the Senate on July 8, 1947, and received his commission on July 9, 1947. His service terminated on December 5, 1955, due to his death in Kansas City, Missouri.

== Sources ==
Political offices
Preceded by Walter D. Coles	Justice of the Missouri Supreme Court; 1935–1937	Succeeded by James Marsh Douglas
Legal offices
Preceded by Seat established by 49 Stat. 1804	Judge of the United States District Court for the Eastern District of Missouri; Judge of the United States District Court for the Western District of Missouri; 1937–1947	Succeeded by Roy Winfield Harper
Preceded by Kimbrough Stone	Judge of the United States Court of Appeals for the Eighth Circuit; 1947–1955	Succeeded by Charles Evans Whittaker
