= Sarah Pitlyk =

American judge (born 1977)

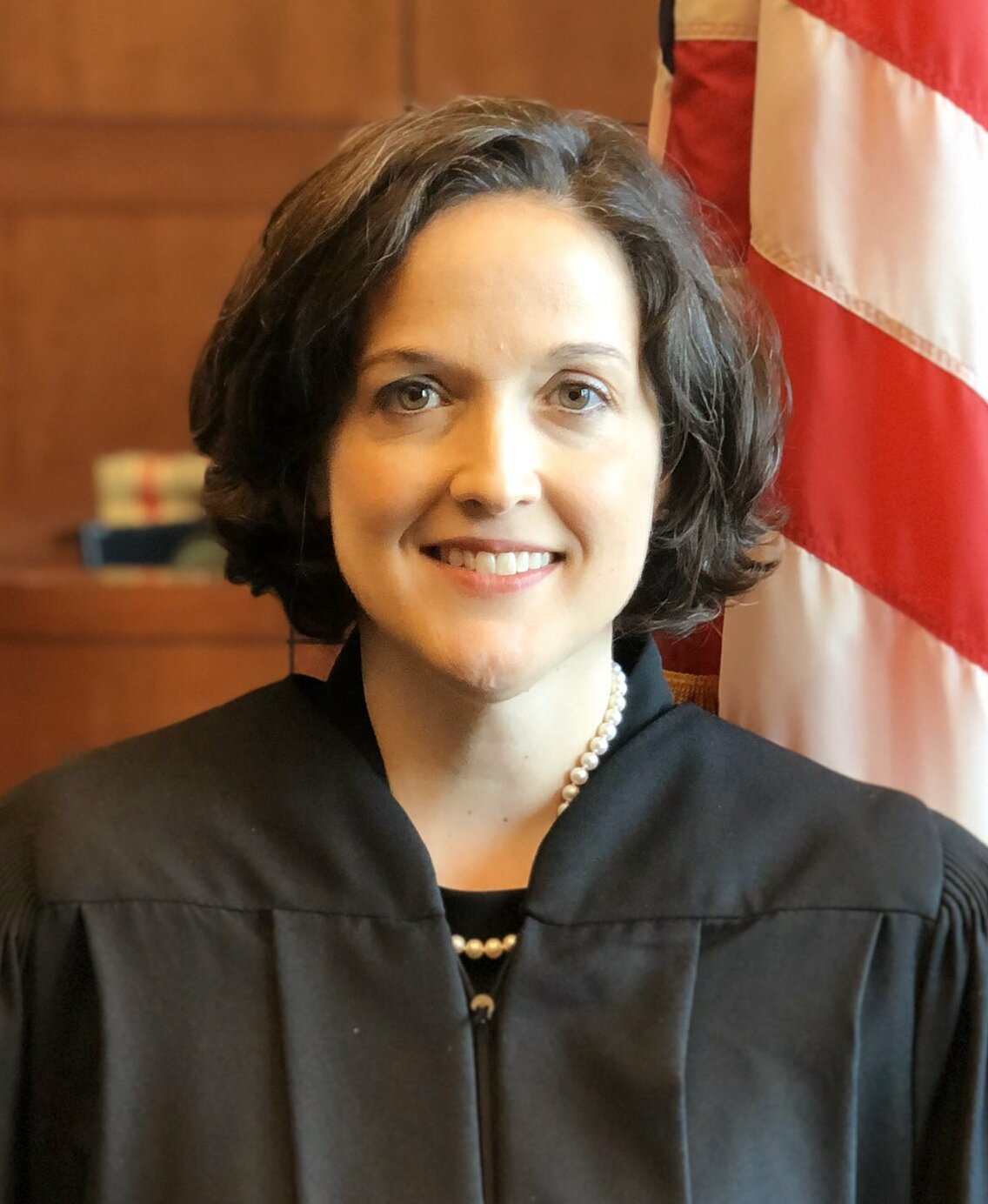

Judge of the United States District Court for the Eastern District of Missouri
- Incumbent
- Assumed office December 5, 2019
- Appointed by: Donald Trump
- Preceded by: Catherine D. Perry

Personal details
- Born: Sarah Elizabeth Martin; 1977 (age 48–49) Indianapolis, Indiana, U.S.
- Education: Boston College (BA); Georgetown University (MA); KU Leuven (MA); Yale University (JD)

Sarah Elizabeth Martin Pitlyk (née Martin; born 1977) is a United States district judge of the United States District Court for the Eastern District of Missouri.

== Education ==
Pitlyk earned her Bachelor of Arts, summa cum laude, from Boston College. She received Master of Arts degrees from both Georgetown University and KU Leuven (Belgium), where she studied as a Fulbright Scholar. Pitlyk earned her Juris Doctor from Yale Law School.

== Career ==
Upon graduation from law school, Pitlyk served as a law clerk to Judge Brett Kavanaugh of the United States Court of Appeals for the District of Columbia Circuit. She worked at Clark & Sauer LLC, a civil litigation firm in St. Louis, Missouri, and was an associate at Covington & Burling in Washington, D.C. She was special counsel at the Thomas More Society, where her practice focused on constitutional and civil rights litigation.

In 2018, Pitlyk publicly supported Brett Kavanaugh, whom she had clerked for, during his Supreme Court nomination.

=== Federal judicial service ===
On August 14, 2019, President Donald Trump announced his intent to nominate Pitlyk to serve as a United States district judge for the United States District Court for the Eastern District of Missouri. On September 9, 2019, her nomination was sent to the Senate. President Trump nominated Pitlyk to the seat vacated by Judge Catherine D. Perry, who assumed senior status on December 31, 2018.

On September 24, 2019, the American Bar Association (ABA) unanimously rated Pitlyk as "Not Qualified." The ABA said Pitlyk's rating was based on her lack of trial experience, as she had "never tried a case," she had "never examined a witness," she had "not taken a deposition," she had "not argued any motion in a state or federal trial court," she had "never picked a jury," and she had "never participated at any stage of a criminal matter." Pitlyk said one reason she had never tried a case and never taken a deposition is that she has been a member of legal teams that have allowed her to arrange her schedule in order to spend more time with her children.

On September 25, 2019, a hearing on her nomination was held before the Senate Judiciary Committee. At the hearing, Democratic Senator Dick Durbin expressed concerns about Pitlyk's lack of trial experience, and other Democratic Senators including Richard Blumenthal asked her about her anti-abortion views; she responded that her personal views would not affect her work as a judge. As a lawyer, Pitlyk had argued that frozen embryos from in vitro fertilisation should legally be considered human beings, and she wrote an amicus brief stating that "surrogacy has grave effects on society." On October 31, 2019, her nomination was reported out of committee by a 12–10 vote.

On December 3, 2019, the United States Senate invoked cloture on her nomination by a 50–43 vote, with Maine senator Susan Collins voting against her nomination. On December 4, 2019, her nomination was confirmed by a 49–44 vote. She received her judicial commission on December 5, 2019, and was sworn into office on December 6, 2019.

== Memberships ==
She has been a member of the Federalist Society since 2006.

== See also ==
- Donald Trump Supreme Court candidates

Legal offices
| Preceded by Catherine D. Perry | Judge of the United States District Court for the Eastern District of Missouri; 2019–present | Incumbent |
