= Charles Alexander Shaw =

American judge (1944–2020)

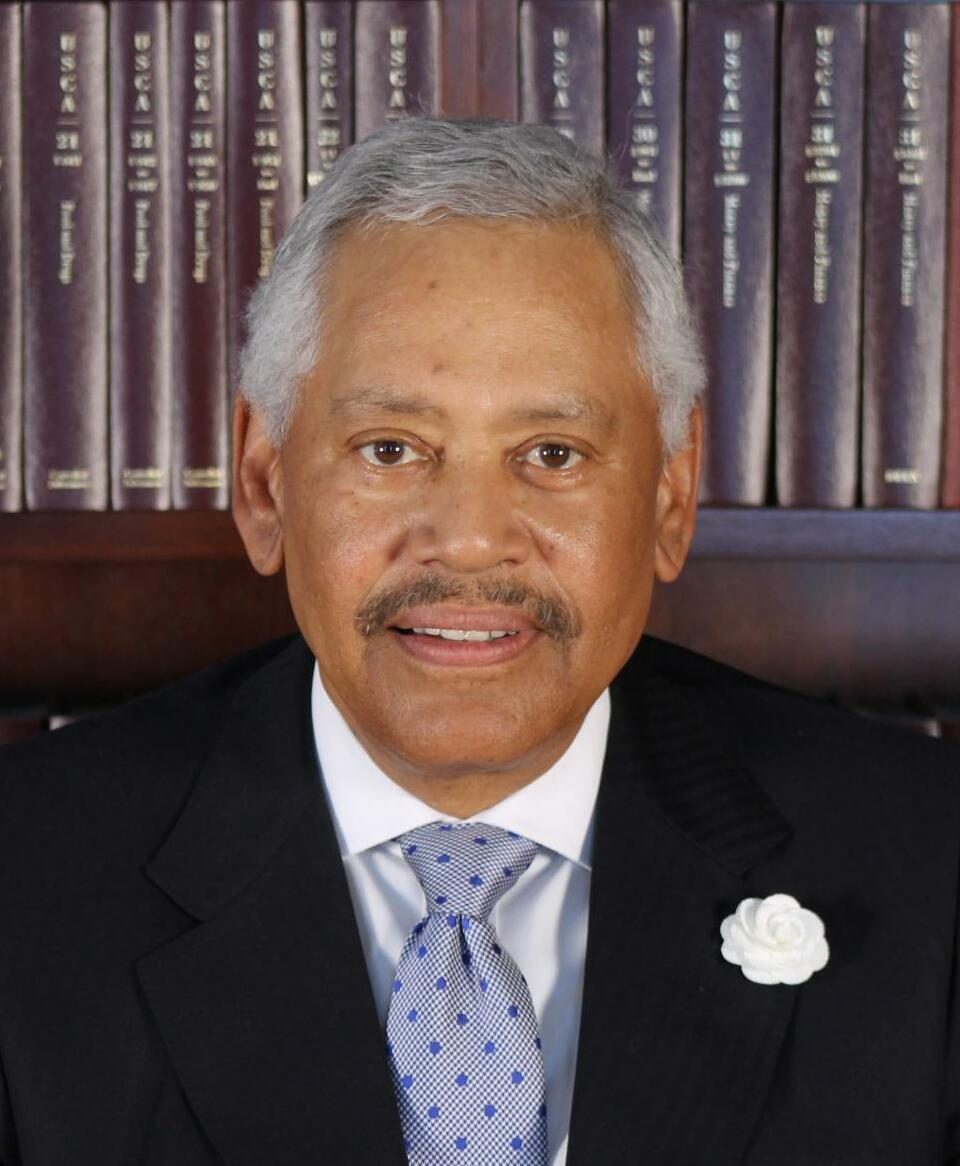

Senior Judge of the United States District Court for the Eastern District of Missouri
- In office December 31, 2009 – April 12, 2020

Judge of the United States District Court for the Eastern District of Missouri
- In office November 22, 1993 – December 31, 2009
- Appointed by: Bill Clinton
- Preceded by: Seat established by 104 Stat. 5089
- Succeeded by: John Andrew Ross

Personal details
- Born: December 31, 1944 Jackson, Tennessee, U.S.
- Died: April 12, 2020 (aged 75) St. Louis, Missouri, U.S.
- Education: Harris Stowe State College (B.A.); University of Missouri (M.B.A.); Columbus School of Law (J.D.)

Charles Alexander Shaw (December 31, 1944 – April 12, 2020) was a United States district judge of the United States District Court for the Eastern District of Missouri.

== Education and career ==
Born in Jackson, Tennessee, Shaw received a Bachelor of Arts degree from Harris Stowe State College in 1966, a Master of Business Administration from the University of Missouri in 1971, and a Juris Doctor from the Columbus School of Law at the Catholic University of America in 1974. He was an attorney with the appellate branch of the Division of Enforcement for the National Labor Relations Board from 1974 to 1976. He entered private practice in St. Louis, Missouri from 1976 to 1980, and then worked as an Assistant United States Attorney for the Eastern District of Missouri from 1980 to 1987. He then became a state court judge in Missouri's 22nd Judicial Circuit from 1987 to 1993.

== Federal judicial service ==
On October 25, 1993, Shaw was nominated by President Bill Clinton to a new seat on the United States District Court for the Eastern District of Missouri, created by 104 Stat. 5089. He was confirmed by the United States Senate on November 20, 1993, and received his commission on November 22, 1993. He assumed senior status on December 31, 2009 and died on April 12, 2020, aged 75.

== See also ==
- List of African-American federal judges
- List of African-American jurists

== Sources ==
Legal offices
Preceded by Seat established by 104 Stat. 5089	Judge of the United States District Court for the Eastern District of Missouri; 1993–2009	Succeeded by John Andrew Ross
