= David P. Dyer =

American judge (1838–1924)

David Patterson Dyer
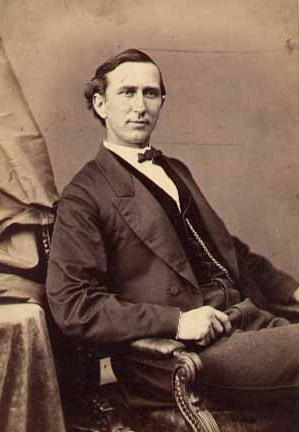

Senior Judge of the United States District Court for the Eastern District of Missouri
- In office November 3, 1919 – April 29, 1924

Judge of the United States District Court for the Eastern District of Missouri
- In office March 1, 1907 – November 3, 1919
- Appointed by: Theodore Roosevelt
- Preceded by: Gustavus A. Finkelnburg
- Succeeded by: Charles Breckenridge Faris

Member of the U.S. House of Representatives from Missouri's 9th district
- In office March 4, 1869 – March 3, 1871
- Preceded by: George Washington Anderson
- Succeeded by: Andrew King

Personal details
- Born: David Patterson Dyer; February 12, 1838 Henry County, Virginia, US
- Died: April 29, 1924 (aged 86) St. Louis, Missouri, US
- Resting place: Bellefontaine Cemetery, St. Louis
- Party: Republican
- Relatives: Leonidas C. Dyer
- Education: St. Charles College read law
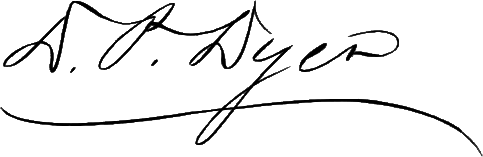
- Signature

David Patterson Dyer (February 12, 1838 – April 29, 1924) was a United States representative from Missouri and a United States district judge of the United States District Court for the Eastern District of Missouri.

== Education and career ==
Born on February 12, 1838, in Henry County, Virginia, Dyer moved with his parents to Lincoln County, Missouri in 1841 and completed preparatory studies.

He attended St. Charles College in Missouri and read law and was admitted to the bar in March 1859, in Bowling Green, Pike County, Missouri. He entered private practice in Pike County, Missouri from 1859 to 1875. He was prosecutor for the Third Judicial Circuit of Missouri in 1860. During the American Civil War, Dyer served as a private in Captain Hardin’s company, Pike County Regiment, Missouri Home Guard, and as lieutenant colonel and colonel in the 49th Missouri Infantry Regiment. He was a member of the Missouri House of Representatives from 1862 to 1865. He was Secretary of the Missouri Senate in 1866. He was a delegate to the Republican National Convention in 1868.

== Congressional service ==
Dyer was elected as a Republican from Missouri's 9th congressional district to the United States House of Representatives of the 41st United States Congress, serving from March 4, 1869 to March 3, 1871. He was an unsuccessful candidate for reelection in 1870 to the 42nd United States Congress.

== Later career ==
Following his departure from Congress, Dyer resumed private practice in St. Louis, Missouri from 1871 to 1902. He was the United States Attorney for the Eastern District of Missouri from 1875 to 1876, and from March 9, 1902 to March 31, 1907. He was an unsuccessful Republican candidate for Governor of Missouri in 1880.

== Federal judicial service ==
Dyer was nominated by President Theodore Roosevelt on February 27, 1907, to a seat on the United States District Court for the Eastern District of Missouri vacated by Judge Gustavus A. Finkelnburg. He was confirmed by the United States Senate on March 1, 1907, and received his commission the same day. He assumed senior status on November 3, 1919. His service terminated on April 29, 1924, due to his death in St. Louis. He was interred in Bellefontaine Cemetery in St. Louis.

== Family ==
Dyer was the uncle of United States Representatives Leonidas C. Dyer.

Party political offices
Preceded by Gustavus A. Finkelnburg	Republican nominee for Governor of Missouri; 1880	Succeeded by Nicholas Ford
U.S. House of Representatives
Preceded by George Washington Anderson	Member of the U.S. House of Representatives from Missouri's 9th congressional district 1869–1871	Succeeded by Andrew King
Legal offices
Preceded by Gustavus A. Finkelnburg	Judge of the United States District Court for the Eastern District of Missouri; 1907–1919	Succeeded by Charles Breckenridge Faris
