= Ronnie L. White =

American judge (born 1953)

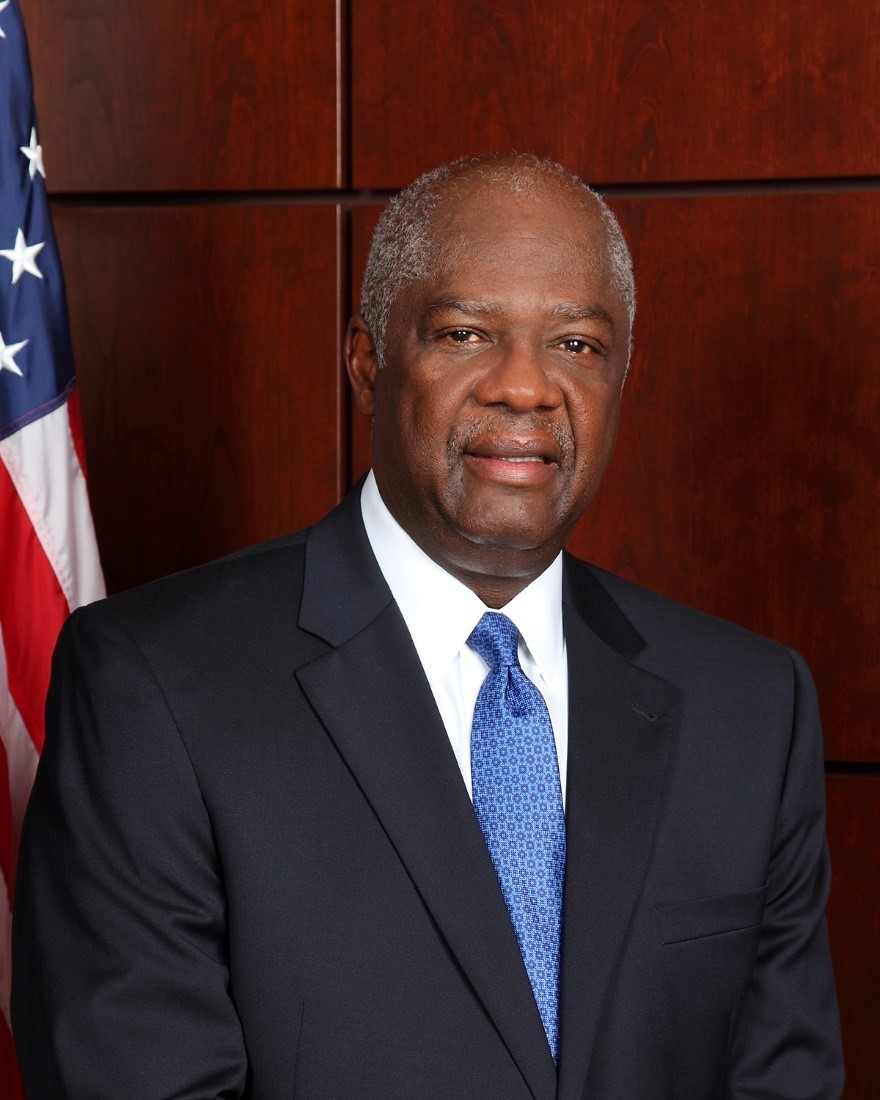

Judge of the United States District Court for the Eastern District of Missouri
- In office July 17, 2014 – July 31, 2024
- Appointed by: Barack Obama
- Preceded by: Jean Constance Hamilton
- Succeeded by: Maria Lanahan

Chief Justice of Missouri
- In office July 1, 2003 – June 30, 2005
- Preceded by: Stephen N. Limbaugh Jr.
- Succeeded by: Michael A. Wolff

Judge of the Supreme Court of Missouri
- In office October 1995 – July 6, 2007
- Appointed by: Mel Carnahan
- Preceded by: Elwood L. Thomas
- Succeeded by: Patricia Breckenridge

Personal details
- Born: May 31, 1953 (age 73) St. Louis, Missouri, U.S.
- Party: Democratic
- Education: St. Louis Community College (AA); Saint Louis University (BA); University of Missouri–Kansas City (JD)

Ronnie Lee White (born May 31, 1953) is a former United States district judge of the United States District Court for the Eastern District of Missouri and a former Missouri Supreme Court judge.

== Education and legal career ==
White received an Associate of Arts degree from St. Louis Community College in 1977 and received a Bachelor of Arts degree from Saint Louis University in 1979. He earned a Juris Doctor from the University of Missouri–Kansas City in 1983. He worked as a public defender in St. Louis and an attorney in various other government offices and was elected as a Democratic member of the Missouri House of Representatives, where he served for six years. In 1993, he was appointed as a City Counselor for St. Louis City. In May 1994, Governor Mel Carnahan appointed him a judge for the Eastern District of the Missouri Court of Appeals. Carnahan appointed White to the Supreme Court of Missouri in October 1995. He served as the court's first African-American Chief Justice from 2003 to 2005. White retired from the court on July 6, 2007, and was succeeded by Judge Patricia Breckenridge.

=== Federal judicial service ===
==== First nomination to federal district court ====
In 1997, President Bill Clinton nominated White for a United States district court seat. White's nomination passed the United States Senate Committee on the Judiciary, but ran into resistance from then-Senator John Ashcroft in 1999. Ashcroft claimed White was "pro-criminal" due to White's opinions in death penalty cases before the Supreme Court and cited opposition from Missouri police associations that were later discovered to be all-white. Carnahan and other Democrats criticized Republican opposition to the nomination, and it quickly became embroiled with racial overtones and an issue in the United States Senate election in Missouri the following year. On October 5, 1999, the United States Senate rejected White's nomination by a 45–54 vote. Ashcroft's opposition to White hurt him both in the 2000 Senate election, which he narrowly lost for a variety of reasons, and during his confirmation hearings when he was appointed United States Attorney General in 2001.

==== Second nomination to federal district court ====
On November 7, 2013, President Barack Obama nominated White to serve on the United States District Court for the Eastern District of Missouri. He received a hearing before the United States Senate Judiciary Committee on May 20, 2014. On June 19, 2014, his nomination was reported out of committee by a 10–8 vote. On July 14, 2014, Senate Majority Leader Harry Reid filed a motion to invoke cloture on the nomination. On July 16, 2014, the United States Senate invoked cloture on White's nomination by a 54–43 vote. Later that day, his nomination was confirmed by a 53–44 vote. He received his judicial commission on July 17, 2014. He retired from active service on July 31, 2024.

== See also ==
- Barack Obama judicial appointment controversies
- List of African American federal judges
- List of African American jurists

Legal offices
Preceded by Jean Constance Hamilton	Judge of the United States District Court for the Eastern District of Missouri; 2014–2024	Succeeded by Maria Lanahan
