= Troy High School (Kansas) =

Public high school in Troy, Kansas

Coordinates: 39.7840°N 95.0956°W

Troy High School is in Troy, Kansas. The school's mascot is a Trojan.

Supreme Court Justice Charles Evans Whittaker attended Troy High School until his mother died on his 16th birthday and he dropped out to work with his father on the farm and hunt game.

== See also ==
- List of high schools in Kansas
