= Clyde S. Cahill Jr. =

American judge

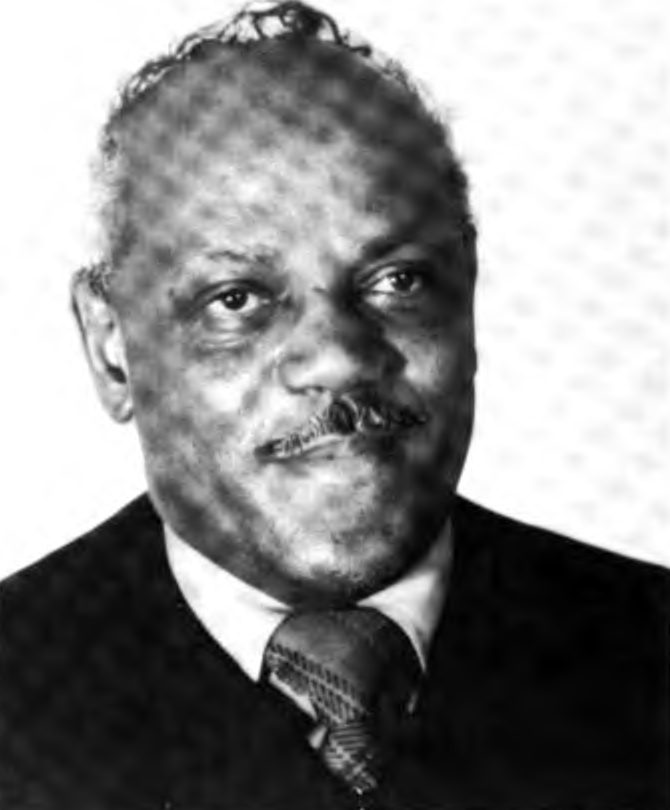

Senior Judge of the United States District Court for the Eastern District of Missouri
- In office April 9, 1992 – August 18, 2004

Judge of the United States District Court for the Eastern District of Missouri
- In office May 23, 1980 – April 9, 1992
- Appointed by: Jimmy Carter
- Preceded by: James Hargrove Meredith
- Succeeded by: Catherine D. Perry

Personal details
- Born: Clyde Sylvester Cahill Jr. April 9, 1923 St. Louis, Missouri, U.S.
- Died: August 18, 2004 (aged 81) St. Louis, Missouri, U.S.
- Education: Saint Louis University (BS); Saint Louis University School of Law (JD)

Clyde Sylvester Cahill Jr. (April 9, 1923 – August 18, 2004) was a United States district judge of the United States District Court for the Eastern District of Missouri.

== Education and career ==
Born in St. Louis, Missouri, Cahill was in the United States Air Force from 1942 to 1946, and then received a Bachelor of Science degree from Saint Louis University in 1949. He received a Juris Doctor from Saint Louis University School of Law in 1951, and was thereafter in private practice in St. Louis until 1954. He was an assistant circuit attorney for the city of St. Louis from 1954 to 1961, and then returned to private practice while serving as a special assistant circuit attorney from 1961 to 1964. He was the chief legal advisor for the Missouri NAACP from 1958 to 1965. He was a regional attorney for the United States Office of Economic Opportunity in Kansas City, Missouri from 1966 to 1968, and then the general manager of the Human Development Corporation in St. Louis from 1968 to 1972. He was executive director and general counsel for the Legal Aid Society of St. Louis from 1972 to 1975, when he became a Circuit Judge of the 22nd Judicial Circuit of the State of Missouri, so remaining until 1980.

== Federal judicial service ==
On April 2, 1980, President Jimmy Carter nominated Cahill to a seat on the United States District Court for the Eastern District of Missouri vacated by Judge James Hargrove Meredith. Cahill was confirmed by the United States Senate on May 21, 1980, and received his commission on May 23, 1980. He assumed senior status on April 9, 1992, and served in that capacity until his death on August 18, 2004, in St. Louis.

== See also ==
- List of African-American federal judges
- List of African-American jurists

== Sources ==
Legal offices
Preceded by James Hargrove Meredith	Judge of the United States District Court for the Eastern District of Missouri; 1980–1992	Succeeded by Catherine D. Perry
