= Henry Autrey =

American judge (born 1952)

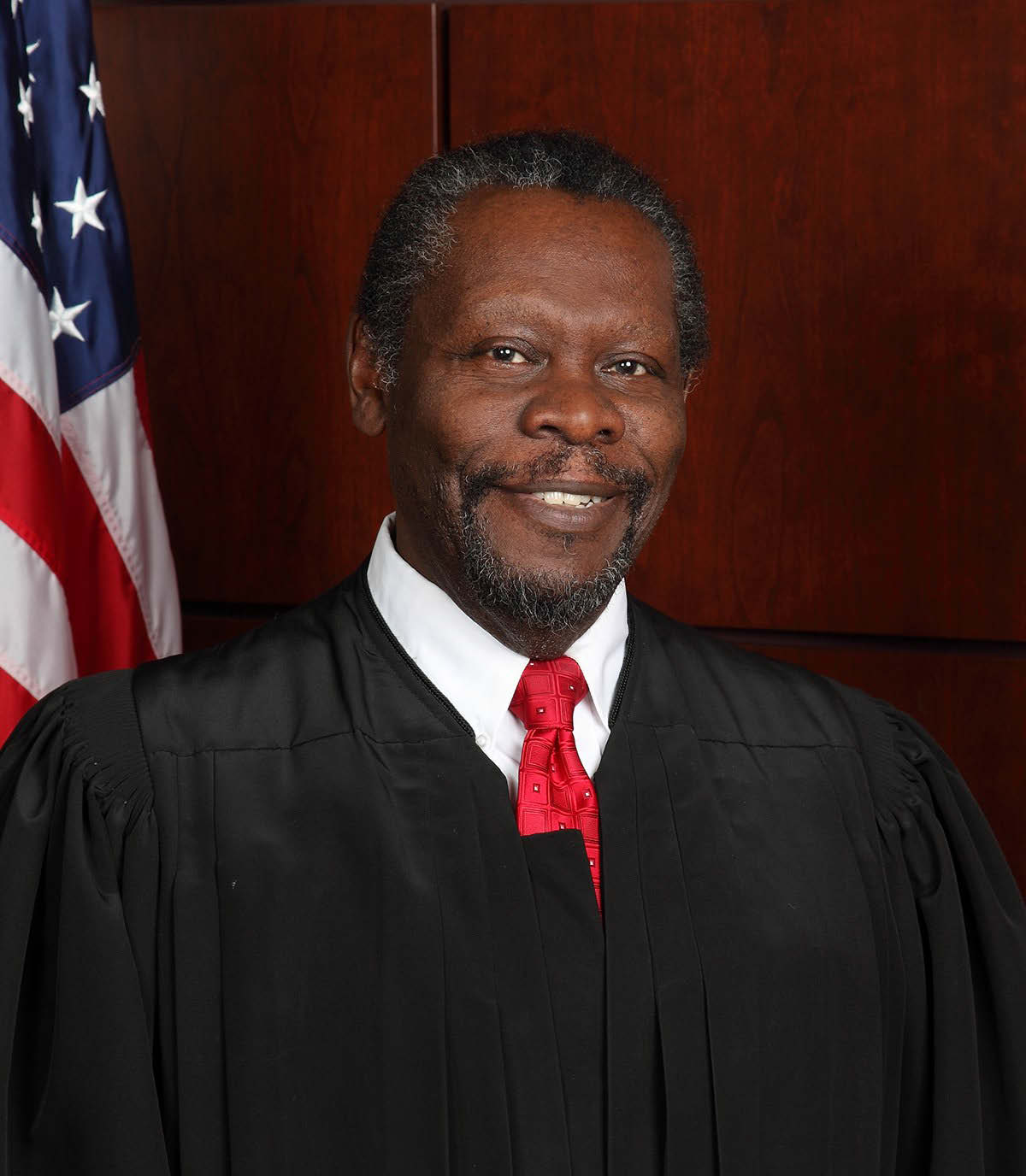

Judge of the United States District Court for the Eastern District of Missouri
- Incumbent
- Assumed office August 2, 2002
- Appointed by: George W. Bush
- Preceded by: George F. Gunn Jr.

Personal details
- Born: Henry Edward Autrey; March 18, 1952 (age 74) Mobile, Alabama, U.S.
- Education: St. Louis University (BS, JD)

Henry Edward Autrey (born March 18, 1952) is a United States district judge of the United States District Court for the Eastern District of Missouri.

== Education and career ==
Autrey was born in Mobile, Alabama. He received a Bachelor of Arts degree from Saint Louis University in 1974 and a Juris Doctor from Saint Louis University School of Law in 1977. He was an assistant circuit attorney for the City of St. Louis from 1977 to 1984, and then first assistant circuit attorney in that office from 1984 to 1986. In 1986, he became an Associate Judge for the 22nd. Judicial Circuit Court of the City of St. Louis, until 1997 when he became a circuit judge, a position he held until 2002.

=== Federal judicial service ===
On March 21, 2002, Autrey was nominated by President George W. Bush to a seat on the United States District Court for the Eastern District of Missouri, vacated by Judge George F. Gunn Jr.. Autrey was confirmed by the United States Senate on August 1, 2002, and received his commission the following day.

== See also ==
- List of African-American federal judges
- List of African-American jurists

== Sources ==
Legal offices
| Preceded by George F. Gunn Jr. | Judge of the United States District Court for the Eastern District of Missouri; 2002–present | Incumbent |
