= Andrew King (American politician) =

American lawyer and politician (1812–1895)

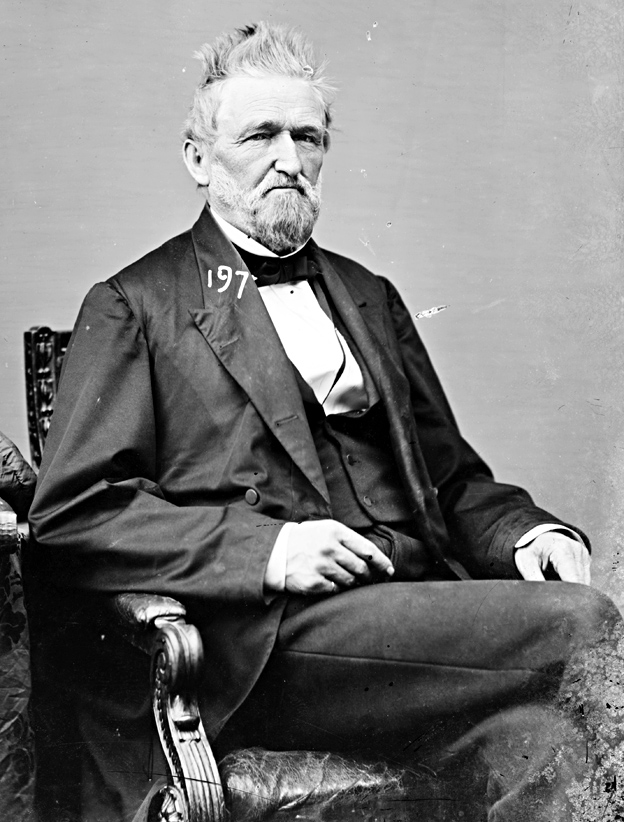

Member of the U.S. House of Representatives from Missouri's 9th district
- In office March 4, 1871 – March 3, 1873
- Preceded by: David P. Dyer
- Succeeded by: Isaac C. Parker

Member of the Missouri Senate
- In office 1846

Member of the Missouri House of Representatives
- In office 1858

Personal details
- Born: March 20, 1812 Greenbrier County, Virginia, US
- Died: November 18, 1895 (aged 83) Jefferson City, Missouri, US
- Relations: Benjamin Holliday (cousin)
- Occupation: Lawyer, politician

Andrew King (March 20, 1812 – November 18, 1895) was an American lawyer and politician. He served as a member of the United States House of Representatives from Missouri.

== Biography ==
King was born on March 20, 1812, in Greenbrier County, Virginia. He was a maternal cousin of military officer and publisher Benjamin Holliday. He attended public schools and studied law. After being admitted to the bar, he practiced law in St. Charles, Missouri. In the 1840s and 1850s, he and Benjamin Emmons were publishers of The Reveille, a greater St. Louis newspaper. He owned slaves.

A Democrat, King represented the 1st district in the Missouri Senate in 1846, and in the Missouri House of Representatives in 1858, and possibly more terms. From 1859 to 1864, he was judge of the Missouri 19th Judicial Circuit Court. He was elected to the United States House of Representatives and represented Missouri's 9th congressional district from March 4, 1871, to March 3, 1873.

While serving as a representative, King stayed at the Metropolitan Hotel. He served on the United States House Committee on Freedmen's Affairs. He also introduced a bill to ban interracial marriage nationwide. He proposed the bill following the passage of the Fourteenth Amendment to the United States Constitution, as he thought it could be used as a precedent to legalize interracial marriage. In 1873, he proposed a bill to require the completion of all railroads and for power brakes to be implemented in all trains. He also supported tariffs. He did not appear as a candidate in the 1872 election.

After serving in Congress, King moved to St. John, Missouri and continued practicing law. He died on November 18, 1895, aged 83, in Jefferson City, Missouri, and is buried in the Oak Grove Cemetery in St. Charles.

U.S. House of Representatives
| Preceded by David P. Dyer | Member of the U.S. House of Representatives from Missouri's 9th congressional district March 4, 1871 – March 3, 1873 | Succeeded by Isaac C. Parker |
