= Charles Breckenridge Faris =

American judge (1864–1938)

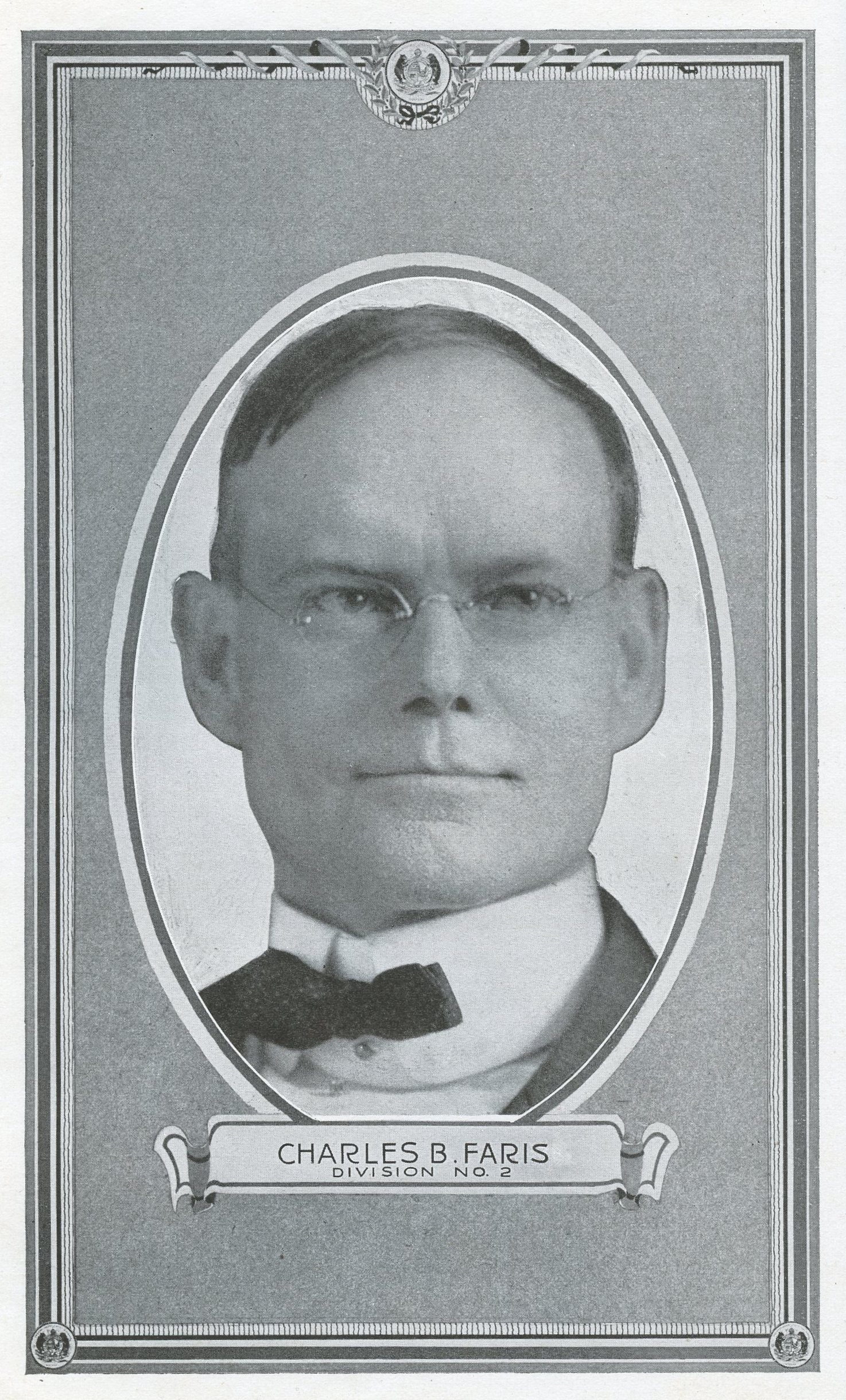

Senior Judge of the United States Court of Appeals for the Eighth Circuit
- In office November 30, 1935 – December 18, 1938

Judge of the United States Court of Appeals for the Eighth Circuit
- In office January 31, 1935 – November 30, 1935
- Appointed by: Franklin D. Roosevelt
- Preceded by: William S. Kenyon
- Succeeded by: Seth Thomas

Judge of the United States District Court for the Eastern District of Missouri
- In office October 13, 1919 – February 6, 1935
- Appointed by: Woodrow Wilson
- Preceded by: David Patterson Dyer
- Succeeded by: George Moore

Judge of the Supreme Court of Missouri
- In office 1912–1919
- Appointed by: Herbert Spencer Hadley
- Preceded by: Franklin Ferriss
- Succeeded by: Edward Higbee

Personal details
- Born: Charles Breckenridge Faris; October 3, 1864 Charleston, Missouri, U.S.
- Died: December 18, 1938 (aged 74)
- Education: Washington University in St. Louis; University of Missouri (BL, BPd)

Charles Breckenridge Faris (October 3, 1864 – December 18, 1938) was a United States circuit judge of the United States Court of Appeals for the Eighth Circuit and a United States district judge of the United States District Court for the Eastern District of Missouri.

== Education and career ==
Born on October 3, 1864, near Charleston, Missouri, Faris attended the Washington University School of Law and then received a Bachelor of Laws and a Bachelor of Pedagogy in 1889 from the University of Missouri. He entered private practice of law in Caruthersville, Missouri from 1891 to 1892. He was city attorney of Caruthersville from 1892 to 1893. He was the prosecuting attorney of Pemiscot, Missouri from 1893 to 1899. He was the President of the Bank of Caruthersville from 1898 to 1910. He was a member of the Missouri House of Representatives of the 36th Missouri General Assembly. He was a Judge of the 28th Judicial Circuit from 1910 to 1912. He was a Judge of the Supreme Court of Missouri from 1912 to 1919.

== Federal judicial service ==
Faris was nominated by President Woodrow Wilson on October 11, 1919, to a seat on the United States District Court for the Eastern District of Missouri vacated by Judge David Patterson Dyer. He was confirmed by the United States Senate on October 13, 1919, and received his commission the same day. His service was terminated on February 6, 1935, due to his elevation to the Eighth Circuit.

Faris was nominated by President Franklin D. Roosevelt on January 14, 1935, to a seat on the United States Court of Appeals for the Eighth Circuit vacated by Judge William S. Kenyon. He was confirmed by the Senate on January 25, 1935, and received his commission on January 31, 1935. He assumed senior status on November 30, 1935. His service terminated on December 18, 1938, due to his death.

== Sources ==
Legal offices
Preceded by David Patterson Dyer	Judge of the United States District Court for the Eastern District of Missouri; 1919–1935	Succeeded by George Moore
Preceded by William S. Kenyon	Judge of the United States Court of Appeals for the Eighth Circuit; 1935	Succeeded by Seth Thomas
