= George F. Gunn Jr. =

American judge

Senior Judge of the United States District Court for the Eastern District of Missouri
- In office December 1, 1996 – May 20, 1998

Judge of the United States District Court for the Eastern District of Missouri
- In office May 10, 1985 – December 1, 1996
- Appointed by: Ronald Reagan
- Preceded by: Seat established by 98 Stat. 333
- Succeeded by: Henry Autrey

Judge of the Supreme Court of Missouri
- In office July 16, 1982 – 1985
- Appointed by: Kit Bond
- Succeeded by: Edward D. Robertson Jr.

Personal details
- Born: George F. Gunn Jr. October 29, 1927 Fort Smith, Arkansas
- Died: May 20, 1998 (aged 70) St. Louis, Missouri
- Education: Westminster College (A.B.); Washington University in St. Louis (J.D.)

George F. Gunn Jr. (October 29, 1927 – May 20, 1998) was a justice of the Supreme Court of Missouri, and later a United States district judge of the United States District Court for the Eastern District of Missouri.

== Education and career ==
Born in Fort Smith, Arkansas, Gunn was in the United States Navy from 1945 to 1946. He received an Artium Baccalaureus degree from Westminster College in 1950 and a Juris Doctor from Washington University School of Law in 1955. After leaving the navy, he worked in private practice in St. Louis, Missouri from 1955 to 1971. At the same time, he was an assistant general attorney of the Wabash Railroad in St. Louis from 1956 to 1958, a city attorney of Brentwood, Missouri from 1963 to 1971, and an attorney for the Terminal Railroad Association of St. Louis from 1968 to 1971.

== State judicial service ==
Prior to his appointment to the Supreme Court of Missouri, he was a municipal judge for Rock Hill, Missouri, from 1970 to 1971, the St. Louis County Counselor, from 1971 to 1973, and a Judge of the Missouri Court of Appeals from 1973 to 1982. In 1982, then-Governor Kit Bond appointed Gunn to the Missouri Supreme Court, where he sat until 1985.

== Federal judicial service ==
Gunn was nominated by President Ronald Reagan on April 17, 1985, to the United States District Court for the Eastern District of Missouri, to a new seat authorized by 98 Stat. 333. He was confirmed by the United States Senate on May 3, 1985, and received commission on May 10, 1985. Among the cases over which Gunn presided was a lawsuit against Dillard's Department Stores alleging religious bias, and resulting in a settlement approved by Gunn that prohibited Dillards from requiring employees to work the sabbath. He assumed senior status on December 1, 1996. His service terminated on May 20, 1998, due to his death in St. Louis of complications of cancer.

== Sources ==
Legal offices
Preceded by Seat established by 98 Stat. 333	Judge of the United States District Court for the Eastern District of Missouri; 1985–1996	Succeeded by Henry Autrey
