= Franklin Ferriss =

American judge

Benjamin Franklin Ferriss

Judge of the Supreme Court of Missouri
- In office 1910–1912
- Nominated by: Herbert Spencer Hadley
- Preceded by: Gavon D. Burgess
- Succeeded by: Charles Breckenridge Faris

Personal details
- Born: September 22, 1849 Peru, New York
- Died: November 10, 1933 (aged 84) St. Louis, Missouri
- Spouse: Elizabeth Simon
- Education: Cornell University; St. Louis Law School

Benjamin Franklin Ferriss (September 22, 1849 – November 10, 1933) was a Missouri state jurist known for his role as special master in the Standard Oil trust litigation of the Progressive Era. Franklin Ferriss was also the father of Hugh Ferriss.

== Early life and education ==
Born in Peru, New York on Lake Champlain, Ferriss was the child of Charles and Mercy (Macomber) Ferriss. He earned his Bachelor of Science degree at Cornell University in 1873, serving as Captain of the 1873 Crew Team, joined Phi Kappa Psi fraternity, and was member of the Irving Literary Society. Franklin Ferris then took his law degree at St. Louis Law School (1875), marrying Ms. Elizabeth Simon at St. Louis on Feb. 10, 1880. Elizabeth was described by one diarist as, ". . . a frank, wholesome woman, amiable & natural; no doubt a good friend and excellent mother and wife; with nothing of the precieuse offensiveness of manner . . . ." They were parents to Henry T. Ferriss, Margery Ferriss Semple, and Hugh Ferriss. The Ferriss family lived at 5828 Cabanne Avenue in St. Louis, Missouri; Judge Ferriss' chambers were at 820 Rialto Building of the same. Franklin Ferriss had a lifelong interest in music, golf and fishing.

== Practice of law ==
Commencing the practice of law at St. Louis, Missouri in 1875, the future Judge Ferriss formed the law firm of Rowell & Ferriss with his brother-in-law, Clinton Rowell. The two also practiced with Joseph Henry Zumbalen, later professor of law at Washington University in St. Louis. Ferriss also served as a Member of the St. Louis City Council (1893–97) prior to being elected circuit judge, Eighth Judicial Circuit, State of Missouri in 1898. In 1902, Judge Ferriss served on the World's Fair Law Congress Committee, preparing for the St. Louis World's Fair. He resigned from the bench in 1903 to serve as General Counsel, Louisiana Purchase Exposition Company. Ferriss was also a director of the same. During this period, the Judge was also a professor of contracts and commercial law at Washington University School of Law.

== Standard Oil litigation ==
In 1907, Ferriss was appointed by the U.S. Government to serve as special examiner in the case of United States v. Standard Oil Company. Sitting at New York and Chicago, Judge Ferriss was charged with the collecting of evidence in the complex litigation. The United States Supreme Court would later order the break-up of Standard Oil in 1911. Governor Herbert Spencer Hadley then appointed Ferriss to the Supreme Court of the State of Missouri in 1910, filling a vacancy caused by Burgess' death. His first term expired on June 1, 1913. Ferriss was succeeded on the Supreme Court of Missouri by Charles Breckenridge Faris.

== Legacy ==
Franklin and Elizabeth Ferriss' son, Hugh Ferriss (1889–1962), was an artist in the modern tradition. He graduated from Washington University in 1911. A critic of the École des Beaux-Arts, Hugh Ferriss became known for his arresting drawings of skyscrapers and futuristic cityscapes in the 1920s and 1930s. Judge Ferriss' grandson, also Franklin Ferriss (1911–2004), served as a Missouri jurist, as well. The younger Ferriss served on the St. Louis County Circuit Court from 1954 to 1981, after a stint at Slakey & Jones and in the United States Army (European Theatre, 1941–1945). He was a graduate from Yale University (1933), Columbia University (1935), and the Washington University School of Law (1948).

== Member ==
Business Men's League, Irving Literary Society (Cornell University), King's Lake Hunting & Fishing Club, Mercantile Club, Normandie Park Club, Phi Kappa Psi, Republican Party, St. Louis Club.
