= John Andrew Ross =

American judge (born 1954)

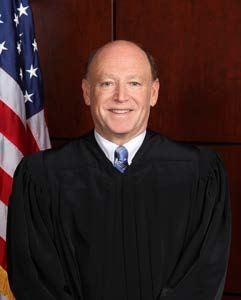

Senior Judge of the United States District Court for the Eastern District of Missouri
- Incumbent
- Assumed office June 9, 2023

Judge of the United States District Court for the Eastern District of Missouri
- In office October 11, 2011 – June 9, 2023
- Appointed by: Barack Obama
- Preceded by: Charles Alexander Shaw
- Succeeded by: Zachary Bluestone

Personal details
- Born: John Andrew Ross; June 7, 1954 (age 71) St. Louis, Missouri, U.S.
- Education: Emory University (BA, JD)

John Andrew Ross (born June 7, 1954) is an American lawyer who serves as a Senior United States district judge of the United States District Court for the Eastern District of Missouri.

== Early life and education ==
Born in St. Louis, Missouri, Ross earned a Bachelor of Arts degree in 1976 from Emory University and a Juris Doctor in 1979 from Emory University School of Law.

== Career ==
From 1979 until 1991, Ross worked for the St. Louis County Prosecuting Attorney's office, as an assistant prosecuting attorney from 1979 until 1986, as an assistant chief trial attorney from 1986 until 1988, and as a chief trial attorney from 1988 until 1991. He also served as a special assistant attorney general in the Missouri Attorney General's office in 1984, and he was a special assistant prosecuting attorney for the St. Louis County Prosecuting Attorney's office in 1989. From 1991 until 2000, Ross served as County Counselor for St. Louis County. From 2001 to 2011 he served as a circuit judge for Missouri's St. Louis County Circuit Court. He was an assistant presiding judge from 2005 until 2009, and he was presiding judge from 2009.

=== Federal judicial service ===
After he applied for a vacant federal district court seat, United States Senator Claire McCaskill personally interviewed Ross on March 13, 2010. On December 1, 2010, President Barack Obama nominated Ross to fill the vacancy created by the decision by Judge Charles Alexander Shaw to take senior status at the end of 2009. The Senate confirmed Ross by unanimous consent on September 20, 2011. He received his judicial commission on October 11, 2011. Ross took senior status on June 9, 2023.

Legal offices
| Preceded by Charles Alexander Shaw | Judge of the United States District Court for the Eastern District of Missouri; 2011–2023 | Succeeded by Zachary Bluestone |
