= Beussink v. Woodland R-IV School District =

- Court: United States District Court for the Eastern District of Missouri
- Full case name: Brandon Beussink, by and through his parent and next friend, Nadean Beussink v. Woodland R-IV School District
- Decided: December 28, 1998
- Docket nos.: 1:98-cv-00093
- Citation: 30 F. Supp. 2d 1175

Court membership
- Judge sitting: Rodney W. Sippel

Keywords
- Right of students

Beussink v. Woodland R-IV School district, 30 F. Supp. 2d 1175 (E.D. Mo. 1998), was the first case in United States law to rule on the right of students to speak off-campus in an online forum, and as result of this case, it is often cited in other off-campus online speech cases. It was decided in the United States District Court for the Eastern District of Missouri, Southeastern Division.

== Facts ==
The complainant was Brandon Beussink, "by and through his parent and next friend," Nadean Beussink, a junior at Woodland High School in Marble Hill, Missouri. In early February 1998, Beussink created a personal website on the Internet, Beussink's own personal computer and no school facilities or resources. There he made non-defamatory but highly critical remarks of administrators and their actions at Woodland High School, using vulgar language "to convey his opinion regarding the teachers, the principal and the school's own homepage."

A student who had accessed the site during school hours, with the intention of getting Beussink in trouble, showed it to a member of Woodland's faculty. The criticism upset the teacher, and consequently, the principal of the school was informed. During fourth period on the day the principal was informed, Brandon received a five-day suspension, citing the 'offensive nature' of Beussink's site as the rationale. During seventh period of the same day, Buessink's suspension was increased from 5 to 10 days. Because of the school's unauthorized absence policy, and in conjunction with Beussink's previous 8.5 days of unexcused absences, his 10-day suspension resulted in his grades being dropped by 8.5 grade levels.

== Decision ==
Beussink sued the school district in U.S. District Court, which ruled in his favor.

The presiding judge, Rodney W. Sippel, ruled that the suspension was an illegal violation of Beussink's rights under the First Amendment. Under the Supreme Court's ruling in Tinker v. Des Moines Independent Community School District, student speech is protected unless it causes a "substantial disruption" to the institution's mission of educating students, a rule known as the Tinker Test. Sippel wrote that school officials did not demonstrate that the punishment was in response to a "substantial disruption," nor did they show that the suspension "was caused by something more than a mere desire to avoid the discomfort and unpleasantness that always accompany an unpopular viewpoint." In determining whether to issue injunctive relief, the Court followed a four-part test established by the United States Court of Appeals for the Eighth Circuit in the prior case Dataphase Systems, Inc v. C.L. Systems, Inc, and ultimately determined that the remedy was appropriate.

The school was enjoined from using the ten-day suspension in applying its absenteeism policy to Beussink's grades; it was also prohibited from restricting Beussink's use of his home computer to repost his webpage.
