= Kimbrough Stone =

American judge (1875–1958)

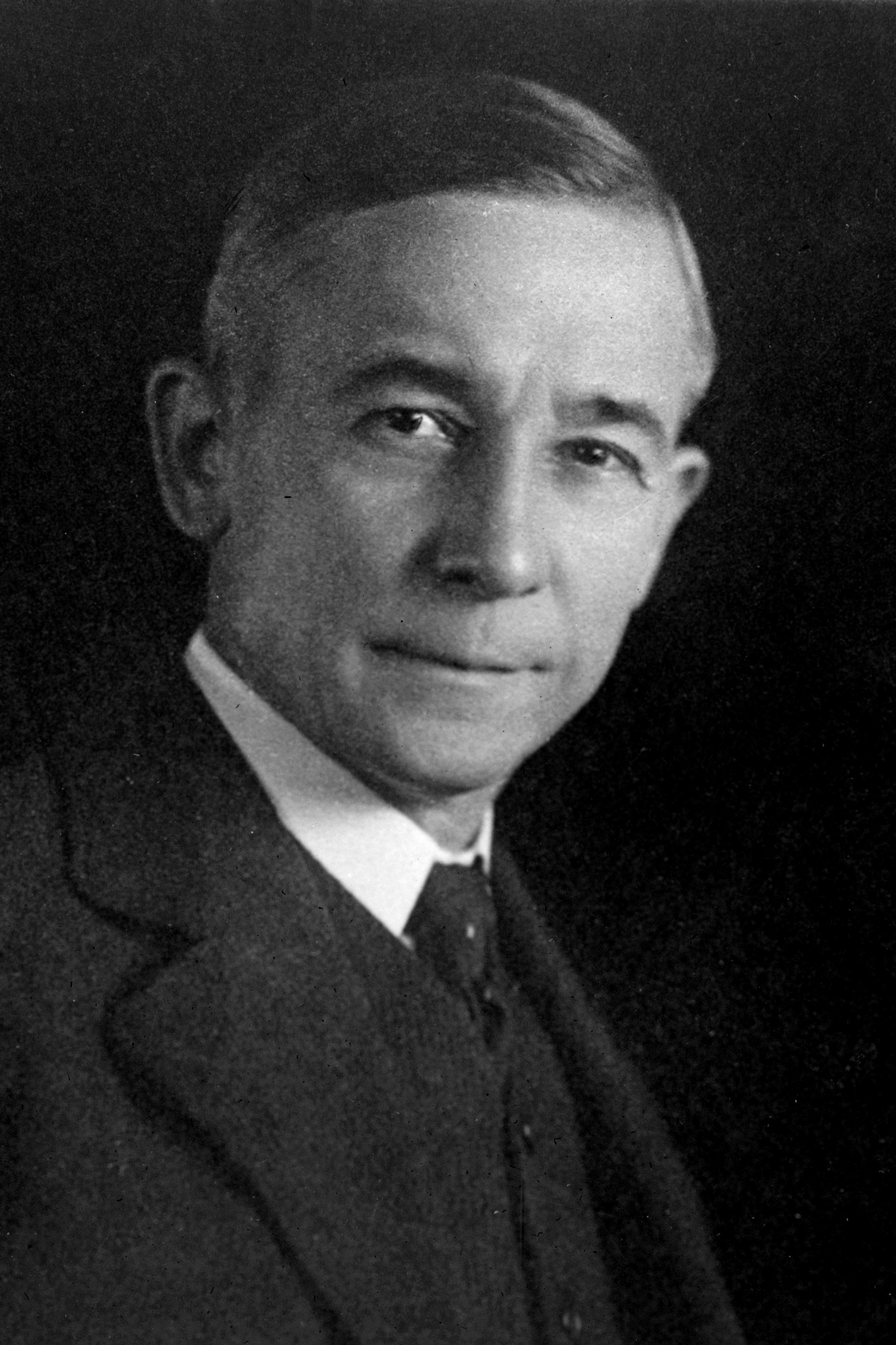
- Stone in 1916

Senior Judge of the United States Court of Appeals for the Eighth Circuit
- In office May 15, 1947 – February 27, 1958

Judge of the United States Court of Appeals for the Eighth Circuit
- In office December 21, 1916 – May 15, 1947
- Appointed by: Woodrow Wilson
- Preceded by: Elmer B. Adams
- Succeeded by: John Caskie Collet

Personal details
- Born: Kimbrough Stone; January 15, 1875 Nevada, Missouri, U.S.
- Died: February 27, 1958 (aged 83)
- Parent: William J. Stone (father)
- Education: University of Missouri (LittB); Harvard Law School read law

Kimbrough Stone (January 15, 1875 – February 27, 1958) was a United States circuit judge of the United States Court of Appeals for the Eighth Circuit.

== Education and career ==
Stone was born on January 15, 1875, in Nevada, Missouri, to Louise and William J. Stone, Stone received a Bachelor of Letters degree from the University of Missouri in 1895 and attended Harvard Law School, though he read law to enter the bar in 1898. He was in private practice in St. Louis, Missouri from 1898 to 1913. He was a Circuit Judge for the 16th Circuit of Missouri from 1913 to 1917.

== Federal judicial service ==
On December 19, 1916, Stone was nominated by President Woodrow Wilson to a seat on the United States Court of Appeals for the Eighth Circuit vacated by Judge Elmer B. Adams. Stone was confirmed by the United States Senate on December 21, 1916, and received his commission the same day. He was a member of the Conference of Senior Circuit Judges (now the Judicial Conference of the United States) from 1927 to 1947. He assumed senior status on May 15, 1947, serving in that capacity until his death on February 27, 1958.

== See also ==
- List of United States federal judges by longevity of service

== Sources ==
Legal offices
Preceded by Elmer B. Adams	Judge of the United States Court of Appeals for the Eighth Circuit; 1916–1947	Succeeded by John Caskie Collet
