= George Moore (Missouri judge) =

American judge

Senior Judge of the United States District Court for the Eastern District of Missouri
- In office January 19, 1962 – November 5, 1962

Chief Judge of the United States District Court for the Eastern District of Missouri
- In office 1948–1959
- Preceded by: Office established
- Succeeded by: Roy Winfield Harper

Judge of the United States District Court for the Eastern District of Missouri
- In office May 29, 1935 – January 19, 1962
- Appointed by: Franklin D. Roosevelt
- Preceded by: Charles Breckenridge Faris
- Succeeded by: James Hargrove Meredith

Personal details
- Born: George H. Moore; January 20, 1878 La Grange, Missouri, U.S.
- Died: November 5, 1962 (aged 84)
- Education: University of Missouri School of Law (LL.B., LL.M.)

George H. Moore (January 20, 1878 – November 5, 1962) was a Missouri attorney and United States district judge of the United States District Court for the Eastern District of Missouri.

== Education and career ==
Born in La Grange, Missouri, Moore received a Bachelor of Laws from the University of Missouri School of Law in 1901 and a Master of Laws from the same institution the following year. He was in private practice in St. Louis, Missouri, from 1902 to 1935, also working as a United States Collector of Internal Revenue from 1914 to 1922.

== Federal judicial service ==
Moore was nominated by President Franklin D. Roosevelt on May 20, 1935, to a seat on the United States District Court for the Eastern District of Missouri vacated by Judge Charles Breckenridge Faris. Moore was confirmed by the United States Senate on May 28, 1935, and received his commission the following day. He served as Chief Judge from 1948 to 1959, and assumed senior status on January 19, 1962. He continued to serve as a senior judge until his death on November 5, 1962.

== Sources ==
Legal offices
| Preceded by Charles Breckenridge Faris | Judge of the United States District Court for the Eastern District of Missouri; 1935–1962 | Succeeded by James Hargrove Meredith |
| Preceded by Office established | Chief Judge of the United States District Court for the Eastern District of Missouri; 1948–1959 | Succeeded by Roy Winfield Harper |
