= James Hargrove Meredith =

American judge

Senior Judge of the United States District Court for the Eastern District of Missouri
- In office August 31, 1979 – December 8, 1988

Chief Judge of the United States District Court for the Eastern District of Missouri
- In office 1971–1979
- Preceded by: Roy Winfield Harper
- Succeeded by: Harris Kenneth Wangelin

Judge of the United States District Court for the Eastern District of Missouri
- In office March 17, 1962 – August 31, 1979
- Appointed by: John F. Kennedy
- Preceded by: George Moore
- Succeeded by: Clyde S. Cahill Jr.

Personal details
- Born: James Hargrove Meredith; August 25, 1914 Wedderburn, Oregon, U.S.
- Died: December 8, 1988 (aged 74) St. Louis, Missouri, U.S.
- Education: University of Missouri (A.B.); University of Missouri School of Law (LL.B.)

James Hargrove Meredith (August 25, 1914 – December 8, 1988) was a United States district judge of the United States District Court for the Eastern District of Missouri.

== Education and career ==
Born in Wedderburn, Oregon, Meredith received an Artium Baccalaureus degree from the University of Missouri in 1936 and a Bachelor of Laws from the University of Missouri School of Law in 1937. He was in private practice in Portageville, Missouri from 1937 to 1938. He was in private practice in New Madrid, Missouri from 1939 to 1941. He was an assistant prosecuting attorney of New Madrid County, Missouri from 1939 to 1941. He was a special agent for the Federal Bureau of Investigation in Los Angeles and San Francisco, California from 1942 to 1944. He was in the United States Navy during World War II, from 1944 to 1946. He was in private practice in Portageville from 1946 to 1949. He was a legal secretary to the Governor of Missouri from 1949 to 1950. He was chief counsel for the State Insurance Department of Missouri from 1950 to 1952. He was in private practice in St. Louis, Missouri from 1952 to 1962. He was in private practice in Washington, D.C. from 1961 to 1962.

== Federal judicial service ==
Meredith was nominated by President John F. Kennedy on March 5, 1962, to a seat on the United States District Court for the Eastern District of Missouri vacated by Judge George Moore. He was confirmed by the United States Senate on March 16, 1962, and received his commission on March 17, 1962. He served as Chief Judge from 1971 to 1979. He assumed senior status on August 31, 1979. Meredith served in that capacity until his death on December 8, 1988, in St. Louis.

== Sources ==
Legal offices
Preceded by George Moore	Judge of the United States District Court for the Eastern District of Missouri; 1962–1979	Succeeded by Clyde S. Cahill Jr.
Preceded by Roy Winfield Harper	Chief Judge of the United States District Court for the Eastern District of Missouri; 1971–1979	Succeeded by Harris Kenneth Wangelin
