= Gustavus Finkelnburg =

American judge (1837–1908)

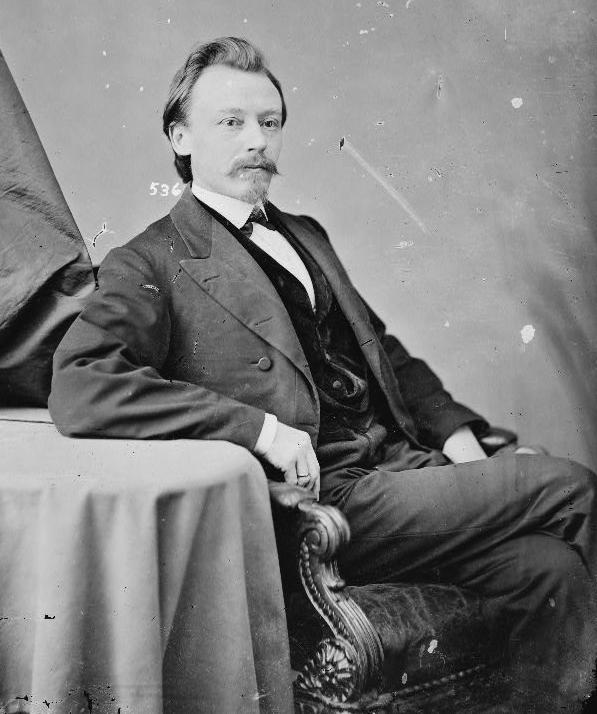

Judge of the United States District Court for the Eastern District of Missouri
- In office May 20, 1905 – March 31, 1907
- Appointed by: Theodore Roosevelt
- Preceded by: Elmer B. Adams
- Succeeded by: David Patterson Dyer

Member of the U.S. House of Representatives from Missouri's 2nd district
- In office March 4, 1869 – March 3, 1873
- Preceded by: Carman A. Newcomb
- Succeeded by: Erastus Wells

Personal details
- Born: Gustav Adolf Finkelnburg; April 6, 1837 Cologne, Kingdom of Prussia
- Died: May 18, 1908 (aged 71) Denver, Colorado, US
- Resting place: Bellefontaine Cemetery; St. Louis, Missouri
- Party: Republican; Liberal Republican
- Education: University of Cincinnati College of Law

Gustavus Adolphus Finkelnburg (born Gustav Adolf Finkelnburg, German pronunciation: [ˈɡʊstaf ˈfɪŋkl̩nbʊʁk]; April 6, 1837 – May 18, 1908) was a United States representative from Missouri and a United States district judge of the United States District Court for the Eastern District of Missouri.

== Education and career ==
Born on April 6, 1837, near Cologne, Prussia, Finkelnburg immigrated to the United States in 1848 with his parents, who settled in St. Charles, Missouri. He attended St. Charles College, then graduated from the Cincinnati Law School (now the University of Cincinnati College of Law) in 1859. He was admitted to the bar and entered private practice in St. Louis, Missouri starting in 1860. He served in the Union Army during the American Civil War. He was a member of the Missouri House of Representatives from 1864 to 1868, serving as Speaker pro tempore in 1868.

== Congressional service ==
Finkelnburg was elected as a Republican from Missouri's 2nd congressional district to the United States House of Representatives of the 41st United States Congress and as a Liberal Republican to the 42nd United States Congress, serving from March 4, 1869 to March 3, 1873.

== Federal judicial service ==
Finkelnburg received a recess appointment from President Theodore Roosevelt on May 20, 1905, to a seat on the United States District Court for the Eastern District of Missouri vacated by Judge Elmer B. Adams. He was nominated to the same position by President Roosevelt on December 5, 1905. He was confirmed by the United States Senate on December 12, 1905, and received his commission the same day. His service terminated on March 31, 1907, due to his resignation.

== Death ==
Finkelnburg died on May 18, 1908, aged 71, in Denver, Colorado. He was interred in Bellefontaine Cemetery in St. Louis.

== Sources ==
- United States Congress. "Gustavus Finkelnburg (id: F000129)". Biographical Directory of the United States Congress.
- Gustavus Adolphus Finkelnburg at the Biographical Directory of Federal Judges, a publication of the Federal Judicial Center.

Party political offices
Preceded by William Gentry	Republican nominee for Governor of Missouri; 1876	Succeeded by David Patterson Dyer
U.S. House of Representatives
Preceded by Carman Newcomb	Member of the U.S. House of Representatives from Missouri's 2nd congressional district 1869–1873	Succeeded by Erastus Wells
Legal offices
Preceded by Elmer B. Adams	Judge of the United States District Court for the Eastern District of Missouri; 1905–1907	Succeeded by David Patterson Dyer
