= Armstrong Teasdale =

American law firm

Armstrong Teasdale LLP
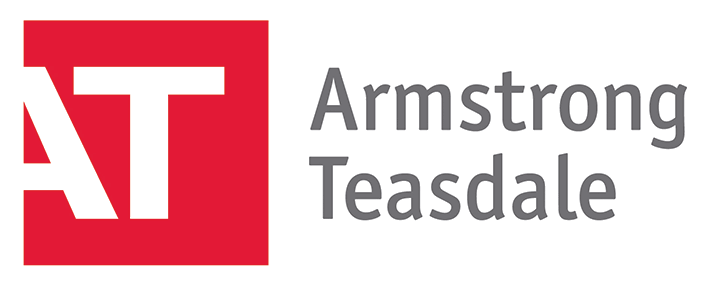
- Headquarters: St. Louis, Missouri
- No. of offices: 17
- No. of attorneys: approximately 400 (2023)
- No. of employees: 800 (including lawyers)
- Major practice areas: General practice
- Key people: Patrick W. Rasche, managing partner David W. Braswell, chairman Michael A. Chivel, chairman emeritus
- Date founded: 1901
- Founder: Thomas Harper Cobbs and John E. Bishop
- Company type: Limited liability partnership
- Website: armstrongteasdale.com

Armstrong Teasdale is a partner-owned law firm headquartered in St. Louis, Missouri. The firm has about 800 employees in 17 offices and is one of the largest law firms in the St. Louis area. It was founded in 1901.

== History ==
Armstrong Teasdale was founded in 1901. In 1989, it merged with Dietrich, Davis, Dicus, Rowlands, Schmitt & Gorman, which became the firm's Kansas City office. In 1995, it created a consulting arm called A-T International Consultants to practice Chinese law out of Shanghai. By 1996, Armstrong Teasdale had 168 lawyers and was the third largest law firm in the St. Louis area. It merged with a D.C. firm, Tighe Patton & Babbin, in 2000. It also later merged with Pellegrini & O'Keefe. The firm established its first east coast office in Philadelphia in 2018. Shortly afterward, Armstrong Teasdale expanded its east coast operations with new offices in Utah, New York, New Jersey, Illinois, and Massachusetts. In 2021, the firm expanded to the Delaware and the United Kingdom by merging with Kerman & Co. In 2022, the firm opened offices in Miami, Washington, D.C., and Dublin, Ireland. In 2023, the firm expanded to Orange County and Chicago.

== Legal work ==
Armstrong Teasdale's legal work has included supporting the financing of the St. Louis Cardinals Stadium and the St. Louis Mills Mall. It also helped Victoria's Secret sue The May Department Stores Company regarding a non-compete agreement that would have prohibited an executive from working at Victoria's Secret. Armstrong Teasdale has also done several high-profile personal injury and product liability cases on both the defense and plaintiff side. In 2017, it helped Johnson & Johnson overturn a $72 million verdict in litigation over talcum powder. In 2019, it represented Payless in its bankruptcy filing. And in 2020, it earned a $386 million contract for biotech intellectual property work for the National Institutes of Health.
