= Gibson, Dunklin County, Missouri =

Unincorporated community in Dunklin County, Missouri

Coordinates: 36.4409°N 90.0306°W

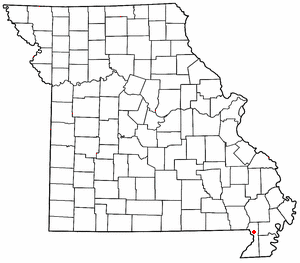

Gibson is an unincorporated community in northern Dunklin County, Missouri, United States. It is located thirteen miles (21 km) north of Kennett on Route 53.

Gibson was originally called Canaan Island; the present name honors the Gibson family, original owners of the site. A post office called Gibson has been in operation since 1892.
