= United States District Court for the Eastern District of Missouri =

United States trial level federal district court based in St. Louis, Missouri

Coordinates: 38°37′44″N 90°11′34″W

- (E.D. Mo.)

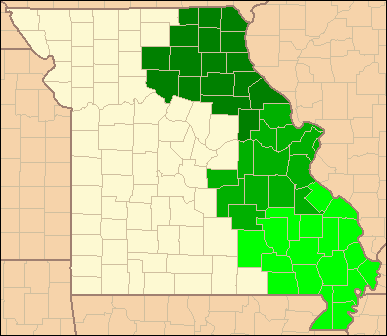
- Location: Thomas F. Eagleton U.S. Courthouse (St. Louis) More locations: Rush Hudson Limbaugh Sr. U.S. Courthouse (Cape Girardeau); Hannibal Federal Building (Hannibal)
- Appeals to: Eighth Circuit
- Established: March 3, 1857
- Judges: 9
- Chief Judge: Stephen R. Clark

Officers of the court
- U.S. Attorney: Thomas C. Albus
- U.S. Marshal: John D. Jordan
- moed.uscourts.gov

The United States District Court for the Eastern District of Missouri (in case citations, E.D. Mo.) is a trial level federal district court based in St. Louis, Missouri, with jurisdiction over fifty counties in the eastern half of Missouri. The court is one of ninety-four district-level courts which make up the first tier of the U.S. federal judicial system. Judges of this court preside over civil and criminal trials on federal matters that originate within the borders of its jurisdiction. It is organized into three divisions, with court held in St. Louis, Hannibal, and Cape Girardeau.

The court was formed when the District of Missouri was divided into East and West in 1857, and its boundaries have changed little since that division. In its history it has heard a number of important cases that made it to the United States Supreme Court, covering issues related to freedom of speech, abortion rights, property rights, and campaign finance law. There are currently nine active judges, five judges in senior status, and seven magistrate judges attached to the court.

As of August 2025, the United States attorney for the Eastern District of Missouri is Thomas C. Albus. He was confirmed by the Senate on December 18, 2025.

== Mandate and jurisdiction ==
As a United States district court, the United States District Court for the Eastern District of Missouri conducts civil trials and issues orders. The cases it hears concern either federal question jurisdiction, where a federal law or treaty is applicable, or diversity jurisdiction, where parties are domiciled in different states. The court also holds criminal trials of persons charged with violations of federal law. Appeals from cases brought in the Eastern District of Missouri are heard by the United States Court of Appeals for the Eighth Circuit (except for patent claims and claims against the U.S. government under the Tucker Act, which are appealed to the Federal Circuit). These cases can then be appealed to the United States Supreme Court.

The Court is based in St. Louis but is organized into three divisions: Eastern, Northern, and Southeastern.

The court for the Eastern division is held in downtown St. Louis, in the Thomas F. Eagleton United States Courthouse, where the St. Louis Clerk's Office is located. It covers the counties of Crawford, Dent, Franklin, Gasconade, Jefferson, Lincoln, Maries, Phelps, Saint Charles, Saint Francois, Saint Louis, Warren, Washington, and the independent City of St. Louis.

The Northern division is based in Hannibal, Missouri, but its office is unstaffed unless court is being held there. It covers the counties of Adair, Audrain, Chariton, Clark, Knox, Lewis, Linn, Macon, Marion, Monroe, Montgomery, Pike, Ralls, Randolph, Schuyler, Shelby, and Scotland.

The Southeastern division is based at Cape Girardeau. Its courthouse is named for Rush Limbaugh Sr. That division's jurisdiction covers Bollinger, Butler, Cape Girardeau, Carter, Dunklin, Iron, Madison, Mississippi, New Madrid, Pemiscot, Perry, Reynolds, Ripley, Sainte Genevieve, Scott, Shannon, Stoddard, and Wayne counties.

== History ==
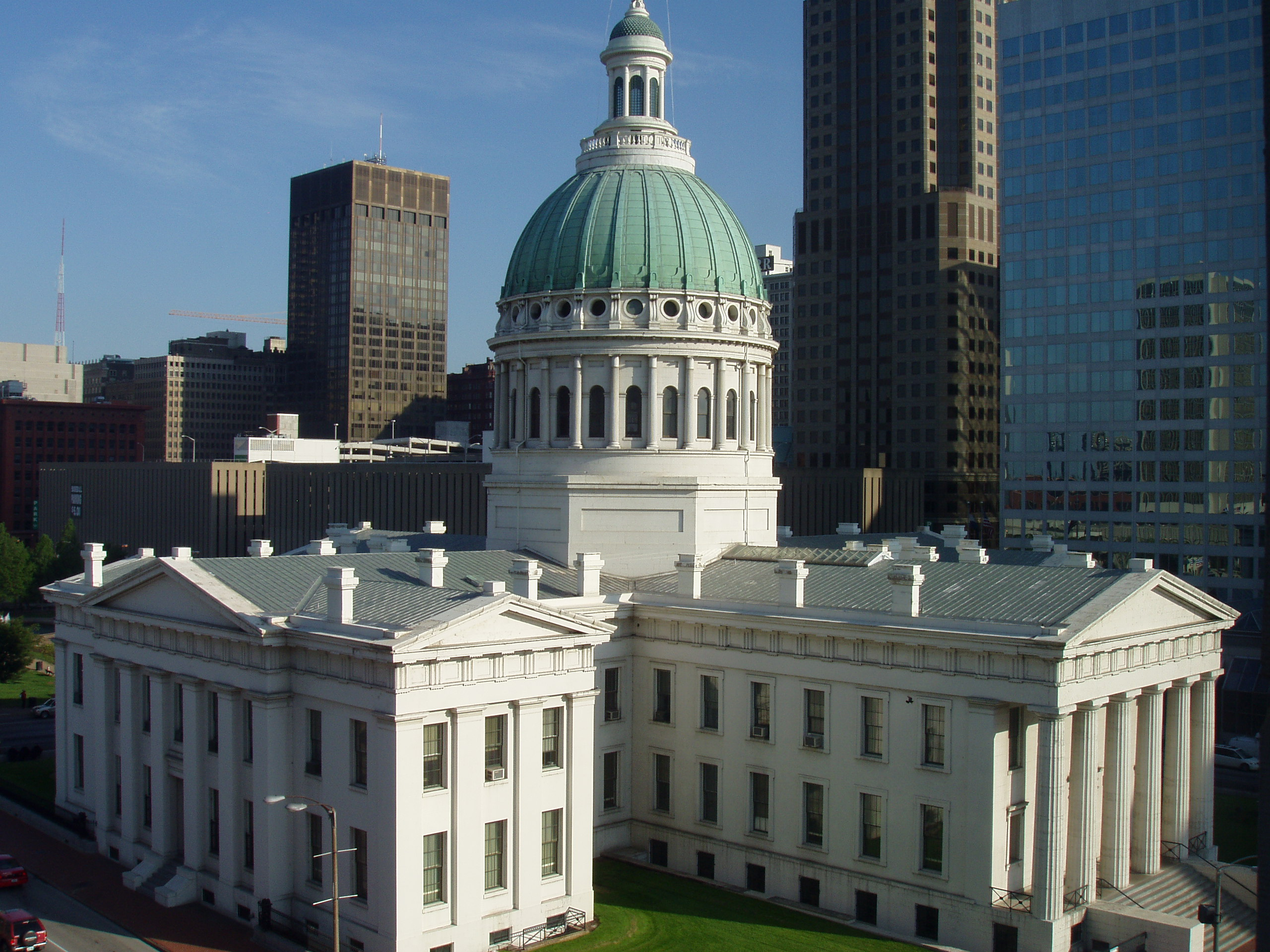
The Old Courthouse of St. Louis, where the court met prior to 1884, as it appears today.

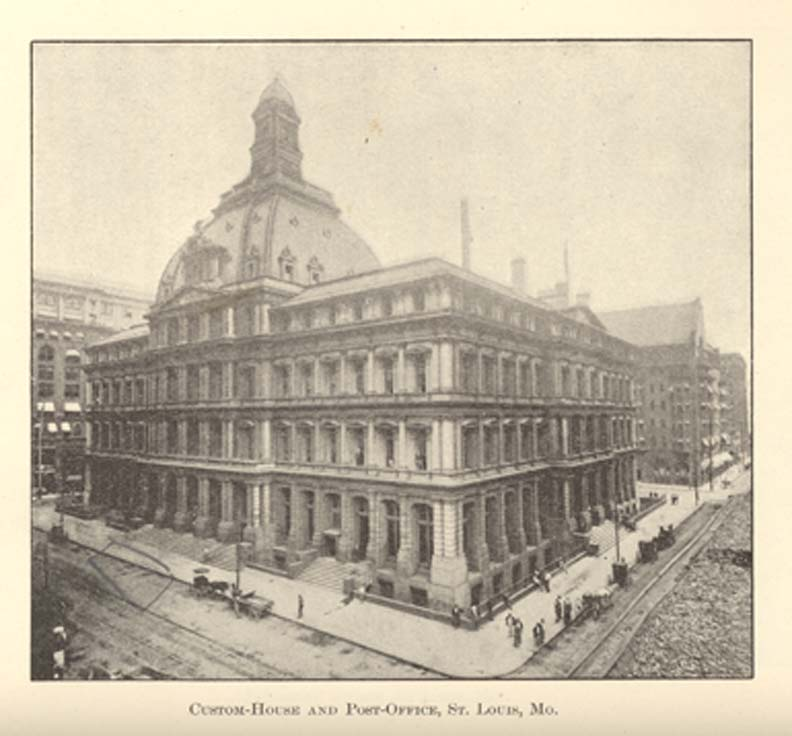
From 1884 to 1935, the court met at the U.S. Custom House and Post Office of St. Louis.

=== Origins ===
Missouri was admitted as a state on August 10, 1821, and the United States Congress established the United States District Court for the District of Missouri on March 16, 1822. The District was assigned to the Eighth Circuit on March 3, 1837. Congress subdivided it into Eastern and Western Districts on March 3, 1857. and has since made only small adjustments to the boundaries of that subdivision. The division was prompted by a substantial increase in the number of admiralty cases arising from traffic on the Mississippi River, which had followed an act of Congress passed in 1845 and upheld by the Supreme Court of the United States in 1851, extending federal admiralty jurisdiction to inland waterways. These disputes involved "contracts of affreightment, collisions, mariners' wages, and other causes of admiralty jurisdiction", and litigants of matters arising in St. Louis found it inconvenient to travel to Jefferson City for their cases to be tried.

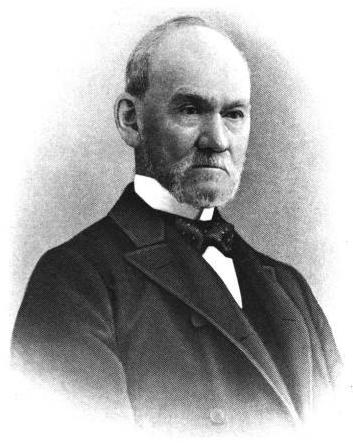
Samuel Treat was the first judge to serve Missouri's Eastern District.

When the District of Missouri was subdivided, Robert William Wells, who was the sole judge serving the District of Missouri at the time of the division, was reassigned to the Western District, allowing President Franklin Pierce to appoint Samuel Treat as the first judge for the Eastern District of Missouri. The court was initially authorized to meet in St. Louis, which had previously been one of the two authorized meeting places of the District Court for the District of Missouri. It met for a time at the landmark courthouse shared with Missouri state courts, which was the tallest building in the state during that period. For the first thirty years of its existence, the court was primarily concerned with admiralty and maritime cases, including maritime insurance claims.

=== Civil War and aftermath ===
Within a few years of the court's establishment, the American Civil War erupted, and Missouri was placed under martial law. Missouri was a border state with sharply divided loyalties among its citizenry, resulting in the imposition of stern controls from the Union government, including the imprisonment of large number of Missouri militiamen. When the District, by the hand of Judge Treat, issued a writ of habeas corpus for the release of one of them, Captain Emmett MacDonald, Union commanding general William S. Harney refused, asserting that he had to answer to a "higher law". A substantial portion of the court's docket in this period came from tax cases:

when the Civil War came it brought in its train a new class of cases, arising from the violation of treasury regulations, and proceedings to enforce the internal revenue law in all its complex and multiplied divisions and subdivisions. When whisky and tobacco, and net income, and gross receipts, and manufactories, and occupations, and legacies, and bonds, and notes, and conveyances, and drugs and medicines, and other innumerable things, were taxed by the Federal government, and each one had a separate code of laws of its own ...

The court, in this time, also tried numerous criminal cases arising from efforts to evade the tax laws through smuggling and fraud. Following the Civil War, and in response to the economic disruption it had caused, Congress enacted the Bankruptcy Act of 1867. Between its enactment and its subsequent repeal in 1878, the Act caused "countless controversies" arising in bankruptcy to be brought before the District Court. Despite the turmoil inflicted by the Civil War, Missouri experienced a population boom, becoming the fifth largest state in the U.S. by 1890, and having a busy court docket which reflected this population growth.

=== Further division and expansion ===
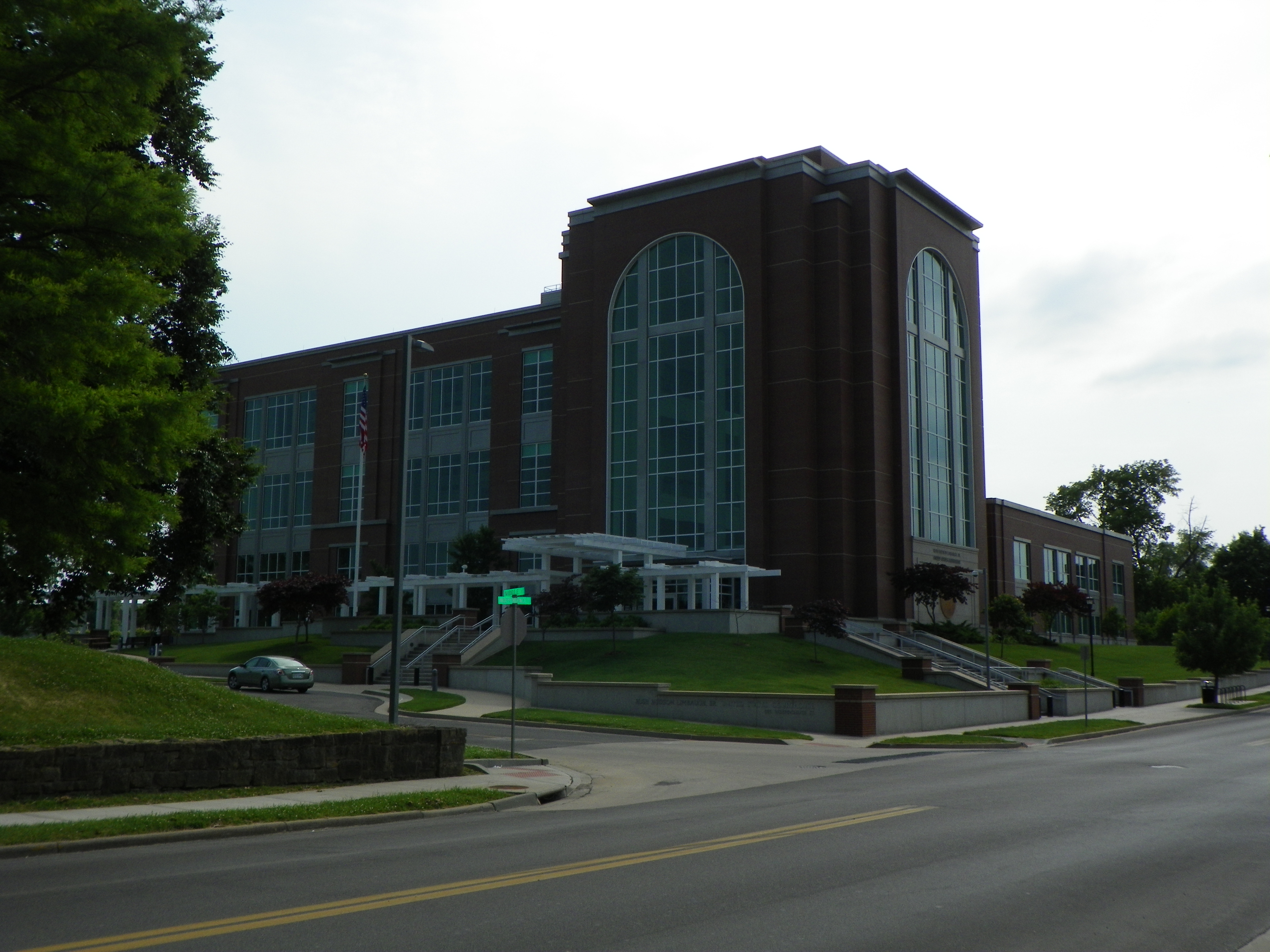
Rush Hudson Limbaugh Sr. Courthouse, Southeastern Division

In 1887 a Congressional Act divided the Eastern District into the Northern and Eastern Divisions of the Eastern District. The courts of the Eastern Division continued to be held at the U.S. Custom House and Post Office in St. Louis, while the courts of the Northern Division were moved to the U.S. Post Office at Hannibal, Missouri, where they met until 1960. These two courts, along with the four courts of the Western District, made six courts for the state, and at the time no other state had so many separate federal courts. The district has since been further divided into the Eastern, Northern, and Southeast divisions.

In 1888, Audrain County, Missouri, was moved from the Eastern to the Western District. In 1897, it was moved back to the Eastern district. In 1891, the United States circuit courts were eliminated in favor of the new United States courts of appeals. When the United States Court of Appeals for the Eighth Circuit heard its first case, on October 12, 1891, the presiding judge Henry Clay Caldwell was joined by two district court judges from within the jurisdiction of the Circuit. One of those was Amos Madden Thayer of the Eastern District of Missouri. Thayer would later be appointed to the Eight Circuit in his own right.

The court was authorized to meet in Cape Girardeau beginning in 1905, and from 1910 to 1920 was additionally authorized to meet in Rolla, Missouri. On September 14, 1922, an additional temporary judgeship was authorized for each district of Missouri, and on August 19, 1935, these temporary judgeships were made permanent. Additional judgeships were added to the Eastern District in 1936, 1942, 1970, 1978, and 1984, and two were added in 1990, bringing the Eastern District to its current total of nine judges.

The court continued to meet at the U.S. Custom House and Post Office until 1935, and then moved to the United States Court House and Custom House in St. Louis. In 2001 it moved to the Thomas F. Eagleton United States Courthouse, the largest courthouse in the United States.

The 2000 census reported that the district had a population of nearly 2.8 million, ranking 38th in population among the 90 U.S. judicial districts.

Jean Constance Hamilton, appointed by George H. W. Bush in 1990, was the first female judge appointed to the District. The first African American to serve was Clyde S. Cahill Jr., who was appointed by Jimmy Carter in 1980. Over the history of the District, five of its judges have been elevated to the Eighth Circuit – Elmer Bragg Adams, John Caskie Collet, Charles Breckenridge Faris, Amos Madden Thayer and William H. Webster.

== Notable cases ==
During the Great Depression, three important United States Supreme Court cases were decided which determined the constitutionality of New Deal measures, one of which originated in the Eastern District of Missouri. The case, originally filed as Norman v. B & O Railroad, reached the Supreme Court along with two cases filed in the United States Court of Claims, under the single heading of the Gold Clause Cases. The Supreme Court upheld the determination of the trial court judge, Charles Breckenridge Faris, who found that Congress had the power to prohibit parties from contracting for payment in gold.

In 1976, the court heard the original proceedings in Planned Parenthood of Central Missouri v. Danforth, a case that challenged several Missouri state regulations regarding abortion. The case was eventually appealed to the United States Supreme Court, which reaffirmed the right to abortion and struck down certain restrictions as unconstitutional.

Due to a school desegregation suit in 1972, the court required St. Louis to accept a busing plan in 1980. Judge William L. Hungate declared that a mandatory plan would go into effect unless other arrangements were made to adhere to the terms of the suit. In 1983, an unprecedented voluntary busing plan was put into place, integrating the schools without a mandated plan being required.

In Hazelwood v. Kuhlmeier, a case that started in Missouri's Eastern District went before the United States Supreme Court in 1988, it was held that public school curricular student newspapers are subject to a lower level of First Amendment protection. Another First Amendment case in public schools came up in 1998, when E.D. Mo. heard Beussink v. Woodland R-IV School District. Judge Rodney W. Sippel ruled that the school violated a student's rights by sanctioning him for material he posted on his website. This case has been widely cited in higher courts.

In the 2000s, two more notable cases originated in this District and were heard by the United States Supreme Court. Nixon v. Shrink Missouri Government PAC upheld state limits on campaign contributions to state offices, and Sell v. United States imposed stringent limits on the right of a lower court to order the forcible administration of antipsychotic medication to a criminal defendant who had been determined to be incompetent to stand trial for the sole purpose of making him competent and able to be tried. Several notable antitrust cases originated in this district including Brown Shoe Co. v. United States (preventing a merger between two shoe wholesalers which would have reduced competition in the region), and United Shoe Machinery Corp. v. United States (prohibiting certain long-term leases of manufacturing equipment). Another important case brought in the district, Ruckelshaus v. Monsanto Co., involved the right of companies to maintain trade secrets under Missouri law in the face of federal regulations requiring disclosure of pesticide components.

On October 20, 2022, Hans Niemann filed a lawsuit in this district against Magnus Carlsen, his company Play Magnus Group, Chess.com, Daniel Rensch, and Hikaru Nakamura claiming he had been subject to defamation and unlawful collusion by being accused of cheating.

== Current judges ==
As of September 24, 2025:

#	Title	Judge	Duty station	Born	Term of service			Appointed by
#	Title	Judge	Duty station	Born	Active	Chief	Senior	Appointed by
41	Chief Judge	Stephen R. Clark	St. Louis	1966	2019–present	2022–present	—	Trump
35	District Judge	Henry Autrey	St. Louis	1952	2002–present	—	—	G.W. Bush
39	District Judge	Brian C. Wimes (Note: Jointly appointed to the Eastern and Western Districts of Missouri)	none (Note: Judge Wimes maintains chambers only in the Western District.)	1966	2012–present	—	—	Obama
42	District Judge	Sarah Pitlyk	St. Louis	1977	2019–present	—	—	Trump
43	District Judge	Matthew T. Schelp	St. Louis	1970	2020–present	—	—	Trump
44	District Judge	Cristian Stevens	St. Louis	1973	2025–present	—	—	Trump
45	District Judge	Zack Bluestone	St. Louis	1986	2025–present (Note: By virtue of his seniority of age, Judge Bluestone holds seniority over Judge Divine despite their identical commission dates.)	—	—	Trump
46	District Judge	Josh Divine	St. Louis	1990	2025–present	—	—	Trump
47	District Judge	Maria Lanahan	St. Louis	1987	2025–present	—	—	Trump
21	Senior Judge	Edward Louis Filippine	inactive	1930	1977–1995	1990–1995	1995–present	Carter
27	Senior Judge	Jean Constance Hamilton	inactive	1945	1990–2013	1995–2002	2013–present	G.H.W. Bush
31	Senior Judge	Catherine D. Perry	St. Louis	1952	1994–2018	2009–2016	2018–present	Clinton
32	Senior Judge	E. Richard Webber	inactive	1942	1995–2009	—	2009–present	Clinton
33	Senior Judge	Nanette Kay Laughrey	none (Note: Judge Laughrey maintains chambers only in the Western District.)	1946	1996–2011	—	2011–present	Clinton
34	Senior Judge	Rodney W. Sippel	St. Louis	1956	1997–2023	2016–2022	2023–present	Clinton
36	Senior Judge	Stephen N. Limbaugh Jr.	Cape Girardeau	1952	2008–2020	—	2020–present	G.W. Bush
37	Senior Judge	Audrey G. Fleissig	St. Louis	1955	2010–2023	—	2023–present	Obama
38	Senior Judge	John Andrew Ross	St. Louis	1954	2011–2023	—	2023–present	Obama

== Former judges ==
#	Judge	Born–died	Active service	Chief Judge	Senior status	Appointed by	Reason for termination
1	Samuel Treat	1815–1902	1857–1887	—	—	Pierce	retirement
2	Amos Madden Thayer	1841–1905	1887–1894	—	—	Cleveland	elevation
3	Henry Samuel Priest	1853–1930	1894–1895	—	—	Cleveland	resignation
4	Elmer Bragg Adams	1842–1916	1895–1905 (Note: Recess appointment; formally nominated on December 4, 1895, confirmed by the United States Senate on December 9, 1895, and received commission the same day.)	—	—	Cleveland	elevation
5	Gustavus A. Finkelnburg	1837–1908	1905–1907 (Note: Recess appointment; formally nominated on December 5, 1905, confirmed by the Senate on December 12, 1905, and received commission the same day.)	—	—	T. Roosevelt	resignation
6	David Patterson Dyer	1838–1924	1907–1919	—	1919–1924	T. Roosevelt	death
7	Charles Breckenridge Faris	1864–1938	1919–1935	—	—	Wilson	elevation
8	Charles B. Davis	1877–1943	1924–1943	—	—	Coolidge	death
9	George Moore	1878–1962	1935–1962	1948–1959	1962	F. Roosevelt	death
10	John Caskie Collet	1898–1955	1937–1947 (Note: Jointly appointed to the Eastern and Western Districts of Missouri.)	—	—	F. Roosevelt	elevation
11	Richard M. Duncan	1889–1974	1943–1965	—	1965–1974	F. Roosevelt	death
12	Rubey Mosley Hulen	1894–1956	1943–1956	—	—	F. Roosevelt	death
13	Roy Winfield Harper	1905–1994	1947 (Note: Recess appointment; not confirmed by the Senate. Jointly appointed to the Eastern and Western Districts of Missouri.); 1947–1948 (Note: Received a second recess appointment and was again rejected by the Senate. Jointly appointed to the Eastern and Western Districts of Missouri.); 1948–1971 (Note: Received a third recess appointment; formally nominated on January 13, 1949, confirmed by the Senate on January 31, 1949, and received commission on February 2, 1949. Jointly appointed to the Eastern and Western Districts of Missouri.)	1959–1971	1971–1994	Truman; Truman; Truman	not confirmed not confirmed death
14	Randolph Henry Weber	1909–1961	1957–1961	—	—	Eisenhower	death
15	James Hargrove Meredith	1914–1988	1962–1979	1971–1979	1979–1988	Kennedy	death
16	John Keating Regan	1911–1987	1962–1977	—	1977–1987	Kennedy	death
17	William Robert Collinson	1912–1995	1965–1980	—	1980–1995	L. Johnson	death
18	William H. Webster	1924–2025	1970–1973	—	—	Nixon	elevation
19	Harris Kenneth Wangelin	1913–1987	1970–1983	1979–1983	1983–1987	Nixon	death
20	John Francis Nangle	1922–2008	1973–1990	1983–1990	1990–2008	Nixon	death
22	William L. Hungate	1922–2007	1979–1991	—	1991–1992	Carter	retirement
23	Clyde S. Cahill Jr.	1923–2004	1980–1992	—	1992–2004	Carter	death
24	Joseph Edward Stevens Jr.	1928–1998	1981–1995	—	1995–1998	Reagan	death
25	Stephen N. Limbaugh Sr.	1927–present	1983–1996	—	1996–2008	Reagan	retirement
26	George F. Gunn Jr.	1927–1998	1985–1996	—	1996–1998	Reagan	death
28	Donald J. Stohr	1934–2015	1992–2006	—	2006–2015	G.H.W. Bush	death
29	Carol E. Jackson	1952–present	1992–2017	2002–2009	—	G.H.W. Bush	retirement
30	Charles Alexander Shaw	1944–2020	1993–2009	—	2009–2020	Clinton	death
40	Ronnie L. White	1953–present	2014–2024	—	—	Obama	retirement

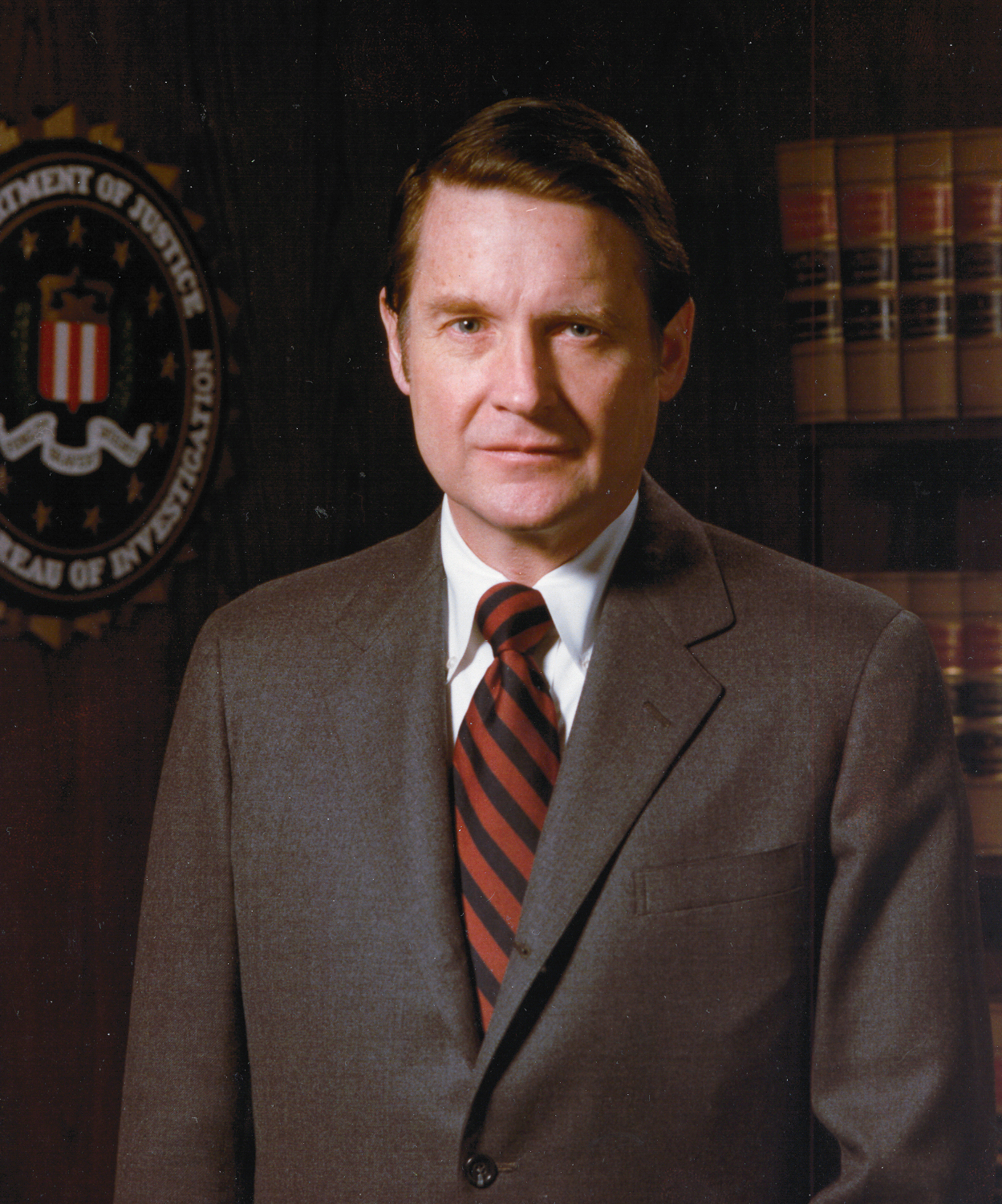
William H. Webster was the District Court's most recent judge to be elevated to the Eighth Circuit

== Chief judges ==
Chief judges have administrative responsibilities with respect to their district court. Unlike the Supreme Court, where one justice is specifically nominated to be chief, the office of chief judge rotates among the district court judges. To be chief, a judge must have been in active service on the court for at least one year, be under the age of 65, and have not previously served as chief judge.

A vacancy is filled by the judge highest in seniority among the group of qualified judges. The chief judge serves for a term of seven years, or until age 70, whichever occurs first. The age restrictions are waived if no members of the court would otherwise be qualified for the position.

When the office was created in 1948, the chief judge was the longest-serving judge who had not elected to retire, on what has since 1958 been known as senior status, or declined to serve as chief judge. After August 6, 1959, judges could not become or remain chief after turning 70 years old. The current rules have been in operation since October 1, 1982.

== Succession of seats ==
Seat 1
Seat established on March 3, 1857 by 11 Stat. 197
Treat	1857–1887
Thayer	1887–1894
Priest	1894–1895
Adams	1895–1905
Finkelnburg	1905–1907
Dyer	1907–1919
Faris	1919–1935
Moore	1935–1962
Meredith	1962–1979
Cahill Jr.	1980–1992
Perry	1994–2018
Pitlyk	2019–present

Seat 2
Seat established on September 14, 1922 by 42 Stat. 838 (temporary)
Seat made permanent on August 19, 1935 by 49 Stat. 659
Davis	1924–1943
Hulen	1943–1956
Weber	1957–1961
Regan	1962–1977
Filippine	1977–1995
Webber Jr.	1995–2009
Fleissig	2010–2023
Stevens	2025–present

Seat 3
Seat established on June 22, 1936 by 49 Stat. 1804 (concurrent with Western District)
Collet	1937–1947
Harper	1947–1971
Wangelin	1970–1983
Limbaugh Sr.	1983–1996
Sippel	1997–2023
Divine	2025–present

Seat 4
Seat established on December 24, 1942 by 56 Stat. 1083 (temporary, concurrent with Western District)
Seat made permanent on February 10, 1954 by 68 Stat. 8
Duncan	1943–1965
Collinson	1965–1980
Stevens Jr.	1981–1995
Laughrey	1996–2011
Wimes	2012–present

Seat 5
Seat established on June 2, 1970 by 84 Stat. 294
Webster	1970–1973
Nangle	1973–1990
Hamilton	1990–2013
White	2014–2024
Lanahan	2025–present

Seat 6
Seat established on October 20, 1978 by 92 Stat. 1629
Hungate	1979–1991
Jackson	1992–2017
Clark	2019–present

Seat 7
Seat established on July 10, 1984 by 98 Stat. 333
Gunn Jr.	1985–1996
Autrey	2002–present

Seat 8
Seat established on December 1, 1990 by 104 Stat. 5089
Stohr	1992–2006
Limbaugh Jr.	2008–2020
Schelp	2020–present

Seat 9
Seat established on December 1, 1990 by 104 Stat. 5089 (temporary)
Shaw	1993–2009
Ross	2011–2023
Seat made permanent on December 23, 2024 by 138 Stat. 2693
Bluestone	2025–present

== United States attorneys ==
List of U.S. attorneys since 1857

- Calvin F. Burns (1857–1861)
- Asa S. Jones (1861–1862)
- William W. Edwards (1862–1863)
- William N. Grover (1863)
- John Willock Noble (1867–1870)
- Chester H. Krum (1870–1876)
- William H. Bliss (1876–1887)
- Thomas P. Bashaw (1887–1889)
- George D. Reynolds (1889–1894)
- William H. Clopton (1894–1898)
- Edward A. Rozier (1898–1902)
- David Patterson Dyer (1902–1907)
- Henry W. Blodgett (1907–1910)
- Charles A. Houts (1910–1914)
- Arthur L. Oliver (1914–1919)
- Walter Lewis Hensley (1919–1920)
- James E. Carroll (1920–1923)
- Allen Curry (1923–1926)
- Louis H. Breuer (1926–1934)
- Harry C. Blanton (1934–1947)
- Drake Watson (1947–1951)
- George L. Robertson (1951–1953)
- William W. Crowdis (1953)
- Harry Richards (1953–1959)
- William H. Webster (1959–1961)
- D. Jeff Lance (1961–1962)
- Richard D. Fitzgibbon Jr. (1962–1967)
- Veryl Riddle (1967–1969)
- James E. Reeves (1969)
- Daniel Bartlett Jr. (1969)
- James E. Reeves (1969–1973)
- Donald J. Stohr (1973–1976)
- Barry A. Short (1976–1977)
- Robert D. Kingsland (1977–1981)
- Thomas E. Dittmeier (1981–1990)
- Stephen B. Higgins (1990–1993)
- Edward L. Dowd Jr. (1993–1999)
- Michael W. Reap (1999–2000)
- Audrey G. Fleissig (2000–2001)
- Raymond Gruender (2001–2004)
- James Martin (2004–2005)
- Catherine Hanaway (2005–2009)
- Michael W. Reap (2009–2010)
- Richard G. Callahan (2010–2017)
- Caroline A. Costantin (2017)
- Jeffrey Jensen (2017–2020)
- Sayler A. Fleming (2020–2025)
- Matthew Drake (acting) (2025)
- Thomas Albus (2025-Present)

== See also ==
- Courts of Missouri
- List of current United States district judges
- List of United States federal courthouses in Missouri
