= Catherine D. Perry =

American judge (born 1952)

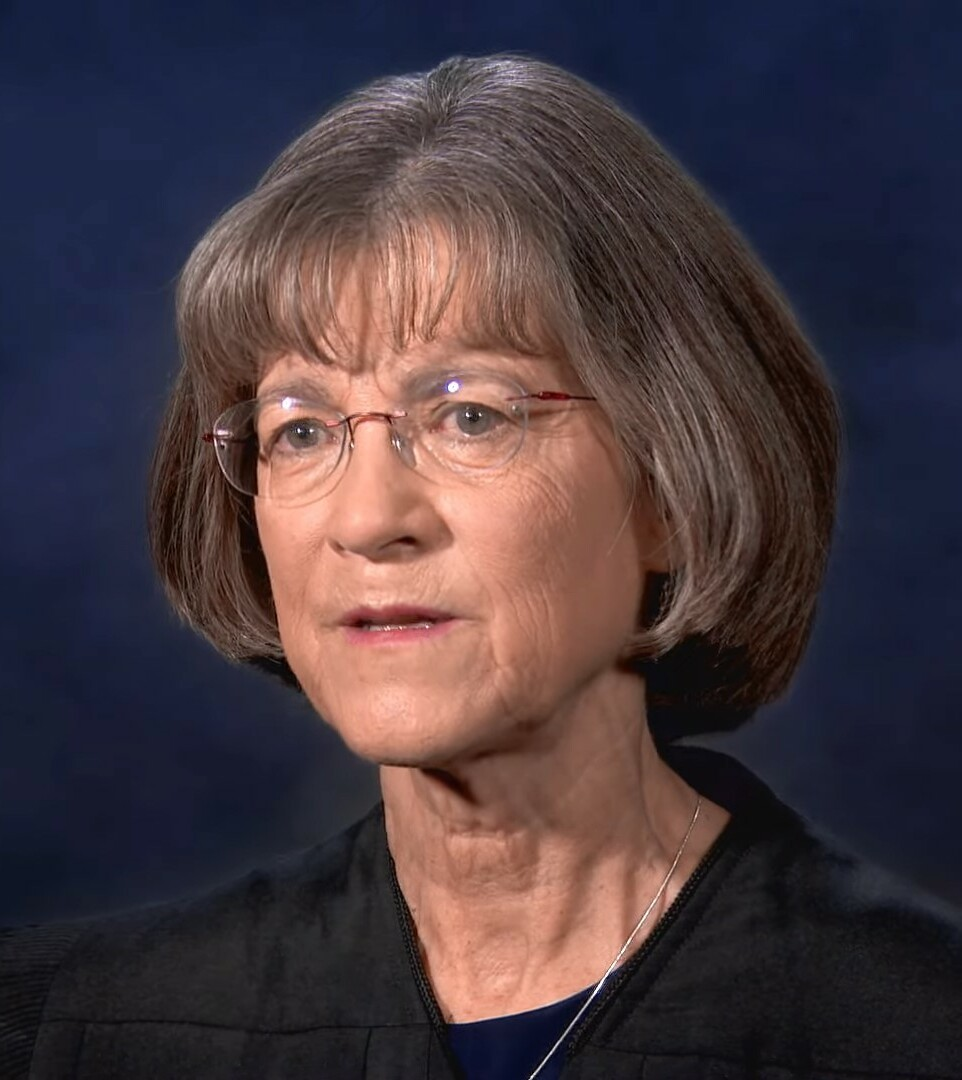
- Perry in 2021

Senior Judge of the United States District Court for the Eastern District of Missouri
- Incumbent
- Assumed office December 31, 2018

Chief Judge of the United States District Court for the Eastern District of Missouri
- In office 2009 – January 3, 2016
- Preceded by: Carol E. Jackson
- Succeeded by: Rodney W. Sippel

Judge of the United States District Court for the Eastern District of Missouri
- In office October 7, 1994 – December 31, 2018
- Appointed by: Bill Clinton
- Preceded by: Clyde S. Cahill Jr.
- Succeeded by: Sarah Pitlyk

Magistrate Judge of the United States District Court for the Eastern District of Missouri
- In office 1990–1994

Personal details
- Born: September 6, 1952 (age 73) Hobart, Oklahoma, U.S.
- Education: University of Oklahoma (BA); Washington University in St. Louis (JD)

Catherine Delores Perry (born September 6, 1952) is a senior United States district judge of the United States District Court for the Eastern District of Missouri.

== Education and career ==
Born in Hobart, Oklahoma, Perry received a Bachelor of Arts degree from University of Oklahoma in 1977, and a Juris Doctor from Washington University in St. Louis in 1980. After graduation she became an adjunct professor of law at Washington University School of Law and taught there intermittently from 1981 to 1994. She also served as a United States magistrate judge of the United States District Court for the Eastern District of Missouri from 1990 to 1994.

=== Federal judicial service ===
On July 15, 1994, Perry was nominated by President Bill Clinton to a seat on the United States District Court for the Eastern District of Missouri vacated by Judge Clyde S. Cahill. She was confirmed by the United States Senate on October 6, 1994, and received her commission the following day. She served as chief judge from 2009 to 2016. Perry assumed senior status on December 31, 2018.

==== Notable ruling ====
On August 18, 2014 Perry denied motions by the ACLU for temporary restraining orders against six police officers to prevent the enforcement of a 5-second rule in Ferguson, Missouri. Perry cited the need for law enforcement's protection of property and the availability of a "free-speech zone". However, at the time of this ruling the free speech zone was off-limits to the public.

== Sources ==
Legal offices
| Preceded by Clyde S. Cahill Jr. | Judge of the United States District Court for the Eastern District of Missouri; 1994–2018 | Succeeded by Sarah Pitlyk |
| Preceded by Carol E. Jackson | Chief Judge of the United States District Court for the Eastern District of Missouri; 2009–2016 | Succeeded by Rodney W. Sippel |
