= Raymond Gruender =

American judge (born 1963)

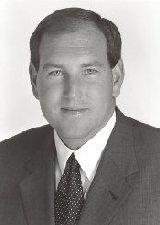

Judge of the United States Court of Appeals for the Eighth Circuit
- Incumbent
- Assumed office June 5, 2004
- Appointed by: George W. Bush
- Preceded by: Pasco Bowman II

United States Attorney for the Eastern District of Missouri
- In office October 2001 – June 2004
- President: George W. Bush
- Preceded by: Audrey G. Fleissig
- Succeeded by: James Martin

Personal details
- Born: Raymond William Gruender; 1963 (age 62–63) St. Louis, Missouri, U.S.
- Party: Republican
- Spouse: Kimberly Martinez (m. 2023)
- Education: Washington University (BA, MBA, JD)

Raymond William Gruender (born 1963) is a United States circuit judge of the United States Court of Appeals for the Eighth Circuit.

== Personal life and early career ==
Gruender was born in St. Louis, Missouri. He graduated from the prestigious Jesuit, all-boy College-preparatory school, St. Louis University High School, in 1981. He then attended Washington University in St. Louis and Washington University School of Law and earned three degrees: a Bachelor of Arts, a Juris Doctor, and a Master of Business Administration. In 2006, he received the Distinguished Young Alumni Award from the law school. He has been married to Kimberly Martinez since June 16, 2023.

Prior to joining the federal bench, Gruender worked as an attorney both in private practice and public service. After law school, he was in private practice at Lewis, Rice & Fingersh from 1987 to 1990, at which point he became an Assistant United States Attorney for the Eastern District of Missouri. In 1994, he ran for election as St. Louis County Prosecuting Attorney and lost to the incumbent. He then returned to private practice at Thompson Coburn. In 1996, he was the Missouri state campaign director for Bob Dole's presidential campaign. In 2000, he left Thompson Coburn to rejoin the United States Attorneys' Office, and in 2001 he became the United States Attorney for the Eastern District of Missouri, a position he remained in until his confirmation to the Eighth Circuit in 2004.

== Federal judicial service ==
Gruender was nominated to the Eighth Circuit by President George W. Bush on September 29, 2003, to fill a seat vacated by Judge Pasco Bowman II. The United States Senate confirmed him 97-1 on May 20, 2004, almost eight months later, with Senator Tom Harkin voting against him. Gruender received his commission on June 5, 2004.

== Jurisprudence ==
- Gruender authored the Eighth Circuit's opinion in In Re Union Pacific Railroad Employment Practices Litigation, No. 06-1706, which concluded that the Pregnancy Discrimination Act of 1978 did not give female employees the right to insurance coverage for contraceptives used solely to prevent pregnancy. This opinion has been cited in the context of the debate over the Patient Protection and Affordable Care Act contraception mandate.
- In Planned Parenthood Minnesota, North Dakota, South Dakota v. Rounds, No. 05-3093, a panel of the Eighth Circuit upheld an injunction that struck down a South Dakota informed consent law that required abortion providers to inform patients, among other things, that an "abortion will terminate the life of a whole, separate, unique, living human being." Gruender dissented, arguing that the law was constitutional and did not unduly burden women seeking abortions or infringe on the freedom of speech of physicians. The Eighth Circuit heard the case en banc and ruled in 2008 by a vote of 7–4, in an opinion authored by Gruender, that the law was, on its face, constitutional.
- In Little Rock School District v. North Little Rock School District, No. 04-2923 (2006), Gruender opposed the opinion of a panel of the Eighth Circuit that affirmed the district court's conclusion that federal desegregation monitoring should remain in effect in Little Rock, Arkansas. After the desegregation effort of the Little Rock Nine in 1957, the federal government began monitoring the school district in 1965. The Eighth Circuit agreed with the district court that the Little Rock district did not successfully evaluate its academic programs for how well they helped black students. Gruender dissented, arguing that the district court abused its discretion in mandating federal monitoring by using "impossibly subjective" criteria. The district court subsequently agreed with Gruender's reasoning and freed the school district from federal desegregation monitoring. In 2009, the Eighth Circuit then upheld the district court's decision in another appeal, No. 07-1866.

== Possible Supreme Court nomination ==
Gruender has been consistently mentioned as a possible nominee for the Supreme Court in a Republican administration. On May 18, 2016, then Republican presidential candidate Donald Trump announced that Gruender was on his list of potential Supreme Court nominees.

== See also ==
- Donald Trump Supreme Court candidates

Legal offices
Preceded by Audrey G. Fleissig	United States Attorney for the Eastern District of Missouri; 2001–2004	Succeeded by James Martin
Preceded by Pasco Bowman II	Judge of the United States Court of Appeals for the Eighth Circuit; 2004–present	Incumbent
