= Robin Ransom =

American judge (born 1967)

Justice of the Missouri Supreme Court
- Incumbent
- Assumed office May 24, 2021
- Appointed by: Mike Parson
- Preceded by: Laura Denvir Stith

Personal details
- Born: July 21, 1967 (age 59) St. Louis, Missouri, U.S.
- Education: Rutgers University, New Brunswick (BA); University of Missouri (JD)

Robin Ransom (formerly Robin Ransom Vannoy; born July 21, 1967) is an American lawyer who serves as a judge of the Supreme Court of Missouri. She was appointed to the court in 2021 by Governor Mike Parson, and is the first African-American woman to hold the position. Prior to her appointment to the Supreme Court, Ransom served on the Missouri Court of Appeals for the Eastern District from 2019 to 2021 and served on the St. Louis Circuit Court from 2008 to 2019.

== Early life and education ==
Robin Ransom was born on July 21, 1967, in St. Louis, Missouri. Her father was a firefighter and social worker. She graduated from Rosati-Kain High School and Rutgers University–New Brunswick's Douglass Residential College with a Bachelor of Arts in political science and sociology in 1988, and graduated from the University of Missouri School of Law with a Juris Doctor in 1991.

== Career ==
Ransom began her legal career as a public defender in St. Louis County in 1992. She became a prosecutor in St. Louis County in 1995 and in 2002 was appointed as a juvenile family court commissioner in St. Louis. Also in 2002, she was appointed as an associate justice by Governor Bob Holden. She was appointed to the St. Louis Circuit Court on September 11, 2008, by Governor Matt Blunt. Ransom's peers on the court unanimously elected her to serve as presiding judge in 2018, succeeding Michael Mullen; she was the first African-American woman to hold this position.

In 2019, she was appointed by Governor Mike Parson to serve on the Missouri Court of Appeals for the Eastern District. Parson appointed her to the Supreme Court of Missouri on May 24, 2021; Ransom is the first African-American woman to serve on the court's bench. She was one of 25 applicants for the position, and was selected from a field of three candidates put forward by a nonpartisan commission, as per the Missouri Plan. After receiving the list of three candidates, Parson decided on Ransom within one day, though he had up to 60 days to finalize a decision. State Representative Ashley Bland Manlove, the chair of the Missouri Legislative Black Caucus, said the group was pleased by Ransom's appointment but thought "the fact that it took two centuries to happen highlights the continued need to address inequities in all aspects of Missouri's judicial system". Former Missouri Chief Justice Michael A. Wolff praised Ransom’s selection.

== Personal life ==
Ransom bowls competitively, having bowled since the age of 11; in March 2021, she bowled a perfect 300. She tutors children for a local church's literacy program. She is a member of the Juvenile Officer Performance Standards Work Group and the Missouri State Foster Care and Adoption Board, as well as a mentor of the nonprofit The Literacy Project.

== See also ==
- List of African-American jurists
- List of African-American U.S. state firsts
- List of judges of the Supreme Court of Missouri

Legal offices
Preceded by Laura Denvir Stith	Justice of the Missouri Supreme Court; 2021–present	Incumbent
