= List of first minority male lawyers and judges in Missouri =

This is a list of the first minority male lawyer(s) and judge(s) in Missouri. It includes the year in which the men were admitted to practice law (in parentheses). Also included are men who achieved other distinctions such becoming the first in their state to graduate from law school or become a political figure.

== Firsts in Missouri's history ==
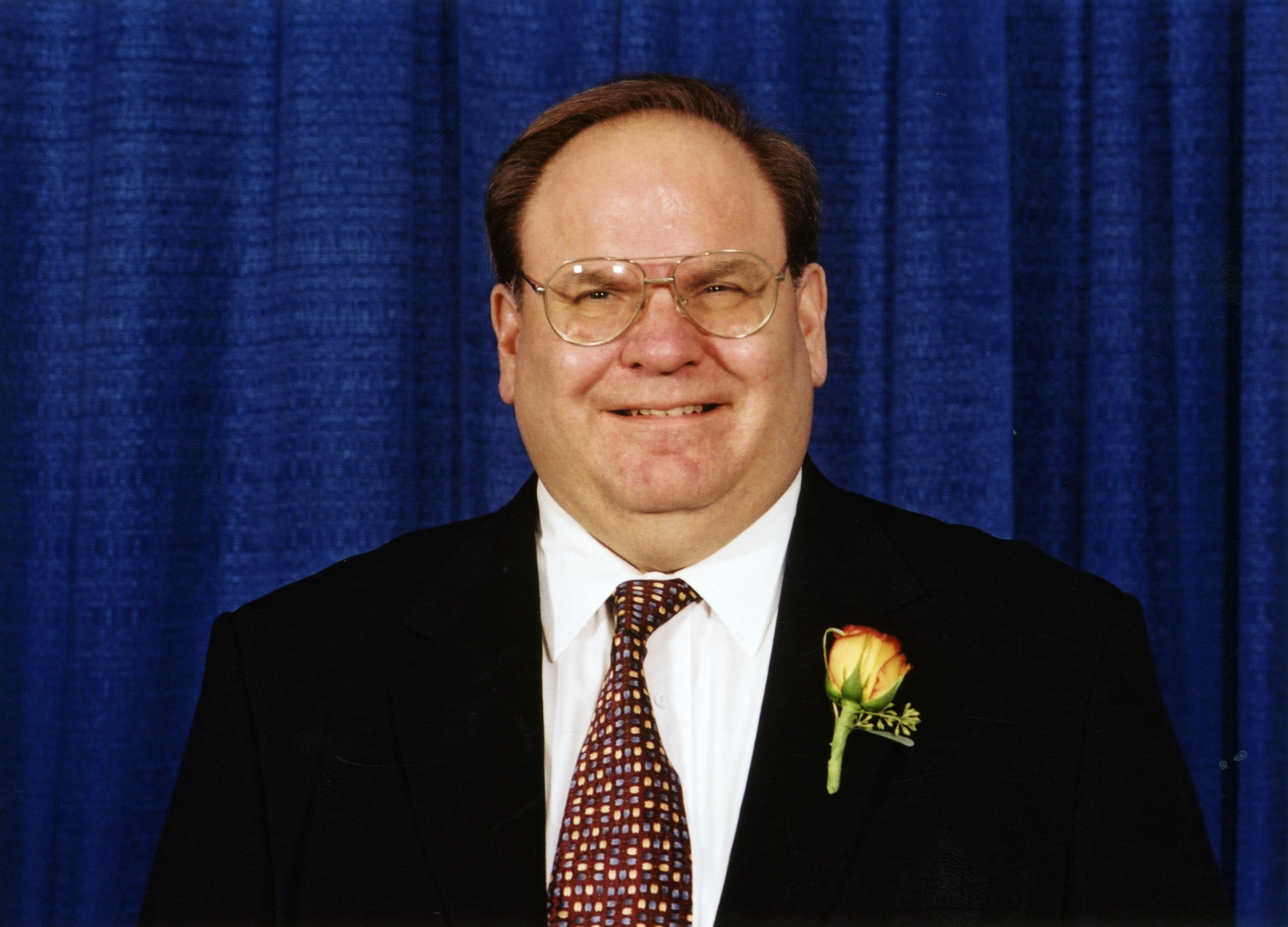
Richard B. Teitelman: First blind and Jewish male to serve on the Missouri Supreme Court (2002)

=== Lawyers ===
- First African American male: John H. Johnson (1871)
- First African American male to argue a case before the Missouri Supreme Court: Walter M. Farmer (1889) in 1893
- First African American male lawyer from Missouri to be admitted to the American Bar Association: Scovel Richardson (c. 1953)
- First deaf male: James "Jamie" Frost (1999)

=== State judges ===
- First African American male: Walter M. Farmer (1889) during the 1890s
- First African American male (elected): Crittenden Clark in 1922
- First African American male (Missouri Court of Appeals): Theodore McMillian (1949) in 1972
- First African American male (Missouri Supreme Court): Ronnie L. White (1983) in 1995
- First openly gay male: Lawrence E. Mooney:
- First blind/Jewish male (Missouri Supreme Court): Richard B. Teitelman (1973) in 2002
- First African American male (Missouri Supreme Court; Chief Justice): Ronnie L. White (1983) in 2003
- First quadriplegic male: Jason Sengheiser in 2017

=== Federal judges ===
- First African American male (U.S. Court of Appeals for the Eighth Circuit): Theodore McMillian (1949) in 1978
- First African American male (U.S. District Court for the Eastern District of Missouri): Clyde S. Cahill Jr. (1951) in 1980

=== Missouri Bar Association ===
- First African American male president: Charlie J. Harris, Jr.

== Firsts in local history ==
- John H. Kelly: First African American male lawyer in Buchanan County and St. Joseph Counties, Missouri
- I. J. Ringolsky: First Jewish male to serve as the President of the Kansas City Bar Association (1940) [Cass, Clay, Jackson and Platte Counties, Missouri]
- Charles Boles: First African American male to serve as justice of the peace in Boonville, Cooper County, Missouri (1890)
- Fernando J. Gaitan Jr.: First African American male corporate lawyer in Kansas City, Jackson County, Missouri (upon working for Southwestern Bell Telephone Company)
- Filiberto (Filbert) Muñoz: First Latino American male lawyer in Kansas City, Jackson County, Missouri
- Lewis W. Clymer: First African American male to serve as a Judge of the Jackson County Circuit Court (1970)
- Victor Rocha: First Mexican American male judge in Kansas City, Jackson County, Missouri (1984)
- Homer G. Phillips: First African American male lawyer in Pettis County, Missouri
- Noah W. Parden (c. 1890): First African American male lawyer in St. Clair County, Missouri
- Eleazer Block (1814): First Jewish male lawyer in the independent city of St. Louis, Missouri (1817)
- Crittenden Clark: First African American male to serve as the Justice of the Peace for St. Louis, Missouri (1922)
- William Sherwood Diuguid: First African American male magistrate in St. Louis, Missouri
- Scovel Richardson: Scovel Richardson: First African American male lawyer admitted to the St. Louis Bar Association (1953)

== See also ==
- List of first minority male lawyers and judges in the United States

== Other topics of interest ==
- List of first women lawyers and judges in the United States
- List of first women lawyers and judges in Missouri
