= Paul C. Wilson =

American judge (born 1961)

Paul Wilson

Chief Justice of the Missouri Supreme Court
- In office June 30, 2021 – June 30, 2023
- Preceded by: George W. Draper III
- Succeeded by: Mary Russell

Justice of the Missouri Supreme Court
- Incumbent
- Assumed office December 3, 2012
- Appointed by: Jay Nixon
- Preceded by: William Ray Price Jr.

Personal details
- Born: May 23, 1961 (age 63); Jefferson City, Missouri, U.S.
- Education: Drury University (BA); University of Missouri (JD)

Paul C. Wilson (born May 23, 1961) is an American lawyer who has served as a judge of the Missouri Supreme Court. He was appointed in 2012, and was formerly a circuit judge in the 19th Judicial Circuit.

== Education ==
Wilson received a Bachelor of Arts degree in theatre from Drury University in 1982 and his Juris Doctor, cum laude, from the University of Missouri School of Law in 1992. Received an Honorary Doctorate in Law from Drury University in 2022.

== Legal career ==
He served as a law clerk to Justice Edward D. Robertson Jr. of the Missouri Supreme Court from 1992 to 1993 and then Judge Richard Fred Suhrheinrich of the United States Court of Appeals for the Sixth Circuit from 1993 to 1994. From 1994 to 1996, he was an associate with Sullivan & Cromwell. From 1996 to 2008, he served as an assistant attorney general, and then as a deputy chief of staff litigation. From 2009 to 2010, he served as a senior counselor for budget and finance and as director for the Transform Missouri Initiative. He sat as a Judge of the 19th Judicial Circuit Court in Cole County from January 2010–March 2011. From 2011 to 2012, he was a member of the Columbia law firm Van Matre, Harrison, Hollis, Taylor and Bacon.

On December 3, 2012, Governor Jay Nixon announced his appointment of Wilson to the Missouri Supreme Court. He served as chief justice from June 30, 2021 to June 30, 2023.

== Personal life ==
He is married to Laura O’Kelley Wilson and they have two daughters Meredith and Alice. Judge Wilson's father, McCormick Wilson, served as a Cole County Associate Circuit Judge for many years and his mother, Lorna Wilson, served as Director of the Cole County Health Department and the State Division of Maternal, Family and Child Health.

Legal offices
Preceded by William Ray Price Jr.	Justice of the Missouri Supreme Court; 2012–present	Incumbent
Preceded by George W. Draper III	Chief Justice of the Missouri Supreme Court; 2021–2023	Succeeded by Mary Russell
