= Richard B. Teitelman =

American judge (1947–2016)

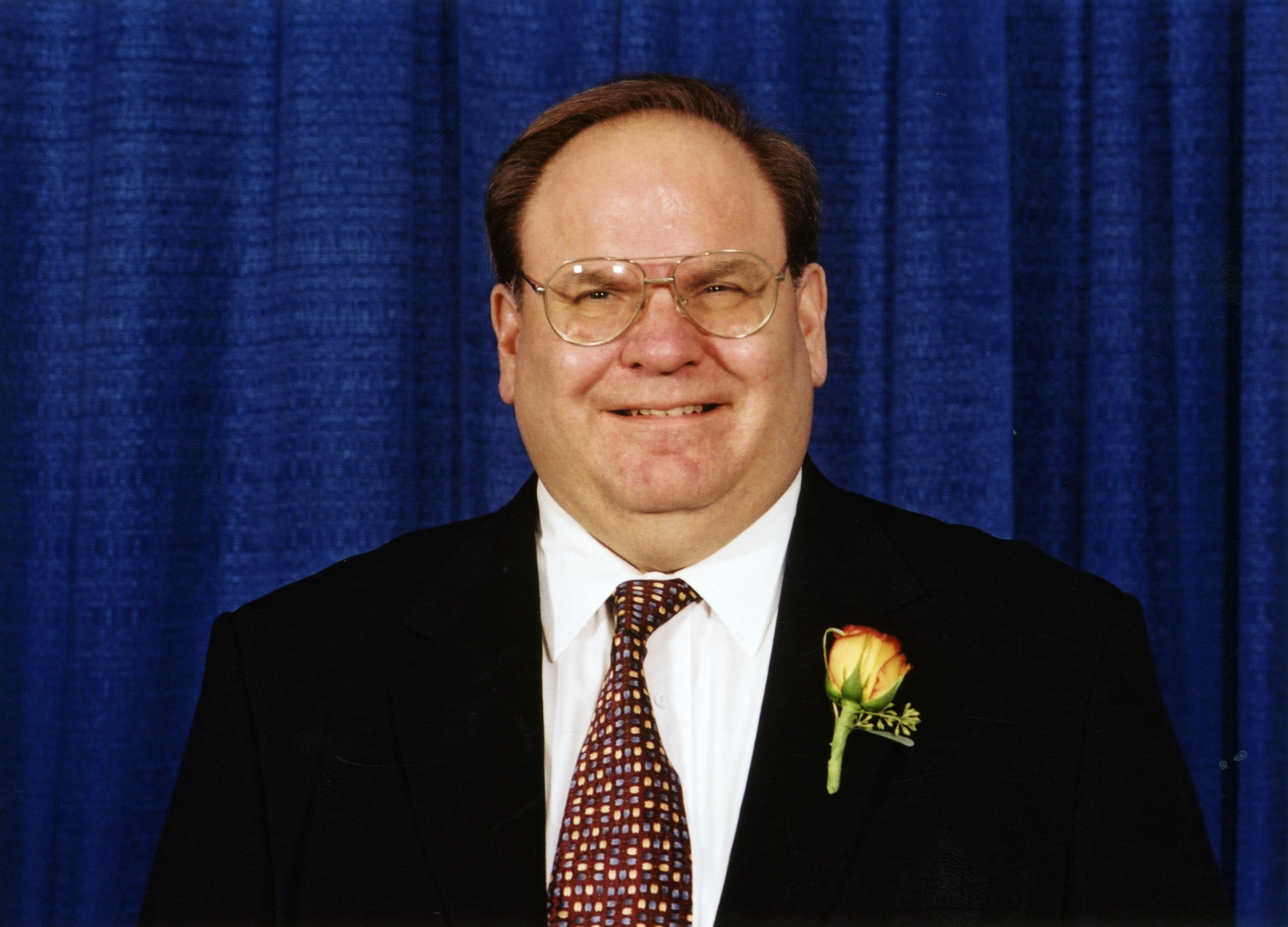

Chief Justice of Missouri
- In office July 1, 2011 – June 30, 2013
- Preceded by: William Ray Price Jr.
- Succeeded by: Mary Rhodes Russell

Judge of the Supreme Court of Missouri
- In office February 21, 2002 – November 29, 2016
- Appointed by: Bob Holden
- Preceded by: John C. Holstein
- Succeeded by: W. Brent Powell

Personal details
- Born: September 25, 1947 Philadelphia, Pennsylvania, U.S.
- Died: November 29, 2016 (aged 69) St. Louis, Missouri, U.S.
- Education: University of Pennsylvania; Washington University School of Law

Richard Bertram Teitelman (September 25, 1947 – November 29, 2016) was a judge and chief justice of the Supreme Court of Missouri.

Teitelman was born in Philadelphia in 1947, and was the youngest of three children. At age 13, he was diagnosed as being legally blind. He earned his undergraduate degree from the University of Pennsylvania in 1969. Moving to Missouri, he earned his law degree from Washington University in St. Louis in 1973. Following a brief stint in private practice, he worked at Legal Services of Eastern Missouri for 23 years, including 18 years as executive director and general counsel. He was also President of the Bar Association of Metropolitan St. Louis. In 1998, he was appointed to the Missouri Court of Appeals by Governor Mel Carnahan, serving in that capacity until his appointment to the state Supreme Court by Governor Bob Holden in 2002. He was both the first Jewish and the first legally blind judge to serve on Missouri's highest court.

Teitelman's ascension to the court marked a shift in the court's balance from majority Republican-appointees since the mid-1980s. The court split along these lines in 2003, when the 4-3 liberal majority held that execution of juveniles is cruel and unusual punishment under the Missouri Constitution, a decision ultimately affirmed by the United States Supreme Court in Roper v. Simmons. In 2003, Teitelman wrote the majority opinion for a divided Supreme Court overturning a murder conviction where the only evidence was the testimony of three eyewitnesses—fellow prisoners at the time—that had all recanted. Although Teitelman agreed that the convicted man had exhausted all of his appeals, he reasoned that clear and convincing evidence of innocence acts as a "gateway" for further review.

Teitelman faced a significant retention challenge in 2004. Missouri attorneys supported his retention by an 80% margin. The ad hoc "Missourians Against Liberal Judges" started what the St. Louis Post-Dispatch editorial page called a "smear campaign" against him. Teitelman won retention in 2004 and 2016.

Teitelman died on November 29, 2016, just over a month before his final term on the court was scheduled to expire on December 31, 2016. His seat on the court was filled in April 2017 with the appointment of Judge W. Brent Powell.

== See also ==
- List of first minority male lawyers and judges in Missouri
- List of Jewish American jurists

Legal offices
| Preceded by John C. Holstein | Associate Judge of the Supreme Court of Missouri; 2002–2016 | Succeeded by W. Brent Powell |
| Preceded by William Ray Price Jr. | Chief Justice of the Supreme Court of Missouri; 2011–2013 | Succeeded by Mary Rhodes Russell |
