= Twinette Johnson =

American lawyer and academic administrator

Dean of the Saint Louis University School of Law
- Incumbent
- Assumed office July 1, 2024
- Preceded by: William P. Johnson

Personal details
- Education: Saint Louis University; Tulane University

Twinette L. Johnson is an American law professor and academic administrator serving as the dean of the Saint Louis University School of Law since July 1, 2024. She was previously the dean of the David A. Clarke School of Law.

== Life ==
Johnson earned a B.A. in English literature (1996) and Ph.D. in public policy (2019) from Saint Louis University. She earned a J.D. from the Tulane University Law School in 1999. She clerked for Missouri Supreme Court judge Duane Benton. Her dissertation was titled Winds of Change, Windows of Opportunity, and Promises of Choice: A Study of New Orleans Post-Hurricane Katrina Charter School Reform and its Effect on Post-Secondary Matriculation Among Orleans Parish Residents.

Johnson was an associate attorney with Shearman & Sterling where she represented financial institutions and corporations. She served as an associate professor of legal writing at the Saint Louis University School of Law for eight years. From August 2011 to July 2017, Johnson was an associate professor of law and director of the academic success program at Southern Illinois University School of Law. Johnson joined the David A. Clarke School of Law in 2017 as a professor of law and director of the academic success program. She was selected as the acting dean on August 1, 2022, succeeding Renée M. Hutchins. On July 3, 2023, she formally assumed the role. On July 1, 2024, she became the dean of the Saint Louis University School of Law.

== Selected works ==
- Johnson, Twinette L.; Goldsmith, Marcia A. (2019). Advanced Legal Analysis and Strategies for Bar Preparation. Aspen Publishing. ISBN 978-1-4548-9976-1.
