= Laura Denvir Stith =

American judge (born 1953)

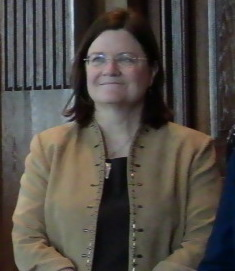
- Stith in 2011

Chief Justice of Missouri
- In office July 1, 2007 – June 30, 2009
- Preceded by: Michael A. Wolff
- Succeeded by: William Ray Price Jr.

Judge of the Supreme Court of Missouri
- In office March 7, 2001 – March 8, 2021
- Appointed by: Bob Holden
- Preceded by: Ann K. Covington
- Succeeded by: Robin Ransom

Personal details
- Born: October 30, 1953 (age 72) St. Louis, Missouri, U.S.
- Spouse: Donald G. Scott
- Relatives: Kate Stith (sister)
- Education: Tufts University; Georgetown University Law Center

Laura Denvir Stith (born October 30, 1953) is a former judge of the Supreme Court of Missouri. She served from 2001 to 2021. She was elected by her fellow Supreme Court justices to serve a two-year term as Chief Justice, from July 1, 2007, to June 30, 2009, becoming the second woman to serve as Missouri's highest-ranking jurist.

Stith graduated in 1971 from John Burroughs School, a private school in metro St. Louis, Missouri. Four years later, she graduated magna cum laude from Jackson College for Women (now part of Tufts University), and then from Georgetown University Law Center in 1978. Stith served as a law clerk for Chief Justice Robert Seiler of the Missouri Supreme Court and then entered private practice in Kansas City, Missouri. She served on the Missouri Court of Appeals, Western District, from 1994 to 2000. On March 7, 2001, then-Governor Bob Holden appointed her to the Supreme Court of Missouri, and she was retained by a vote of the people at the November 2002 election. On February 2, 2021, she announced her retirement effective March 8, 2021.

Stith is a founding director for Lawyers Encouraging Academic Performance ("LEAP") in Kansas City, where she lives with her attorney husband, Donald Scott, and their three children. Her late father, Richard T. Stith, Jr. (October 31, 1919 – February 10, 2013), an insurance agent and financial planner, served as mayor of Clayton, Missouri, a suburb of St. Louis, from 1983 to 1987. He was a decorated Marine pilot during World War II. Her late mother, Ann Carter Stith (November 21, 1920 – November 24, 2005), was a longtime advocate of clean government, prison reform, and educational and family support services for children. Stith's brother Richard T. Stith III is a law professor at Valparaiso University in Indiana. Her sister Kate Stith is a law professor at Yale University, and the wife of Judge José A. Cabranes of the Second Circuit Court of Appeals. Her other sister, Rebecca Stith, is an attorney with the Equal Employment Opportunity Commission.

Legal offices
Preceded by Ann K. Covington	Associate Justice of the Supreme Court of Missouri; 2001–2021	Succeeded by Robin Ransom
Preceded by Michael A. Wolff	Chief Justice of the Supreme Court of Missouri; 2007–2009	Succeeded by William Ray Price, Jr.
