= Connie Wible Murray =

American politician

Member of the Missouri House of Representatives from the 135th district
- In office January 9, 1991 – January 8, 1997
- Preceded by: Jean Dixon
- Succeeded by: Roy Holand

Personal details
- Born: October 13, 1943 (age 82) Tulsa, Oklahoma
- Party: Republican
- Spouse: Jarret Murray

Connie Wible Murray (born October 13, 1943) is an American politician.

== Education ==
In 1965, Murray received a Certificate of Oral Hygiene from Temple University. In 1975, Murray earned a BA degree in English literature from Loyola College. In 1980, Murray earned a Jurius Doctorate degree from the University of Maryland School of Law.

== Career ==
Murray served in the Missouri House of Representatives from the 135th district from 1991 to 1997.

== Awards ==
- 1992 Administration of Justice Award.
- 1994 Judicial Conference Legislative Award.

== Personal life ==
On May 4, 1995, Murray married Jarret Holland Murray, an insurance businessman, at the House chambers in Jefferson City, Missouri. Murray's ceremony was conducted by Missouri Supreme Court Chief Justice Ann K. Covington. In the 1990s, Murray resided in Springfield, Missouri.
