= Pat Wolff =

American pediatrician

- Born: Patricia B. Wolff
- Occupation: Pediatrician
- Known for: Meds & Food for Kids
- Spouse: Michael A. Wolff

Patricia B. Wolff is a St. Louis pediatrician who worked to combat childhood malnutrition in Haiti. She is a Professor Emerita of Clinical Pediatrics at Washington University in St. Louis. In 2004 she founded a nonprofit organization called Meds & Food for Kids.

== Education ==
She attended the University of Minnesota Medical School and earned a BA and a Medical Degree. After graduation she worked for the Indian Health Service attending to the needs of Native Americans in South Dakota.

== Career ==
In 2003 Wolff founded the nonprofit organization Meds and Food for Kids. In 2011 she left her job as a pediatrician to devote herself full-time to Meds and Food for Kids, which manufactures a Ready to Use Therapeutic food in Cap Haitien, Haiti to combat childhood malnutrition. From 2003–2007 her organization distributed a peanut-based nutritional supplement in Haiti which they called Medika Mamba (Haitian Creole for "Peanut Butter Medicine"). Malnourished children who received the supplement saw improvement to their skin, hair, growth and energy. The World Health Organization (WHO) began using Medika Mamba in their missions. Wolff did not accept a salary for her work running Meds & Food for Kids.

=== Awards ===
- The Purpose Prize in 2013
- The Daily Point of Light in 2014
- The Ethical Humanist of the Year in 2014 from the St. Louis Ethical Society
- The 2022 Global Service Leadership award from the Boeing Institute

== Personal life ==
She is married to Michael A. Wolff, former Chief Justice of Missouri. She is a Professor Emerita of Clinical Pediatrics at Washington University School of Medicine.
