= Grand rounds =

Method in medical education and inpatient care

Grand rounds are a methodology of medical education and inpatient care, consisting of presenting the medical problems and treatment of a particular patient to an audience consisting of doctors, residents, and medical students. It was first conceived by clinicians as a way for junior colleagues to round on patients. The patient was traditionally present for the round and would answer questions; grand rounds have evolved with most sessions rarely having a patient present and being more like lectures. An actor portrays the patient in some instances.

Originally a patient-centered experience aimed at increasing clinician knowledge for treating unique cases, today Grand Rounds is more commonly used to educate students, showcase faculty role models, and promote collegiality in clinical settings

— Shana Stites and Christina Warholic, Chestnut Hill College

Grand rounds help doctors and other healthcare professionals keep up to date in important evolving areas which may be outside of their core practice. Most departments at major teaching hospitals will have their own specialized, often weekly, grand rounds. Attending grand rounds is also an important supplement to medical school and on-the-job resident training. Grand rounds can also be distinguished from rounds which is the (typically) daily visit by the attending physician and team to all that physician's patients on the ward. Rounding with an attending physician is an important part of medical on-the-job training and education, but its primary focus is immediate care for the patients on the ward. Grand rounds tends to present the bigger picture, including experience with patients over many years, and the newest research and treatments in an area. Grand rounds tend to be open to the entire medical professional community, whereas rounds are specific to individual attending physicians and their teams.

A 1966 report in the Australian journal Clinical Pediatrics called into question the sometimes inconsiderate behavior of practitioners who treated patients who were featured cases of grand rounds.

== Video archives ==
Many teaching and research hospitals provide streaming video of their grand rounds presentations for free over the Internet. This is an opportunity for medical professionals and students to improve their knowledge, and builds on one of the values of the Hippocratic Oath – that medical education should be provided for free, and that doctors should actively share their knowledge without compensation in order to improve patient care.

Many of these organizations provide an archive of several years of recent grand rounds presentations and as such offer a resource for increasing medical knowledge and improving patient care.

== Footnotes ==
=== Works cited ===
- Stites, Shana D.; Warholic, Christina L. (2014). "Multicultural Grand Rounds: Competency-Based Training Model for Clinical Psychology Graduate Students". Psychology Learning & Teaching. 13 (3): 261–269. doi:10.2304/plat.2014.13.3.261. S2CID 147487820.
