= Duane Benton =

American judge (born 1950)

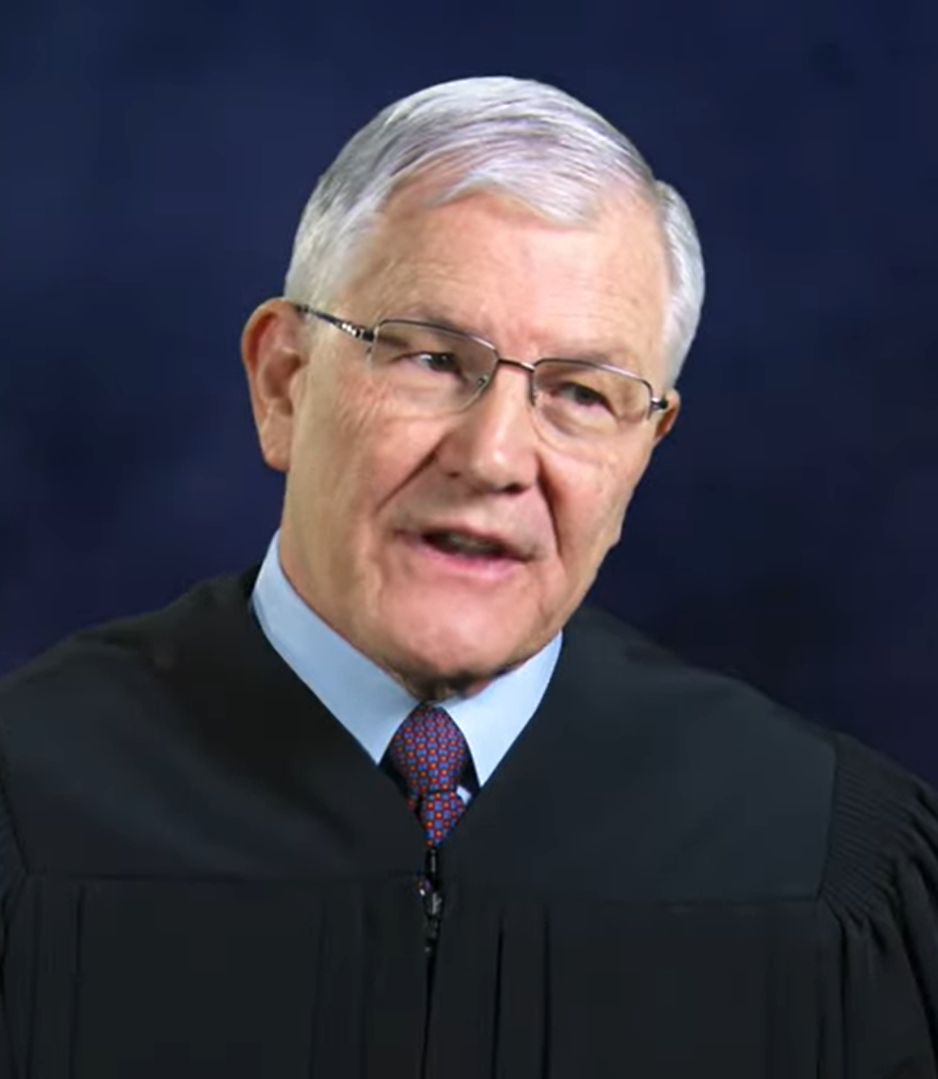

Senior Judge of the United States Court of Appeals for the Eighth Circuit
- Incumbent
- Assumed office June 21, 2026

Judge of the United States Court of Appeals for the Eighth Circuit
- In office July 2, 2004 – June 21, 2026
- Appointed by: George W. Bush
- Preceded by: Theodore McMillian
- Succeeded by: Justin D. Smith

Chief Justice of the Missouri Supreme Court
- In office July 1, 1997 – June 30, 1999
- Preceded by: John C. Holstein
- Succeeded by: William Ray Price Jr.

Justice of the Missouri Supreme Court
- In office August 16, 1991 – July 2, 2004
- Appointed by: John Ashcroft
- Preceded by: William Howard Billings
- Succeeded by: Mary Rhodes Russell

Personal details
- Born: William Duane Benton; September 8, 1950 (age 76) Springfield, Missouri, U.S.
- Relations: Megan Benton (daughter)
- Education: Northwestern University (BA); Yale University (JD); Memphis State University (MBA); University of Virginia (LLM)

William Duane Benton (born September 8, 1950), known professionally as Duane Benton, is a senior United States circuit judge of the United States Court of Appeals for the Eighth Circuit.

== Education ==
Benton graduated from Northwestern University with a Bachelor of Arts degree in 1972, and received a Juris Doctor from Yale Law School in 1975, where he was Managing Editor of the Yale Law Journal and graduated alongside future U.S. Supreme Court Justice Samuel Alito. Benton also has a Master of Business Administration from Memphis State University and a Master of Laws from the University of Virginia School of Law. Subsequently, Benton was selected as a Danforth Fellow at Harvard's John F. Kennedy School of Government, where he completed the Senior Executive's Program.

== Career ==
Benton served as a captain in the U.S. Navy/Naval Reserve from 1972 to 2002, and as judge advocate in the U.S. Navy from 1975 to 1979. Benton has taught at the University of Missouri School of Law, and at Westminster College in Fulton. He served as an administrative aide to Congressman Wendell Bailey from 1981 to 1982. From 1983 to 1989, Benton practiced law in Jefferson City. Benton was Director of the Missouri Department of Revenue in the administration of Missouri Governor John Ashcroft from 1989 to 1991. Prior to joining the federal bench, Benton served as Associate Justice on the Missouri Supreme Court from 1991 to 2004 and was Chief Justice from 1997 to 1999.

== Federal judicial service ==
Benton was nominated by President George W. Bush on February 12, 2004, to a seat vacated by Theodore McMillian and confirmed just over four months later by the United States Senate by a voice vote on June 24, 2004. He received his commission on July 2, 2004.

In 2018, Judge Benton found that Missouri's requirement of a state license to braid hair did not violate the U.S. Constitution.

In October 2025, Benton announced that he would be taking senior status. He assumed senior status on June 21, 2026.

== Personal life ==
Benton currently resides in Kansas City, Missouri, with his wife Sandra and has two children. His daughter Megan Benton has been a judge on the United States District Court for the Western District of Missouri since 2026.

Legal offices
Preceded by William Howard Billings	Justice of the Missouri Supreme Court; 1991–2004	Succeeded by Mary Rhodes Russell
Preceded by John C. Holstein	Chief Justice of the Missouri Supreme Court; 1997–1999	Succeeded by William Ray Price Jr.
Preceded by Theodore McMillian	Judge of the United States Court of Appeals for the Eighth Circuit; 2004–2026	Succeeded by Justin D. Smith
