= William Howard Billings =

American judge

William H. Billings

Chief Justice of Missouri
- In office July 1, 1987 – June 30, 1989
- Preceded by: Andrew Jackson Higgins
- Succeeded by: Charles Blakey Blackmar

Judge of the Supreme Court of Missouri
- In office October 1, 1982 – May 23, 1991
- Appointed by: Christopher S. "Kit" Bond
- Succeeded by: Duane Benton

Personal details
- Born: August 21, 1921 Kennett, Missouri
- Died: May 23, 1991 (aged 69) Jefferson City, Missouri
- Spouse: Wilda Billings
- Education: University of Missouri School of Law

William Howard Billings (August 21, 1921 – May 23, 1991) was a judge of the Supreme Court of Missouri. Prior to his appointment by then-Governor Kit Bond, he had been a member of the Missouri Court of Appeals in Springfield, and before that a circuit court judge; both times he was appointed by Democratic governor Warren Hearnes. Judge Billings was noted for his hard work ethic and his unwavering dedication to upholding the highest standards expected of judges; however, he was found by a federal judge to have violated the court's canon of ethics by telephoning an expert without the consent of the parties' attorneys. He was also a staunch opponent of allowing cameras into courtrooms, and once threw out two journalists from the Missouri Supreme Court Building. He died less than two months before he was supposed to retire, under Missouri's age limit for judges.
