= Dale A. Whitman =

American academic

- Born: 1939 (age 86–87)
- Occupation: Professor of Law
- Known for: Former dean of the University of Missouri School of Law
- Title: Professor
- Spouse: Marjorie Miller (m. 1962)
- Children: 8
- Awards: Order of the Coif

Academic background
- Education: Duke University, LL.B. (1966); Brigham Young University, B.E.S. (1963)

Academic work
- Discipline: Law
- Institutions: University of Missouri; University of North Carolina at Chapel Hill; Brigham Young University; University of Washington; Washington University in St. Louis; Arizona State University
- Main interests: Property; Real Estate Finance
- Website: Mizzou Law Profile

Dale A. Whitman is an American academic who is the former James E. Campbell Professor of Law at the University of Missouri in Columbia, MO, where he retired in 2007. He received his B.E.S. degree in electrical engineering from Brigham Young University (BYU) in 1963 and his LL.B. from Duke University in 1966.

After practicing for a short period with the firm of O'Melveny & Myers, LLP in Los Angeles, CA. Whitman began his academic career at the University of North Carolina. He is a co-author of five books and numerous articles in these areas. In 1973, Whitman was among the founding faculty of the Brigham Young University Law School.

Whitman taught at BYU and then moved to the University of Missouri (MU) after a visiting professorship there in 1976. He went on to teach at the University of Washington in 1978, where he also served as associate dean before returning to MU in 1982 to become the law school's dean (1982 - 1988). Whitman specializes in property law, and he was the reporter for the Uniform Non-Judicial Foreclosure Act, approved in 2002. In that same year, he also served as president of the Association of American Law Schools.

Whitman retired from MU in the summer of 2007, taught at Washington University School of Law and the University of Florida during the 2007-08 academic year. Whitman was a visiting professor at the University of Arkansas School of Law and currently teaches at Arizona State University Sandra Day O'Connor School of Law beginning in 2019.
