= Warren Dee Welliver =

American judge

Judge of the Supreme Court of Missouri
- In office January 9, 1979 – September 8, 1989
- Appointed by: Joseph P. Teasdale
- Succeeded by: John C. Holstein

Personal details
- Born: February 24, 1920 Butler, Missouri
- Died: October 29, 2007 (aged 87) Columbia, Missouri
- Spouse: Ruth Welliver
- Education: University of Missouri School of Law; University of Missouri

Warren Dee Welliver (February 24, 1920 – October 29, 2007) was judge on the Supreme Court of Missouri from 1979 until 1989. As a judge, he established Comparative Negligence as a defense in civil tort lawsuits, overruling the older Contributory Negligence standard. Judge Welliver was also famously passed up for Chief Justice; traditionally the judges take turns in the two-year job but Welliver was bypassed for the position. Judge Welliver was also known for his strong stances in favor of protecting a criminal defendant's rights at trial, and his opposition to the Missouri Plan.
