= CSDR =

CSDR is an initialism that may refer to:

- California School for the Deaf, Riverside, a school in Riverside, California, United States of America
- Center for the Study of Dispute Resolution, a research center under the University of Missouri School of Law
- Channasandra railway station, Bengaluru, Karnataka, India
- Confederaţia Sindicatelor Democratice din România, the Democratic Trade Union Confederation of Romania
- Central securities depository Regulation (No. 909/2014) of the European Union
- Consortium for Social Development & Research at the University of the West Indies Open Campus
