= Justin D. Smith =

American judge (born 1985)

Justin Smith
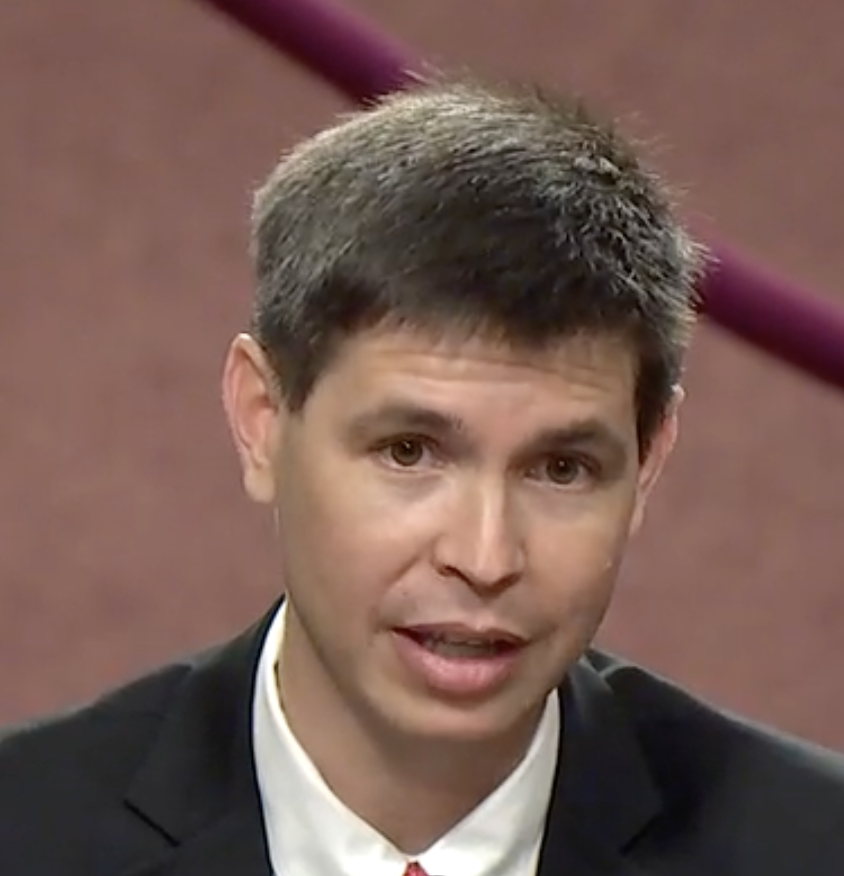

Judge of the United States Court of Appeals for the Eighth Circuit
- Incumbent
- Assumed office June 18, 2026
- Appointed by: Donald Trump
- Preceded by: Duane Benton

Personal details
- Born: Justin Daniel Smith; 1985 (age 40–41) Des Moines, Iowa, U.S.
- Education: University of Missouri, Kansas City (BA); University of Missouri, Columbia (JD)

Justin Daniel Smith (born 1985) is a lawyer who has served as a United States circuit judge of the United States Court of Appeals for the Eighth Circuit since 2026. Nominated by President Donald Trump, he was a partner at the James Otis Law Group before becoming a federal judge.

== Education ==
Smith graduated from the University of Missouri–Kansas City with a Bachelor of Arts degree, summa cum laude, in 2007 and University of Missouri School of Law with a Juris Doctor, magna cum laude, in 2010. In 2010, he was an intern to Judge Nanette Kay Laughrey of the United States District Court for the Western District of Missouri.

== Career ==
From 2010 to 2016, Smith was an associate at the law firm of Shook, Hardy & Bacon in Kansas City, where he focused on civil litigation and regulatory law. From 2017 to 2018, he was Deputy Counsel to Missouri Governor Eric Greitens. From 2018 to 2019, he was General Counsel to the Missouri Department of Agriculture. From 2019 to 2023, Smith was a prosecutor in the Missouri Attorney General's office. In 2023, Smith was a Senior Advisor to United States Senator Eric Schmitt. From 2024 to 2026, he was a partner at the James Otis Law Group, LLC at its Saint Louis office. During this period, Smith served as the personal lawyer of President Donald Trump, and, alongside future Solicitor General D. John Sauer, successfully crafted the legal arguments that would outline the extent of presidential immunity in Trump v. United States. Additionally, during and at the time of his federal judicial nomination, Smith actively represented Trump in his appeal before the Supreme Court regarding Trump's civil verdict of sexual assault against journalist E. Jean Carroll.

=== Federal judicial service ===
In late 2025, Senator Eric Schmitt recommended Smith to a seat on the United States Court of Appeals for the Eighth Circuit. President Donald Trump formally nominated him on March 2, 2026 to succeed Judge Duane Benton, who had taken senior status. On April 15, 2026, he testified before the Senate Judiciary Committee regarding his nomination. During his hearing he was questioned on the extent of his professional relationship with Donald Trump, and, whether having acted as his personal lawyer, he would be capable of having the impartiality necessary for a federal judge. Smith was further questioned regarding his views on whether or not Joe Biden legitimately won the 2020 election, to which Smith responded that "Congress certified Joe Biden as the president." On May 14, 2026, Smith's nomination was reported to the full Senate by a 12–10 party-line vote. On June 11, 2026, the Senate invoked cloture on a 47–43 vote, and on June 15, 2026, his nomination was confirmed by a 48–43 vote. He received his judicial commission on June 18, 2026.

== See also ==
- Donald Trump judicial appointment controversies

Legal offices
Preceded by Duane Benton	Judge of the United States Court of Appeals for the Eighth Circuit; 2026–present	Incumbent
