= Favazza =

Favazza is an Italian surname. Notable people with the surname include:

- Armando Favazza (born 1941), American author and psychiatrist
- Joseph A. Favazza, American religious scholar and academic administrator
- Mariano Favazza (born 1952), American state court judge
- Valentina Favazza (born 1987), Italian voice actress
