= Quigless =

Quigless may refer to:

- Quigless Clinic, North Carolina
- Angela T. Quigless, Missouri State judge
- Helen G. Quigless, American librarian and poet
