= Connie L. Johnson =

American politician (born 1969)

Connie LaJoyce Johnson

Member of the Missouri House of Representatives from the 61st district
- In office 2001 -

Personal details
- Born: July 1, 1969 (age 57) Chicago, Illinois
- Party: Democratic Party
- Education: Bradley University, Saint Louis University School of Law
- Profession: Attorney, Adjunct professor

Connie LaJoyce Johnson (born July 1, 1969, in Chicago, Illinois) is a Democratic member of the Missouri House of Representatives, representing District 61 since 2001. She is currently Minority Whip.

She received a bachelor's degree from Bradley University, a JD from Saint Louis University School of Law, and a master's degree in Health Administration from Saint Louis University.
