= Angela T. Quigless =

American Missouri Court of Appeals judge (born 1960)

Angela Turner Quigless (born January 4, 1960, in Miami, Florida) is an American Missouri Court of Appeals judge. She was appointed by Governor Bob Holden as the Circuit Judge for the 22nd Judicial Circuit of the City of St. Louis, Missouri on January 3, 2003, previously serving as an Associate Circuit Judge since February 28, 1995.

== Early life and education ==
Quigless attended Florissant Valley Community College in Florissant, Missouri from 1977 to 1979. She graduated from University of Missouri in Columbia with a Bachelor of Arts in Sociology in 1981. She graduated from Saint Louis University School of Law in St. Louis, Missouri with a juris doctor in 1984.

== Career ==
Before becoming a judge, Quigless was an Assistant U.S. Attorney for the Eastern District of Missouri, an Assistant City Counselor and an Assistant Circuit Attorney for the City of St. Louis.

In March 2003, after eight years as an associate circuit judge in the court, Quigless was appointed Circuit Judge in the City of St. Louis.

She is a member of the American Bar Association, Women Lawyer's Association, National Association of Women Judges, the Lawyers' Association, and the American Judicature Society.

== Personal life ==
Quigless is married and the mother of a son, Charles (born 2001).
