= Saint Louis University Law Journal =

- Discipline: Law review
- Language: English

Publication details
- Former name: Intramural Law Review of St. Louis University
- History: 1949–present
- Publisher: Saint Louis University School of Law (United States)
- Frequency: Quarterly

Standard abbreviations
- Bluebook: St. Louis U. L.J.
- ISO 4: St. Louis Univ. Law J.

Indexing
- ISSN: 0036-3030

Links
- Journal homepage

The Saint Louis University Law Journal is the flagship law review at Saint Louis University School of Law. It is student-run and publishes four issues a year: the General Issue, Teaching Issue, Childress Issue, and Symposium Issue. It was established in 1949 as the Intramural Law Review of St. Louis University.

The journal contains articles written by legal scholars in addition to student-written notes and comments. The journal also has an online companion, Saint Louis University Law Journal Online, where shorter-form articles are published on a rolling basis.

== Admissions ==
The Law Journal accepts new members through an annual write-on competition held after spring exams. The competition includes two components: a shorter comment about a timely issue and a BlueBooking exercise. Candidates are then evaluated on their writing and BlueBooking skills as well as their grades.

== Notable Authors ==
=== Judges ===
- Sandra Day O'Connor, former Associate Justice of the United States Supreme Court.
- Antonio Lamer, former Chief Justice of the Supreme Court of Canada.
- Albie Sachs, former Associate Justice of the Constitutional Court of South Africa.

=== Scholars ===
- Thomas W. Merrill, Charles Keller Beekman Professor of Law, Columbia Law School.
- Erwin Chemerinsky, Dean of University of California, Berkeley School of Law.
- Harold Hongju Koh, Dean and Gerard C. & Bernice Latrobe Smith Professor of International Law, Yale Law School.
- Richard H. Fallon Jr., Ralph S. Tyler, Jr. Professor of Constitutional Law, Harvard Law School.
- David A. Strauss, Harry N. Wyatt Professor of Law, University of Chicago School of Law.
- Jerold H. Israel, Ed Rood Eminent Scholar in Trial Advocacy & Procedure, University of Florida Levin College of Law.
- Samuel Estreicher, Dwight D. Opperman Professor of Law, New York University School of Law.
