= Mary Rhodes Russell =

American judge (born 1958)

Mary Russell
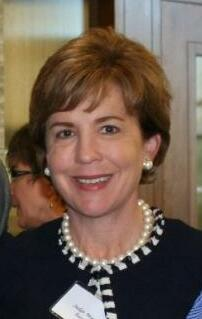

Chief Justice of the Missouri Supreme Court
- In office July 1, 2023 – June 30, 2025
- Preceded by: Paul C. Wilson
- Succeeded by: W. Brent Powell
- In office July 1, 2013 – June 30, 2015
- Preceded by: Richard B. Teitelman
- Succeeded by: Patricia Breckenridge

Justice of the Missouri Supreme Court
- Incumbent
- Assumed office September 20, 2004
- Appointed by: Bob Holden
- Preceded by: Duane Benton

Personal details
- Born: July 28, 1958 (age 68) Hannibal, Missouri, U.S.
- Education: Truman State University (BS); University of Missouri (JD)

Mary Rhodes Russell (born July 28, 1958) is a judge of the Supreme Court of Missouri. She previously served a two-year term as chief justice from July 2013 through June 2015 and again from 2023 to 2025.

In 1980, she graduated summa cum laude from Truman State University (Northeast Missouri State University) and received her Juris Doctor degree in 1983 from the University of Missouri. She served as a law clerk for George Gunn at the Supreme Court of Missouri, before entering private practice in Hannibal, Missouri.

She served on the Missouri Court of Appeals, Eastern District, from 1994 to 2004 and served as chief judge from 1999 to 2000.

On September 20, 2004, she was appointed by Governor Bob Holden to serve as a judge of the Supreme Court of Missouri.

Legal offices
Preceded by Duane Benton	Judge of the Missouri Supreme Court; 2004–present	Incumbent
Preceded by Richard B. Teitelman	Chief Justice of the Missouri Supreme Court; 2013–2015	Succeeded by Patricia Breckenridge
Preceded by Paul C. Wilson	Chief Justice of the Missouri Supreme Court; 2023–2025	Succeeded by W. Brent Powell
