= Charles Blakey Blackmar =

American judge (1922–2007)

Charles B. Blackmar

Chief Justice of Missouri
- In office July 1, 1989 – June 30, 1991
- Preceded by: William Howard Billings
- Succeeded by: Edward D. Robertson Jr.

Judge of the Supreme Court of Missouri
- In office December 15, 1982 – April 1, 1992
- Appointed by: Christopher S. "Kit" Bond
- Succeeded by: William Ray Price Jr.

Personal details
- Born: Charles Blakey Blackmar; April 19, 1922 Kansas City, Missouri
- Died: January 20, 2007 (aged 84) Clearwater, Florida
- Spouse(s): Ellen Day Bonnifield (1943–1983); Jeanne Stephens Lee (1984–2007)
- Education: Princeton University; University of Michigan Law School

Charles B. Blackmar (April 19, 1922 – January 20, 2007) was a judge of the Supreme Court of Missouri from 1982 to 1992, and chief justice of the court from 1989 to 1991. He was appointed to the court by Governor Kit Bond.

Charles Blakey Blackmar graduated from Southwest High School in Kansas City, Missouri. He graduated summa cum laude from Princeton University in 1942, where he was a politics major, won the John G. Buchanan Prize, was elected to Phi Beta Kappa, and was a member of Gateway Club. After graduating from Princeton, Blackmar enlisted in the Army, and served for four years in the European Theatre during World War II.

He served as a first lieutenant in the Seventh Army and earned a Silver Star, Bronze Star Medal, and Purple Heart. After returning to the United States, Blackmar graduated from the University of Michigan Law School. He practiced law in Kansas City until 1966, when he joined the faculty of the St. Louis University School of Law. While a professor, Blackmar served as special assistant attorney general of Missouri and wrote books and articles.

Blackmar was appointed to the Missouri Supreme Court, beginning his tenure on December 15, 1982. As a judge on the Missouri Supreme Court, he drew attention for his dissent in the case of Cruzan v. Director, Missouri Department of Health, which was later appealed to the Supreme Court of the United States. Blackmar argued that decisions on medical treatment for incompetent family members are properly left where they historically have been made, to the family without interference from the state, and that "the very existence of capital punishment demonstrates a relativity of values by establishing the proposition that some lives are not worth preserving."

Blackmar was chief justice of the Missouri Supreme Court from July 1, 1989, to June 30, 1991. He retired from the court on April 1, 1992, and in retirement promoted stem-cell research and the abolition of capital punishment. After he retired, he was cited by opponents of John Ashcroft's appointment to be Attorney General under then-President George W. Bush because of his accusation that Ashcroft "tamper[ed] with the judiciary."

== Personal life ==
Blackmar married Ellen Day Bonnifield in 1943 and had five children and eight grandchildren. He died in Belleair, Florida, on January 20, 2007, aged 84.
