= Isaak Dore =

Zambian-American law professor

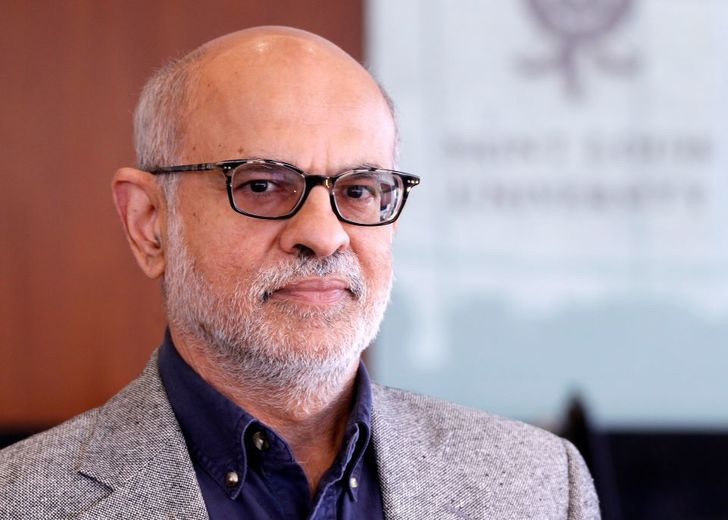
- Born: Lusaka, Zambia
- Occupations: Law professor, legal philosopher, and writer
- Awards: Honorary Doctorate from the University of Orléans

Academic background
- Education: University of Zambia; Yale Law School

Isaak Dore is a legal philosopher, writer, and Distinguished Professor of Law and Philosophy Emeritus at St. Louis University School of Law. He has authored numerous articles and books on jurisprudence, international law, legal anthropology, and United States constitutional law. In recognition of his contributions to French legal education, he was awarded an honorary doctorate by the University of Orléans.

== Early life ==
Born in Lusaka, Zambia, Dore earned his LL.B. from the University of Zambia in 1972 and an LL.M. in 1975. Following his LL.B., he served as Public Prosecutor and Legal Aid Counsel in Zambia's Ministry of Legal Affairs for two years. He also worked as Assistant Editor of the Zambia Law Reports from 1970-1975. As a Sterling Fellow at Yale Law School, he obtained a second LL.M. in 1975 and a J.S.D. in 1978. He later served as a Human Rights Officer and Special Consultant in the United Nations Division of Human Rights in Geneva before transitioning to academia in the United States.

== Academic career and teaching ==
Dore began teaching as a Lecturer at the University of Zambia in 1976. In 1979, he joined Southern Illinois University School of Law and later moved to St. Louis University School of Law, where he founded the Center for International and Comparative Law and served as its co-director of for a decade. Over his 35-year teaching career, he specialized in jurisprudence, international law, legal anthropology, and constitutional law.

Dore also lectured in Africa, Latin America, Europe and the Middle East. He served as a visiting professor for fifteen years in France at institutions including Paris Dauphine University, Toulouse Capitole University, University of Orléans, and the Marie and Louis Pasteur University (formerly known as the University of Franche-Comté). His teaching abroad led to several publications in French academic journals and books. In recogniction of these contributions, he received an honorary doctorate from the University of Orléans, France.

== Research and scholarship ==
At St. Louis University School of Law, Dore established a partnership with the University of Warsaw, resulting in the creation of the St. Louis-Warsaw Transatlantic Law Journal, where he served as the Editor-in-Chief for five years. His research interests include international law, international arbitration, legal philosophy, political theory, ethics, and western philosophy.

Dore’s work has been reviewed in academic journals. His analysis of UNCITRAL's Model Law was praised for bridging theory and practice, though some reviewers suggested broader comparisons. His book on Namibia's mandate system was noted for its critique of South Africa's apartheid policies and enforcement failures. His work on international law and superpowers was recognized for its anthropological framing of interbloc reciprocity.

Over the past two decades, Dore’s scholarship has examined the intersection of law with other disciplines, including philosophy, political theory, anthropology, linguistics, and sociology. His work explores foundational questions about legal epistemology, normativity, and justice through a multidisciplinary lens. The following are summaries of three major publications:

=== The Epistemological Foundations of Law (2007) ===
Dore's 2007 book The Epistemological Foundations of Law investigates the philosophical foundations of law beginning with Socrates' assertion that law constitutes a truth claim. It explores whether eternal truths about law exist and whether they are knowable. Key questions include the nature of law, the role of reason in legal inquiry, the relationship between law and morality, and the basis of legal obligation.

This book traces these themes across eight historical and philosophical periods:

- Pre-philosophical era (Greek poets and playwrights such as homer, Hesiod, and Sophocles)
- Presocratic period (625-470 BCE)
- Postsocratic period
- Roman period
- Medieval and Christian period
- Enlightenment
- Modern period
- Postmodern period

Each chapter critically examines the evolution of legal thought within these contexts. The book may be used as a standalone treatise or as a pedagogical resource, as it is accompanied by a teacher's manual.

=== Homo Juridicus: Culture as a Normative Order (2016) ===
In this work, Dore examines the normative structures underlying social and cultural formations. Dore deconstructs the concept of normativity and analyzes its expression through anthropology, sociology, psychology, linguistics, and philosophy. The book considers how legal and non-legal norms contribute to social order, challenging conventional assumptions about the role of law in cultural systems. This book is also intended for either independent study or instructional use, as it is accompanied by a teacher’s manual.

=== A Materialist Theory of Justice: A Methodological, Philosophical and Moral Justification (2025) ===
In this book, Dore presents a theory of justice grounded in three forms of justification: methodological, philosophical, and moral. The methodological framework draws on Karl Marx’s materialist epistemology, emphasizing empirical reliability. The philosophical component engages with classical and modern traditions, while the moral justification introduces principles aimed at promoting human flourishing through individual and governmental action.

The theory contrasts with proceduralist models such as that of John Rawls, which prioritize fairness of process over substantive outcomes. Dore proposes a “thick,” outcome-oriented theory of justice that shifts focus from procedural means to ethical ends.

The book advances the “inseparability thesis,” which posits that individuals are socially embedded and that justice must account for structural conditions of equality. It integrates elements from Aristotelian essentialism, Hegelian phenomenalism, and critical theory, drawing on thinkers including Hobbes, Aquinas, Kant, Dewey, Mead, Habermas, Foucault, Lyotard, Honneth, Sandel, Walzer, Nussbaum, Keynes, Sen, and Marx.

Using this methodological framework, the book offers anthropological and philosophical critiques of Western liberal political and economic systems, with particular attention to the United States. It argues that these systems perpetuate structural inequalities through mechanisms of domination and exploitation.

Dore is currently writing a prequel to this book titled Mind vs Matter: Metaphysics, Ideology and The Ethics of Ontological Closure. The companion volume will deepen the epistemological and ethical foundations presented in A Materialist Theory of Justice by examining the conditions in which matter becomes intelligible to the mind, without resorting to metaphysical guarantees or non-falsifiable methodologies. It will discuss early Greek atomist philosophy, quantum field theory, and a critique of Aristotelian metaphysics to explain how dissent, empirical truth, and alternative modes of inquiry may be suppressed or foreclosed by ontological closure. This volume is intended to be historical, methodological and ethical. It will deal with inquiries such as what epistemic openness may be required to resist systems that tend to totalize reality, as well as what sort of materialist ethics may emerge from such resistance.

== Honors and awards ==
- Honorary Doctorate (Docteur honoris causa), the University of Orléans, France (2002).
- Sterling Fellow, Yale Law School (1975-1977).

== Select publications ==
- Dore, Isaak (1984). International Law and the Superpowers: Normative Order in a Divided World. Rutgers University Press. ISBN 978-0813510149.
- Dore, Isaak (1985). The International Mandate System and Namibia. Westview Press. ISBN 0-86531-879-4.
- Dore, Isaak (1986). Arbitration and Conciliation under The UNCITRAL Rules: A Textual Analysis. Martinus Nijhoff. ISBN 978-08-98-38913-5.
- Dore, Isaak (1990). Theory and Practice of Multiparty Commercial Arbitration. Graham and Trotman/Martinus Nijhoff. ISBN 1853333182.
- Dore, Isaak (1993). The UNCITRAL Framework for Arbitration in Contemporary Perspective. Graham and Trotman/Martinus Nijhoff. ISBN 1853335738.
- Dore, Isaak (2007). The Epistemological Foundations of Law. Carolina Academic Press. ISBN 978-1-59460-387-7.
- Dore, Isaak (2016). Homo Juridicus: Culture as a Normative Order. Carolina Academic Press. ISBN 978-1-61163-697-0.
- Dore, Isaak (2025). A Materialist Theory of Justice: A Methodological, Philosophical and Moral Justification. Palgrave Macmillan. ISBN 978-3-031-74337-5.

== Select articles ==
- Dore, Isaak (1988). "The United States, Self-defense and the U.N. Charter: A Comment on Principle and Expediency in Legal Reasoning". Stanford Journal of International Law. 24: 1–19.
- Dore, Isaak (1995). "The Distribution of Governmental Power Under the Constitution of Russia". Parker School Journal of East European Law. 2 (6). Columbia University: 673.
- Dore, Isaak (2005). "L'influence Française sur la Nouvelle Épistémologie Juridique Post-moderne aux États Unis" (PDF). Les Archives de Philosophie. 49: 365–399.
- Dore, Isaak (February 10, 2008). "La Discrimination liée à l'âge dans le Travail aux États Unis". In Binet, Jean-René (ed.). Droit et Vieillissement de la Personne. LexisNexis LITEC. ISBN 9782711011131.
- Dore, Isaak (2009). "La Force Normative du Pouvoir Étatique dans La Philosophie de Michel Foucault". In Thibierge, Catherine (ed.). La Force Normative: Naissance d'un Concept. LGDJ; Bruylant. ISBN 978-2-275-03401-0.
- Dore, Isaak (May 18, 2017). "Code-based Systems of Law: Heretical Reflections of a Common Law Agent Provocateur". In Massart, Thibaut; Mbotaingar, Abdoulaye (eds.). Liber Amicorum en l'honneur du Professeur Joël Monéger. LexisNexis. ISBN 9782711026913.
- Dore, Isaak (March 13, 2017). "Same Sex Marriage in the United States: Intersection of Law and Politics". In Dorsman, Anne; Lapérou-Scheneider, Béatrice; Kondratuk, Laurent (eds.). Genre, famille et vulnérabilité : Mélanges en l'honneur de Catherine Philippe. L'Harmattan. ISBN 978-2343112404.
