= James W. Gray =

American judge and politician

James W. Gray (September 21, 1915 – August 5, 1987) was an American judge and politician.

Gray was born in East St. Louis, Illinois. He went to Central Catholic High School in East St. Louis. Gray graduated from University of Illinois, Saint Louis University School of Law and was admitted to the Illinois and Missouri bars. Gray served in the United States Army during World War II. Gray lived in Belleville, Illinois with his wife and family and practiced law. Gray served in the Illinois House of Representatives from 1949 to 1951 and in the Illinois Senate from 1951 to 1963. Gray was a Democrat. Gray served as a probate and circuit court judge for St. Clair County, Illinois. Gray died from a heart attack at his home in South Pasadena, Florida.
