= Theodore McMillian =

American judge (1919–2006)

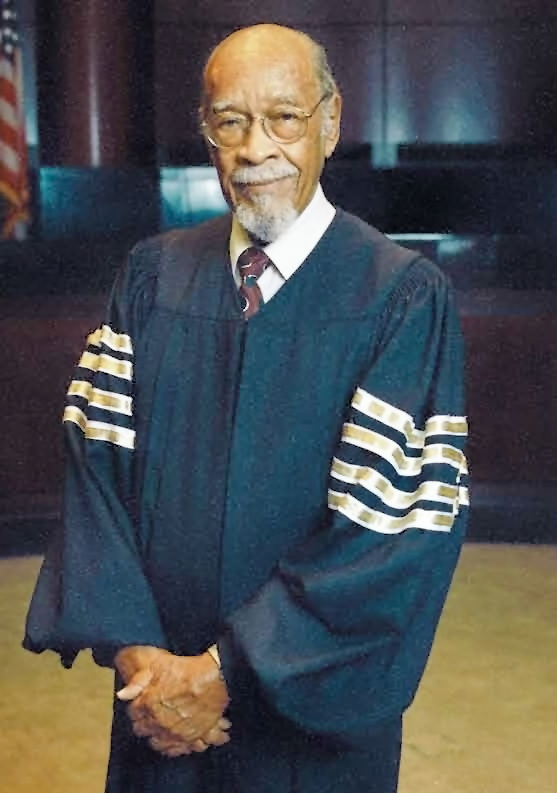

Senior Judge of the United States Court of Appeals for the Eighth Circuit
- In office July 1, 2003 – January 18, 2006

Judge of the United States Court of Appeals for the Eighth Circuit
- In office September 23, 1978 – July 1, 2003
- Appointed by: Jimmy Carter
- Preceded by: William H. Webster
- Succeeded by: Duane Benton

Personal details
- Born: Theodore McMillian; January 28, 1919 St. Louis, Missouri
- Died: January 18, 2006 (aged 86) St. Louis, Missouri
- Education: Lincoln University (BS); Saint Louis University (LLB)

Theodore McMillian (January 28, 1919 – January 18, 2006) was the first African American to serve on the Missouri Court of Appeals, and the first African American to serve as a United States circuit judge of the United States Court of Appeals for the Eighth Circuit.

== Education and career ==
Born in St. Louis, Missouri, McMillian attended Vashon High School. He received a Bachelor of Science degree from Lincoln University in 1941. He received a Bachelor of Laws from Saint Louis University School of Law in 1949. He was in the United States Army from 1942 to 1946. He was in private practice of law in St. Louis from 1949 to 1953. He was an assistant circuit attorney of City of St. Louis from 1953 to 1956. He was a judge of the Circuit Court in St. Louis from 1956 to 1972 and was an associate professor at the University of Missouri–St. Louis from 1970 to 1972. He was appointed by Governor Warren E. Hearnes as a judge of the Eastern Division of the Missouri Court of Appeals from 1972 to 1978, being retained in 1974. He was a faculty member of the National College of Juvenile Justice at the University of Nevada, Reno from 1972 to 1977. He was an associate professor of the Webster College Graduate Program in 1977.

=== Other service ===
McMillian served as board chairman of the Human Development Corporation, local CAP agency, Minority Economic Development Agency and the Herbert Hoover’s Boys Club of St. Louis. He served as a board member of the American Judicature Society, Blue Cross Hospital Association and Urban League. He was a member of the St. Louis University’s President’s Council and board of trustees of the St. Louis Junior College District.

== Federal judicial service ==
McMillian was nominated by President Jimmy Carter on August 3, 1978, to a seat on the United States Court of Appeals for the Eighth Circuit vacated by Judge William H. Webster. He was confirmed by the United States Senate on September 22, 1978, and received his commission on September 23, 1978. He assumed senior status on July 1, 2003. His service was terminated on January 18, 2006, due to his death in St. Louis.

== See also ==
- List of African-American federal judges
- List of African-American jurists

Legal offices
Preceded by William H. Webster	Judge of the United States Court of Appeals for the Eighth Circuit; 1978–2003	Succeeded by Duane Benton
