= Saint Louis University School of Law =

Private law school in St. Louis, Missouri, US

Coordinates: 38.637683°N 90.237025°W

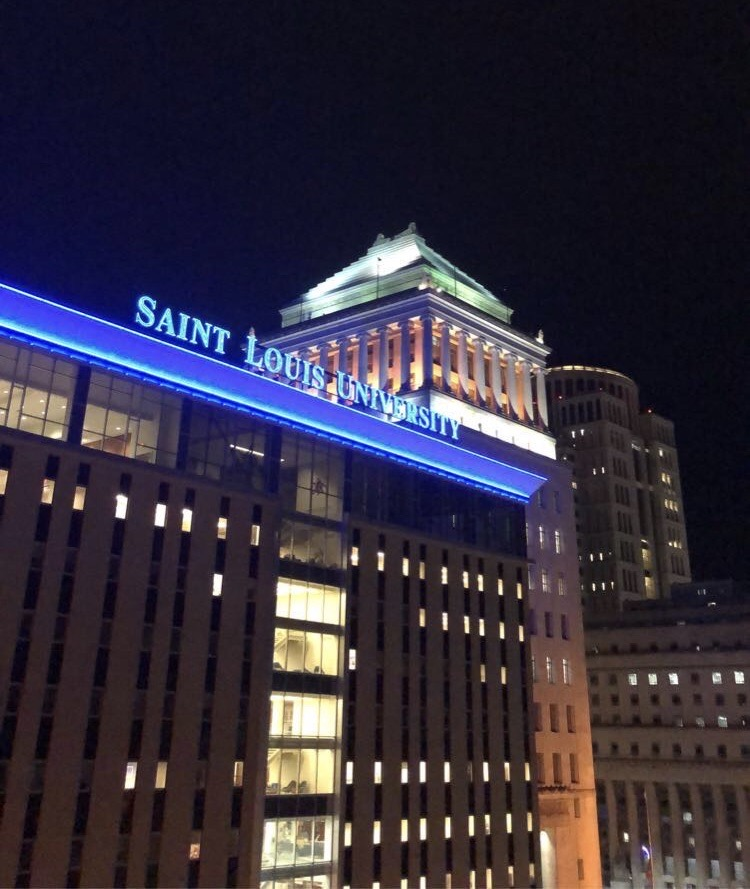
- Motto: Ad maiorem Dei gloriam (Latin) "For the greater glory of God"
- Parent school: Saint Louis University
- Religious affiliation: Roman Catholic; Society of Jesus (Jesuit)
- Established: 1843–1847 (original); 1908; 118 years ago (re-establishment)
- School type: Private
- Parent endowment: $1.3 billion
- Dean: Twinette L. Johnson
- Location: St. Louis, Missouri, US
- Enrollment: 601 (2023)
- Faculty: 54 (2023)
- USNWR ranking: 94th (tie) (2025)
- Bar pass rate: 95.09% (Pass in two years); 86.74% (2023 first-time takers)
- Website: law.slu.edu

The Saint Louis University School of Law (also known as SLU Law) is the law school affiliated with Saint Louis University, a private Jesuit research university in St. Louis, Missouri. The school has been American Bar Association approved since 1924 and is a member of the Association of American Law Schools.

== History ==
The Law School was initially founded by Richard Aylett Buckner, a Kentucky district judge, and was opened in 1843, making it the first law school to open west of the Mississippi River. The original law school closed at some point after Buckner died in 1847. The school was re-established in 1908 in the Midtown neighborhood on the corner of Leffingwell Avenue and Locust Street. In its 1908 re-establishment, the law school accepted its first female law students. In August 2013, the school moved to its current location, Scott Hall, a new facility at 100 North Tucker Boulevard in Downtown St. Louis.

== Facilities ==
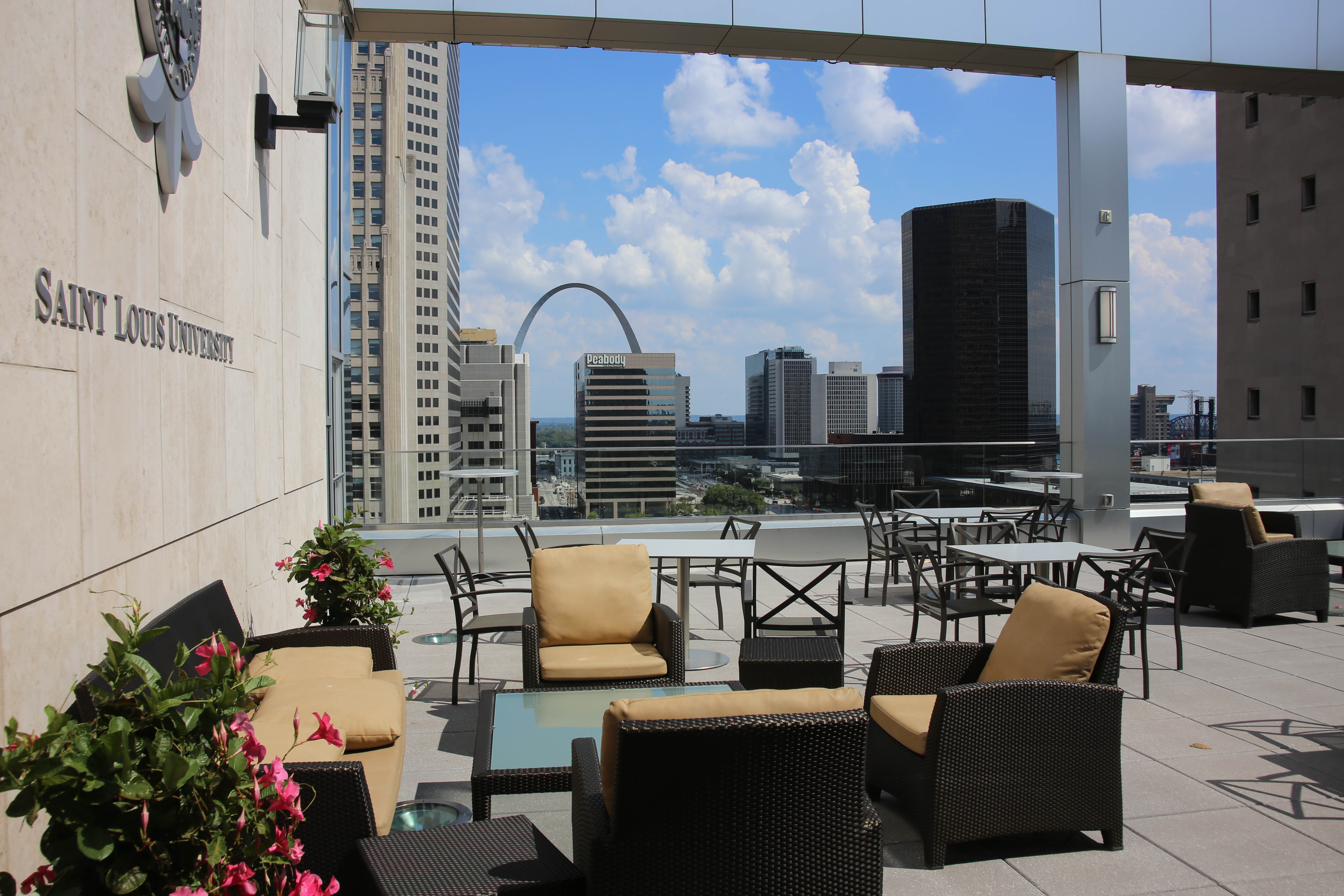
12th-floor rooftop at Scott Hall

The Law School is located in Scott Hall, a 12-story facility located at 100 North Tucker Boulevard in Downtown St. Louis. The building contains classrooms; the Vincent C. Immel Law Library, named after a former professor who taught at the Law School from 1958 to 2004, the school's administrative and faculty offices; event space; and a restaurant called "Chris' at the Docket." The legal clinics are housed on the 7th floor of the building. The 12th floor, which was added to the building during renovations, is almost entirely glass, is home to a court room that occasionally hears appeals for the Eastern District of Missouri and offers views of the surrounding downtown area. The school's downtown location puts it in close proximity to many law firms and city, state, and federal courts.

Prior to Scott Hall, the law school was housed in three buildings on the main SLU campus in Midtown with a separate clinic building located on Spring Street.

== Academics ==
=== Admissions ===
In 2024, the school accepted 487 of 785 applicants for an admissions rate of 62.04%. Of those accepted, 179 enrolled as full-time students and 18 as part-time students for a yield rate of 39.01%. The median LSAT score for both full-time and part-time students was 156 and the median undergraduate GPA was 3.64 for full-time students (two students were not included in the calculation) and 2.99 for part-time students.

As of October 5, 2024, the first year student enrollment had a gender distribution of 113 female, 83 male, and 2 Gender Identity X (not exclusively male or female), and consisted of 137 white students, 19 Black students, 7 Asian students, and 18 Hispanic or Latino students of any race.

109 undergraduate institutions were represented in the 2021 incoming class and students were from 29 different U.S. states and 3 foreign countries.

=== Rankings ===
In 2025, U.S. News & World Report ranked Saint Louis University School of Law tied for 94th in the "Best Law Schools" list of 196 schools. The Law School's Health Care Law program was ranked 2nd best in the country. The Part-Time Program was ranked 29th out of 68 schools.

=== Degree programs ===
The Law School offers both J.D. and LL.M degrees. In addition to the law school-specific programs, the Law School offers a variety of dual-degree programs:

- J.D./Master of Accounting
- J.D./Master of Business Administration
- J.D./Master of Health Administration
- J.D./Master of Arts in Political Science and Public Affairs
- J.D./Master of Public Health
- J.D./Master of Social Work
- J.D./Master of Arts in Sociology
- J.D./Ph.D. in Health Care Ethics

=== Full-time program ===
In their first year, full-time students are required to take the Law School's core curriculum. This includes 31 hours of coursework in civil procedure, constitutional law, contract law, criminal law, property law, torts, a course in legal analysis, research, & communications ("LARC"), as well as an introduction to legal studies course. After their first year, full-time students are allowed greater flexibility in their course selection, choosing from a selection of upper-division course electives to complete the required 91 credit hours; however, the ABA and the school requires completion of a legal professions course, six hours of "experiential courses" (i.e., classes that give students practice in professional skills), and a seminar class during which students write a long-form legal research essay.

=== Part-time program ===
The Law School offers both a part-time day program and a part-time evening program. Students in the part-time program can choose between an 11.5 hour and an 8.5 hour per semester schedule for their first two years that matches the classes the full-time students take. Following the first two years, part-time students select electives with the same requirements as full-time students and typically graduate with their J.D. in four to five years. As of 2024, the part-time program was ranked 29th out of 68 part-time programs by U.S. News & World Report.

=== LL.M program ===
The law school offers two LL.M programs. One of the programs is an LL.M in American law for foreign lawyers, which is a one-year program for foreign law school graduates seeking to start working in the United States. The Law School also offers an LL.M. in health law. In 2025, the school was ranked 2nd in Health Care Law by U.S. News & World Report.

=== Concentrations ===
In addition to their regular J.D., students may choose a concentration in employment law, health law, intellectual property law, or international and comparative law.

=== Examinations ===
First-year students take four final examinations each semester, one for each class other than legal research and writing. All other students self-schedule their exams. Generally the exam period is two weeks long; graduating students are required to complete exams in a shorter time. Students may choose between typing their exams on laptop computers or handwriting them.

== Centers and clinics ==
=== Center for Health Law Studies ===
The center was first established in 1982 and focuses on the intersection between health care systems and the legal system. The center has twelve full-time faculty members and four affiliated faculty members who publish work in law, medicine and ethical journals. It offers a range of health law courses taught by full-time faculty, including foundational and specialized health law courses each semester. The Center also hosts the Saint Louis University Journal of Health Law & Policy and hosts a speaker series as well as an annual Health Law Symposium.

Students involved in the Center also have the opportunity to spend a semester in Washington, D.C. clerking full time for health-related federal agency. Past agencies have included the U.S. Department of Veterans Affairs, U.S. Department of Health and Human Services, and the Federal Trade Commission's Bureau of Competition's Health Care Division.

=== Center for International and Comparative Law ===
The Center for International and Comparative Law ("CICL") promotes legal scholarship regarding international law. The school offers both pragmatic and theory based courses, including, but not limited to, public international law, international trade, multinational corporate responsibility, international tax, comparative law, immigration law, international criminal law, gender rights and international human rights.

Additionally, there are several ways for students to get involved with international law outside of the classroom. There are multiple opportunities to study law in foreign countries with study abroad programs in Madrid, Berlin, Orléans, Paris, Bochum, and Cork. The school has a Jessup Moot Court Team. In 2023, the team took second place in the Midwest Regional Rounds held in Chicago and won third best brief. Previous, the team had advanced to the semi-final rounds of the 2009 Southwest Super Regionals in Houston, Texas, and subsequently won third place for best brief overall. The school also has a chapter of the International Law Student Association, commonly called ILSA, that is student-led and organized.

In conjunction with Saint Louis University Law Journal, CICL hosts a biannual symposium that addresses timely legal issues in international and comparative law. The symposium usually lasts one to two days and consists of speeches by experts and also panel debates over the issues that the symposium is focused on. Speakers also write articles written on their respective topics that are published in the Law Journal the following year. The 2023 symposium was titled The Legitimacy and Legality of War: From Philosophical Foundations to Emerging Problems which focused on investigating war crimes in the ongoing Russo-Ukrainian War. Past topics include Misinformation/Disinformation and the Law, Internationalism and Sovereignty, and Perspectives on Fighting Human Trafficking.

Coursework offered on international law include European Human Rights Law, Immigration Law, International Business Transactions, International Humanitarian Law, as well as seminar classes where students write long-form academic articles on international law.

=== William C. Wefel Center for Employment Law ===
The Center was founded in 1987 and offers a range of courses addressing the rights and responsibilities of employers and employees, including the prohibition of discrimination; establishment of collective bargaining relationships in the private and public sector; regulation of employee benefits; health and safety in the workplace; and arbitration and mediation of labor and employment disputes. The Center has eight full-time faculty. To obtain a concentration in employment law, students must complete 11 hours of approved coursework in the employment field and write a paper on an employment law topic that has been thoroughly edited and fact-checked, reviewed by an expert faculty member, and has been well-written to a high standard as determined by the faculty member. All students in the concentration take the basic law labor course. Every year, the student-sponsored Employment Law Association and the Center offer a variety of extra-curricular programs for students.

Students involved in the Center have the opportunity to spend a semester in Washington, D.C. working federal agencies such as the Department of Labor, Equal Employment Opportunity Commission (EEOC), and the National Labor Relations Board (NLRB).

=== Clinics ===
Professors and students annually provide more than 36,000 hours of free legal service, totaling an estimated $4+ million, to the community through the School of Law's Legal Clinics and public service programs. The legal clinics offer upper-divisional students practical experience while providing legal services to the community. Students are able to appear in court on cases under Missouri's Student Practice Rule. A full-time faculty member supervises the students.

==== In-house clinics ====
The law school offers five clinics:

- Children's Permanency Clinic, offering legal services on behalf of children and families in Saint Louis with the goal of achieving stability and permanence for the children.
- Civil Advocacy Clinic, offers students opportunities to work on litigation matters with a focus on civil rights issues, consumer protection matters, landlord-tenant disputes, and municipal ordinance violations.
- Criminal Defense Clinic, with the assistance of a full-time social worker, students work to provide a holistic solution to people charged with criminal offenses.
- Entrepreneurship & Community Development Clinic, students provide transactional representation to entrepreneurs, nonprofits community groups, and small businesses.
- Human Rights at Home Litigation Clinic, focusing on securing fundamental human rights for vulnerable populations, students provide legal advice and counseling to clients, draft pleadings, and interact with human rights legal systems such as the U.N. Special Rapporteur.

== Publications ==
=== Law reviews ===
The Law School has two student-edited academic law journals:

- Saint Louis University Law Journal - The Journal is the Law School's flagship law review and its oldest and largest law journal. It publishes four times a year; the General Issue, Teaching Issue, Symposium Issue, and the Childress Issue named after Richard J. Childress, who served as Dean of the Law School for 15 years. The Symposium and Childress Issues are accompanied by academic events hosted at the Law School each year. The students who work on the journal solicit and review articles prior to publishing them. The Journal also publishes an associated Law Journal Online on a rolling basis. The Law Journal Online is host to articles between 2,000 and 6,000 words, making them shorter than the traditional print issues.
- Saint Louis University Journal of Health Law & Policy - The Journal of Health Law and Policy is a specialty journal that is paired with the Law School's Health Law Center. It provides in-depth analyses of topical and developing issues in health law and policy. It publishes twice a year and hosts a spring health law symposium together with the center.

In addition, editorial work on one journal is a faculty-student collaboration, with three faculty editors:

- ABA Journal of Labor & Employment is a specialty journal focusing on labor and employment issues. In 2018 the Law School was chosen by the ABA to become the new editorial home to its labor and employment journal. The journal itself dates back to 1985 and provides discussions of current developments in labor and employment law to aide practicing attorneys, judges, administrators, and the public.

A previous law review:

- From 1981 through 2017 the school published the Saint Louis University Public Law Review. This journal focused on legal issues of public interest and public policy and provided a forum for legal scholars, practicing attorneys, legislators, and public interest advocates to debate topics of public interest law.

=== Other publication ===
- The SLU Law Brief Alumni Magazine is a publication about the law school that is distributed to alumni and supporters with articles written by faculty, alumni, and students.

== Student organizations ==
Saint Louis University School of Law has over 30 student organizations. The organizations are typically student-driven and hold elections where student members can be chosen for leadership positions within the club. The organizations' funding is distributed in part by the law school's student government, the Student Bar Association (SBA). Organizations include:

- American Constitution Society
- Asian American Law Student Association
- Black Law Students' Association
- Business Law Association
- Cannabis Law Society
- Criminal Law Society
- eLaw (Law & Technology)
- Education Law Association
- Environmental Law Society
- Employment Law Association
- Federalist Society
- First Gen Society
- Health Law Association
- Hispanic and Latinx Law Students Association
- If When How: Lawyering for Reproductive Justice
- International Law Students Association (ILSA)
- Middle Eastern and North African Law Students Association
- OUTLaws
- Phi Alpha Delta (PAD)
- Phi Delta Phi (PDP)
- Public Interest Law Group
- Run Club
- Sports and Entertainment Law Association
- Street Law
- Student Animal Legal Defense Fund
- Student Bar Association
- Student Intellectual Property Law Association
- Students for Mental Health and Wellness
- The Tax Club
- Law Students for Veterans Advocacy
- Women Law Students' Association
- J. Reuben Clark Law Society

== Employment ==
The Class of 2021 reported a 90.2% employment rate for graduates with 71.7% obtaining full-time bar passage required employment (i.e., as attorneys) and 18.5% obtaining full-time positions where having a JD was an advantage. 114 graduates stayed in Missouri while the next two most common employment locations were Illinois (22) and California (3)

== Costs ==
The total cost of attendance (indicating the cost of tuition, fees, and living expenses) at the Law School for the 2023-2024 academic year is $71,054 for Full-Time students and $56,990 for Part-Time students. The Law School Transparency estimated debt-financed cost of attendance for three years is $249,077. More than 92% of students received a merit-based scholarship.

== Notable faculty ==
=== Current ===
- George W. Draper III; adjunct professor of trial advocacy. Former chief justice of the Missouri Supreme Court.
- Michael A. Wolff; professor emeritus, dean emeritus. Former chief justice of the Missouri Supreme Court.
- Isaak Dore; professor emeritus. Former human rights officer and former special consultant in the United Nations Division of Human Rights. Awarded honorary doctorate from the University of Orléans, France.

=== Past ===
- Joseph J. Simeone; from 1947 to 1971. Judge for the Missouri Court of Appeals in the Eastern District (1971–1977) and judge for the Missouri Supreme Court (1977–1979).
- Charles B. Blackmar; from 1966 to 1982. Judge on the Missouri Supreme Court from 1982 to 1992, chief justice of the Missouri Supreme Court from 1989 to 1991.
- Francis M. Nevins; from 1971 to 2006.
- Robert J. Henle, S.J.; from 1976 to 1982 he was McDonnell Professor of Justice in American Society; served as president of Georgetown University from 1969 to 1976.
- Michael Joseph Reagan; from 1982 to 1988, also an alum of the Law School. Former federal judge for the Southern District of Illinois.
- Jean Constance Hamilton; from 1986–87 and in 1989. Federal judge for the Eastern District of Missouri from 1990 to 2013 when she assumed senior status.
- Stanisław Frankowski; from 1983 to 2016. Helped found the Center for International and Comparative Law in 1992.
- Thomas Eagleton; from 2005 to 2006. Senator from Missouri (1968–1987), 38th lieutenant governor of Missouri (1965–1968), 35th attorney general of Missouri (1961-1965), briefly the Democratic nominee for vice president under George McGovern in the 1972 presidential election.
- Hauwa Ibrahim; visiting professor 2006. Recipient of the 2004 Sakharov Prize for Freedom of Thought.
- Justin Hansford; from 2011 to 2016. Director of the Thurgood Marshall Civil Rights Center at Howard University School of Law.
- Kevin O'Malley; adjunct professor of Civil Procedure in 2022, also an alum of the Law School. United States ambassador to Ireland from 2014 to 2017.

== Notable alumni ==
=== Federal judges ===
==== United States Court of Appeals, Eighth Circuit ====
- Theodore McMillian; Class of 1949. (deceased). Second Black student to graduate from the Law School after Alphonse Lynch. First Black person to serve on the Saint Louis Circuit Court (1956-1972) and the Missouri Court of Appeals for the Eastern District of Missouri (1972-1978). Nominated by Jimmy Carter August 3, 1978, and confirmed by the Senate September 22, 1978. Assumed Senior Status in 2003 and served in that position until he died in 2006.

==== United States District Court, Eastern District of Missouri ====
- Stephen Robert Clark, Sr.; class of 1991. Nominated by Donald Trump January 23, 2019, and confirmed by the Senate May 22, 2019. Became chief judge for the Eastern District in 2022 and has served in that position since then.
- Henry Edward Autrey; class of 1977. Nominated by George W. Bush March 21, 2002, confirmed by the Senate August 1, 2001, and has served since then.
- Donald Julius Stohr; class of 1958. (deceased). 1960 Republican nominee for Missouri attorney general, losing to Thomas F. Eagleton. First assistant county counselor for St. Louis County from 1963 to 1966. U.S. attorney for the Eastern District of Missouri from 1973 to 1976. Nominated by George H. W. Bush November 14, 1991, and confirmed by the Senate April 13, 1992. Assumed Senior Status in 2006 and died in 2015.
- Edward Louis Filippine; class of 1957. Nominated by Jimmy Carter June 22, 1977, and confirmed by the Senate July 21, 1977. Served as chief judge for the Eastern District from 1990 to 1995 when he assumed Senior Status and has served in that position since then.
- Clyde Sylvester Cahill Jr.; class of 1951. (deceased). Nominated by Jimmy Carter April 2, 1980, and confirmed by the Senate May 21, 1980. Assumed senior status on April 9, 1992, and died on August 18, 2004.

==== United States District Court, Southern District of Illinois ====
- Stephen Patrick McGlynn; class of 1987. Judge for the Illinois Appellate Court, Fifth District (2005-2006), Judge for the Illinois Circuit Court, Twentieth Judicial Circuit (2010-2012, 2013-2020 (short stint in private practice 2012-2013). Nominated by Donald Trump February 4, 2020, confirmed by the Senate September 16, 2020, and has served in that position since then.
- Michael Joseph Reagan; class of 1980. Nominated by Bill Clinton May 11, 2000, and confirmed by the Senate October 3, 2000. Served as chief judge for the Southern District from 2014 to 2019 when he retired.
- Paul E. Riley; class of 1967. (deceased). Nominated by Bill Clinton August 16, 1994, and confirmed by the Senate October 6, 1994. Served until his death in 2001.
- William Donald Stiehl; class of 1949 (LL.B). (deceased). Special assistant attorney general for Illinois (1970-1973). Nominated by Ronald Reagan May 14, 1986, and confirmed by the Senate June 16, 1869. Served as chief judge for the Southern District from 1992 to 1993. Assumed Senior Status in 1996 and served in that position until his death in 2016.
- Omer Poos; class of 1924 (LL.B). (deceased). Nominated by Dwight D. Eisenhower August 16, 1958, and confirmed by the Senate August 19, 1958. Served as chief judge for the Southern District from 1966 to 1972 and assumed Senior Status in 1973 until his death in 1976.

==== United States District Court, Central District of Illinois ====
- Sara Lynn Darrow; class of 1997. Assistant U.S. attorney for the Central District of Illinois (2003-2011). Nominated by Barack Obama January 5, 2011, and confirmed by the Senate August 2, 2011. Serves as chief judge for the Central District since 2019.
- Michael Patrick McCuskey; class of 1975. Chief public defender for Marshall County, Illinois (1976-1988), Judge for the Illinois Circuit Court, Tenth Judicial Circuit (1988-1990), Justice for the Illinois Appellate Court, Third District (1990-1998). Nominated by Bill Clinton July 31, 1997, and confirmed by the Senate April 3, 1998. Served as chief judge for the Central District from 2004-2012 and assumed Senior Status in 2013 until 2014 when he retired.
- Michael Martin Mihm; class of 1967. Nominated by Ronald Reagan July 27, 1982, and confirmed by the Senate August 5, 1982. Served as chief judge for the Central District from 1991-1998. Assumed Senior Status in 2009 and has served in that position since then.

==== United States District Court, Eastern District of Michigan ====
- Stephen Joseph Murphy III; class of 1987. Assistant U.S. attorney for the Eastern District of Michigan (1992-2000). Nominated by George W. Bush April 15, 2008, confirmed by the Senate June 24, 2008, and has served in that position since then.

==== United States District Court, District of South Dakota ====
- Karen Elizabeth Schreier; class of 1981. Nominated by Bill Clinton on March 8, 1999, and confirmed by the Senate June 30, 1999, and has served since. Chief judge for the district from 2006 to 2013.

==== United States District Court, Western District of Arkansas ====
- Hugh Franklin Waters; class of 1964. (deceased). Nominated by Ronald Reagan on August 28, 1981, and confirmed by the Senate October 21, 1981. Served as chief judge for the District from 1981 to 1997 when he assumed senior status. Remained in senior status until his death in 2002.

=== Federal elected officials ===
==== U.S. House of Representatives ====
- Quico Canseco; class of 1975. U.S. representative for Texas's 23rd congressional district from 2011 to 2013.
- Jack Buechner; class of 1965. U.S. representative for Missouri's 2nd congressional district from 1987 to 1991.
- John Berchmans Sullivan; class of 1922. U.S. representative for Missouri's 11th congressional district from 1941 to 1943, 1945 to 1947, and 1949 to 1951.
- Louis Ebenezer Miller; class of 1921. U.S. representative for Missouri's 11th congressional district from 1943 to 1945.
- John Richard Barret; class of 1843. U.S. representative from Missouri's 1st congressional district from 1859 to 1861.

==== U.S. Senate ====
- Eric Schmitt, class of 2000. 43rd attorney general of Missouri from 2019 to 2023 and U.S. senator since 2023.

=== Other federal government ===
- Dana Boente; class of 1982. United States Attorney for the Eastern District of Virginia from 2013 to 2018; Acting attorney general of the United States, from January to February 2017, general counsel of the FBI from January 2018 to June 2020.
- Patrick J. Conroy; class of 1979. 60th chaplain of the United States House of Representatives from May 25, 2011, until January 3, 2021.
- Robert E. Hannegan; class of 1925 (LL.B.). Commissioner of the IRS from 1943 to 1945 and postmaster General of the United States from 1945 to 1947.
- Jeffrey Jensen; class of 1998. United States attorney for the Eastern District of Missouri from 2017 to 2020.
- Ed Martin; class of 1998. Acting U.S. attorney for the District of Columbia, January 20, 2025 – May 14, 2025
- Kevin O'Malley; class of 1973 United States Ambassador to Ireland from 2014 to 2017.
- Stephen Ray Wigginton; class of 1988. United States attorney for the Southern District of Illinois from 2010 to 2015.

=== State government ===
==== Missouri ====
- Joseph P. Teasdale; class of 1960. Governor of Missouri from 1977 to 1981.
- Richard J. Rabbitt; class of 1960. Representative in the Missouri House of Representatives from 1960 to 1976, speaker of the house from 1973 to 1976.
- Michael R. Gibbons; class of 1984. President pro tem of the Missouri Senate from 2005 to 2008.
- Connie L. Johnson; class of 1996. Former member of the Missouri House of Representatives

===== Local/other =====
- Buzz Westfall; class of 1969. County executive of St. Louis County from 1991 to 2003.
- Freeman Bosley Jr.; class of 1979. Mayor of the City of St. Louis from 1993 to 1997.
- Francis G. Slay; class of 1980. Mayor of the City of St. Louis from 2001 to 2017.
- Mariano Favazza; class of 1990. Circuit court clerk of the Missouri Circuit Court from 1999 to 2010.
- Steve Stenger; class of 1996. County executive of St. Louis County, Missouri from January 2015 to April 2019.

==== Illinois ====
- Wyvetter H. Younge; class of 1953. Representative in the Illinois House of Representatives from 1975 until 2008.
- William R. Haine; class of 1974. Illinois state senator for the 56th district from 2002 until 2019.
- James W. Gray, Illinois state legislator and judge.
- Dale A. Righter; class of 1991. Illinois state representative for the 106th district from 1997–2003. Illinois state senator for the 55th district from 2003-2021.

==== Tennessee ====
- Lowe Finney; member of the Tennessee Senate for the 27th district from 2006-2014.

==== Connecticut ====
- Steven Stafstrom; class of 2008. Connecticut state representative since 2015 and serves as the chair of the House Judiciary Committee.

==== Idaho ====
- Ben Ysursa; class of 1974. Secretary of state of Idaho from 2003 to 2015.

=== Other notable alumni ===
- David Merrick; class of 1937. Tony Award-winning theatrical producer.
- Richard Dooling; class of 1987. Novelist and screenwriter best known for his novel White Man's Grave.
- Ben Dogra; class of 1993. Sports agent whose clients include Adrian Peterson, Jonathan Stewart, and Robert Griffin III.
