= Carl Esbeck =

Carl H. Esbeck is the R.B. Price Distinguished Professor and the Isabelle Wade & Paul C. Lyda Professor of Law at the University of Missouri School of Law. He joined the law faculty in 1981. He has published in the areas of church-state relations and civil rights. He has taken the lead in advancing a structural view of the establishment clause of the first amendment, and is also credited as the primary author of the original charitable choice language in the 1996 welfare reform bill.

== Scholarship ==
Professor Esbeck regularly researches and publishes in the areas of religious liberties and civil rights.

=== Representative publications ===
Protestant Dissent and the Virginia Disestablishment, 1776—1786, 7 Georgetown Journal of Law & Public Policy 51 (2009).

The 60th Anniversary of the Everson Decision and America's Church-State Proposition, 23 Journal of Law and Religion 15 (2007–08).

Governance and the Religion Question: Voluntaryism, Disestablishment, and America's Church-State Proposition, 48 Journal of Church & State 202 (Spring 2006)

The Freedom of Faith-Based Organizations to Staff On a Religious Basis, CENTER FOR PUBLIC JUSTICE (Sept, 2004), with Stanley W. Carlson-Thies & Ronald J. Sider.

Dissent and Disestablishment: The Church-State Settlement in the Early American Republic, 2004 BYU Law Review 1385 (2004).

Religious Organizations in the United States, A Study of Identity, Liberty, and the Law, (Carolina Academic Press, 2004). contributed 2 chapters to this book - Regulation of Religious Organizations via Governmental Financial Assistance and Charitable Choice and the Critics.

The Establishment Clause as a Structural Restraint: Validations and Ramifications, 18 JOURNAL OF LAW & POLITICS 445 (2002).

Statement Before the United States House of Representatives Concerning Charitable Choice and the Community Solutions Act, 16 NOTRE DAME JOURNAL OF LAW, ETHICS & PUB. POL'Y 567 (2002).

Differentiating the Free Exercise and Establishment Clauses, 42 Journal of Church and State 311 (2000).

Myths, Miscues and Misconceptions: No-Aid Separationism and the Establishment Clause, 13 NOTRE DAME JOURNAL OF LAW, ETHICS & PUBLIC POLICY 285 (1999).

On Rights and Restraints, 94 LIBERTY 22-29 (March/April 1999).

The Neutral Treatment of Religion and Faith-Based Social Service Providers: Charitable Choice and Its Critics, in WELFARE REFORM AND FAITH-BASED ORGANIZATIONS 173 (Derek Davis & Barry Hankins editors, 1999).

The Establishment Clause as a Structural Restraint on Governmental Power, 84 IOWA L. REV. 1-113 (1998)
