= John C. Holstein =

American judge (1945–2024)

Chief Justice of Missouri
- In office July 1, 1995 – June 30, 1997
- Preceded by: Ann K. Covington
- Succeeded by: Duane Benton

Judge of the Supreme Court of Missouri
- In office October 1989 – 2002
- Appointed by: John Ashcroft
- Preceded by: Warren Dee Welliver
- Succeeded by: Richard B. Teitelman

Personal details
- Born: January 10, 1945 Springfield, Missouri, U.S.
- Died: December 31, 2024 (aged 79) Springfield, Missouri, U.S.
- Spouse: Mary Brummel
- Education: Missouri State University; University of Missouri School of Law; University of Virginia

John Charles Holstein (January 10, 1945 – December 31, 2024) was an American judge of the Supreme Court of Missouri, under an appointment by then-Governor John Ashcroft. From 1995 to 1997, he served as chief justice for the court. In 2002 he retired from the court and returned to private practice in Springfield, Missouri. Holstein received his B.A. in Political Science from Southwest Missouri State University in 1967, and his law degree from the University of Missouri School of Law in 1970. Holstein died on December 31, 2024, at the age of 79.
