= W. Brent Powell =

American judge (born 1970)

Brent Powell

Chief Justice of the Missouri Supreme Court
- Incumbent
- Assumed office July 1, 2025
- Preceded by: Mary Rhodes Russell

Judge of the Missouri Supreme Court
- Incumbent
- Assumed office April 25, 2017
- Appointed by: Eric Greitens
- Preceded by: Richard B. Teitelman

Personal details
- Born: Wesley Brent Powell; July 21, 1970 (age 54); Springfield, Missouri, U.S.
- Spouse: Beth Phillips
- Education: William Jewell College (BA); University of Missouri (JD)

W. Brent Powell (born July 21, 1970) is a judge of the Supreme Court of Missouri.

== Biography ==
Powell received his Bachelor of Arts from William Jewell College and his Juris Doctor from the University of Missouri School of Law in 1996. After graduation from law school he joined the law firm of Lathrop & Gage from 1996 to 1997.

Prior to his judicial service, Powell served as a federal prosecutor for the United States Attorney's Office in the Western District of Missouri for seven years. Powell also served as an assistant prosecuting attorney for the Platte County Prosecutor's Office.

== Judicial career ==
=== State court ===
He was a state trial judge for Division 11 of the Jackson County Circuit Court in Missouri. Powell was appointed by Missouri Governor Matt Blunt on February 15, 2008, and was retained in 2010 and 2016 until his appointment to the Supreme Court.

=== Missouri Supreme Court ===
On March 1, 2017 Powell was named as one of three potential applicants to fill the vacant Supreme Court seat, the other two applicants being Judge Lisa White Hardwick and attorney Benjamin A. Lipman.

On April 25, 2017 Governor Eric Greitens appointed Powell to the Supreme Court to fill the seat left by the death of Richard B. Teitelman.

He was officially sworn in and seated on the court on May 2, 2017.

Powell currently serves as the Chief Justice of the court, and assumed the position on July 1, 2025. He will serve as chief until June 30, 2027

Legal offices
Preceded by Richard B. Teitelman	Judge of the Missouri Supreme Court; 2017–present	Incumbent
Preceded by Mary Rhodes Russell	Chief Justice of the Missouri Supreme Court; 2025–present	Incumbent
