= Warren H. Orr =

American judge

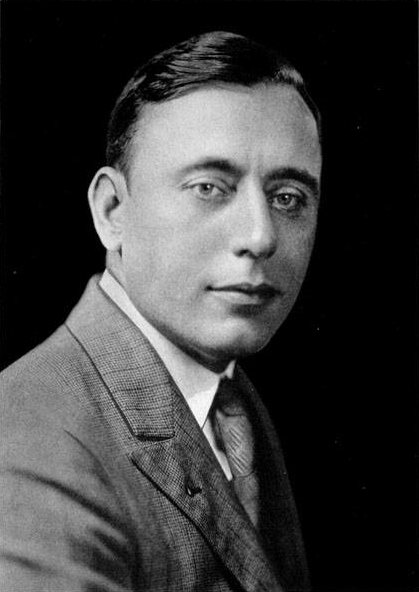
Orr's official photograph, c. 1933.

Warren Henry Orr (November 5, 1888 – January 12, 1962) was an American jurist.

Born in Hannibal, Missouri, Orr received his bachelor's degree from University of Missouri and his law degree from the University of Missouri School of Law. He worked in the newspaper business while in college. Orr was admitted to the Illinois and Missouri bars. He practiced law in Quincy, Illinois, then in Hamilton, Illinois, and Carthage, Illinois. He served as city attorney for Hamilton, Illinois and county judge for Hancock County, Illinois. From 1930 until 1939, Orr served in the Illinois Supreme Court. He then practiced law in Chicago, Illinois and was a Democratic candidate for Governor of Illinois losing to Adlai Stevenson in 1948. Orr died in Evanston, Illinois.
