= Meds & Food for Kids =

US-based nonprofit organization

- Meds & Food for Kids logo
- Formation: 2004
- Founder: Patricia B. Wolff
- Type: Health Charity, 501(c)(3)
- Purpose: Child malnutrition
- Region served: Haiti
- Website: mfkhaiti.org

Meds & Food for Kids (or MFK) is a nonprofit organization dedicated to treating and preventing child malnutrition in Haiti by producing fortified peanut-based foods. Meds & Food for Kids uses a peanut-based feeding approach called Ready-to-Use Therapeutic Food (RUTF), known as Medika Mamba (Haitian Creole for "Peanut Butter Medicine").

== History ==
MFK was founded in 2004 by Pat Wolff, MD, formerly a pediatrician in private practice in St. Louis, Missouri. Wolff first visited Haiti in 1988 with a mission group called the Haiti Project and volunteered at Mother Teresa's homes for dying children and adults. Subsequently, Wolff volunteered in Haiti for fifteen years as a volunteer pediatrician at a village clinic. In March 2011, Wolff left her private practice as a pediatrician to dedicate her time to MFK.

The current C.E.O. is Chris Greene, who succeeded Suzanne Langlois in 2022.

== MFK's Solution ==
=== Ready-to-Use Therapeutic Food (RUTF) ===
Meds & Food for Kids produces a Ready-to-Use Therapeutic Food called "Medika Mamba," or "Peanut Butter Medicine" in Haitian Creole. It is made from a combination of ground peanuts, powdered milk, sugar, oil, and vitamins, does not require refrigeration, and unlike previous treatments for severe acute malnutrition, does not require clean water for preparation. MFK produces "Medika Mamba" in their Cap Haitien factory with Haitian employees, using as many Haitian raw materials as possible. A treatment program for one child lasts six to eight weeks and requires 25 pounds of Medika Mamba. In 2010, MFK joined Nutriset's PlumpyField Network, a global community of independent producers of nutritional solutions for vulnerable populations. Members of the PlumpyField network have access to better machinery and strengthen quality assurance in order to comply with international standards.

=== Agricultural development program ===
In an effort to use Haitian raw materials to produce Medika Mamba whenever possible, MFK started an agricultural development program, working with local peanut farmers to spread knowledge about best practices. The program has two branches, agricultural production assistance and peanut processing. In the peanut production branch, MFK agronomists research and train farmers regarding soil preparation methods, seed and row spacing, and fungicide and herbicide applications. In peanut processing, MFK seeks to find means of successfully monitoring levels of aflatoxin and other contaminants.

=== Research initiatives ===
In December 2011, MFK was awarded with a highly competitive USDA grant from McGovern-Dole Food for Education Program to develop and implement a school snack program through Haiti's National School Lunch Program. In addition, Meds & Food for Kids has partnered with Washington University in St. Louis and Konbit Sante of the Haitian Ministry of Health to conduct a research project testing the supplement Nutributter in an urban slum community in order to best identify strategies to improve upon feeding practices among the ultra-poor.

== Funding ==
MFK is a registered non-profit 501(c)(3) corporation in the United States and a registered Non-governmental Organization in Haiti. It is funded largely by grants as well as by generous corporate sponsors and individual donors from around the world.

== See also ==
- Plumpy'nut
- Aflatoxin
- RUTF
