= Ann K. Covington =

American judge

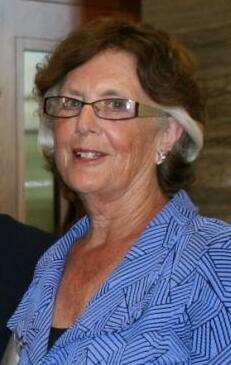
- Covington in 2011

Chief Justice of Missouri
- In office July 1, 1993 – June 30, 1995
- Preceded by: Edward D. Robertson Jr.
- Succeeded by: John C. Holstein

Judge of the Supreme Court of Missouri
- In office December 27, 1988 – 2001
- Appointed by: John Ashcroft
- Preceded by: Robert T. Donnelly
- Succeeded by: Laura Denvir Stith

Personal details
- Born: March 5, 1942 (age 84) Fairmont, West Virginia, U.S.
- Spouse: Charles J. McClain
- Education: Duke University (BA); University of Missouri (JD)

Ann K. Covington (born March 5, 1942) is a former chief justice of the Supreme Court of Missouri. She was the first woman to hold that position. Covington served on the Supreme Court from 1989 to 2001; in 2001 she joined the large St. Louis, Missouri law firm Bryan Cave. Covington is 1963 graduate of Duke University where she received a Bachelor of Arts in English literature. She received her Juris Doctor from the University of Missouri in 1977. She is a native of Fairmont, West Virginia. She lives in Columbia, Missouri.

== See also ==
- List of female state supreme court justices
