= Edward D. Robertson Jr. =

American judge

Edward D. "Chip" Robertson Jr.

Chief Justice of Missouri
- In office July 1, 1991 – June 30, 1993
- Preceded by: Charles Blakey Blackmar
- Succeeded by: Ann K. Covington

Judge of the Supreme Court of Missouri
- In office June 28, 1985 – July 15, 1998
- Appointed by: John Ashcroft
- Preceded by: George F. Gunn Jr.
- Succeeded by: Michael A. Wolff

Personal details
- Born: May 1, 1952 (age 74) Durham, North Carolina, U.S.
- Spouse: Renee Ann Beal
- Education: Westminster College; Southern Methodist University; University of Missouri-Kansas City School of Law; John F. Kennedy School of Government; University of Virginia School of Law

Edward D. "Chip" Robertson Jr. (born May 1, 1952) is a former chief justice of the Supreme Court of Missouri. Robertson was 33 years old when then-Governor John Ashcroft appointed him to serve on the court, and he served from 1985 to 1998. His appointment - Ashcroft's first to the high court - led to claims that the non-partisan Missouri Plan for appointing judges was actually a highly partisan process; twenty years later, Robertson would join opposition to Republican efforts to dismantle the system. In 1998 he left the Supreme Court to join a Kansas City firm which led Missouri's lawsuit against tobacco companies.

== Electoral politics ==
As early as 2005, Robertson was rumored to be mulling a challenge to then-Governor Matt Blunt in the 2008 Republican primary, but ultimately declined.

== Kevin Strickland case ==
In 2021, Robertson's assistance was enlisted to help seek the exoneration of Kevin Strickland, who had spent 43 years in prison despite substantial indications of complete innocence of murders committed in a Kansas City home invasion.
