= William Ray Price Jr. =

American judge

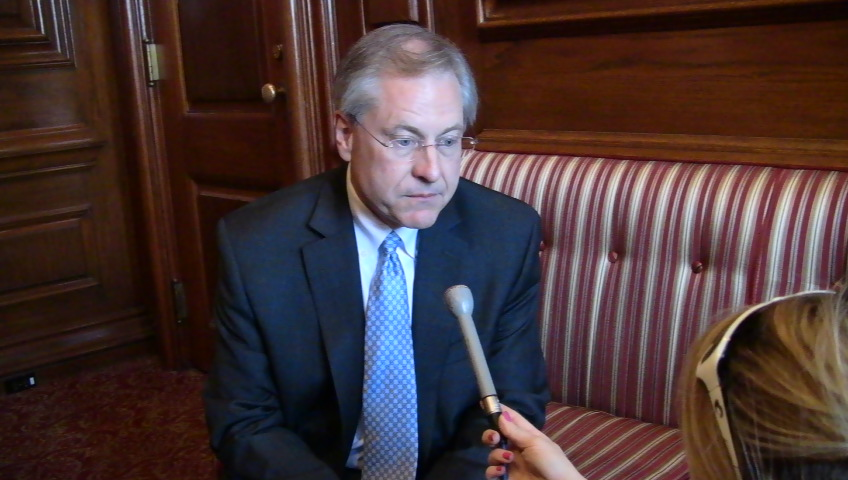

Chairman of the St. Louis County Board of Police Commissioners
- In office November 4, 2019 – March 3, 2021
- Appointed by: Sam Page; St. Louis County Council
- Preceded by: Roland Corvington

Chief Justice of Missouri
- In office July 1, 2009 – June 30, 2011
- Preceded by: Laura Denvir Stith
- Succeeded by: Richard B. Teitelman

Judge of the Supreme Court of Missouri
- In office April 7, 1992 – August 1, 2012
- Appointed by: John Ashcroft
- Preceded by: Charles Blakey Blackmar
- Succeeded by: Paul C. Wilson

Personal details
- Born: January 30, 1952 (age 74) Fairfield, Iowa
- Spouse: Susan Marie Trainor
- Education: University of Iowa; Yale Divinity School; Washington and Lee University

William Ray Price Jr. (born January 30, 1952) is a former judge of the Supreme Court of Missouri and was once its longest-serving Supreme Court member, having served from April 7, 1992, when he was appointed to the Court by then-Governor John Ashcroft, until August 1, 2012, when he retired from the bench. He was retained by a vote of the people of Missouri for twelve-year terms in 1994 and again in 2006. He served two 2-year terms as Chief Justice of the Supreme Court of Missouri from July 1, 1999, to June 30, 2001 and from July 1, 2009, to June 30, 2011. He graduated Phi Beta Kappa and Kappa Sigma from the University of Iowa, attended Yale Divinity School and received his law degree from Washington and Lee University School of Law in 1978. He was in private practice in Kansas City from 1978 to 1992, where he served as a director of Truman Medical Center and president of the Kansas City Board of Police Commissioners. Since retiring from the bench, he has joined the law firm of Armstrong Teasdale LLP in its St. Louis office.
