= Center for the Study of Dispute Resolution =

The Center for the Study of Dispute Resolution (CSDR) is a research center under the University of Missouri School of Law to develop and promote:

- Appropriate methods for understanding, managing and resolving domestic and international conflict.
- The use of dispute resolution techniques to enhance informed decisionmaking.

== Overview ==
The CSDR offers the following two degrees as a part of its curriculum:

- Master of Laws in Dispute Resolution
- LL.M. students can earn dual degrees (MA and PhD) from the School of Journalism.

Students who already have a law degree (either a J.D. from an ABA-accredited law school, or a LL.B. from a school outside the United States) may receive their LL.M. in Dispute Resolution from the University of Missouri. Students must complete 24 Credit hours, 15 of which must be in Dispute Resolution. These 15 hours include the 16 hours that students earn from required coursework in Arbitration, Research, Methods for Evaluating Dispute Resolution Systems, Non-Binding Dispute Resolution, and Understanding Conflict.

The University of Missouri School of Law was the first law school in United States to offer an LL.M. that is exclusively focused on Dispute Resolution, and consistently ranks as one of the top law schools offering Dispute Resolution programs in the United States.

== Students ==
The CSDR regularly takes onboard students of various backgrounds from across the world. Though the LL.M. in Dispute Resolution program is primarily intended for lawyers, CSDR also accepts applicants who are non lawyers, but otherwise have bachelor's degrees and substantial alternative dispute resolution experience.

== Research ==
The University of Missouri Columbia School of Law in conjunction with the Center for the Study of Dispute Resolution publishes The Journal of Dispute Resolution on a semi-annual basis (December and May).
