= Education and training of electrical and electronics engineers =

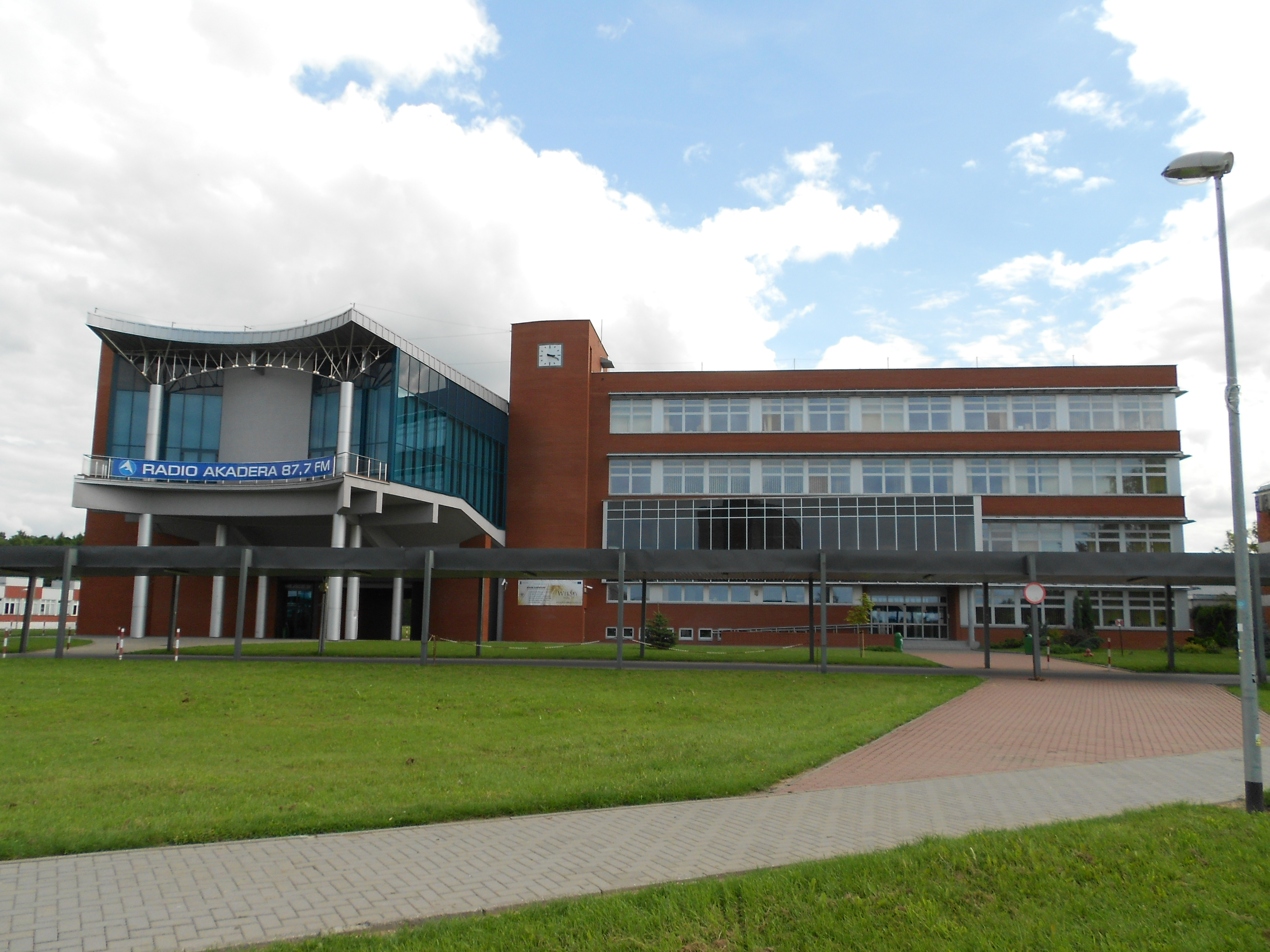
Faculty of Electrical Engineering at Bialystok Technical University, Poland.

Both electrical and electronics engineers typically possess an academic degree with a major in electrical/electronics engineering. The length of study for such a degree is usually three or four years and the completed degree may be designated as a Bachelor of Engineering, Bachelor of Science or Bachelor of Applied Science depending upon the university.

== Scope of undergraduate education ==
The degree generally includes units covering physics, mathematics, project management and specific topics in electrical and electronics engineering. Initially such topics cover most, if not all, of the sub fields of electrical engineering. Students then choose to specialize in one or more sub fields towards the end of the degree. In most countries, a bachelor's degree in engineering represents the first step towards certification and the degree program itself is certified by a professional body. After completing a certified degree program the engineer must satisfy a range of requirements (including work experience requirements) before being certified. Once certified the engineer is designated the title of Professional Engineer (in the United States and Canada), Chartered Engineer (in the United Kingdom, Ireland, India, Pakistan, South Africa and Zimbabwe), Chartered Professional Engineer (in Australia) or European Engineer (in much of the European Union).

== Post graduate studies ==
Electrical engineers can also choose to pursue a postgraduate degree such as a master of engineering, a doctor of philosophy in engineering or an engineer's degree. The master and engineer's degree may consist of either research, coursework or a mixture of the two. The doctor of philosophy consists of a significant research component and is often viewed as the entry point to academia. In the United Kingdom and various other European countries, the master of engineering is often considered an undergraduate degree of slightly longer duration than the bachelor of engineering.

== Typical electrical/electronics engineering undergraduate syllabus ==
Apart from electromagnetics and network theory, other items in the syllabus are particular to electronics engineering course. Electrical engineering courses have other specializations such as machines, power generation and distribution. Note that the following list does not include the large quantity of mathematics (maybe apart from the final year) included in each year's study.

=== Electromagnetics ===
Elements of vector calculus: divergence and curl; Gauss' and Stokes' theorems, Maxwell's equations: differential and integral forms. Wave equation, Poynting vector. Plane waves: propagation through various media; reflection and refraction; phase and group velocity; skin depth. Transmission lines: characteristic impedance; impedance transformation; Smith chart; impedance matching; pulse excitation. Waveguides: modes in rectangular waveguides; boundary conditions; cut-off frequencies; dispersion relations. Antennas: Dipole antennas; antenna arrays; radiation pattern; reciprocity theorem, antenna gain. Additional basic fundamental in electrical are to be study

=== Network theory ===
Network graphs: matrices associated with graphs; incidence, fundamental cut set and fundamental circuit matrices. Solution methods: nodal and mesh analysis. Network theorems: superposition, Thevenin and Norton's maximum power transfer, Wye-Delta transformation. Steady state sinusoidal analysis using phasors. Linear constant coefficient differential equations; time domain analysis of simple RLC circuits, Solution of network equations using Laplace transform: frequency domain analysis of RLC circuits. 2-port network parameters: driving point and transfer functions. State equations.

=== Electronic devices and circuits ===
Electronic Devices: Energy bands in silicon, intrinsic and extrinsic silicon. Carrier transport in silicon: diffusion current, drift current, mobility, resistivity. Generation and recombination of carriers. p-n junction diode, Zener diode, tunnel diode, BJT, JFET, MOS capacitor, MOSFET, LED, p-I-n and avalanche photo diode, LASERs. Device technology: integrated circuits fabrication process, oxidation, diffusion, ion implantation, photolithography, n-tub, p-tub and twin-tub CMOS process.

Analog Circuits: Equivalent circuits (large and small-signal) of diodes, BJTs, JFETs, and MOSFETs, Simple diode circuits, clipping, clamping, rectifier. Biasing and bias stability of transistor and FET amplifiers. Amplifiers: single-and multi-stage, differential, operational, feedback and power. Analysis of amplifiers; frequency response of amplifiers. Simple op-amp circuits. Filters. Sinusoidal oscillators; criterion for oscillation; single-transistor and op-amp configurations. Function generators and wave-shaping circuits. Power supplies.

Digital circuits: Boolean algebra, minimization of Boolean functions; logic gates digital IC families (DTL, TTL, ECL, MOS, CMOS). Combinational circuits: arithmetic circuits, code converters, multiplexers and decoders. Sequential circuits: latches and flip-flops, counters and shift-registers. Sample and hold circuits, ADCs, DACs. Semiconductor memories. Microprocessor (8085): architecture, programming, memory and I/O interfacing.

=== Signals and systems ===
Definitions and properties of Laplace transform, continuous-time and discrete-time Fourier series, continuous-time and discrete-time Fourier Transform, z-transform. Sampling theorems. Linear Time-Invariant Systems: definitions and properties; casualty, stability, impulse response, convolution, poles and zeros frequency response, group delay, phase delay. Signal transmission through LTI systems. Random signals and noise: probability, random variables, probability density function, autocorrelation, power spectral density.

=== Control systems ===
Control system components; block diagrammatic description, reduction of block diagrams. Open loop and closed loop (feedback) systems and stability analysis of these systems. Signal flow graphs and their use in determining transfer functions of systems; transient and steady state analysis of LTI control systems and frequency response. Tools and techniques for LTI control system analysis: root loci, Routh-Hurwitz criterion, Bode and Nyquist plots. Control system compensators: elements of lead and lag compensation, elements of Proportional-Integral-Derivative control. State variable representation and solution of state equation of LTI control systems.

=== Communications ===
Communication systems: amplitude and angle modulation and demodulation systems, spectral analysis of these operations, superheterodyne receivers; elements of hardware, realizations of analog communication systems; signal-to-noise ratio calculations for amplitude modulation (AM) and frequency modulation (FM) for low noise conditions. Digital communication systems: pulse code modulation, differential pulse-code modulation, delta modulation; digital modulation schemes-amplitude, phase and frequency shift keying schemes, matched filter receivers, bandwidth consideration and probability of error calculations for these schemes.

== Certification ==
The advantages of certification vary depending upon location. For example, in the United States and Canada "only a licensed engineer may...seal engineering work for public and private clients". This requirement is enforced by state and provincial legislation such as Quebec's Engineers Act. In other countries, such as Australia, no such legislation exists. Practically all certifying bodies maintain a code of ethics that they expect all members to abide by or risk expulsion. In this way these organizations play an important role in maintaining ethical standards for the profession. Even in jurisdictions where certification has little or no legal bearing on work, engineers are subject to contract law. In cases where an engineer's work fails he or she may be subject to the tort of negligence and, in extreme cases, the charge of criminal negligence. An engineer's work must also comply with numerous other rules and regulations such as building codes and legislation pertaining to environmental law.

Significant professional bodies for electrical engineers include the Institute of Electrical and Electronics Engineers and the Institution of Engineering and Technology. The former claims to produce 30 percent of the world's literature on electrical engineering, has over 360,000 members worldwide and holds over 300 conferences annually. The latter publishes 14 journals, has a worldwide membership of 120,000, certifies Chartered Engineers in the United Kingdom and claims to be the largest professional engineering society in Europe.

== See also ==
- Engineering education
- List of electrical engineering journals
