= Michael A. Wolff =

American judge

Judge of the Supreme Court of Missouri
- In office 1998 – August 11, 2011
- Appointed by: Mel Carnahan
- Preceded by: Edward D. Robertson Jr.
- Succeeded by: George W. Draper III

Chief Justice of Missouri
- In office July 1, 2005 – June 30, 2007
- Preceded by: Ronnie L. White
- Succeeded by: Laura Denvir Stith

Personal details
- Born: April 1, 1945 (age 81) La Crosse, Wisconsin
- Spouse: Patricia B. Wolff
- Education: Dartmouth College; University of Minnesota Law School

Michael A. Wolff (born April 1, 1945) is the dean emeritus of Saint Louis University School of Law and a former Chief Justice of the Supreme Court of Missouri.

== Early life and education ==
Wolff earned his undergraduate degree from Dartmouth College, and his law degree from the University of Minnesota Law School. He married Pat Wolff, a St. Louis pediatrician who worked to combat childhood malnutrition in Haiti.

== Career ==
Wolff served on the Supreme Court of Missouri from 1998 to 2011, and as chief justice from 2005 to 2007. Prior to his appointment the Court, he served as chief counsel to the office of Governor Mel Carnahan from 1993 to 1994, and as special counsel from 1994 to 1998. From 1975 to 1993, and again from 2011 to 2013, he served as a law professor at Saint Louis University School of Law.

Party political offices
| Preceded by Richard P. Beard | Democratic nominee for Missouri Attorney General; 1988 | Succeeded by Jay Nixon |
