= Mariano Favazza =

American circuit court clerk (born 1952)

Mariano V. Favazza (20 December 1952) is the former Circuit Court Clerk of the Missouri Circuit Court, Twenty Second Judicial Circuit, City of St. Louis.

== Education ==
Favazza graduated from Saint Louis University School of Law, cum laude.

== Time as Circuit Clerk ==
He was elected to the position in 1998. During his tenure, he has updated the Circuit Clerk's office to bring it more up to date. He fought to have public court records displayed online.

In 2009, Favazza has helped end attempted legislation that would have made the office of the Circuit Clerk appointed, despite a vote by the people of the City of St. Louis to keep it an elected position. He has also filed a lawsuit against the Circuit Court Budget Committee in order to protect the powers provided the office by the Missouri Constitution. The Missouri Constitution provides that "[u]pon the expiration of the terms of office of the clerk of the circuit court for criminal causes of the city of St. Louis, and the term of the clerk of the St. Louis court of criminal correction, the offices of such clerks shall cease to exist and thereafter the clerk of the circuit court of the city of St. Louis shall have the powers and perform the duties and functions of such clerks and shall serve all divisions of the circuit court, except the courts presided over by an associate circuit judge, the judge of the probate division of the circuit court and by municipal judges." The Circuit Court Budget Committee has attempted to give that power to the presiding judge. Both Favazza and the judges have appealed the decision of the trial court. The appeal is currently pending.

In August 2010, Favazza lost the seat to Jane Schweitzer. Favazza ended his time in the Circuit Clerks position saving the city millions of dollars and creating many programs to make St. Louis safer.

== After politics ==
Favazza is currently working as a lawyer in St. Louis.
