= Clinical Pediatrics =

- Discipline: Pediatrics
- Language: English
- Edited by: Brian S. Carter

Publication details
- History: 1962–present
- Publisher: SAGE Publications
- Frequency: Monthly
- Impact factor: 1.383 (2018)

Standard abbreviations
- ISO 4: Clin. Pediatr.

Indexing
- CODEN: CPEDAM
- ISSN: 0009-9228 (print); 1938-2707 (web)
- LCCN: 68003710
- OCLC no.: 879341

Links
- Journal homepage; Online access; Online archive

Clinical Pediatrics is a peer-reviewed medical journal of pediatrics that was established in 1962. It is published monthly by SAGE Publications and edited by Brian S. Carter.

== Scope ==
Clinical Pediatrics is a medical journal that seeks to publish and to accessible information on a variety of child-centered care topics including those of a clinical, scientific, behavioral, educational, or ethical nature.

== Abstracting and indexing ==
Clinical Pediatrics is abstracted and indexed in, among other databases: SCOPUS, and the Social Sciences Citation Index. According to the Journal Citation Reports, its 2018 impact factor is 1.383, ranking it 78 out of 125 journals in the category 'Pediatrics'.
