= University of Missouri School of Law =

Public law school in Columbia, Missouri, US

Coordinates: 38.9440°N 92.3283°W

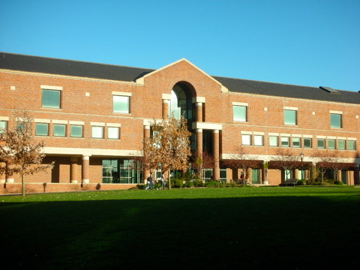
- Hulston Hall is home to the University of Missouri School of Law.
- Motto: Salus Populi (Latin)
- Parent school: University of Missouri
- Established: 1872
- School type: Public
- Parent endowment: US $1.0 billion
- Location: Columbia, Missouri, U.S.
- Enrollment: 346
- Faculty: 41 (Fall); 48 (Spring)
- USNWR ranking: 57th (tie) (2025)
- Bar pass rate: 91.4% (Mizzou Law Pass Rate, 2018); 82.4% (Missouri Avg. Pass Rate, 2018)
- Website: law.missouri.edu
- ABA profile: Profile

The University of Missouri School of Law (Mizzou Law or MU Law) is the law school of the University of Missouri. It is located on the university's main campus in Columbia. The school was founded in 1872 by the Curators of the University of Missouri. Its alumni include governors, legislators, judges, attorneys general, and law professors across the country. According to Mizzou Law's 2016 ABA-required disclosures, 82 percent of the 2016 class obtained full-time, long-term, JD-required employment nine months after graduation.

== Overview ==
The Center for the Study of Dispute Resolution (CSDR) is Mizzou Law's only research center. The School also offers a Certificate in Dispute Resolution to its J.D. candidates, and a LL.M. for those who have already completed law school.

The median LSAT score for the incoming class of 2016 was 158, with a median GPA of 3.48. It accepted 58% of its applicants. Its student body total was 324 during the 2014-2015 school year. The law school also has a historical bar passage rate around 90.8%, which is higher than the Missouri state average of 86%. At graduation, roughly half of its students have secured employment for after the bar; 9 months after graduation around 95% of all students are employed.

In the annual ranking of "Scholarly Impact Score," the Mizzou Law faculty was ranked 54. The score is calculated from the mean and median of total law journal citations over the past five years to the work of tenured faculty members.

== Degree programs ==
=== J.D. degree ===
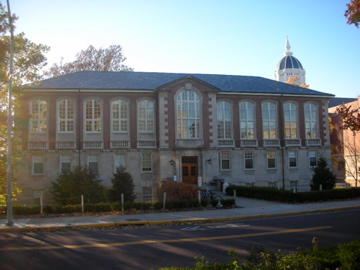
Tate Hall housed the School of Law from 1923 to 1988.

Students must complete 89 credit hours in order to receive a Juris Doctor (J.D.) from the University of Missouri. Students may apply up to 3 hours of non-law school coursework towards their degree in some circumstances. Students may also apply up to 31 hours of legal coursework completed at another ABA-accredited law school.

Additionally, all students must attend several presentations beyond their regular classes. These presentations qualify for "Professional Perspectives" or "Career Perspectives" credit, depending on the nature of the lecture and whether the Dean's office or the Office of Career Development sponsors the presentation. These presentations are usually hosted by student organizations.

Students also must complete a "Writing Requirement," in which the student conducts original research and drafts a paper on that issue.

=== LL.M. in Dispute Resolution ===
The Master of Law (LL.M.) in Dispute Resolution program at University of Missouri School of Law is offered by the Center for the Study of Dispute Resolution. The University of Missouri School of Law is the first law school in United States to offer an LL.M. that is exclusively focused on Dispute Resolution, and consistently ranks as one of the top law schools offering Dispute Resolution programs in the United States. Students who already have a law degree (either a J.D. from an ABA-accredited law school, or a LL.B. from a school outside the United States) may receive their LL.M. in Dispute Resolution from the University of Missouri. Students must complete 24 credit hours, 15 of which must be in Dispute Resolution.

== Academic programs ==
=== Certificates ===
The School of Law also has affiliations with other schools and programs at the university, whereby the student earns a certificate from another school:

- Center for the Digital Globe - an interdepartmental certificate, established by the College of Business, School of Journalism, School of Law, and Department of Textile and Apparel Management in the College of Human Environmental Sciences with a focus on the "managerial, theoretical and policy-related issues associated with digital media, electronic commerce and globalization;"
- European Union Graduate Certificate from the European Union Center, established by the European Union to "develop a better understanding of the EU by individuals, businesses and governmental entities;" and
- Certificate in Journalism from the Missouri School of Journalism.

=== Clinics and externships ===
Mizzou Law offers five clinics:

- Criminal Prosecution Clinic;
- Entrepreneurship Legal Clinic;
- Innocence Clinic;
- Mediation Clinic; and
- Veterans Clinic.

Students may also perform an externship for up to 3 hours of credit. Externships are only permitted in public law offices, government offices, and not-for-profit offices.

=== Study Abroad ===
The University of Missouri accepts credits earned from all ABA-approved law schools and study abroad programs. It also runs its own study abroad programs.

- South Africa Program – students take a comparative law class and study dispute resolution in an international context.
- London Consortium – students take American and British law courses. Partnered with the University of Iowa College of Law.

== Rankings ==
- U.S. News & World Report ranked Mizzou Law 61st out of 196 among American law schools overall in their 2024 rankings.
- U.S. News also ranked Mizzou Law 3rd out of 67 nationally among law schools in Dispute Resolution in their 2024 rankings
- In 2017, the school was recognized and ranked 21st by The National Jurist and preLaw Magazine as one of the nation's best valued law schools.

== Journals ==
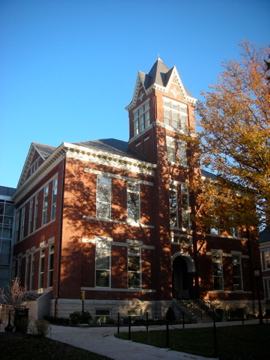
The Law Barn was the center of legal studies at the University of Missouri from 1893 to 1923.

The law school has a unique method for selecting associates to its three law journals. Unlike other schools that base placement entirely on grades, the University of Missouri School of Law uses a write-on system. After final exams in the spring semester are completed, packets are made available to all interested students. In the packet are two assignments: the first is a case and exclusive list of citations to other sources; and the second is a mock list of footnotes. Applicants to the law journals must write a case note based on the case in the packet, using as citations only those sources specifically listed. Applicants must also edit the mock list of footnotes for errors, pursuant to the Bluebook method of citation. Applicants must then return the entire packet, as well as a list identifying their preferred law journals.

The Editors-in-Chief and other editors blind-grade the submissions. Law school administrative assistants rank each student three times: first, by weighting the applicants' GPAs at 80% and their written submissions 20%; then, by weighting the GPAs at 20% and the written submissions at 80%; lastly, by ranking solely based on the scores of the written submissions. The Editors-in-Chief then select which applicants they want. The Missouri Law Review selects first based on the 80/20 rankings, then the Journal of Dispute Resolution, then the Business, Entrepreneurship & Tax Law Review (formerly the Journal of Environmental and Sustainability Law). Then, they pick again in order, this time based on the 20/80 rankings, and finally they select based on the 0/100 rankings.

=== Missouri Law Review ===
The Missouri Law Review is the law school's oldest law journal. It is entirely student-run and student-edited and publishes four times a year. Since 1936, when publication began, it has been cited over sixteen hundred times in published court opinions, including over twenty occasions by the Supreme Court of the United States.

Each spring the law review hosts a symposium on a different part of the law. Noted scholars and practitioners in the given area give a presentation, and then they write an article which the law review publishes later that year.

=== Business, Entrepreneurship & Tax Law Review ===
The Business, Entrepreneurship & Tax Law Review ("BETR") is a student-edited and led publication that creates a three-part publication and hosts an annual symposium providing information and legal analysis over a wide range of issues.

=== Journal of Dispute Resolution ===
The Journal of Dispute Resolution, operated by the Center for the Study of Dispute Resolution, is entirely student-led and student-edited. Published semi-annually, the Journal is considered the leading publication in alternative dispute resolution. The Journal, like the Missouri Law Review, hosts annual symposia in the area of dispute resolution.

=== Journal of Environmental and Sustainability Law ===
The Journal of Environmental and Sustainability Law, or JESL, formerly known as the Missouri Environmental Law & Policy Review, was a joint venture between the School of Law and the Missouri Bar Association. Founded in 1993, JESL consisted of 11 student editors and no more than 20 student associates.

JESL published case notes and articles on topics including energy policy, land use, water policy, agricultural law, land reclamation, and environmental sustainability. From its inception in 1993 to the 2010-2011 school year, it published three editions each year. Beginning in the 2011-2012 school year, two issues per year are published, one each in the fall and spring. The journal's last issue was published in spring 2016.

== Employment ==
According to Mizzou Law's official 2016 ABA-required disclosures, 82% of the Class of 2016 obtained full-time, long-term, JD-required employment nine months after graduation. Mizzou Law's Law School Transparency under-employment score is 17.7%, indicating the percentage of the Class of 2016 unemployed, pursuing an additional degree, or working in a non-professional, short-term, or part-time job nine months after graduation.

== Costs ==
For the 2019-2020 school year, in-state tuition was $22,218.95, and out-of-state tuition was $41,079.35. The total cost of attendance (indicating the cost of tuition, fees, and living expenses) at Mizzou Law for the 2014-2015 academic year was $55,106 for non-Missouri residents and $34,476.30 for Missouri residents. The Law School Transparency estimated debt-financed cost of attendance for three years was $212,935 for non-Missouri residents and $143,714 for Missouri residents.

== Notable faculty ==
- Royce de Rohan Barondes (contracts & business organizations)
- Dennis D. Crouch (patent law)
- Carl Esbeck (religious liberties)
- David Gamage (tax law and health law)
- Michael Middleton
- Elwood L. Thomas – former professor; later a judge on the Supreme Court of Missouri
- S.I. Strong (private international law)
- Dale A. Whitman (property law)

== Notable alumni ==
=== Judiciary ===
- Howard L. Bickley, Chief Justice of the New Mexico Supreme Court
- William H. Billings, former Chief Justice of the Supreme Court of Missouri
- Patricia Breckenridge, Judge of the Supreme Court of Missouri
- Ann K. Covington, former Chief Justice of the Supreme Court of Missouri
- John C. Holstein, former Chief Justice of the Supreme Court of Missouri
- Ted Kulongoski, former Governor of Oregon & former Justice of the Oregon Supreme Court
- Nanette K. Laughrey, first female United States District Judge for the Western District of Missouri
- Stephen N. Limbaugh Sr., former U.S. District Judge for both the Eastern and Western Districts of Missouri
- John Watkins Oliver, United States District Judge
- Warren H. Orr, Chief Justice of the Illinois Supreme Court
- Beth Phillips, United States District Judge, Western District of Missouri
- W. Brent Powell, Judge of the Supreme Court of Missouri
- Mary Rhodes Russell, Judge of the Supreme Court of Missouri

=== Politicians ===
- Camille Bennett, Democratic member of the Arkansas House of Representatives from Lonoke, Arkansas, service since 2015
- Clarence Cannon, Democratic Congress member
- Mel Carnahan, former Governor of Missouri
- Russ Carnahan, former congressman from Missouri's 3rd congressional district and chair of the Missouri Democratic Party
- Forrest C. Donnell, former Governor of Missouri & former U.S. Senator
- Politte Elvins, former Republican Congressman from Missouri's 13th congressional district
- Warren E. Hearnes, former Governor of Missouri & former Missouri Secretary of State
- Chris Koster, former Attorney General of Missouri
- Claire McCaskill, former U.S. Senator from Missouri
- Jeremiah "Jay" Nixon, former Governor of Missouri
- Guy Brasfield Park, former Governor of Missouri
- Ike Skelton, former United States Congressman from Missouri
- Harold Volkmer, former United States Congressman
- Andrew Bailey, Attorney General of Missouri (2023-Present)

=== Public figures ===
- Lloyd L. Gaines, civil rights activist and plaintiff in Missouri ex rel. Gaines v. Canada
- David Limbaugh, political commentator and author
- Rush Limbaugh Sr. (attended), longtime attorney and patriarch of the Limbaugh family
- Mark Twain (Samuel L. Clemens), author, received an honorary degree

== Student organizations ==
- American Bar Association – Law Student Division
- American Constitution Society (ASC)
- Asian American Law Students Association (AALSA)
- Association of Intellectual Property and Entertainment Law (AIPEL)
- Black Law Students Association (BLSA)
- Board of Advocates (BOA)
- Christian Legal Society (CLS)
- Disabled and Allied Students Association (DALSA)
- The Federalist Society (Fed Soc)
- Health Law Society (HLS)
- Hispanic Law Students Association (HLSA)
- J. Reuben Clark Law Society
- Missouri Law Veterans Society (MLVS)
- OUTLaw
- Phi Alpha Delta Law Fraternity (PAD)
- Phi Delta Phi (Tiedeman Inn)
- Public Interest Law Association
- Real Estate Law Society
- Sports Law Society
- Student Bar Association (SBA)
- Tax and Transactional Law Society (TTLS)
- Women's Law Association (WLA)
