= Missouri Court of Appeals =

Intermediate appellate court of Missouri

Court locations

The Missouri Court of Appeals is the intermediate appellate court for the state of Missouri. The court handles most of the appeals from the Missouri Circuit Courts. The court is divided into three geographic districts: Eastern (based in St. Louis), Western (based in Kansas City), and Southern (based in Springfield). For example, appeals taken from trials in St. Louis County will go to the Eastern District, and appeals taken from trials in Jackson County (Kansas City) will go to the Western District.

After a case is decided in the Court of Appeals, the losing party may choose to accept the result, or to appeal further to the Supreme Court of Missouri. In most appeals, the Supreme Court of Missouri may, and often does, reject an appeal from the Court of Appeals (called "discretionary jurisdiction"). Historically, less than ten percent of the appeals heard by the Missouri Court of Appeals are transferred to the Supreme Court. Thus, for the vast majority of appeals, the Court of Appeals decision is final.

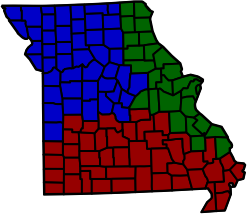
The Eastern District, in green, is based in St. Louis. The Western District, in blue, is based in Kansas City. The Southern District, in red, is based in Springfield.

== Jurisdiction ==
The Missouri Court of Appeals has jurisdiction over all appeals which do not fall under the exclusive jurisdiction of the Supreme Court of Missouri. The five categories of appeals over which the Supreme Court exercises exclusive jurisdiction are:

- The validity of a United States statute or treaty.
- The validity of a Missouri statute or constitutional provision.
- The state's revenue laws.
- Challenges to a statewide elected official's right to hold office.
- Imposition of the death penalty.

Therefore, if an appeal falls within one of these five categories, the appeal must go directly to the Missouri Supreme Court. If an appeal does not fall within one of these five categories, the Missouri Court of Appeals may hear the case.

== Opinions ==
The Missouri court of appeals functions by issuing written judicial opinions. These opinions create precedent for future cases within all of Missouri, not only within a district.

Most of these opinions are available to the public. Aside from "memorandum opinions," the court publishes the opinions to its website when they are issued.

== Judges ==
There are fourteen judges in the Eastern District, eleven judges in the Western District, and seven judges in the Southern District. Judges are selected via the Missouri Plan. Often, a district will have fewer judges than normal because of a vacancy, which occurs after a sitting judge leaves the Court and before a new judge can be appointed.

Under the Constitution of Missouri, Court of Appeals judges must be at least 30 years old, licensed to practice law in Missouri, a United States citizen for at least 15 years, a qualified voter of the state for nine years preceding selection, and a resident of the appellate district in which the judge serves. Judges serve a term of twelve years, but may seek additional terms. Mandatory retirement age for judges is 70, after which a judge may elect to go on senior status.

=== Current judges ===
==== Eastern District (St. Louis) ====
Name	Start	Appointer	Term End
Thomas Clark, Chief Judge	2021	Mike Parson (R)	2034
Michael Gardner	2020	Mike Parson (R)	2034
Virginia Lay	2024	Mike Parson (R)	2026
Gary Gaertner	2009	Jay Nixon (D)	2036
Robert Clayton	2011	Jay Nixon (D)	2036
Angela Quigless	2012	Jay Nixon (D)	2026
Philip Hess	2013	Jay Nixon (D)	2028
James Dowd	2015	Jay Nixon (D)	2028
Lisa Page	2015	Jay Nixon (D)	2030
John Torbitzky	2021	Mike Parson (R)	2034
Rebeca Navarro-McKelvey	2024	Mike Parson (R)	2026
Renee Hardin-Tammons	2022	Mike Parson (R)	2036
Michael Wright	2023	Mike Parson (R)	2036

==== Western District (Kansas City) ====
Name	Start	Chief Term	Appointer	Term End
Anthony Gabbert, Chief Judge	2013	2024–present	Jay Nixon (D)	2026
Lisa White Hardwick	2001	2010–2012	Bob Holden (D)	2026
Alok Ahuja	2007	2014–2016	Matt Blunt (R)	2034
Karen King Mitchell	2009	2018–2020	Jay Nixon (D)	2034
Cynthia Martin	2009	2020–2022	Jay Nixon (D)	2036
Gary Witt	2010	2022–2024	Jay Nixon (D)	2036
Mark Pfeiffer	2009	2016–2018	Jay Nixon (D)	2034
Edward Ardini	2016	–	Jay Nixon (D)	2030
Thomas Chapman	2018	–	Mike Parson (R)	2032
Douglas Thomson	2020	–	Mike Parson (R)	2034
Janet Sutton	2021	–	Mike Parson (R)	2036

==== Southern District (Springfield) ====
Name	Start	Appointer	Term End
Jack Goodman, Chief Judge	2020	Mike Parson (R)	2034
Jeffrey Bates	2003	Bob Holden (D)	2030
Don Burrell	2008	Matt Blunt (R)	2034
Bryan Nickell	2025	Mike Kehoe (R)	2026
Becky West	2022	Mike Parson (R)	2036
Jennifer Growcock	2022	Mike Parson (R)	2036
Matt Hamner	2024	Mike Parson (R)	2026

== Courthouses ==
=== Eastern District (St. Louis) ===
The Missouri Court of Appeals, Eastern District, is located in the historic Old Post Office building in downtown St. Louis. The address is One Post Office Square, 815 Olive Street, Room 304, St. Louis, Missouri 63101.

=== Western District (Kansas City) ===
The Missouri Court of Appeals, Western District is located in its own courthouse in downtown Kansas City. The courthouse—built in 1982—is the state's only intermediate appellate courthouse. The address is 1300 Oak Street, Kansas City, Missouri 64106-2970.

=== Southern District (Springfield) ===
The Missouri Court of Appeals, Southern District, is located in the Hammons Building in Springfield, Missouri. The address is 300 Hammons Parkway, Springfield, Missouri 65806.
