= Vince Gunter =

American lawyer

Vincent E. Gunter is an attorney from Missouri. He was enlisted in the Navy and later became an Army captain. He is a veteran of the Iraq War where he served in the United States Army Judge Advocate General's Corps. He is a recipient of the Bronze Star, and gave an introductory speech for Barack Obama in Independence, Missouri.

Gunter earned his B.A. at University of Missouri-Kansas City and his Juris Doctor with Distinction from the University of Missouri-Kansas City School of Law. Prior to his career in the JAG Corps, Gunter clerked for Judge Richard E. Dorr of the United States District Court for the Western District of Missouri.
