= Burnett v. National Association of Realtors =

Lawsuit over real estate commission fees

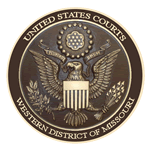
- Court: United States District Court for the Western District of Missouri
- Full case name: Rhonda Burnett, et al. v. the National Association of Realtors, Realogy Holdings Corp., HomeServices of America, Inc., BHH Affiliates, LLC, HSF Affiliates, LLC, RE/MAX LLC, and Keller Williams Realty, Inc.
- Started: October 16, 2023
- Decided: October 31, 2023; 17 months ago
- Docket nos.: 4:19-cv-00332
- Verdict: All defendants were found liable for damages caused by engaging in a price-fixing conspiracy that required home sellers to pay more for real estate brokerage services.

Court membership
- Judge sitting: Stephen R. Bough

Laws applied
- Sherman Antitrust Act

Keywords
- Anti-competitive practices; Cartels; Conspiracy; Price fixing; Real estate

Burnett v. National Association of Realtors (formerly Sitzer v. National Association of Realtors) is a class-action lawsuit challenging the fees charged by real estate agents in the United States. The case was filed against the National Association of Realtors and some of the largest brokerages in the country. At trial, a federal jury found that they violated antitrust law by conspiring to force home sellers to pay inflated commissions to real estate agents.

== Background ==
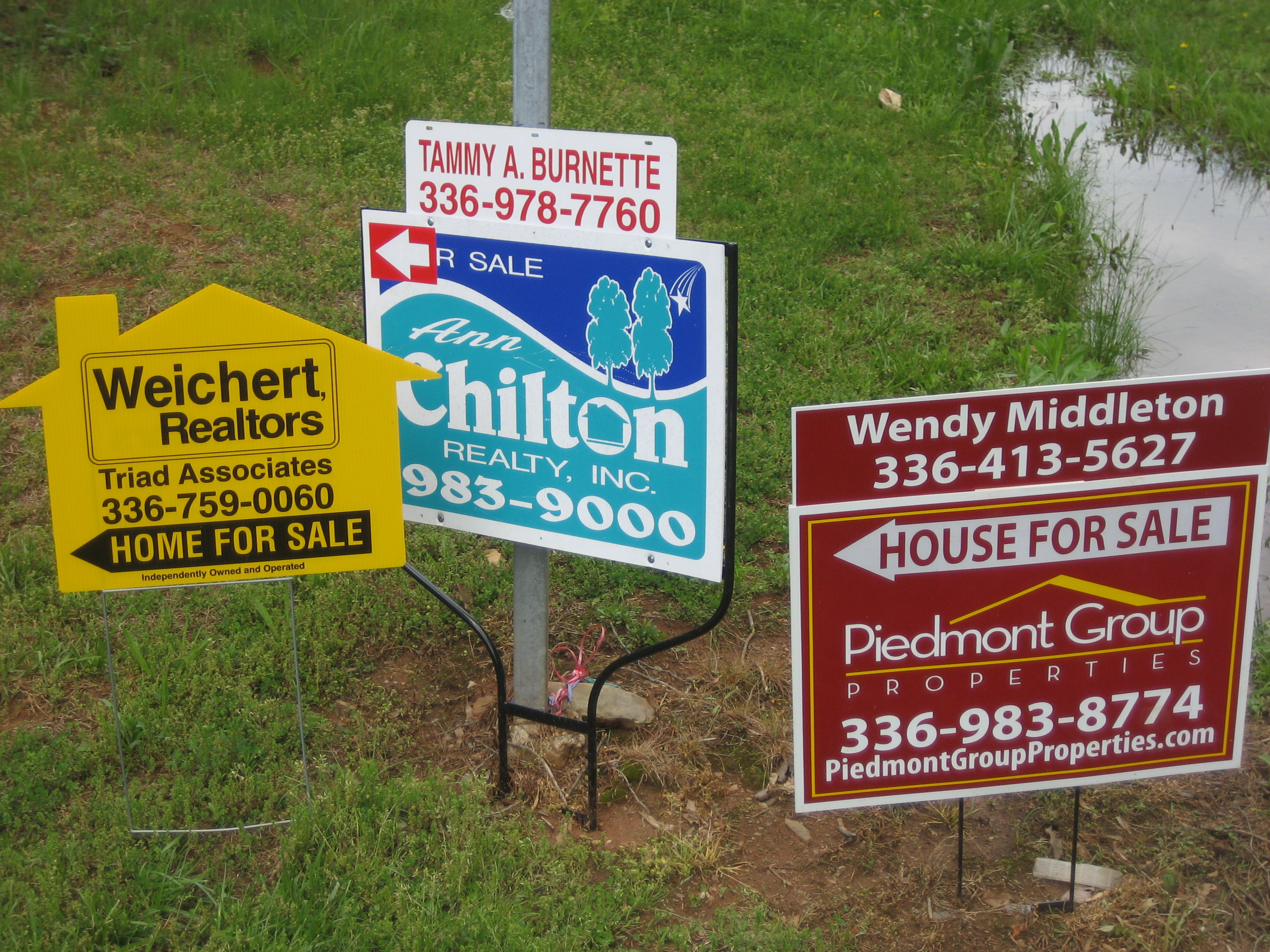
Lawn signs used by Realtors to advertise homes for sale

=== National Association of Realtors ===
In the United States, most homes are bought and sold using real estate agents affiliated with the National Association of Realtors (NAR), an industry lobbying group with over 1.5 million individual members. NAR permits only its members to call themselves Realtors.

=== Commission rates ===
Fees paid to Realtors during home sales in the United States average around 6% of the sale price, a percentage considered exceptionally high compared to rates in other developed countries such as Australia, Canada, and the United Kingdom. Industry research shows that Americans pay $100 billion in commissions to real estate agents each year.

=== Cooperative compensation rule ===
Realtors list homes for sale on a multiple listing service (MLS), a database of properties in a specific geographic region. The National Association of Realtors maintains rules that each MLS owned by a local association of Realtors is required to follow.

In 1996, as part of its rules governing multiple listing services, NAR adopted a rule requiring Realtors to make "blanket unilateral offers of compensation" when listing homes for sale on an MLS. These offers of compensation were required to be "a percentage of the gross selling price or as a definite dollar amount" and were to be paid by the seller's agent to the buyer's agent.

=== Steering ===
When a buyer's agent is able to view offers of compensation in advance, it is possible to discourage buyers from pursuing homes that would result in lower pay for the buyer's agent. This practice of encouraging guiding buyers toward homes with higher commission rates is known in real estate as steering. Published research has provided evidence that steering based on commissions does occur.

== Complaint ==
The original complaint was filed on April 29, 2019, in the United States District Court for the Western District of Missouri.

=== Allegations ===
The plaintiffs alleged that the defendants violated the Sherman Antitrust Act, the Missouri Merchandising Practices Act, and the Missouri Antitrust Law by engaging in a price fixing conspiracy that caused home sellers to pay inflated amounts.

== Trial ==
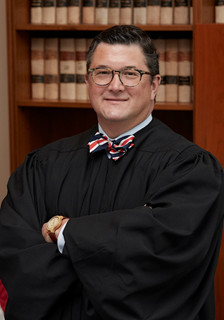
Judge Stephen R. Bough presided over the trial

Judge Stephen R. Bough presided over the trial, which was held at the Charles Evans Whittaker Courthouse in Kansas City, Missouri, between October 16, 2023, and October 31, 2023.

=== Testimony ===
==== Craig Schulman ====
Craig Schulman, an economics professor at Texas A&M University, testified for the plaintiffs as an expert witness. Schulman stated that NAR's cooperative compensation rule was "one of the clearest cases of price-fixing and collusion" he'd ever seen. Analysis by Schulman showed that the average buyer commission rate was 3% in 95% of the Missouri home sales that were studied.

==== Hollee Ellis ====
One plaintiff, Hollee Ellis, testified that she paid a total commission rate of 6% when she sold her home, and that she was never informed that the commission was negotiable. She netted $18,295 from the sale of her home, but 40% of that went to commissions paid to the listing agent from Coldwell Banker (a subsidiary of Anywhere Real Estate) and to the buyer's agent from Keller Williams Realty.

==== Rhonda Burnett ====
Rhonda Burnett, the lead plaintiff, testified about her experience with a real estate agent from HomeServices of America subsidiary ReeceNichols. According to Burnett, the agent gave her a contract to sign with a commission rate of 6% already filled in, and she was told that the rate was non-negotiable.

==== Jeremy Keel ====
Jeremy Keel, another plaintiff, testified that he paid a 6% commission, with 3% going to the Keller Williams agent he hired and 3% going to the buyer's agent from ReeceNichols. He said that the commission rates were already filled in on the contracts he signed, and that he didn't know that commissions could be negotiated.

==== Jerod Breit ====
Jerod Breit, the fourth plaintiff to testify, told the court that his real estate agent from RE/MAX promised him a 5.5% commission, but actually charged him the full 6%.

==== Gary Keller ====
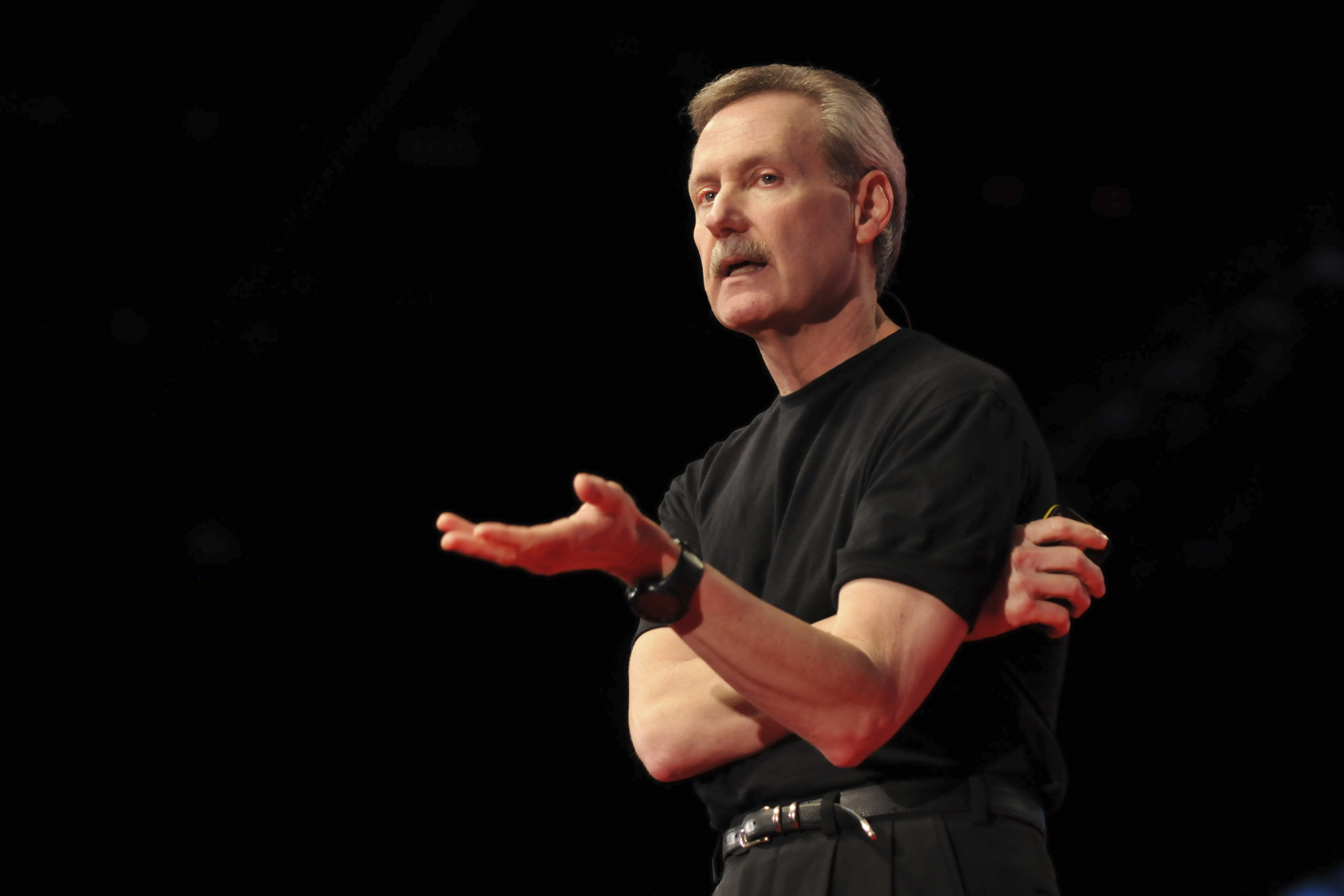
Keller Williams founder Gary Keller testified during the trial

Gary Keller, the founder of real estate brokerage Keller Williams, was called to the witness stand by the defense. Keller testified that there is no standard commission rate and that commissions are set by market conditions.

=== Verdict ===
The eight-person jury deliberated for 2 hours and 28 minutes before returning a unanimous verdict against the defendants on October 31, 2023. The organizations and corporations found liable were:

1. National Association of Realtors
2. HomeServices of America, Inc.
3. BHH Affiliates, LLC
4. HSF Affiliates, LLC
5. Keller Williams Realty, Inc.
6. Anywhere Real Estate, Inc.
7. RE/MAX, LLC

Jurors found that all the defendants in the case "knowingly and voluntarily" engaged in a conspiracy with the goal of "raising, inflating, or stabilizing broker commission rates paid by home sellers" by following and enforcing NAR's cooperative compensation rule. The jury awarded $1.8 billion in damages, which was eligible to be trebled to $5.4 billion.

== Settlement ==
On March 15, 2024, the National Association of Realtors announced that it would settle the lawsuit rather than appeal. The group agreed to change how commissions are paid and to pay back $418 million over four years. The judge presiding over the case granted preliminary approval to the settlement on April 23, 2024. A deadline of July 2024 was set for practice changes, which was later moved to August 17, 2024.

=== Practice changes ===
The cooperative compensation rule has been eliminated as a result of the settlement. Seller's agents are no longer required to offer compensation to buyer's agents when listing a home for sale on a Realtor-owned multiple listing service. In addition, Realtors acting as buyer's agents must enter into contracts with buyers before touring any homes, allowing buyers to negotiate how much they will pay their buyer's agent.

== See also ==
- List of class-action lawsuits
