= Courts of Missouri =

Courts of Missouri include:

State courts of Missouri

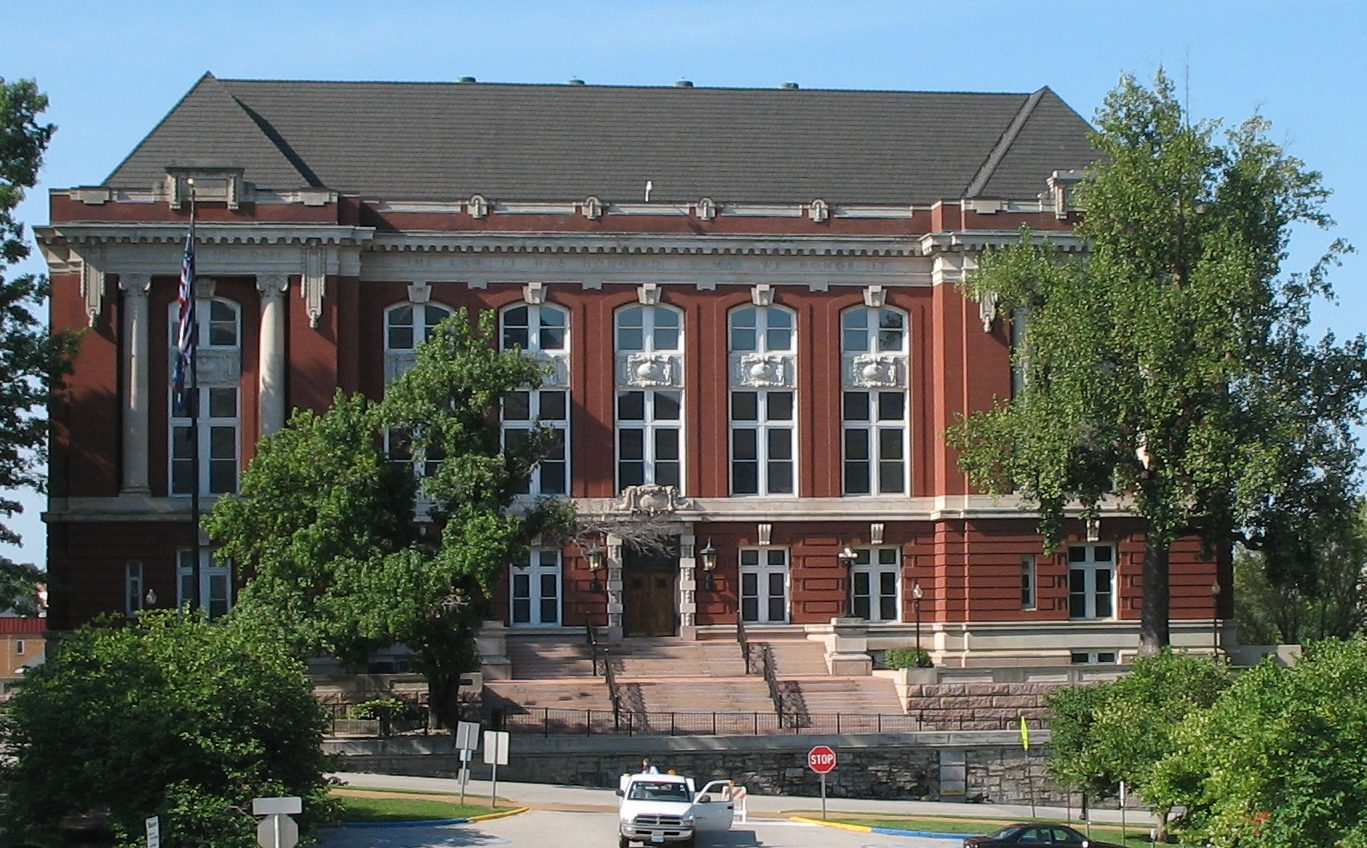
Missouri State Supreme Court building across from state capitol in Jefferson City.

- Supreme Court of Missouri
  - Missouri Court of Appeals (3 districts)
    - Missouri Circuit Courts (46 circuits)

Federal courts located in Missouri

- United States Court of Appeals for the Eighth Circuit (headquartered in St. Louis, having jurisdiction over the United States District Courts of Arkansas, Iowa, Minnesota, Missouri, Nebraska, North Dakota, South Dakota)
- United States District Court for the Eastern District of Missouri
- United States District Court for the Western District of Missouri

Former federal courts of Missouri

- United States District Court for the District of Missouri (extinct, subdivided)
