= David Gregory Kays =

American judge (born 1962)

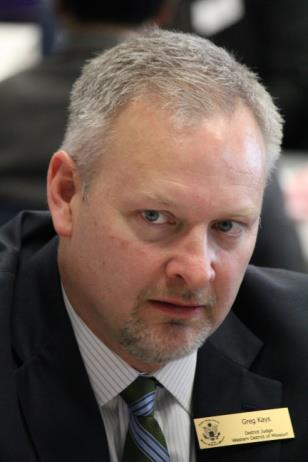
- Kays in 2012

Chief Judge of the United States District Court for the Western District of Missouri
- In office January 3, 2014 – January 2, 2019
- Preceded by: Fernando J. Gaitan Jr.
- Succeeded by: Beth Phillips

Judge of the United States District Court for the Western District of Missouri
- Incumbent
- Assumed office June 19, 2008
- Appointed by: George W. Bush
- Preceded by: Dean Whipple

Personal details
- Born: David Gregory Kays; 1962 (age 63–64) Kansas City, Missouri, U.S.
- Education: Missouri State University (BS); University of Arkansas School of Law (JD)

David Gregory Kays (born 1962) is a United States district judge of the United States District Court for the Western District of Missouri.

== Education and career ==
Born in Kansas City, Missouri, Kays received a Bachelor of Science degree from Southwest Missouri State University (now Missouri State University) in 1985 and a Juris Doctor from the University of Arkansas School of Law in 1987. He was in private practice in Missouri from 1988 to 1989. He was an assistant public defender in the Office of the Special Public Defender for Springfield, Missouri, in 1989. He worked in the Prosecuting Attorney's Office for Laclede County from 1988 to 1995, first as an assistant prosecuting attorney from 1988 to 1989, then as a chief assistant prosecuting attorney from 1989 to 1991, and finally as a prosecuting attorney from 1991 to 1995. He was an adjunct faculty member at Drury University from 1991 to 2004. He was Associate Circuit Judge for Laclede County from 1995 to 2004, and was Presiding Judge for the Twenty-sixth Judicial Circuit of the State of Missouri from 2005 to 2008.

== Federal judicial service ==
On November 15, 2007, Kays was nominated by President George W. Bush to a seat on the United States District Court for the Western District of Missouri vacated by Dean Whipple. Kays was confirmed by the United States Senate on June 10, 2008, and received his commission on June 19, 2008. He served as Chief Judge from January 3, 2014 to January 2, 2019.

On May 21, 2026, Kays announced that he would be taking Senior Status.

== Sources ==
Legal offices
| Preceded by Dean Whipple | Judge of the United States District Court for the Western District of Missouri; 2008–present | Incumbent |
| Preceded by Fernando J. Gaitan Jr. | Chief Judge of the United States District Court for the Western District of Missouri; 2014–2019 | Succeeded by Mary Elizabeth Phillips |
