= William Robert Collinson =

American judge

Senior Judge of the United States District Court for the Eastern District of Missouri Senior Judge of the United States District Court for the Western District of Missouri
- In office August 19, 1980 – June 1, 1995

Judge of the United States District Court for the Eastern District of Missouri Judge of the United States District Court for the Western District of Missouri
- In office August 11, 1965 – August 19, 1980
- Appointed by: Lyndon B. Johnson
- Preceded by: Richard M. Duncan
- Succeeded by: Joseph Edward Stevens Jr.

Personal details
- Born: August 26, 1912 Chariton, Iowa, U.S.
- Died: June 1, 1995 (aged 82) Springfield, Missouri, U.S.
- Education: Drury College (A.B.); University of Missouri School of Law (J.D.)

William Robert Collinson (August 26, 1912 – June 1, 1995) was a United States district judge of the United States District Court for the Eastern District of Missouri and the United States District Court for the Western District of Missouri.

== Education and career ==
Born in Chariton, Iowa, Collinson received an Artium Baccalaureus degree from Drury College in 1933 and a Juris Doctor from the University of Missouri School of Law in 1935. He was in private practice in Kansas City, Missouri from 1935 to 1936, and then in Springfield, Missouri until 1941. He was a prosecuting attorney for Springfield from 1941 to 1944. He was in the United States Navy towards the end of World War II, from 1944 to 1946 and became a lieutenant. He returned to private practice in Springfield from 1946 to 1949. He was a Judge of the Circuit Court of Missouri from 1949 to 1965.

== Federal judicial service ==
On July 14, 1965, Collinson was nominated by President Lyndon B. Johnson to a joint seat on the United States District Court for the Eastern District of Missouri and the United States District Court for the Western District of Missouri vacated by Judge Richard M. Duncan. Collison was confirmed by the United States Senate on August 11, 1965, and received his commission the same day. He assumed senior status on August 19, 1980, serving in that capacity until his death on June 1, 1995, in Springfield.

== Sources ==
Legal offices
Preceded by Richard M. Duncan	Judge of the United States District Court for the Eastern District of Missouri; Judge of the United States District Court for the Western District of Missouri; 1965–1980	Succeeded by Joseph Edward Stevens Jr.
