= Megan Benton =

American judge (born 1985)

Megan Blair Benton
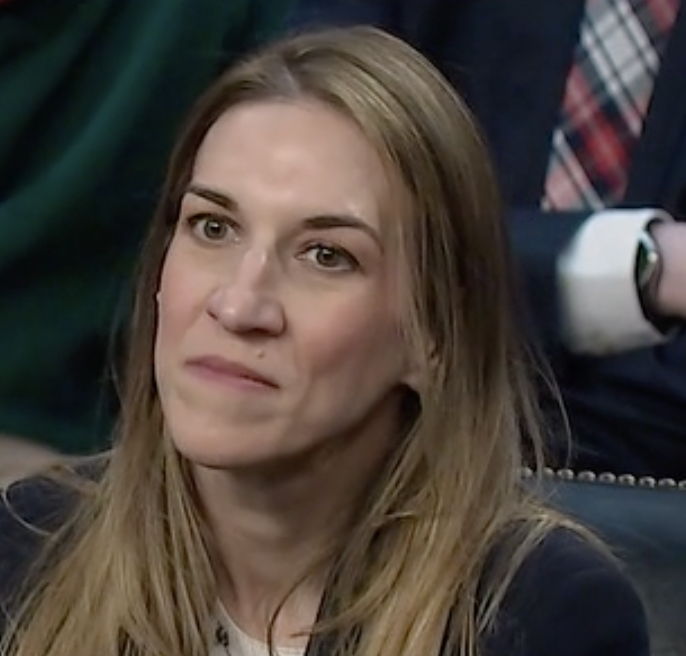

Judge of the United States District Court for the Western District of Missouri
- Incumbent
- Assumed office February 10, 2026
- Appointed by: Donald Trump
- Preceded by: M. Douglas Harpool

Personal details
- Born: 1985 (age 40–41) Columbia, Missouri, U.S.
- Relations: Duane Benton (father)
- Education: Emory University (BA, MA); Vanderbilt University (JD)

Megan Blair Benton (born 1985) is an American lawyer who has served as a United States district judge of the United States District Court for the Western District of Missouri since 2026. She was previously a judge of Missouri's 6th Judicial Circuit from 2021 to 2026.

== Early life and education ==
Benton is the daughter of Duane Benton, a judge on the United States Court of Appeals for the Eighth Circuit. She received Bachelor of Arts and Master of Arts degrees from Emory University. She received a Juris Doctor from the Vanderbilt University Law School.

== Career ==
Benton served as a prosecuting attorney in the Platte County prosecutor's office. From 2021 to 2026, she was a judge of Missouri's 6th Judicial Circuit, which covers the same county. She was appointed by Missouri Governor Mike Parson.

=== Federal judicial service ===
On November 14, 2025, President Donald Trump announced his intention to nominate Benton to a seat on the United States District Court for the Western District of Missouri to be vacated by Judge M. Douglas Harpool. On December 17, 2025, the U.S. Senate Judiciary Committee held a hearing on her nomination. On January 15, 2026 the committee advanced her nomination by a 12–10 vote. On February 4, the Senate invoked cloture on her nomination by a 51–47 vote. Later that day, her nomination was confirmed by a 51–46 vote. She received her judicial commission on February 10, 2026.

Legal offices
Preceded by M. Douglas Harpool	Judge of the United States District Court for the Western District of Missouri; 2026–present	Incumbent
