= Albert Reeves =

Albert Reeves may refer to:

- Albert L. Reeves Jr. (1906–1987), U.S. Representative from Missouri
- Albert L. Reeves (1873–1971), US federal judge
