= Elmo Bolton Hunter =

American judge

Senior Judge of the United States District Court for the Western District of Missouri
- In office December 31, 1980 – December 27, 2003

Chief Judge of the United States District Court for the Western District of Missouri
- In office 1980–1980
- Preceded by: John Watkins Oliver
- Succeeded by: Russell Gentry Clark

Judge of the United States District Court for the Western District of Missouri
- In office August 11, 1965 – December 31, 1980
- Appointed by: Lyndon B. Johnson
- Preceded by: Floyd Robert Gibson
- Succeeded by: John R. Gibson

Personal details
- Born: Elmo Bolton Hunter; October 23, 1915 St. Louis, Missouri, U.S.
- Died: December 27, 2003 (aged 88) Lee's Summit, Missouri, U.S.
- Education: University of Missouri (A.B.); University of Missouri School of Law (LL.B.)

Elmo Bolton Hunter (October 23, 1915 – December 27, 2003) was a United States district judge of the United States District Court for the Western District of Missouri.

== Education and career ==
Born in St. Louis, Missouri, Hunter received an Artium Baccalaureus degree from the University of Missouri in 1936 and a Bachelor of Laws from the University of Missouri School of Law in 1938. He was a law clerk to Judge Kimbrough Stone of the United States Court of Appeals for the Eighth Circuit from 1938 to 1939. He was senior assistant city counselor for Kansas City, Missouri from 1939 to 1941, and was a Fellow with the Cook Fellowship at the University of Michigan Law School in 1941. He was a Special Assistant United States Attorney for the Western District of Missouri and District of Kansas for prosecution of war fraud cases from 1941 to 1942. He served in the United States Army as a Lieutenant during World War II, from 1942 to 1945. He then went into private practice in Kansas City, Missouri from 1945 to 1951. Hunter was a Judge of the Circuit Court of Missouri from 1951 to 1957, and then on the Kansas City District of the Missouri Court of Appeals from 1957 to 1965. During this time, he was an Instructor of law at the University of Missouri from 1952 to 1962.

== Federal judicial service ==
On July 14, 1965, Hunter was nominated by President Lyndon B. Johnson to a seat on the United States District Court for the Western District of Missouri vacated by Judge Floyd Robert Gibson. Hunter was confirmed by the United States Senate on August 11, 1965, and received his commission the same day. He served as Chief Judge in 1980. He assumed senior status on December 31, 1980, and served in that capacity until his death on December 27, 2003, in Lee's Summit, Missouri.

== Sources ==
Legal offices
Preceded by Floyd Robert Gibson	Judge of the United States District Court for the Western District of Missouri; 1965–1980	Succeeded by John R. Gibson
Preceded by John Watkins Oliver	Chief Judge of the United States District Court for the Western District of Missouri; 1980	Succeeded by Russell Gentry Clark
