= Brian C. Wimes =

American judge (born 1966)

Brian Wimes
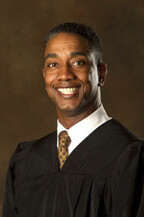

Chief Judge of the United States District Court for the Western District of Missouri
- Incumbent
- Assumed office January 1, 2026
- Preceded by: Beth Phillips

Judge of the United States District Court for the Eastern District of Missouri Judge of the United States District Court for the Western District of Missouri
- Incumbent
- Assumed office April 30, 2012
- Appointed by: Barack Obama
- Preceded by: Nanette Kay Laughrey

Personal details
- Born: Brian Curtis Wimes; January 18, 1966 (age 60) Kansas City, Missouri, U.S.
- Education: University of Kansas (BA); Texas Southern University (JD)

Brian Curtis Wimes (born January 18, 1966) is a United States district judge of the United States District Court for the Eastern District of Missouri and United States District Court for the Western District of Missouri, serving since 2026 as the chief judge of the latter. Despite his dual appointment, Wimes maintains chambers only in the Western District of Missouri.

== Biography ==
Wimes graduated from the University of Kansas, in 1990, with a Bachelor of General Studies in political science. He briefly worked for the Kansas City school district prior to entering law school. He graduated from the Thurgood Marshall School of Law with a Juris Doctor in 1994. From 1994 to 1995, he worked as an Attorney Advisor for the U.S. Department of Justice, Bureau of Prisons Litigation Branch, in Washington, D.C. From 1995 to 2001, he worked as an assistant prosecuting attorney in the Jackson County Prosecutors Office. From 2001 to 2007, he served as Drug Court Commissioner in Jackson County. In 2007 he was appointed judge on the Jackson County Circuit Court by Missouri Governor Matt Blunt, a position he held until his confirmation as a U.S. district judge.

=== Federal judicial service ===
On September 22, 2011, President Barack Obama nominated Wimes for district judge of the United States District Court for the Eastern and Western District of Missouri to the seat vacated by Judge Nanette Kay Laughrey, who assumed senior status on August 27, 2011. He received a hearing before the Senate Judiciary Committee on November 14, 2011 and his nomination was reported out of committee by a voice vote on December 15, 2011. On April 23, 2012, the Senate confirmed his nomination by a 92–1 vote, with Utah Senator Mike Lee casting the lone nay vote. He received his commission on April 30, 2012, and was sworn in the same day. He became the chief judge of the Western District in 2026.

=== Notable cases ===
Wimes denied a request for a 19-year-old woman to be present for her father's execution for the death of Officer William McEntee. Kevin Johnson Jr. was executed on November 30. Missouri law prohibits anyone under 21 from witnessing an execution.

On March 7, 2023, Wimes found a state law, signed by Governor Mike Parson, regulating cooperation with federal authorities on firearms issues, to be unconstitutional as a violation of the Supremacy Clause. Missouri Attorney General Andrew Bailey said he would challenge the decision and Republican congressman Eric Burlison denigrated the decision as being understandable supposedly because Wimes was an appointee of President Barack Obama.

== See also ==
- List of African-American federal judges
- List of African-American jurists

Legal offices
Preceded by Nanette Kay Laughrey	Judge of the United States District Court for the Eastern District of Missouri; Judge of the United States District Court for the Western District of Missouri; 2012–present	Incumbent
Preceded by Beth Phillips	Chief Judge of the United States District Court for the Western District of Missouri; 2026–present	Incumbent
