= Fernando J. Gaitan Jr. =

American judge (born 1948)

Fernando Joe Gaitan Jr.
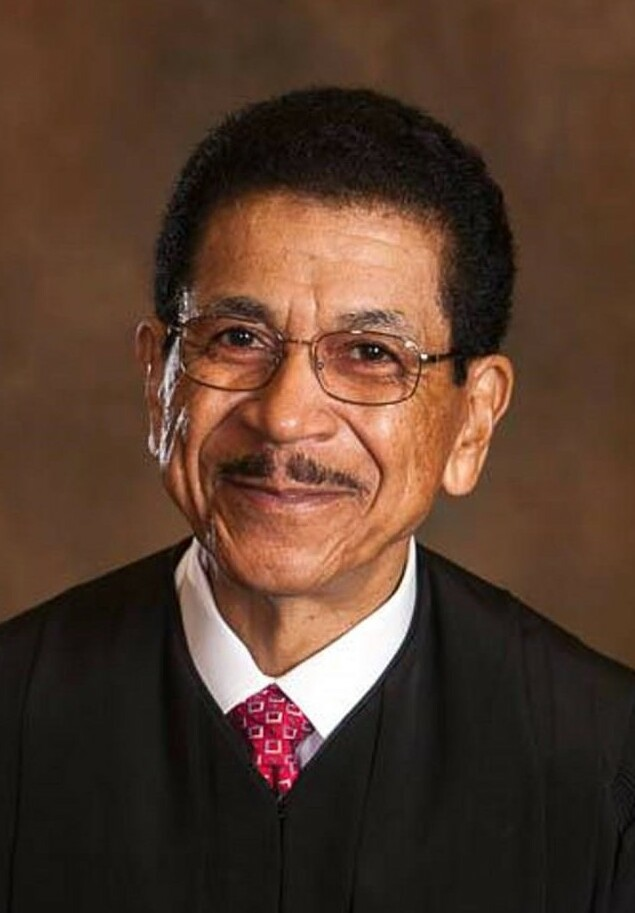

Senior Judge of the United States District Court for the Western District of Missouri
- Incumbent
- Assumed office January 3, 2014

Chief Judge of the United States District Court for the Western District of Missouri
- In office 2007–2014
- Preceded by: Dean Whipple
- Succeeded by: David Gregory Kays

Judge of the United States District Court for the Western District of Missouri
- In office August 2, 1991 – January 3, 2014
- Appointed by: George H. W. Bush
- Preceded by: Russell Gentry Clark
- Succeeded by: Stephen R. Bough

Personal details
- Born: Fernando Joe Gaitan Jr. August 22, 1948 (age 77) Kansas City, Kansas, U.S.
- Education: Pittsburg State University (BS); University of Missouri-Kansas City (JD)

Fernando Joe Gaitan Jr. (born August 22, 1948) is a senior United States district judge of the United States District Court for the Western District of Missouri.

== Early life and education ==
Born in Kansas City, Kansas, Gaitan graduated from Sumner High School in Kansas City, Kansas in 1966. Gaitan attended Donnelly College in Kansas City, Kansas from 1967 to 1968 and received a Bachelor of Science from Pittsburg State University in Pittsburg, Kansas in 1970 and a Juris Doctor from the University of Missouri-Kansas City School of Law in 1974.

== Career ==
Gaitan was an attorney for Southwestern Bell Telephone Company from 1974 to 1980. He was a judge on the Jackson County Circuit Court from 1980 to 1986, and then on the Missouri Court of Appeals, Western District, until 1991.

=== Federal judicial service ===
On May 16, 1991, Gaitan was nominated by President George H. W. Bush to a seat on the United States District Court for the Western District of Missouri vacated by Russell Gentry Clark. Gaitan was confirmed by the United States Senate on July 18, 1991, and received his commission on August 2, 1991. He served as Chief Judge from 2007 to 2014. He took senior status on January 3, 2014.

== See also ==
- List of African-American federal judges
- List of African-American jurists

== Sources ==
Legal offices
Preceded by Russell Gentry Clark	Judge of the United States District Court for the Western District of Missouri; 1991–2014	Succeeded by Stephen R. Bough
Preceded by Dean Whipple	Chief Judge of the United States District Court for the Western District of Missouri; 2007–2014	Succeeded by David Gregory Kays
