= Stephen R. Bough =

American judge (born 1970)

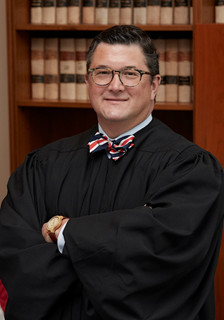

Judge of the United States District Court for the Western District of Missouri
- Incumbent
- Assumed office December 19, 2014
- Appointed by: Barack Obama
- Preceded by: Fernando J. Gaitan Jr.

Personal details
- Born: Stephen Rogers Bough; December 1970 (age 55) Gainesville, Florida, U.S.
- Education: Missouri State University (BS); University of Missouri–Kansas City (JD)

Military service
- Allegiance: United States
- Branch/service: United States Army
- Years of service: 1989–1995
- Rank: Sergeant
- Unit: Missouri National Guard

Stephen Rogers Bough (born December 1970) is a United States district judge of the United States District Court for the Western District of Missouri.

== Biography ==
Bough was raised in Republic, Missouri and graduated with a Bachelor of Science degree from Southwest Missouri State University (now Missouri State University) in 1993. He served in the Missouri National Guard from 1989 to 1995, attaining the rank of sergeant. He received a Juris Doctor from the University of Missouri–Kansas City School of Law in 1997. Bough served as a law clerk to Judge Scott Olin Wright of the United States District Court for the Western District of Missouri. From 1999 to 2002, he practiced law at Shamberg, Johnson & Bergman and from 2002 to 2006, he practiced at Henning & Bough. From 2006 to 2014, he owned a private law practice. From 2011 to 2014, Bough served on the Board of Governors of Missouri State University. Bough served three years on the board of governors of The Missouri Bar and received the Lon O. Hocker award in 2005.

=== Federal judicial service ===
On January 16, 2014, President Barack Obama nominated Bough to serve as a United States district judge of the United States District Court for the Western District of Missouri, to the seat vacated by Fernando J. Gaitan Jr., who assumed senior status on January 3, 2014. On July 24, 2014, a hearing before the United States Senate Committee on the Judiciary was held on his nomination. On September 18, 2014, his nomination was reported out of committee by a 10–8 vote. On December 13, 2014 Senate Majority Leader Harry Reid filed a motion to invoke cloture on the nomination. On December 16, 2014, the U.S. Senate invoked cloture on his nomination by a 51–38 vote. He was confirmed later that day by a 51–38 vote. He received his federal judicial commission on December 19, 2014. He was sworn in on December 29, 2014.

Legal offices
Preceded by Fernando J. Gaitan Jr.	Judge of the United States District Court for the Western District of Missouri; 2014–present	Incumbent
