= William H. Becker =

American judge in Missouri (1909–1992)

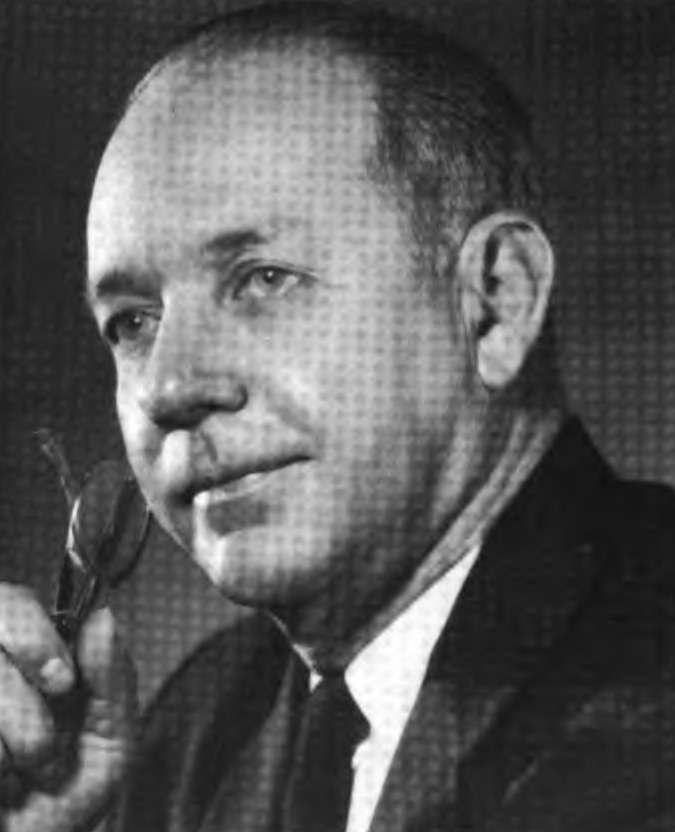

Senior Judge of the United States District Court for the Western District of Missouri
- In office February 8, 1977 – February 2, 1992

Chief Judge of the United States District Court for the Western District of Missouri
- In office 1965–1977
- Preceded by: Floyd Robert Gibson
- Succeeded by: John Watkins Oliver

Judge of the United States District Court for the Western District of Missouri
- In office September 18, 1961 – February 8, 1977
- Appointed by: John F. Kennedy
- Preceded by: Albert Alphonso Ridge
- Succeeded by: Russell Gentry Clark

Personal details
- Born: William Henry Becker; August 26, 1909 Brookhaven, Mississippi, U.S.
- Died: February 2, 1992 (aged 82) Columbia, Missouri, U.S.
- Education: University of Missouri School of Law (LL.B.)

William Henry Becker (August 26, 1909 – February 2, 1992) was a United States district judge of the United States District Court for the Western District of Missouri.

== Education and career ==
Born in 1909, Becker received a Bachelor of Laws from University of Missouri School of Law in 1932. He was in private practice law in Columbia, Missouri from 1932 to 1961. He was special counsel to the Missouri Insurance Department from 1936 to 1944. He was counsel to Governor Lloyd Stark in the Kansas City criminal investigation from 1938 to 1939. He was a United States Naval Reserve Lieutenant from 1944 to 1947. He was special assistant to the director of Economic Stabilization Commission of the United States from 1945 to 1946. He was special commissioner for the Supreme Court of Missouri from 1954 to 1958.

== Federal judicial service ==
Becker was nominated by President John F. Kennedy on August 21, 1961, to a seat on the United States District Court for the Western District of Missouri vacated by Judge Albert Alphonso Ridge. He was confirmed by the United States Senate on September 8, 1961, and received his commission on September 18, 1961. He served as Chief Judge from 1965 to 1977. He was a member of the Judicial Panel on Multidistrict Litigation from 1968 to 1977. He was a Judge of the Temporary Emergency Court of Appeals from 1977 to 1992. He assumed senior status on February 8, 1977. His service was terminated on February 2, 1992, due to his death in Columbia.

== Sources ==
Legal offices
Preceded by Albert Alphonso Ridge	Judge of the United States District Court for the Western District of Missouri; 1961–1977	Succeeded by Russell Gentry Clark
Preceded by Floyd Robert Gibson	Chief Judge of the United States District Court for the Western District of Missouri; 1965–1977	Succeeded by John Watkins Oliver
