= Joseph Edward Stevens Jr. =

American judge

Senior Judge of the United States District Court for the Eastern District of Missouri Senior Judge of the United States District Court for the Western District of Missouri
- In office July 1, 1995 – December 18, 1998

Chief Judge of the United States District Court for the Western District of Missouri
- In office 1992–1995
- Preceded by: Howard F. Sachs
- Succeeded by: D. Brook Bartlett

Judge of the United States District Court for the Eastern District of Missouri Judge of the United States District Court for the Western District of Missouri
- In office September 18, 1981 – July 1, 1995
- Appointed by: Ronald Reagan
- Preceded by: William Robert Collinson
- Succeeded by: Nanette Kay Laughrey

Personal details
- Born: June 23, 1928 Kansas City, Missouri, U.S.
- Died: December 18, 1998 (aged 70) Kansas City, Missouri, U.S.
- Education: Yale University (B.A.); University of Michigan Law School (J.D.)

Joseph Edward Stevens Jr. (June 23, 1928 – December 18, 1998) was a United States district judge of the United States District Court for the Eastern District of Missouri and the United States District Court for the Western District of Missouri.

== Education and career ==
Born in Kansas City, Missouri, Stevens received a Bachelor of Arts degree from Yale University in 1949 and a Juris Doctor from the University of Michigan Law School in 1952. He was a lieutenant in the United States Naval Reserve from 1952 to 1960. He was on active duty from 1952 to 1955. He was in private practice in Kansas City, Missouri from 1955 to 1980.

== Federal judicial service ==
Stevens was nominated by President Ronald Reagan on July 9, 1981, to a joint seat on the United States District Court for the Eastern District of Missouri and United States District Court for the Western District of Missouri vacated by Judge William Robert Collinson. He was confirmed by the United States Senate on September 16, 1981, and received his commission on September 18, 1981. He served as Chief Judge of the Western District only from 1992 to 1995. He assumed senior status on July 1, 1995. Stevens served in that capacity until his death in Kansas City, Missouri, on December 18, 1998.

== Sources ==
Legal offices
Preceded by William Robert Collinson	Judge of the United States District Court for the Eastern District of Missouri; Judge of the United States District Court for the Western District of Missouri; 1981–1995	Succeeded by Nanette Kay Laughrey
Preceded by Howard F. Sachs	Chief Judge of the United States District Court for the Western District of Missouri; 1992–1995	Succeeded by D. Brook Bartlett
