= Beth Phillips =

American judge (born 1969)

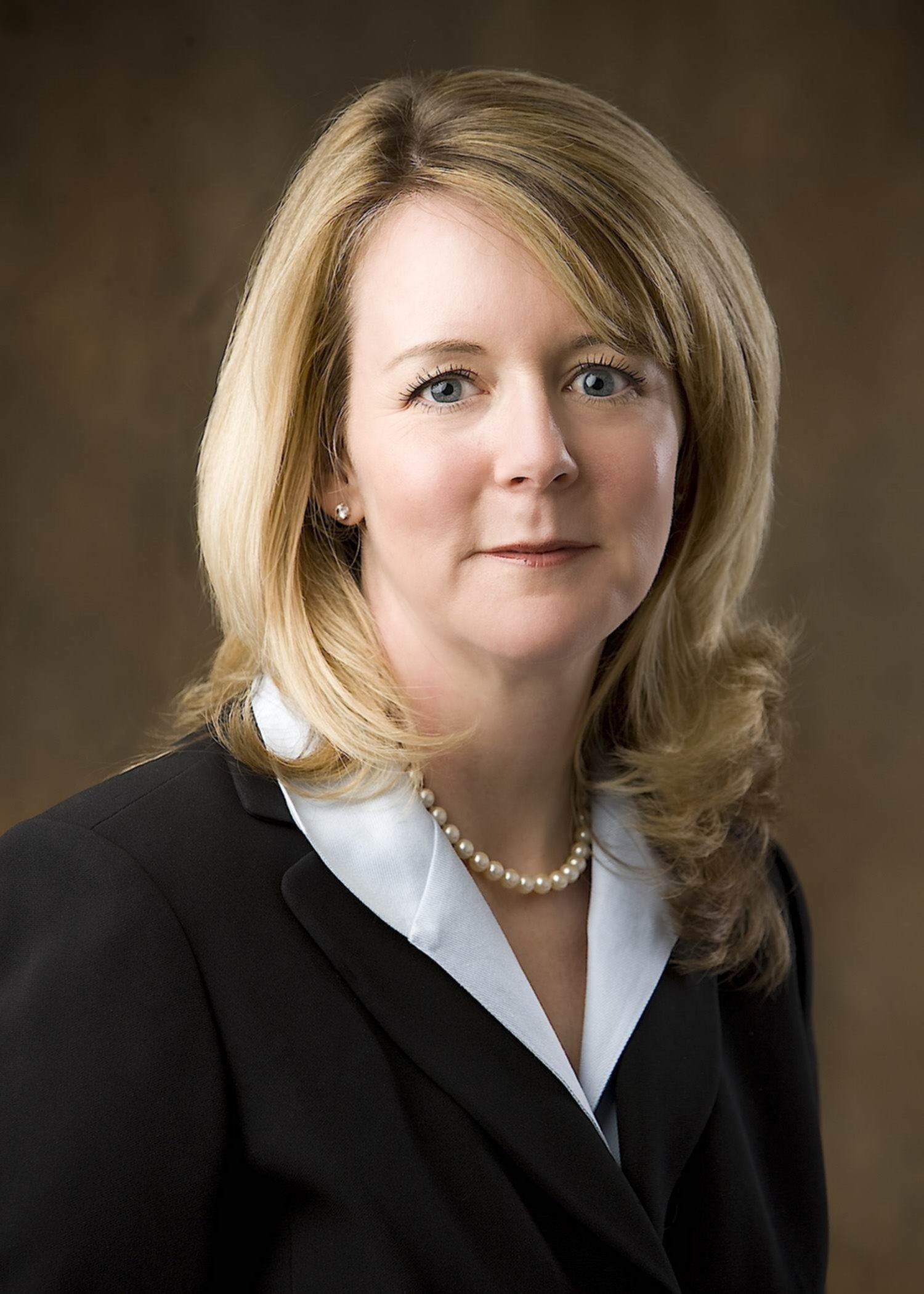

Chief Judge of the United States District Court for the Western District of Missouri
- In office January 3, 2019 – December 31, 2025
- Preceded by: David Gregory Kays
- Succeeded by: Brian C. Wimes

Judge of the United States District Court for the Western District of Missouri
- Incumbent
- Assumed office March 22, 2012
- Appointed by: Barack Obama
- Preceded by: Ortrie D. Smith

United States Attorney for the Western District of Missouri
- In office December 24, 2009 – March 22, 2012
- Appointed by: Barack Obama
- Preceded by: John Wood
- Succeeded by: David Ketchmark (acting)

Personal details
- Born: 1969 (age 56–57) Kirksville, Missouri, U.S.
- Spouse: W. Brent Powell
- Education: University of Chicago (BA, MA); University of Missouri (JD)

Mary Elizabeth "Beth" Phillips (born 1969) is a United States district judge of the United States District Court for the Western District of Missouri.

== Early life and education ==
Phillips was born in Kirksville, Missouri, in 1969. She received two degrees from the University of Chicago, a Bachelor of Arts in 1991 and a Master of Arts in 1992. Phillips then earned her Juris Doctor from the University of Missouri School of Law in 1996.

== Career ==
=== U.S. attorney ===
On September 30, 2009, President Barack Obama nominated Phillips to serve as the United States Attorney for the Western District of Missouri. She was confirmed by the United States Senate on December 24, 2009.

=== Federal judicial service ===
On June 7, 2011, President Barack Obama nominated Phillips to a seat on United States District Court for the Western District of Missouri. She would replace Judge Ortrie D. Smith, who assumed senior status in 2011. She received a hearing before the Senate Judiciary Committee on September 20, 2011, and her nomination was reported to the floor of the Senate by a voice vote on October 13, 2011. On March 6, 2012, the United States Senate confirmed Phillips' nomination by a 95–2 vote. She received her commission on March 22, 2012. She was sworn in on March 23, 2012. She became chief judge on January 3, 2019.

Legal offices
Preceded by John Wood	United States Attorney for the Western District of Missouri; 2009–2012	Succeeded by David Ketchmark; Acting
Preceded by Ortrie D. Smith	Judge of the United States District Court for the Western District of Missouri; 2012–present	Incumbent
Preceded by David Gregory Kays	Chief Judge of the United States District Court for the Western District of Missouri; 2019–2025	Succeeded by Brian C. Wimes
