= Russell Gentry Clark =

American judge (1925–2003)

Senior Judge of the United States District Court for the Western District of Missouri
- In office August 1, 1991 – July 31, 2000

Chief Judge of the United States District Court for the Western District of Missouri
- In office 1980–1985
- Preceded by: Elmo Bolton Hunter
- Succeeded by: Scott Olin Wright

Judge of the United States District Court for the Western District of Missouri
- In office July 5, 1977 – August 1, 1991
- Appointed by: Jimmy Carter
- Preceded by: William H. Becker
- Succeeded by: Fernando J. Gaitan Jr.

Personal details
- Born: Russell Gentry Clark; July 27, 1925 Oregon County, Missouri, U.S.
- Died: April 17, 2003 (aged 77) Springfield, Missouri, U.S.
- Education: University of Missouri School of Law (LLB)

Russell Gentry Clark (July 27, 1925 – April 17, 2003) was a United States district judge of the United States District Court for the Western District of Missouri.

== Education and career ==
Born in Oregon County, Missouri, Clark was a lieutenant in the United States Army during World War II, from 1944 to 1946, and later received a Bachelor of Laws from the University of Missouri-Columbia School of Law (now the University of Missouri School of Law) in 1952. He was in private practice in Springfield, Missouri from 1952 to 1977.

== Federal judicial service ==
On June 13, 1977, Clark was nominated by President Jimmy Carter to a seat on the United States District Court for the Western District of Missouri vacated by Judge William H. Becker. Clark was confirmed by the United States Senate on July 1, 1977, and received his commission on July 5, 1977. He served as Chief Judge from 1980 to 1985, and assumed senior status on August 1, 1991. Clark retired completely from the bench on July 31, 2000.

== Notable case ==
Clark ordered tax increases to come up with the massive amounts of money he ordered to be spent by the Kansas City school district in the case of Missouri v. Jenkins. Starting with his order "federal judges ordered more than $2 billion in new spending by the school district to encourage desegregation."

== Death ==
He died on April 17, 2003, in Springfield.

== See also ==
History of Kansas City

== Sources ==
Legal offices
Preceded by William H. Becker	Judge of the United States District Court for the Western District of Missouri; 1977–1991	Succeeded by Fernando J. Gaitan Jr.
Preceded by Elmo Bolton Hunter	Chief Judge of the United States District Court for the Western District of Missouri; 1980–1985	Succeeded by Scott Olin Wright
