= Nanette Kay Laughrey =

American judge (born 1946)

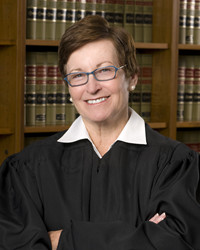

Senior Judge of the United States District Court for the Eastern District of Missouri Senior Judge of the United States District Court for the Western District of Missouri
- Incumbent
- Assumed office August 27, 2011

Judge of the United States District Court for the Eastern District of Missouri Judge of the United States District Court for the Western District of Missouri
- In office August 1, 1996 – August 27, 2011
- Appointed by: Bill Clinton
- Preceded by: Joseph E. Stevens Jr.
- Succeeded by: Brian C. Wimes

Personal details
- Born: February 11, 1946 (age 80) Cheyenne, Wyoming, U.S.
- Education: UCLA (BA); University of Missouri School of Law (JD)

Nanette Kay Laughrey (born February 11, 1946) is a Senior United States district judge of the United States District Court for the Eastern District of Missouri and the United States District Court for the Western District of Missouri.

== Early life and education ==
Laughrey was born in Cheyenne, Wyoming. She received a Bachelor of Arts degree from the University of California, Los Angeles in 1967, and a Juris Doctor from the University of Missouri School of Law in 1975.

== Career ==
Following law school graduation, Laughrey was an assistant state attorney general of Missouri until 1979, when she served as a municipal judge for Columbia, Missouri until 1983. She became an associate professor of University of Missouri (Columbia) Law School in 1983, and was made a full professor there in 1987. At the same time, she was deputy state attorney general of Missouri from 1992 to 1993.

=== Federal judicial service ===
On October 20, 1995, President Bill Clinton nominated Laughrey to serve on the United States District Court for the Eastern District of Missouri and United States District Court for the Western District of Missouri to a seat vacated by Judge Joseph E. Stevens Jr. who assumed senior status on July 1, 1995. She was confirmed by the United States Senate on July 24, 1996, and received her commission on August 1, 1996. She assumed senior status on August 28, 2011. Despite her joint appointment, Laughrey maintains chambers and hears cases only in the Western District, her chambers being located in Jefferson City.

=== Notable cases ===
Laughrey is best known as the presiding judge in the Miracle Cars case. She has a reputation as a stern judge who exercises complete control over her courtroom. In 2017, she ruled against the right of citizens to film public officials and officers in public.

== Sources ==
Legal offices
Preceded by Joseph E. Stevens Jr.	Judge of the United States District Court for the Eastern District of Missouri; Judge of the United States District Court for the Western District of Missouri; 1996–2011	Succeeded by Brian C. Wimes
