= Ross Thompson Roberts =

American judge

Judge of the United States District Court for the Western District of Missouri
- In office August 20, 1982 – April 24, 1987
- Appointed by: Ronald Reagan
- Preceded by: John R. Gibson
- Succeeded by: Dean Whipple

Personal details
- Born: Ross Thompson Roberts; November 28, 1938 Joplin, Missouri, U.S.
- Died: April 24, 1987 (aged 48)
- Education: DePauw University (B.A.); University of Missouri School of Law (J.D.)

Ross Thompson Roberts (November 28, 1938 – April 24, 1987) was a United States district judge of the United States District Court for the Western District of Missouri.

== Education and career ==
Born in Joplin, Missouri, Roberts received a Bachelor of Arts degree from DePauw University in 1960 and a Juris Doctor from the University of Missouri School of Law in 1963. He went into private practice in Joplin in 1963. From 1964 to 1968 he was a United States Marine Corps Captain. He was in private practice in Kansas City, Missouri, from 1968 to 1970, then resumed private practice in Joplin from 1970 to 1982. He was a prosecuting attorney of Jasper County, Missouri, from 1971 to 1977.

== Federal judicial service ==
Roberts was nominated by President Ronald Reagan on August 6, 1982, to a seat on the United States District Court for the Western District of Missouri vacated by Judge John R. Gibson. He was confirmed by the United States Senate on August 20, 1982, and received his commission the same day. He served in that capacity until his death on April 24, 1987.

== Sources ==
Legal offices
Preceded by John R. Gibson	Judge of the United States District Court for the Western District of Missouri; 1982–1987	Succeeded by Dean Whipple
