= Gary A. Fenner =

American judge (born 1947)

Gary August Fenner
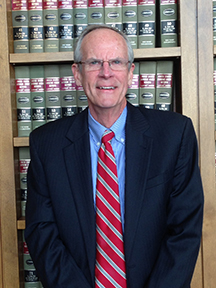

Senior Judge of the United States District Court for the Western District of Missouri
- Incumbent
- Assumed office September 8, 2015

Judge of the United States District Court for the Western District of Missouri
- In office July 25, 1996 – September 8, 2015
- Appointed by: Bill Clinton
- Preceded by: Scott Olin Wright
- Succeeded by: Roseann A. Ketchmark

Personal details
- Born: Gary August Fenner; January 31, 1947 (age 79) St. Joseph, Missouri, U.S.
- Education: University of Kansas (BA); University of Missouri-Kansas City School of Law (JD)

Gary August Fenner (born January 31, 1947) is a senior United States district judge of the United States District Court for the Western District of Missouri.

== Education and career ==
Born in St. Joseph, Missouri, Fenner received a Bachelor of Arts degree from the University of Kansas in Lawrence, Kansas in 1970 and a Juris Doctor from the University of Missouri-Kansas City School of Law in 1973. He was in private practice in Platte City, Missouri in 1973. He was an assistant city attorney of City of St. Joseph from 1973 to 1977. He was a business law instructor, Webster College from 1976 to 1977. He was in private practice in St. Joseph, Missouri from 1977 to 1979. He was a Circuit judge on the Fifth Judicial Circuit Court of Missouri from 1979 to 1987. He was a judge on the Missouri Court of Appeals, Western District from 1988 to 1996, serving as chief judge from 1994 to 1996.

== Federal judicial service ==
Fenner was nominated by President Bill Clinton on December 13, 1995, to be a United States District Judge of the United States District Court for the Western District of Missouri, to a seat vacated by Scott Olin Wright. He was confirmed by the United States Senate on July 10, 1996, and received his commission on July 25, 1996. He assumed senior status on September 8, 2015.

=== Undisclosed luxury travel ===
In May 2024, NPR revealed that Fenner had received free travel in December 2021 to the Breakers Colloquium, a privately funded legal seminar hosted at The Breakers resort in Palm Beach, Florida, but had failed to disclose this on his required annual financial disclosure report for that year, in violation of federal law. In response, Fenner told NPR, "I’m embarrassed about the fact that somehow that was overlooked by me. But I don’t have really an excuse for it, and I’m going to correct it."

Legal offices
Preceded by Scott Olin Wright	Judge of the United States District Court for the Western District of Missouri; 1996–2015	Succeeded by Roseann A. Ketchmark
