= Dean Whipple =

American judge (born 1938)

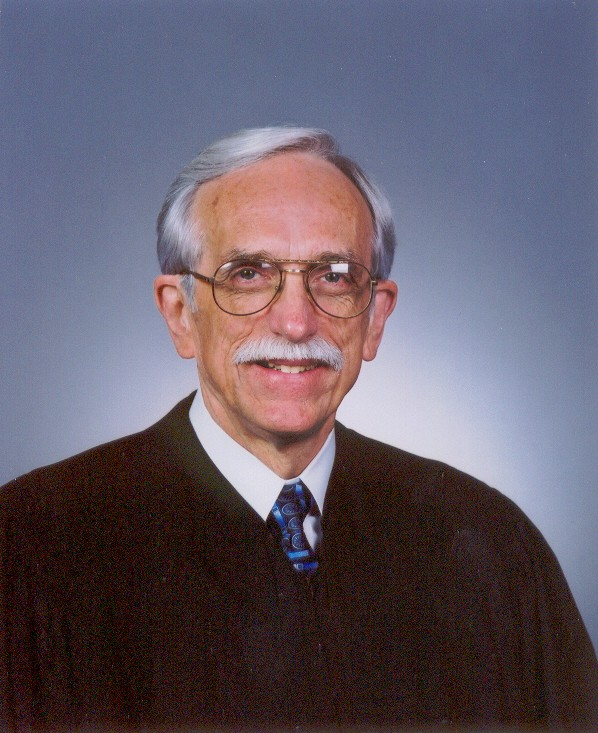

Senior Judge of the United States District Court for the Western District of Missouri
- Incumbent
- Assumed office April 30, 2007

Chief Judge of the United States District Court for the Western District of Missouri
- In office 2000–2007
- Preceded by: D. Brook Bartlett
- Succeeded by: Fernando J. Gaitan Jr.

Judge of the United States District Court for the Western District of Missouri
- In office December 9, 1987 – April 30, 2007
- Appointed by: Ronald Reagan
- Preceded by: Ross Thompson Roberts
- Succeeded by: David Gregory Kays

Personal details
- Born: April 3, 1938 (age 88) Lebanon, Missouri, U.S.
- Education: Drury University (AB); University of Missouri–Kansas City (JD)

Harold Dean Whipple (born April 3, 1938) is a senior United States district judge of the United States District Court for the Western District of Missouri.

== Education and career ==
Born in Lebanon, Missouri on April 3, 1938, Whipple received an Artium Baccalaureus degree from Drury University in 1961 and a Juris Doctor from the University of Missouri–Kansas City School of Law in 1965. He was in private practice in Lebanon from 1967 to 1974. He was a prosecuting attorney of Laclede County, Missouri from 1967 to 1971. He was a judge of the 26th Judicial Circuit Court of the State of Missouri from 1975 to 1987.

== Federal judicial service ==
On September 14, 1987, Whipple was nominated by President Ronald Reagan to a seat on the United States District Court for the Western District of Missouri vacated by Judge Ross Thompson Roberts. Whipple was confirmed by the United States Senate on December 8, 1987, and received his commission the following day. He served as Chief Judge from 2000 to 2007, assuming senior status on April 30, 2007. He was succeeded by Judge David Gregory Kays.

== Sources ==
Legal offices
Preceded by Ross Thompson Roberts	Judge of the United States District Court for the Western District of Missouri; 1987–2007	Succeeded by David Gregory Kays
Preceded by D. Brook Bartlett	Chief Judge of the United States District Court for the Western District of Missouri; 2000–2007	Succeeded by Fernando J. Gaitan Jr.
