= John Watkins Oliver =

American judge

Senior Judge of the United States District Court for the Western District of Missouri
- In office November 3, 1980 – April 25, 1990

Chief Judge of the United States District Court for the Western District of Missouri
- In office 1977–1980
- Preceded by: William H. Becker
- Succeeded by: Elmo Bolton Hunter

Judge of the United States District Court for the Western District of Missouri
- In office April 3, 1962 – November 3, 1980
- Appointed by: John F. Kennedy
- Preceded by: Randle Jasper Smith
- Succeeded by: D. Brook Bartlett

Personal details
- Born: John Watkins Oliver; December 17, 1914 Cape Girardeau, Missouri, U.S.
- Died: April 25, 1990 (aged 75) Kansas City, Missouri, U.S.
- Education: University of Missouri (A.B.); University of Missouri School of Law (LL.B.)

John Watkins Oliver (December 17, 1914 – April 25, 1990) was a United States district judge of the United States District Court for the Western District of Missouri.

== Education and career ==
Born in Cape Girardeau, Missouri, Oliver received an Artium Baccalaureus degree from the University of Missouri in 1933. He received a Bachelor of Laws from University of Missouri School of Law in 1936. He was in private practice of law in Kansas City, Missouri from 1936 to 1962.

== Federal judicial service ==
Oliver was nominated by President John F. Kennedy on March 5, 1962, to a seat on the United States District Court for the Western District of Missouri vacated by Judge Randle Jasper Smith. He was confirmed by the United States Senate on April 2, 1962, and received his commission on April 3, 1962. He served as Chief Judge from 1977 to 1980. He assumed senior status on November 3, 1980. His service was terminated on April 25, 1990, due to his death in Kansas City.

== Sources ==
Legal offices
Preceded by Randle Jasper Smith	Judge of the United States District Court for the Western District of Missouri; 1962–1980	Succeeded by D. Brook Bartlett
Preceded by William H. Becker	Chief Judge of the United States District Court for the Western District of Missouri; 1977–1980	Succeeded by Elmo Bolton Hunter
