= Richard M. Duncan =

American judge (1889–1974)

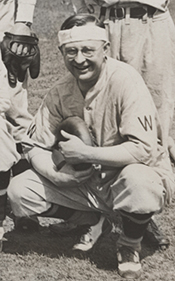

Senior Judge of the United States District Court for the Eastern District of Missouri Senior Judge of the United States District Court for the Western District of Missouri
- In office May 31, 1965 – August 1, 1974

Chief Judge of the United States District Court for the Western District of Missouri
- In office 1954–1959
- Preceded by: Albert L. Reeves
- Succeeded by: Albert Alphonso Ridge

Judge of the United States District Court for the Eastern District of Missouri Judge of the United States District Court for the Western District of Missouri
- In office July 14, 1943 – May 31, 1965
- Appointed by: Franklin D. Roosevelt
- Preceded by: Seat established by 56 Stat. 1083
- Succeeded by: William Robert Collinson

Member of the U.S. House of Representatives from Missouri
- In office March 4, 1933 – January 3, 1943
- Preceded by: Jacob L. Milligan
- Succeeded by: William Clay Cole
- Constituency: at-large (1933–1935); 3rd district (1935–1943)

Personal details
- Born: Richard Meloan Duncan; November 10, 1889 St. Joseph, Missouri, U.S.
- Died: August 11, 1974 (aged 84) Kansas City, Missouri, U.S.
- Resting place: Memorial Park Cemetery; St. Joseph, Missouri
- Party: Democratic
- Education: Christian Brothers College read law

Richard Meloan Duncan (November 10, 1889 – August 1, 1974) was a United States representative from Missouri and a United States district judge of the United States District Court for the Eastern District of Missouri and the United States District Court for the Western District of Missouri.

== Education and career ==
Born in St. Joseph, Missouri, near Edgerton, Missouri, Duncan attended the public schools. He graduated from Christian Brothers College, in St. Joseph, in 1909. He was a deputy circuit clerk of Buchanan County, Missouri from 1911 to 1917, and read law to be admitted to the bar in 1916, entering private practice in St. Joseph from 1917 to 1926. He was city counselor to the city of St. Joseph from 1926 to 1930.

== Congressional service ==
Duncan served as delegate to the 1932 Democratic National Convention. He was elected as a Democrat to the United States House of Representatives of the 73rd United States Congress and to the four succeeding Congresses, serving from March 4, 1933 to January 3, 1943. He served as Chairman of the Democratic Caucus for the 77th United States Congress, but was unsuccessful in his candidacy for reelection in 1942 to the 78th United States Congress.

== Federal judicial service ==
On July 8, 1943, Duncan was nominated by President Franklin D. Roosevelt to a new joint seat on the United States District Court for the Eastern District of Missouri and the United States District Court for the Western District of Missouri created by 56 Stat. 1083. He was confirmed by the United States Senate on July 8, 1943, and received his commission on July 14, 1943. He served as Chief Judge of the Western District from 1954 to 1959, assuming senior status on May 31, 1965, and serving in that capacity until his death on August 1, 1974, in Kansas City, Missouri, where he resided. He was interred in Memorial Park Cemetery in St. Joseph.

== Sources ==
- United States Congress. "Richard M. Duncan (id: D000536)". Biographical Directory of the United States Congress.
- Richard M. Duncan at the Biographical Directory of Federal Judges, a publication of the Federal Judicial Center.

U.S. House of Representatives
Preceded by District established	Member of the U.S. House of Representatives from Missouri's at-large congressional district 1933–1935	Succeeded by District abolished
Preceded by Jacob L. Milligan	Member of the U.S. House of Representatives from Missouri's 3rd congressional district 1935–1943	Succeeded by William Clay Cole
Legal offices
Preceded by Seat established by 56 Stat. 1083	Judge of the United States District Court for the Eastern District of Missouri; Judge of the United States District Court for the Western District of Missouri; 1943–1965	Succeeded by William Robert Collinson
Preceded by Albert L. Reeves	Chief Judge of the United States District Court for the Western District of Missouri; 1954–1959	Succeeded by Albert Alphonso Ridge
