= D. Brook Bartlett =

American judge

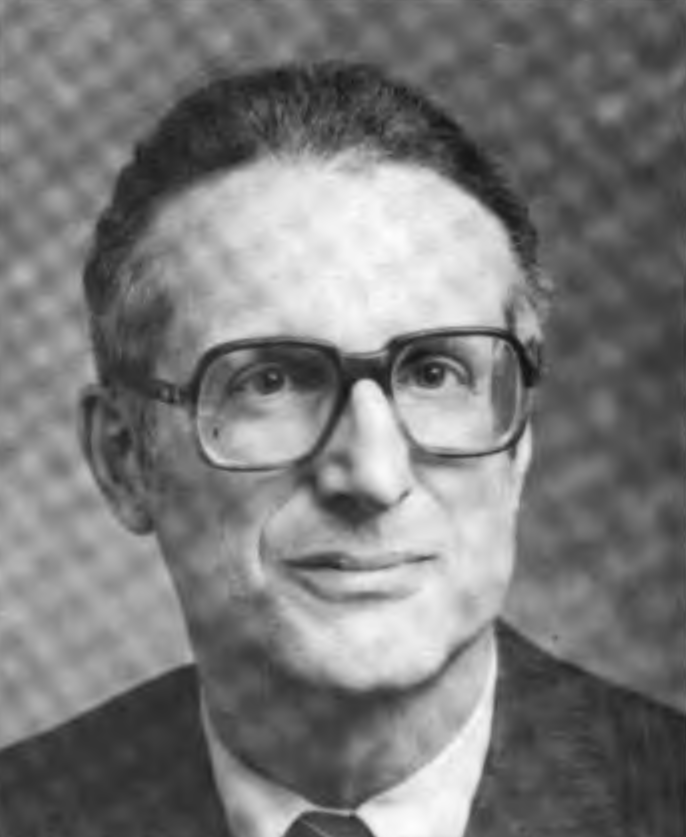

Chief Judge of the United States District Court for the Western District of Missouri
- In office 1995–2000
- Preceded by: Joseph Edward Stevens, Jr.
- Succeeded by: Dean Whipple

Judge of the United States District Court for the Western District of Missouri
- In office September 19, 1981 – January 21, 2000
- Appointed by: Ronald Reagan
- Preceded by: John Watkins Oliver
- Succeeded by: Richard Everett Dorr

Personal details
- Born: Daniel Brook Bartlett; February 22, 1937 Kansas City, Missouri, U.S.
- Died: January 21, 2000 (aged 62) Kansas City, Missouri, U.S.
- Education: Princeton University (BA); Stanford University (LLB)

Daniel Brook Bartlett (February 22, 1937 – January 21, 2000) was a United States district judge of the United States District Court for the Western District of Missouri.

== Education and career ==
Born and raised in Kansas City, Missouri, Bartlett graduated from the Pembroke Country-Day School in 1955, and received a Bachelor of Arts degree from Princeton University in 1959 and a Bachelor of Laws from Stanford Law School in 1962. He was in private practice in Kansas City from 1962 to 1969, after which he served in the office of the Missouri Attorney General until 1977, first as an assistant attorney general until 1973 and then as first assistant Attorney General. From 1977 to 1981, he was in private practice in Kansas City.

== Federal judicial service ==
On July 9, 1981, President Ronald Reagan nominated Bartlett to be a federal judge on the United States District Court for the Western District of Missouri in Kansas City, for a seat vacated by Judge John Watkins Oliver. The United States Senate confirmed Bartlett on September 16, 1981, and he received his commission on September 19, 1981. Between 1995 and 2000, he served as Chief Judge.

== Death ==
He died of multiple myeloma, a form of cancer, in Kansas City, Missouri on January 21, 2000, about three years after he had been diagnosed in January 1997.

== Sources ==
Legal offices
Preceded by John Watkins Oliver	Judge of the United States District Court for the Western District of Missouri; 1981–2000	Succeeded by Richard Everett Dorr
Preceded by Joseph Edward Stevens, Jr.	Chief Judge of the United States District Court for the Western District of Missouri; 1995–2000	Succeeded by Dean Whipple
