= M. Douglas Harpool =

American judge (born 1956)

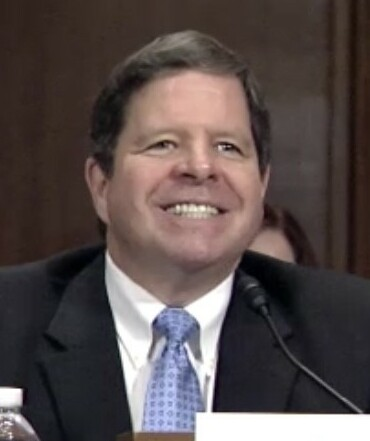
- Harpool in 2013

Senior Judge of the United States District Court for the Western District of Missouri
- Incumbent
- Assumed office February 4, 2026

Judge of the United States District Court for the Western District of Missouri
- In office March 28, 2014 – February 4, 2026
- Appointed by: Barack Obama
- Preceded by: Richard Everett Dorr
- Succeeded by: Megan Benton

Member of the Missouri House of Representatives from the 134th district
- In office January 5, 1983 – January 6, 1993
- Preceded by: Robert Jackson
- Succeeded by: Norma Champion

Personal details
- Born: Mark Douglas Harpool; 1956 (age 69–70) Springfield, Missouri, U.S.
- Party: Democratic
- Spouse: Cindy McCord (m. 1978)
- Children: 6
- Education: Southwest Missouri State University (BS); University of Missouri (JD)

Mark Douglas "Doug" Harpool (born 1956) is a senior United States district judge of the United States District Court for the Western District of Missouri. He also has been a Democratic American politician, and a former member of the Missouri House of Representatives from southwest Missouri's 134th district. He served five terms from January 5, 1983, to January 6, 1993.

== Biography ==
Harpool was born in 1956 in Springfield, Missouri. He received a Bachelor of Science degree, cum laude, in 1977 from Southwest Missouri State University. He received a Juris Doctor in 1980 from the University of Missouri Columbia School of Law. From 1983 to 1993, he served as a member of the Missouri House of Representatives. From 1980 to 2001, he served at Daniel, Clampett, Lilly, Dalton, Powell & Cunningham. From 2002 to 2003, he served at Cunningham, Harpool & Cardonnier LLC. From 2004 to 2006, he served at Lathrop & Gage LLP. He ran unsuccessfully for the Missouri Senate from the 30th district in 2006. From 2006 to 2014, he was a shareholder at Baird, Lightner, Millsap & Harpool, PC, in Springfield, where he handled a broad array of civil litigation. Harpool was the plaintiff's lawyer of a high-profile court case involving the Republic School District.

=== Personal ===
He married the former Cindy McCord in 1978 and they have six children.

== State senate redistricting ==
Harpool was the chair of the Missouri Senate redistricting committee. On August 18, 2011 the map submitted by the committee was turned down by the Republican members of the committee. While on the committee he focused on population growth and census data to redraw the district boundaries. Senator John Lamping and many in opposition voiced their concerns over the proposed map because it would eliminate his district altogether. Citing population trends and census data, Harpool argued that Saint Louis County must lose the seat in order for fair representation to the faster-growing areas like Greene, Stone, and Barry counties in southwestern Missouri.

== Federal judicial service ==
On August 1, 2013, President Barack Obama nominated Harpool to serve as a United States District Judge of the United States District Court for the Western District of Missouri, to the seat vacated by Judge Richard Everett Dorr, who died on April 24, 2013. His nomination passed through the Senate Judiciary Committee. On Thursday March 13, 2014 Senate Majority Leader Harry Reid filed a motion to invoke cloture on the nomination. On March 26, 2014, cloture was invoked by a 56–43 vote. He was later confirmed that same day by a 93–5 vote. He received his judicial commission on March 28, 2014.

On October 23, 2025, Harpool informed the Trump administration that he would assume senior status upon confirmation of a successor.

== Sources ==
- "Doug Harpools' Official Press Release" (Press release). Judy Bruner. 2006-03-03.
- "Mo. Senate redistricting panel gives up, will let judges redraw map". STL Public Radio. 2011-08-16.

Legal offices
Preceded by Richard Everett Dorr	Judge of the United States District Court for the Western District of Missouri; 2014–2026	Succeeded by Megan Benton
