= Ortrie D. Smith =

American judge (born 1946)

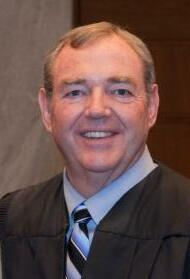
- Smith in 2012

Senior Judge of the United States District Court for the Western District of Missouri
- Incumbent
- Assumed office April 30, 2011

Judge of the United States District Court for the Western District of Missouri
- In office August 14, 1995 – April 30, 2011
- Appointed by: Bill Clinton
- Preceded by: Howard F. Sachs
- Succeeded by: Beth Phillips

Personal details
- Born: April 30, 1946 (age 79) Jonesboro, Arkansas, U.S.
- Education: University of Missouri, Columbia (BA); University of Missouri, Kansas City (JD)

Ortrie Dale Smith (born April 30, 1946) is a senior United States district judge of the United States District Court for the Western District of Missouri.

== Education and career ==
Born in Jonesboro, Arkansas, Smith received a Bachelor of Arts degree from the University of Missouri-Columbia in 1968 and a Juris Doctor from the University of Missouri-Kansas City School of Law in 1971. He was in private practice in Nevada, Missouri from 1971 to 1995.

== Federal judicial service ==
On June 30, 1995, Smith was nominated by President Bill Clinton to a seat on the United States District Court for the Western District of Missouri vacated by Howard F. Sachs. Smith was confirmed by the United States Senate on August 11, 1995, and received his commission on August 14, 1995. He took senior status on April 30, 2011.

Legal offices
Preceded by Howard F. Sachs	Judge of the United States District Court for the Western District of Missouri; 1995–2011	Succeeded by Beth Phillips
