= University of Missouri–Kansas City School of Law =

Public law school in Kansas City, Missouri, US

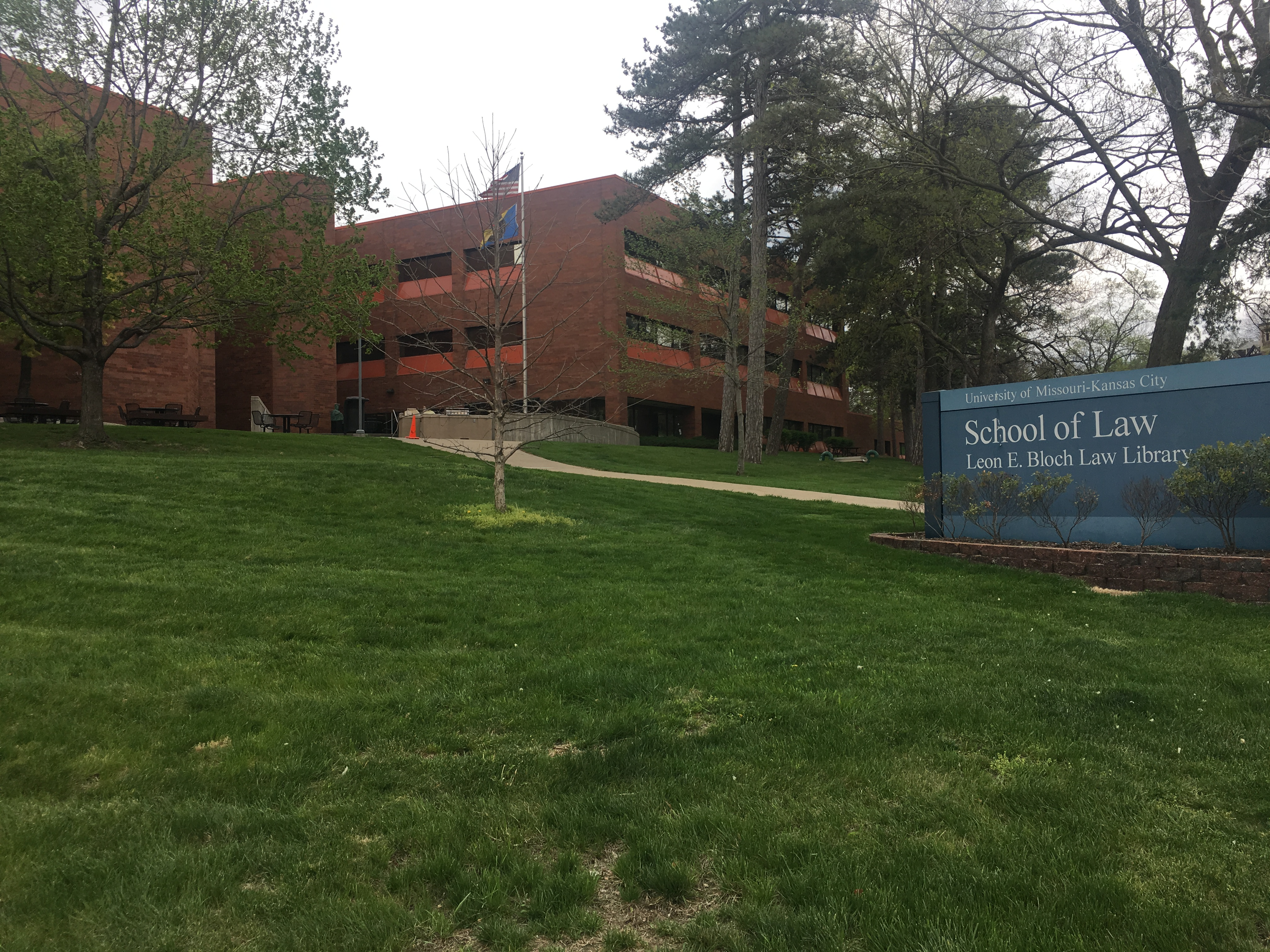
- Motto: Powered by Experience
- Established: 1895; 131 years ago
- School type: Public
- Dean: Lumen N. Mulligan
- Location: Kansas City, Missouri, U.S. 39°01′57″N 94°34′55″W
- Enrollment: 425 (J.D., LL.M, Full & Part-Time Students)
- Faculty: 47
- USNWR ranking: 99th (2025)
- Bar pass rate: 84.13% (for first time bar exam takers in 2024)
- Website: www.law.umkc.edu
- ABA profile

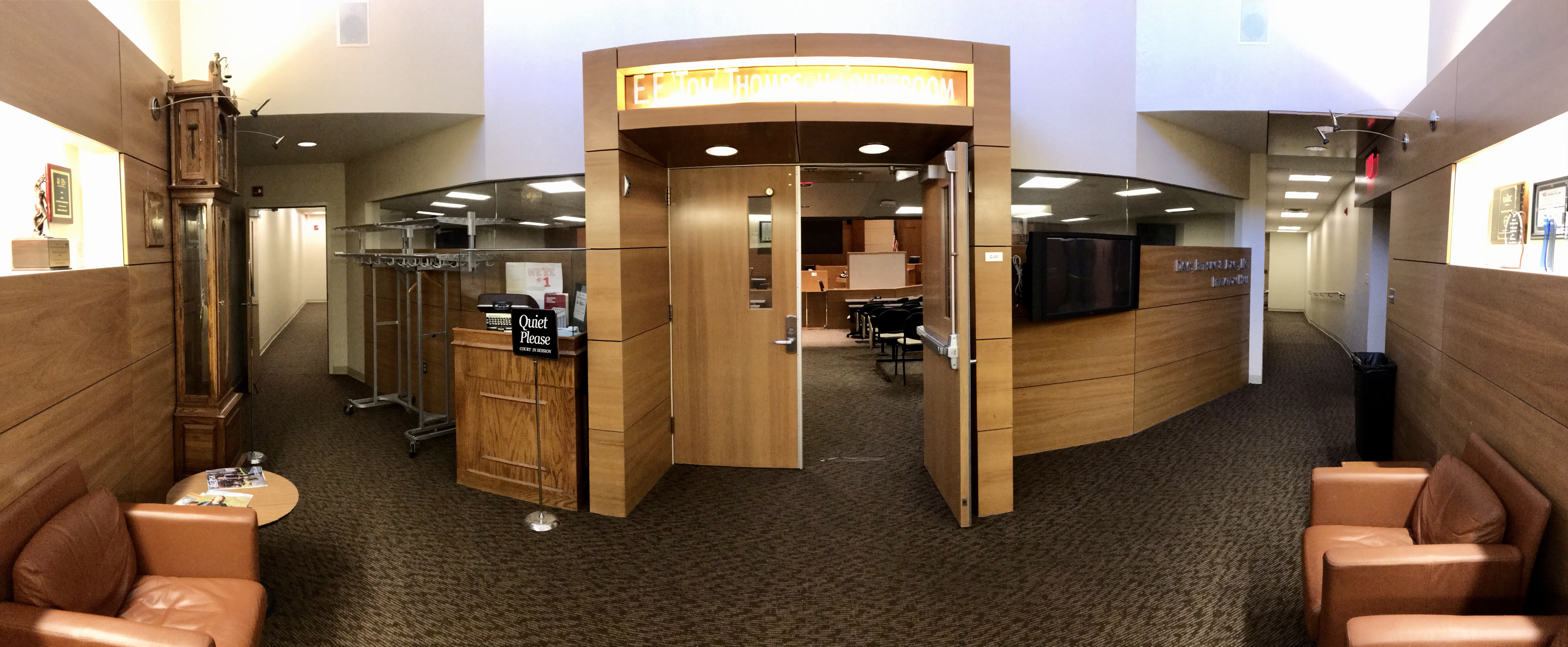
The lobby outside of the E.E. Thompson Courtroom, located inside the law school

The University of Missouri–Kansas City School of Law is the law school of the University of Missouri–Kansas City. It is located on the university's main campus in Kansas City, Missouri, near the Country Club Plaza.

It was founded in 1895 as the Kansas City School of Law, a private, independent law school located in Downtown Kansas City, and was purchased by the University of Missouri-Kansas City in 1938. The law school moved to UMKC's main campus soon after, where it is accredited by the American Bar Association and is a member of the Association of American Law Schools.

== History ==
It is one of four law schools in Missouri (Saint Louis University School of Law, University of Missouri School of Law, Washington University School of Law). It is one of seven American law schools to have had both a President of the United States (Harry S. Truman) and a Justice of the Supreme Court of the United States (Charles Evans Whittaker) attend. Truman attended but did not graduate from the law school and never practiced law. However, Truman served as the presiding judge at the historic Truman Courthouse in Independence, MO. In February 2017, UMKC received forty linear feet of private papers for Justice Charles Evan Whittaker from the U.S. Supreme Court Archive. The archivist is curating these documents at the Miller Nichols LaBudde Special Collections Library.

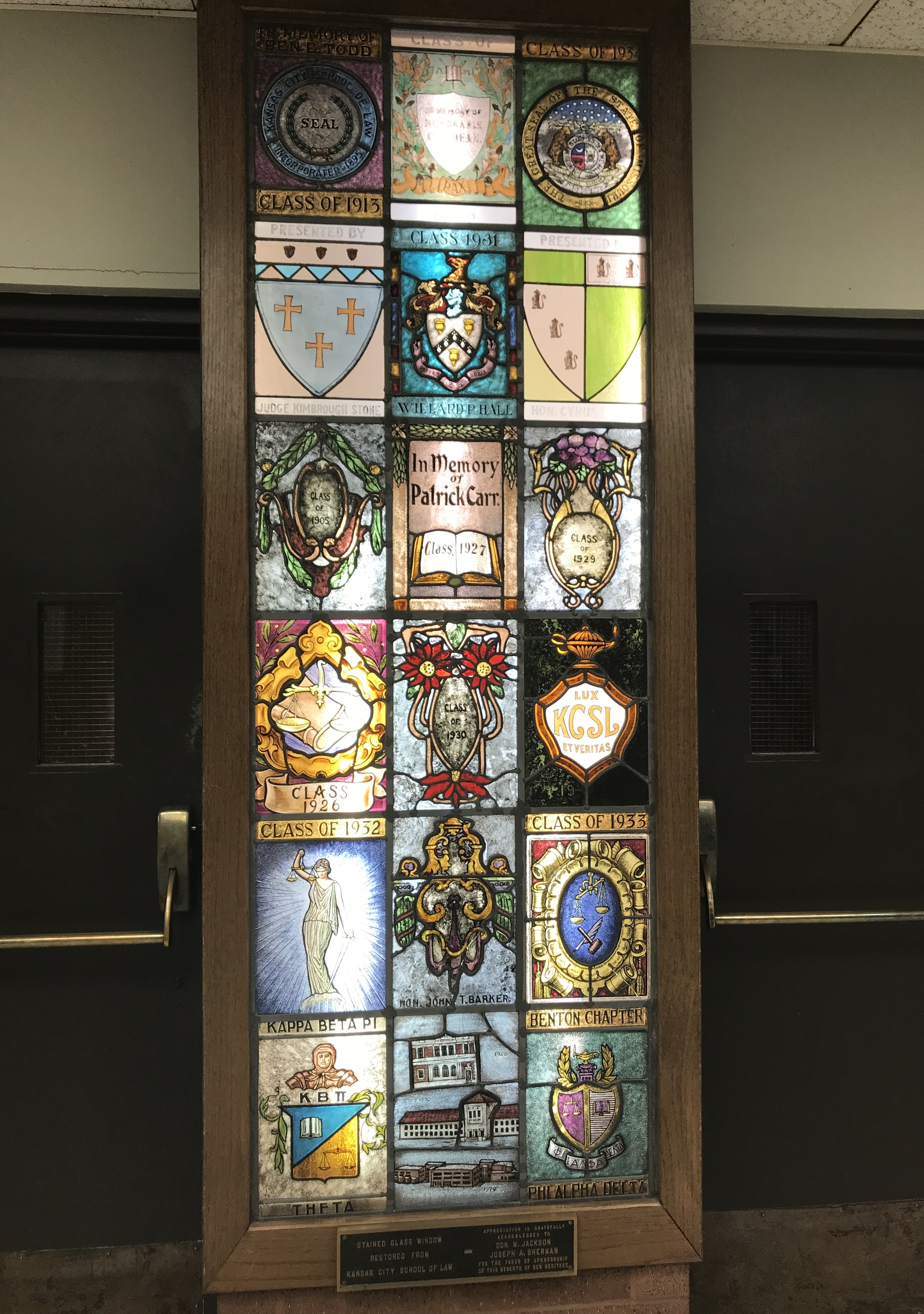
A stained glass window inside the UMKC School of Law which depicts various classes and locations of the law school throughout its history. The window was taken from the previous home of the law school when the current facility was built.

== Admissions ==
For the class entering in 2024, the law school accepted 365 out of 590 applicants (a 61.86% acceptance rate), with 138 of those accepted enrolling, a 37.81% yield rate (the percentage of accepted students who enrolled). One student was not included in the acceptance statistics. The class consists of 139 students. The median LSAT score was 155 and the median undergraduate GPA was 3.51. Five students were not included in the GPA calculation. The reported 25th/75th percentile LSAT scores and GPAs were 152/158 and 3.18/3.78.

== Rankings ==
The school is ranked No.99 out of 199 ABA accredited law schools by U.S. News & World Report in its 2025 Annual Rankings. In April 2018 a student team from UMKC was recognized as National Champion and also won the Best Draft Award at the Transactional LawMeet, a transactional moot court competition for law school students.

== Clinics ==
Eight clinical programs permit students, acting under faculty supervision, to develop legal skills and learn professional values in actual practice settings. The Midwest Innocence Project originated at the UMKC School of Law as a clinic in 2001.

- Abandoned Housing Clinic
- Advocacy Master Class
- Appellate Practice (Unemployment) Clinic
- Child & Family Services Clinic
- Death Penalty Clinic
- Entrepreneurial Legal Services Clinic
- Guardian Ad Litem Workshop
- Intellectual Property Clinic
- Kansas City Tax Clinic
- UMKC Innocence Project / Wrongful Convictions Clinic

== Publications ==
- The UMKC Law Review
- Journal of the American Academy of Matrimonial Lawyers

== Employment ==
According to UMKC School of Law's official 2017 ABA-required disclosures, 74.07% of the Class of 2017 obtained full-time, long-term, bar passage required ten months after graduation. The same 2017 ABA-required disclosures reports that 89.62% of the Class of 2017 obtained bar passage required or J.D. advantage positions. UMKC School of Law's Law School Transparency under-employment score is 23%, indicating the percentage of the Class of 2016 unemployed, pursuing an additional degree, or working in a non-professional, short-term, or part-time job ten months after graduation.

== Costs ==
Tuition and fees for 2017-2018, full-time, first year law students who are Missouri residents: $19,038/year. Non-resident fees are an additional $16,318, but many students qualify for non-resident fee scholarships that allow them to pay the in-state rate while they establish Missouri residency. The approximate cost of attendance (including the cost of tuition, fees, and living expenses) at UMKC School of Law for the nine-month academic year for a typical first-year, Missouri resident, law student living off campus is $34,488.

== Notable alumni ==
=== Politics ===
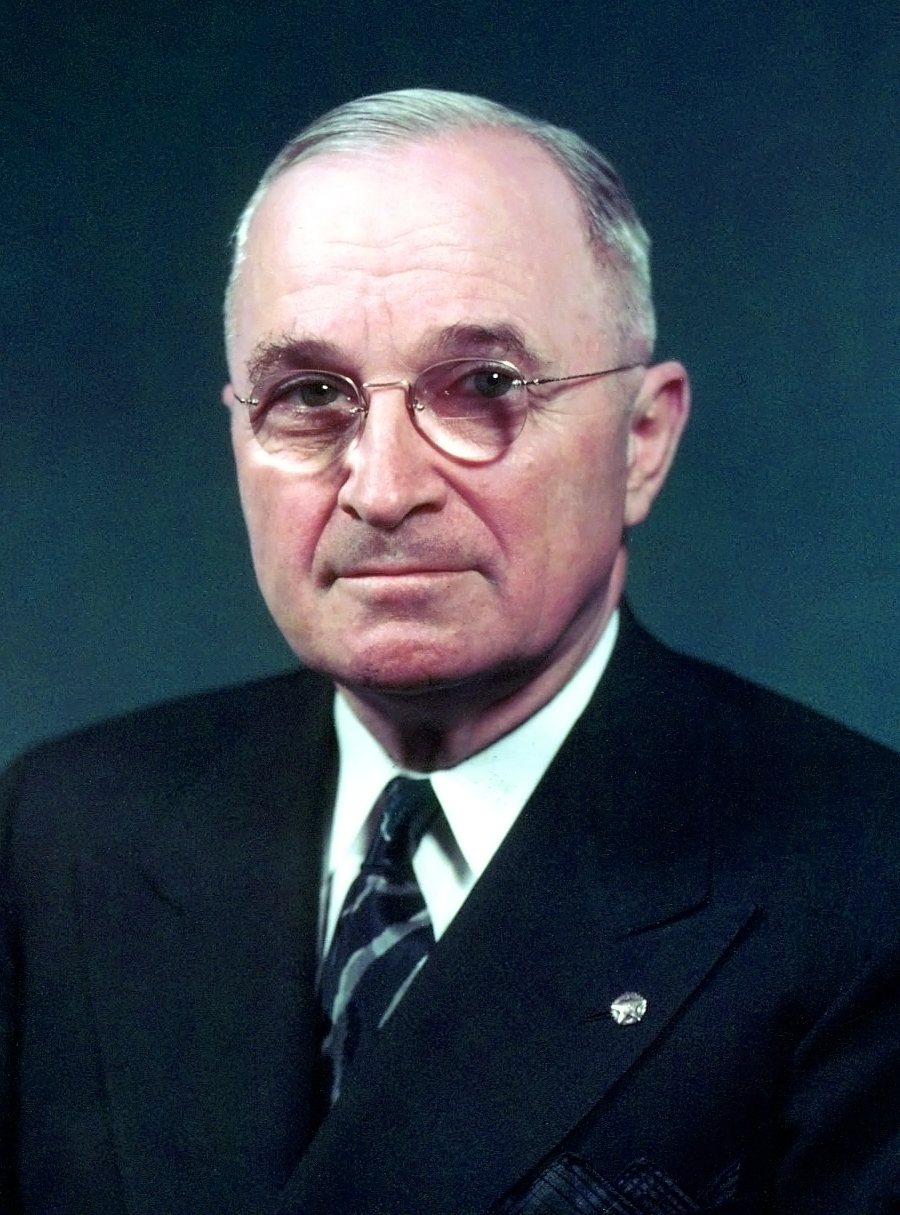
Harry S. Truman

- Edwin J. Brown (class of 1899), Mayor of Seattle
- Barbara Allen (class of 1985), Kansas politician
- Edward F. Arn (class of 1932), 32nd Governor of Kansas
- James P. Aylward (class of 1908), Missouri politician associated with the Tom Pendergast political machine
- William M. Boyle (class of 1926), Chairman, Democratic National Committee (1949–51)
- Hilary A. Bush (class of 1932), Lieutenant Governor of Missouri (1961–65)
- George H. Combs, Jr. (class of 1921), Missouri politician
- Scott Ferris (class of 1901), Oklahoma politician
- Jolie Justus (class of 1998), Missouri politician
- Clarence M. Kelley (class of 1940), Director of the Federal Bureau of Investigation (1973–78)
- Wesley Lloyd (class of 1906), U.S. Representative from Washington
- Susan Montee (class of 2000), State Auditor of Missouri (2007–2011)
- Edward H. Moore (class of 1900), U.S. Senator from Oklahoma (1942–49)
- Jim Polsinelli (class of 1969), founder Polsinelli law firm
- William J. Randall (class of 1936), Missouri politician
- Katheryn Shields (class of 1978), Jackson County, Missouri Executive (1995–2006)
- Roger C. Slaughter (class of 1932), Missouri politician
- Harry S. Truman (attended), 33rd President of the United States (1945–53); 34th Vice President of the United States (1945); U.S. Senator from Missouri (1935–1945)
- Sarah Lucille Turner (class of 1922), one of the first two women elected to the Missouri General Assembly

=== Judiciary ===
- Bower Slack Broaddus (class of 1910), Judge, United States District Courts for the Western District of Oklahoma, Eastern District of Oklahoma, and Northern District of Oklahoma (1940–49)
- Wesley E. Brown (class of 1933), Judge, United States District Court for the District of Kansas (1962–2012) (was oldest serving federal judge at 103 years old)
- Gary A. Fenner (class of 1973), Judge, United States District Court for the Western District of Missouri (1996–present)
- Zel Fischer (class of 1988), Judge, Supreme Court of Missouri (2008–present)
- Fernando J. Gaitan Jr. (class of 1974), Judge, United States District Court for the Western District of Missouri (1991–present)
- Shelby Highsmith (class of 1958), Judge, United States District Court for the Southern District of Florida (1991–2002)
- Rubey Mosley Hulen (class of 1914), Judge, United States District Court for the Eastern District of Missouri (1943–56)
- Charles Henry Leavy (class of 1912), Judge, United States District Court for the Western District of Washington (1942–51)
- Arthur Johnson Mellott (class of 1917), Judge, United States District Court for the District of Kansas (1947–57)
- Ross Rizley (class of 1915), Judge, United States District Courts for the Western District of Oklahoma, (1956–69)
- Edward D. Robertson, Jr. (class of 1977), Judge, Supreme Court of Missouri (1985–98) (Chief Justice, 1991–93)
- Ortrie D. Smith (class of 1971), Judge, United States District Court for the Western District of Missouri (1995–present)
- Melissa Taylor Standridge (class of 1993), Justice, Kansas Supreme Court (2020–present)
- Arthur Jehu Stanley, Jr. (class of 1928), Judge, United States District Court for the District of Kansas (1958–71)
- Dean Whipple (class of 1965), Judge, United States District Court for the Western District of Missouri (1987–2007)
- Ronnie L. White (class of 1983), Judge, Supreme Court of Missouri (1995–2007) (Chief Justice, 2003–05)
- Charles Evans Whittaker (class of 1924), Associate Justice, U.S. Supreme Court (1957–62)
- Stephen R. Bough (class of 1997), Judge, United States District Court for the Western District of Missouri (2014-present)
- Frances Tydingco-Gatewood (class of 1983), Chief Judge, District Court of Guam (2006-present); former Associate Justice, Supreme Court of Guam (2002-06)

=== Business and practice ===
- Lyda Conley (class of 1902), first woman admitted to the Kansas Bar and first Native American woman to argue before the U.S. Supreme Court; championed Native American causes
- Jay B. Dillingham (class of 1935), president of the Kansas City Stockyards and president of the Chambers of Commerce for both Kansas City, Missouri, and Kansas City, Kansas.
- Donald Fehr (class of 1973), Executive Director, Major League Baseball Players Association (1986–2009) and National Hockey League Players' Association (2012–2023)
- Thomas Calloway Lea, Jr. (class of 1898), noted Texas criminal lawyer
- Bob Stein (class of 1973), Kansas City Chiefs American football player; youngest person ever to play in a Super Bowl

=== Sports ===
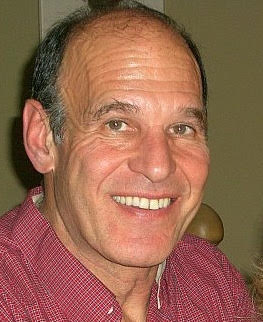
Bob Stein

- Mike Racy (J.D. class of 1992) – former NCAA vice president (1993–2013); 5th commissioner for the Mid-America Intercollegiate Athletics Association
- Bob Stein (born 1948), American football linebacker, College Football Hall of Fame, Jewish Sports Hall of Fame, Super Bowl champion, played for the Kansas City Chiefs, Los Angeles Rams, Minnesota Vikings, and San Diego Chargers graduated in the top 10% of the UMKC Law School.

== Notable faculty and former faculty ==
- Jack Balkin (1984–1988)
- William K. Black
- William Patterson Borland (Kansas City School of Law dean; 1895–1909)
- Pasco Bowman II (dean; 1979–1983)
- Robert Klonoff
- Kris Kobach
- Henry L. Jost (Kansas City School of Law; 1917–1923)
- Steve Leben
- Albert L. Reeves
- Kevin Warren (adjunct professor; 1992–1997)
