= John R. Gibson =

American judge (1925–2014)

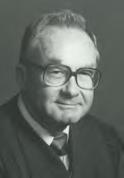

Senior Judge of the United States Court of Appeals for the Eighth Circuit
- In office January 1, 1994 – April 19, 2014

Judge of the United States Court of Appeals for the Eighth Circuit
- In office March 9, 1982 – January 1, 1994
- Appointed by: Ronald Reagan
- Preceded by: Floyd Robert Gibson
- Succeeded by: Diana E. Murphy

Judge of the United States District Court for the Western District of Missouri
- In office September 19, 1981 – March 30, 1982
- Appointed by: Ronald Reagan
- Preceded by: Elmo Bolton Hunter
- Succeeded by: Ross Thompson Roberts

Personal details
- Born: John Robert Gibson; December 20, 1925 Springfield, Missouri, U.S.
- Died: April 19, 2014 (aged 88) Reading, Massachusetts, U.S.
- Education: University of Missouri (AB, JD)

John Robert Gibson (December 20, 1925 – April 19, 2014) was a United States circuit judge of the United States Court of Appeals for the Eighth Circuit and a United States district judge of the United States District Court for the Western District of Missouri.

== Early life and education ==
Born in Springfield, Missouri, Gibson was a sergeant in the United States Army from 1944 to 1946. He received an Artium Baccalaureus degree in 1949 from the University of Missouri, where he was a member of Tau Kappa Epsilon fraternity, followed by a Juris Doctor from the University of Missouri School of Law in 1952. He was in private practice of law in Kansas City, Missouri from 1952 to 1981.

== Federal judicial service ==
Gibson was nominated by President Ronald Reagan on July 9, 1981, to a seat on the United States District Court for the Western District of Missouri vacated by Judge Elmo Bolton Hunter. Confirmed by the United States Senate on September 16, 1981, Gibson received his commission three days later. His service was terminated on March 30, 1982, due to elevation to the court of appeals.

On February 2, 1982, Gibson was nominated by Reagan to a seat on the United States Court of Appeals for the Eighth Circuit that had been vacated by Judge Floyd Robert Gibson, who had assumed senior status. President Jimmy Carter previously had nominated Howard F. Sachs to the seat, but Sachs' nomination was not acted upon by the United States Senate before Carter's presidency ended, and Reagan chose not to renominate Sachs. Reagan initially had brought forth the name of Hallmark Cards associate general counsel Judith Whittaker (born June 12, 1938) as a nominee to replace Floyd Gibson. However, after it emerged that Whittaker had supported the Equal Rights Amendment, conservatives opposing her nomination launched a letter-writing campaign objecting to her nomination, and Whittaker eventually withdrew her name from consideration. On March 4, 1982, the Senate confirmed Gibson and he received his commission on March 9, 1982. Gibson assumed senior status on January 1, 1994 and died on April 19, 2014.

== See also ==
- Jimmy Carter judicial appointment controversies

== Sources ==
Legal offices
Preceded by Elmo Bolton Hunter	Judge of the United States District Court for the Western District of Missouri; 1981–1982	Succeeded by Ross Thompson Roberts
Preceded by Floyd Robert Gibson	Judge of the United States Court of Appeals for the Eighth Circuit; 1982–1994	Succeeded by Diana E. Murphy
