= Richard Everett Dorr =

American judge (1943–2013)

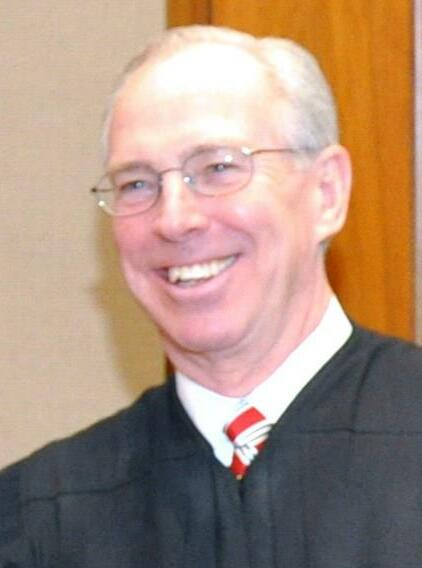

Judge of the United States District Court for the Western District of Missouri
- In office August 2, 2002 – April 24, 2013
- Appointed by: George W. Bush
- Preceded by: D. Brook Bartlett
- Succeeded by: M. Douglas Harpool

Personal details
- Born: Richard Everett Dorr; August 26, 1943 Jefferson City, Missouri, U.S.
- Died: April 24, 2013 (aged 69) Houston, Texas, U.S.
- Education: University of Illinois at Urbana–Champaign (BS); University of Missouri School of Law (JD)

Richard Everett Dorr (August 26, 1943 – April 24, 2013) was a United States district judge of the United States District Court for the Western District of Missouri.

== Education and career ==
Born in Jefferson City, Missouri, Dorr received a Bachelor of Science degree from the University of Illinois at Urbana–Champaign in 1965 and a Juris Doctor from the University of Missouri School of Law in Columbia, Missouri, in 1968. He was in the United States Air Force JAG Corps from 1968 to 1973, and continued to serve in that capacity as a reservist from 1974 to 1990. He was an assistant attorney general in the Missouri Attorney General's Office in 1968. He was in private practice in Springfield, Missouri, from 1973 to 2002.

== District court service ==
On March 21, 2002, Dorr was nominated by President George W. Bush to a seat on the United States District Court for the Western District of Missouri vacated by D. Brook Bartlett. Dorr was confirmed by the United States Senate on August 1, 2002, and received his commission on August 2, 2002. On April 24, 2013, Dorr died from cancer in Houston, where he was being treated.

== Sources ==
Legal offices
Preceded by D. Brook Bartlett	Judge of the United States District Court for the Western District of Missouri; 2002–2013	Succeeded by M. Douglas Harpool
