= Albert L. Reeves =

American judge

Senior Judge of the United States District Court for the Western District of Missouri
- In office February 2, 1954 – March 24, 1971

Chief Judge of the United States District Court for the Western District of Missouri
- In office 1948–1954
- Preceded by: Office established
- Succeeded by: Richard M. Duncan

Judge of the United States District Court for the Western District of Missouri
- In office June 24, 1923 – February 2, 1954
- Appointed by: Warren G. Harding
- Preceded by: Seat established 42 Stat. 837
- Succeeded by: Charles Evans Whittaker

Personal details
- Born: Albert L. Reeves; December 21, 1873 Steelville, Missouri, U.S.
- Died: March 24, 1971 (aged 97) Dunedin, Florida, U.S.
- Education: Steelville College (A.B.) read law

Albert L. Reeves (December 21, 1873 – March 24, 1971) was a United States district judge of the United States District Court for the Western District of Missouri.

== Education and career ==
Born in Steelville, Missouri, Reeves received an Artium Baccalaureus degree from Steelville College in 1898 and read law in 1899. He entered private practice in Steelville in 1899, later moving his practice to Kansas City, Missouri. He was a member of the Missouri House of Representatives from 1901 to 1902. He was counsel to the Missouri State Insurance Department from 1909 to 1913, and a member of the State Civil Service Commission in Kansas City from 1916 to 1917. He was a commissioner for the Supreme Court of Missouri from 1921 to 1923. He was also a lecturer at the Kansas City Dental College and at the Kansas City School of Law (now the University of Missouri–Kansas City School of Law).

== Federal judicial service ==
Reeves was nominated by President Warren G. Harding on January 16, 1923, to the United States District Court for the Western District of Missouri, to a new seat authorized by 42 Stat. 837. He was confirmed by the United States Senate on January 24, 1923, and received his commission the same day. He served as Chief Judge from 1948 to 1954. He assumed senior status on February 2, 1954. His service terminated on March 24, 1971, due to his death in Dunedin, Florida.

== See also ==
- List of United States federal judges by longevity of service

== Sources ==
Legal offices
Preceded by Seat established by 42 Stat. 837	Judge of the United States District Court for the Western District of Missouri; 1923–1954	Succeeded by Charles Evans Whittaker
Preceded by Office established	Chief Judge of the United States District Court for the Western District of Missouri; 1948–1954	Succeeded by Richard M. Duncan
