= Scott Olin Wright =

American judge

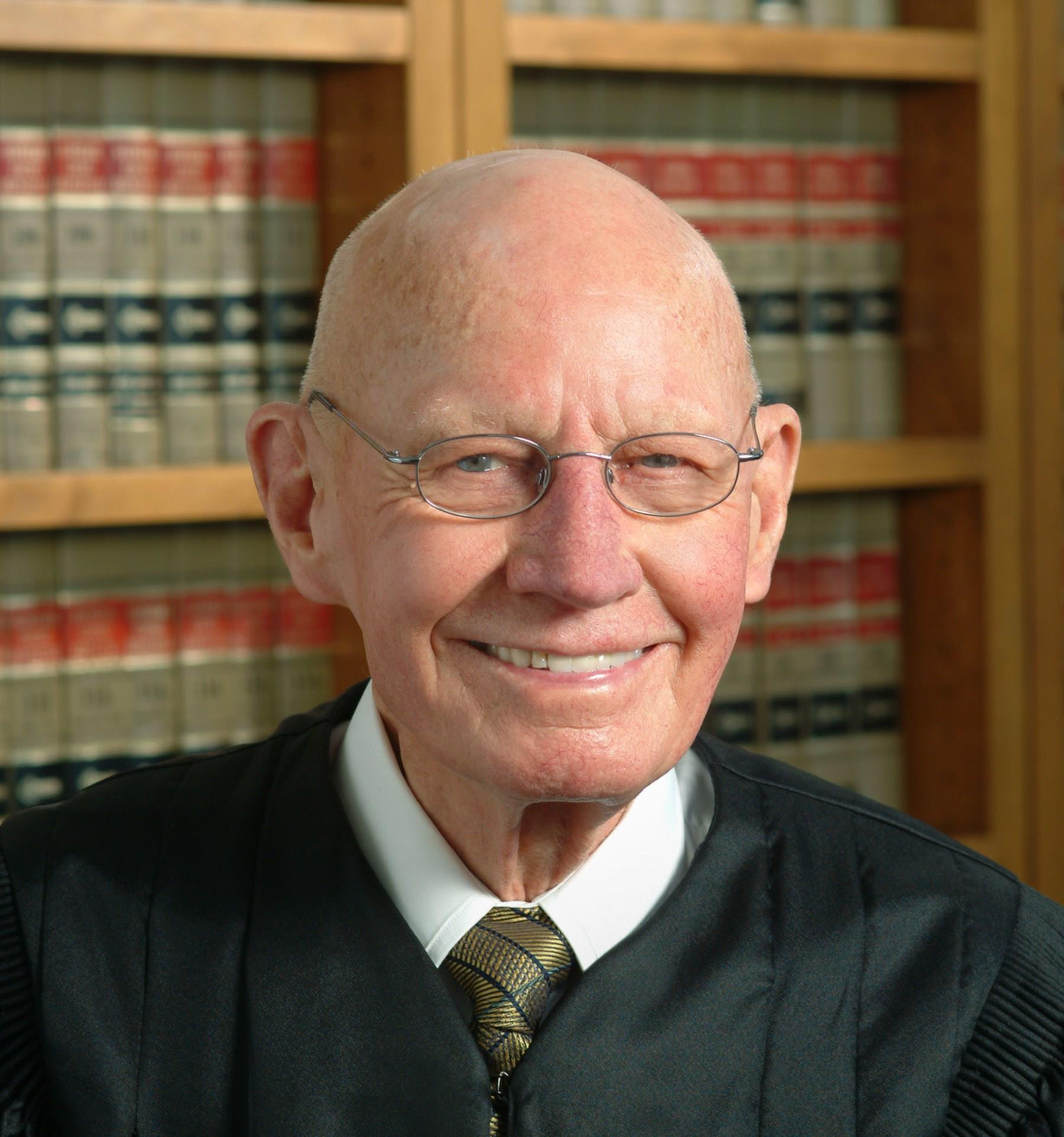

Senior Judge of the United States District Court for the Western District of Missouri
- In office October 5, 1991 – July 11, 2016

Chief Judge of the United States District Court for the Western District of Missouri
- In office 1985–1990
- Preceded by: Russell Gentry Clark
- Succeeded by: Howard F. Sachs

Judge of the United States District Court for the Western District of Missouri
- In office September 26, 1979 – October 5, 1991
- Appointed by: Jimmy Carter
- Preceded by: Seat established by 92 Stat. 1629
- Succeeded by: Gary A. Fenner

Personal details
- Born: Scott Olin Wright; January 15, 1923 Haigler, Nebraska, U.S.
- Died: July 11, 2016 (aged 93) Kansas City, Missouri, U.S.
- Spouse: Shirley
- Education: University of Missouri School of Law (LLB)

Scott Olin Wright (January 15, 1923 – July 11, 2016) was a United States district judge of the United States District Court for the Western District of Missouri.

== Education and career ==
Wright was born in Haigler, Nebraska. During World War II, he was a cadet in the United States Navy from 1942 to 1943, and then a United States Marine Corps Captain and Aviator from 1943 to 1946. Following the war, Wright received a Bachelor of Laws from University of Missouri School of Law in Columbia, Missouri in 1950. He was in private practice in Columbia from 1950 to 1954, and was a city attorney for Columbia from 1951 to 1953. From 1954 to 1958, he was a prosecutor for Boone County, Missouri, then returned to private practice in Columbia until 1979.

== Federal judicial service ==
On May 24, 1979, Wright was nominated by President Jimmy Carter to a new seat on the United States District Court for the Western District of Missouri created by Congress. He was confirmed by the United States Senate on September 25, 1979, and received his commission the following day. He served as Chief Judge of the Western District of Missouri from 1985 to 1990. He assumed senior status on October 5, 1991, serving in that status until his death on July 11, 2016, in Kansas City, Missouri.

== Book ==
Judge Wright wrote a book in 2007 titled: Never in Doubt: Memoirs of an Uncommon Judge Hardcover – January 1, 2007 by Scott O. Wright

== Donations to the University of Missouri Law School ==
Profits from a book Wright co-authored, "Never in Doubt, Memoirs of an Uncommon Judge,” were donated to the Missouri University Law School. In 2007, Wright also pledged $100,000 to fund a scholarship at the school. “I was happy to do it,” he said at the time. “I feel like the University of Missouri did me a great favor for me by putting me through law school."

== Sources ==
Legal offices
Preceded by Seat established by 92 Stat. 1629	Judge of the United States District Court for the Western District of Missouri; 1979–1991	Succeeded by Gary A. Fenner
Preceded by Russell Gentry Clark	Chief Judge of the United States District Court for the Western District of Missouri; 1985–1990	Succeeded by Howard F. Sachs
