= United States District Court for the Western District of Missouri =

United States federal district court in Missouri

- (W.D. Mo.)
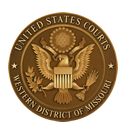

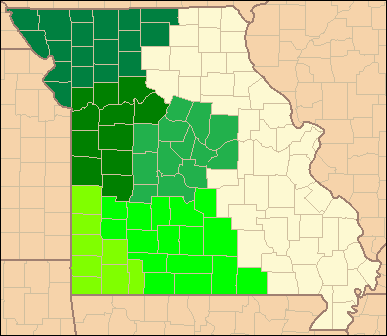
- Location: Charles Evans Whittaker U.S. Courthouse (Kansas City) More locations: Christopher S. Bond Court House (Jefferson City); United States Courthouse (Springfield); St. Joseph; Joplin
- Appeals to: Eighth Circuit
- Established: March 3, 1857
- Judges: 7
- Chief Judge: Brian C. Wimes

Officers of the court
- U.S. Attorney: R. Matthew Price
- U.S. Marshal: Jim Arnott
- www.mow.uscourts.gov

The United States District Court for the Western District of Missouri (in case citations, W.D. Mo.) is the federal judicial district encompassing 66 counties in the western half of the State of Missouri. The Court is based in the Charles Evans Whittaker Courthouse in Kansas City.

As of August 2025, the United States attorney for the Western District of Missouri is R. Matthew Price.

== History ==
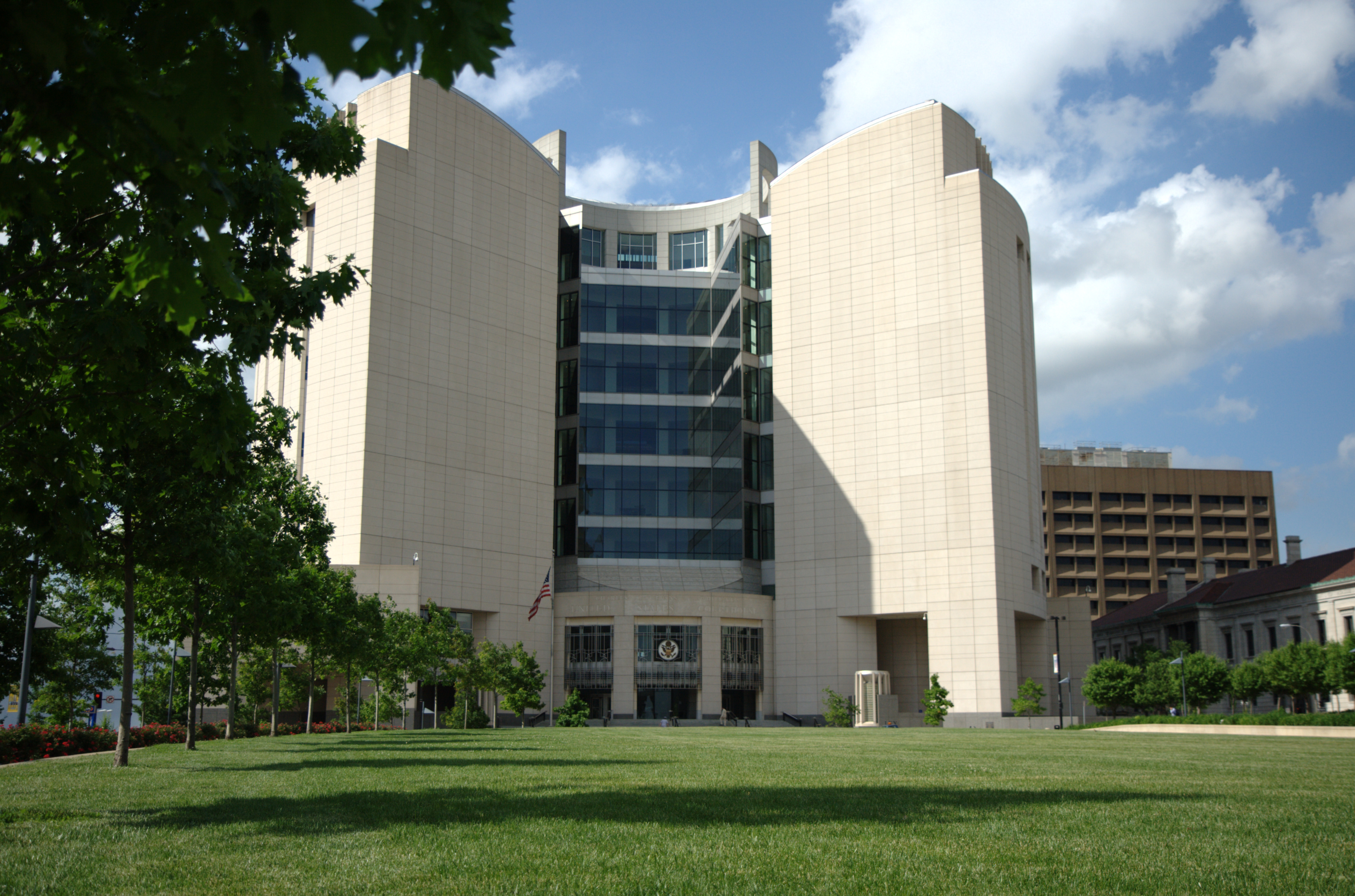
Charles Evans Whittaker Federal Courthouse

Missouri was admitted as a state on August 10, 1821, and the United States Congress established the United States District Court for the District of Missouri on March 16, 1822. The District was assigned to the Eighth Circuit on March 3, 1837. Congress subdivided it into Eastern and Western Districts on March 3, 1857. and has since made only small adjustments to the boundaries of that subdivision. The division was prompted by a substantial increase in the number of admiralty cases arising from traffic on the Mississippi River, which had followed an act of Congress passed in 1845 and upheld by the United States Supreme Court in 1851, extending federal admiralty jurisdiction to inland waterways. These disputes involved "contracts of affreightment, collisions, mariners' wages, and other causes of admiralty jurisdiction", and litigants of matters arising in St. Louis found it inconvenient to travel to Jefferson City for their cases to be tried.

When the District of Missouri was subdivided, Robert William Wells was the sole judge serving the District of Missouri. Wells was then reassigned to serve only the Western District.

== Jurisdiction ==
The district is divided into five divisions: Western (Kansas City), Central (Jefferson City), Southern (Springfield), Southwestern (Joplin), and St. Joseph (St. Joseph). There are divisional clerk's Offices in Jefferson City and Springfield in addition to the primary office in Kansas City. New cases and pleadings in the District Court may be filed in the clerk's offices in Kansas City, Jefferson City, and Springfield; Bankruptcy Court filings, however, only are accepted in the Kansas City clerk's office. The United States Court of Appeals for the Eighth Circuit across Missouri in St. Louis has jurisdiction over decisions appealed from the Western District of Missouri (except for patent claims and claims against the U.S. government under the Tucker Act, which are appealed to the Federal Circuit).

The five court divisions each cover the following counties:

The Western Division covers Bates, Carroll, Cass, Clay, Henry, Jackson, Johnson, Lafayette, Ray, St. Clair, and Saline counties.

The Central Division covers Benton, Boone, Callaway, Camden, Cole, Cooper, Hickory, Howard, Miller, Moniteau, Morgan, Osage, and Pettis counties.

The Southern Division covers Cedar, Christian, Dade, Dallas, Douglas, Greene, Howell, Laclede, Oregon, Ozark, Polk, Pulaski, Taney, Texas, Webster, and Wright counties.

The St. Joseph Division covers Andrew, Atchison, Buchanan, Caldwell, Clinton, Daviess, DeKalb, Gentry, Grundy, Harrison, Holt, Livingston, Mercer, Nodaway, Platte, Putnam, Sullivan, and Worth counties.

The Southwestern Division covers Barry, Barton, Jasper, Lawrence, McDonald, Newton, Stone, and Vernon counties.

== Current judges ==
As of February 10, 2026:

#	Title	Judge	Duty station	Born	Term of service			Appointed by
#	Title	Judge	Duty station	Born	Active	Chief	Senior	Appointed by
36	Chief Judge	Brian C. Wimes (Note: Jointly appointed to the Eastern and Western Districts of Missouri)	Kansas City	1966	2012–present	2026–present	—	Obama
34	District Judge	David Gregory Kays	Kansas City	1962	2008–present	2014–2019	—	G.W. Bush
35	District Judge	Beth Phillips	Kansas City	1969	2012–present	2019–2025	—	Obama
38	District Judge	Stephen R. Bough	Kansas City	1970	2014–present	—	—	Obama
39	District Judge	Roseann A. Ketchmark	Kansas City	1963	2015–present	—	—	Obama
40	District Judge	Josh Divine	None (Note: Judge Divine maintains chambers only in the Eastern District.)	1990	2025–present	—	—	Trump
41	District Judge	Megan Benton	Springfield	1985	2026–present	—	—	Trump
21	Senior Judge	Howard F. Sachs	inactive	1925	1979–1992	1990–1992	1992–present	Carter
27	Senior Judge	Dean Whipple	inactive	1938	1987–2007	2000–2007	2007–present	Reagan
28	Senior Judge	Fernando J. Gaitan Jr.	Kansas City	1948	1991–2014	2007–2014	2014–present	G.H.W. Bush
29	Senior Judge	Ortrie D. Smith	inactive	1946	1995–2011	—	2011–present	Clinton
30	Senior Judge	Gary A. Fenner	Kansas City	1947	1996–2015	—	2015–present	Clinton
31	Senior Judge	Nanette Kay Laughrey	inactive	1946	1996–2011	—	2011–present	Clinton
32	Senior Judge	Rodney W. Sippel	None (Note: Judge Sippel maintains chambers only in the Eastern District.)	1956	1997–2023	—	2023–present	Clinton
37	Senior Judge	M. Douglas Harpool	Springfield	1956	2014–2026	—	2026–present	Obama

== Vacancies and pending nominations ==
Seat	Prior judge's duty station	Seat last held by	Vacancy reason	Date of vacancy	Nominee	Date of nomination
5	Kansas City	David Gregory Kays	Senior status	May 11, 2027	Jesus Osete	September 14, 2026

== Former judges ==
#	Judge	Born–died	Active service	Chief Judge	Senior status	Appointed by	Reason for termination
1	Robert William Wells	1795–1864	1857–1864 (Note: Reassigned from the District of Missouri)	—	—	Jackson/Operation of law	death
2	Arnold Krekel	1815–1888	1865–1888	—	—	Lincoln	retirement
3	John Finis Philips	1834–1919	1888–1910	—	—	Cleveland	retirement
4	Arba Van Valkenburgh	1862–1944	1910–1925	—	—	Taft	elevation
5	Albert L. Reeves	1873–1971	1923–1954	1948–1954	1954–1971	Harding	death
6	Merrill E. Otis	1884–1944	1925–1944 (Note: Recess appointment; formally nominated on December 8, 1925, confirmed by the United States Senate on December 14, 1925, and received commission the same day)	—	—	Coolidge	death
7	John Caskie Collet	1898–1955	1937–1947 (Note: Jointly appointed to the Eastern and Western Districts of Missouri.)	—	—	F. Roosevelt	elevation
8	Richard M. Duncan	1889–1974	1943–1965	1954–1959	1965–1974	F. Roosevelt	death
9	Albert Alphonso Ridge	1898–1967	1945–1961	1959–1961	—	F. Roosevelt	elevation
10	Roy Winfield Harper	1905–1994	1947 (Note: Recess appointment; not confirmed by the Senate. Jointly appointed to the Eastern and Western Districts of Missouri.); 1947–1948 (Note: Received a second recess appointment and was again rejected by the Senate. Jointly appointed to the Eastern and Western Districts of Missouri.); 1948–1971 (Note: Received a third recess appointment; formally nominated on January 13, 1949, confirmed by the Senate on January 31, 1949, and received commission on February 2, 1949. Jointly appointed to the Eastern and Western Districts of Missouri.)	—	1971–1994	Truman; Truman; Truman	not confirmed not confirmed death
11	Charles Evans Whittaker	1901–1973	1954–1956	—	—	Eisenhower	elevation
12	Randle Jasper Smith	1908–1962	1956–1962	1961–1962	—	Eisenhower	death
13	Floyd Robert Gibson	1910–2001	1961–1965	1962–1965	—	Kennedy	elevation
14	William Henry Becker	1909–1992	1961–1977	1965–1977	1977–1992	Kennedy	death
15	John Watkins Oliver	1914–1990	1962–1980	1977–1980	1980–1990	Kennedy	death
16	William Robert Collinson	1912–1995	1965–1980	—	1980–1995	L. Johnson	death
17	Elmo Bolton Hunter	1915–2003	1965–1980	1980	1980–2003	L. Johnson	death
18	Harris Kenneth Wangelin	1913–1987	1970–1983	—	1983–1987	Nixon	death
19	Russell Gentry Clark	1925–2003	1977–1991	1980–1985	1991–2000	Carter	retirement
20	Scott Olin Wright	1923–2016	1979–1991	1985–1990	1991–2016	Carter	death
22	Joseph Edward Stevens Jr.	1928–1998	1981–1995	1992–1995	1995–1998	Reagan	death
23	D. Brook Bartlett	1937–2000	1981–2000	1995–2000	—	Reagan	death
24	John R. Gibson	1925–2014	1981–1982	—	—	Reagan	elevation
25	Ross Thompson Roberts	1938–1987	1982–1987	—	—	Reagan	death
26	Stephen N. Limbaugh Sr.	1927–present	1983–1996	—	1996–2008	Reagan	retirement
33	Richard Everett Dorr	1943–2013	2002–2013	—	—	G.W. Bush	death

== Chief judges ==
Chief judges have administrative responsibilities with respect to their district court. Unlike the Supreme Court, where one justice is specifically nominated to be chief, the office of chief judge rotates among the district court judges. To be chief, a judge must have been in active service on the court for at least one year, be under the age of 65, and have not previously served as chief judge.

A vacancy is filled by the judge highest in seniority among the group of qualified judges. The chief judge serves for a term of seven years, or until age 70, whichever occurs first. The age restrictions are waived if no members of the court would otherwise be qualified for the position.

When the office was created in 1948, the chief judge was the longest-serving judge who had not elected to retire, on what has since 1958 been known as senior status, or declined to serve as chief judge. After August 6, 1959, judges could not become or remain chief after turning 70 years old. The current rules have been in operation since October 1, 1982.

== Succession of seats ==
Seat 1
Seat reassigned from the District of Missouri on March 3, 1857 by 11 Stat. 197
Wells	1857–1864
Krekel	1865–1888
Philips	1888–1910
Van Valkenburgh	1910–1925
Otis	1925–1944
Ridge	1945–1961
Becker	1961–1977
Clark	1977–1991
Gaitan, Jr.	1991–2014
Bough	2014–present

Seat 2
Seat established on September 14, 1922 by 42 Stat. 838 (temporary)
Seat made permanent on August 19, 1935 by 49 Stat. 659
Reeves	1923–1954
Whittaker	1954–1956
R. Smith	1956–1962
Oliver	1962–1980
Bartlett	1981–2000
Dorr	2002–2013
Harpool	2014–2026
Benton	2026–present

Seat 3
Seat established on June 22, 1936 by 49 Stat. 1804 (concurrent with Eastern District)
Collet	1937–1947
Harper	1947–1971
Wangelin	1970–1983
Limbaugh Sr.	1983–1996
Sippel	1997–2023
Divine	2025–present

Seat 4
Seat established on December 24, 1942 by 56 Stat. 1083 (temporary, concurrent with Eastern District)
Seat made permanent on February 10, 1954 by 68 Stat. 8
Duncan	1943–1965
Collinson	1965–1980
Stevens Jr.	1981–1995
Laughrey	1996–2011
Wimes	2012–present

Seat 5
Seat established on May 19, 1961 by 75 Stat. 80
F. Gibson	1961–1965
Hunter	1965–1980
J. Gibson	1981–1982
Roberts	1982–1987
Whipple	1987–2007
Kays	2008–present

Seat 6
Seat established on October 20, 1978 by 92 Stat. 1629
Sachs	1979–1992
O. Smith	1995–2011
Phillips	2012–present

Seat 7
Seat established on October 20, 1978 by 92 Stat. 1629
Wright	1979–1991
Fenner	1996–2015
Ketchmark	2015–present

== United States Attorneys ==
List of U.S. Attorneys since 1857

- Mosby Monroe Parsons (1857–1858)
- Alfred Morrison Lay (1858–1861)
- James J. Clark (1861)
- James O. Broadhead (1861)
- Robert J. Lackey (1861–1864)
- Bennett Pike (1864)
- James S. Botsford (1871–1878)
- L. H. Waters (1878–1882)
- William Warner (1882–1885)
- Ross Guffin (1885)
- Maecenas Eason Benton (1885–1889)
- Elbert E. Kimball (1889)
- George A. Neal (1889–1894)
- John R. Walker (1894–1898)
- William Warner (1898–1905)
- Arba S. Van Valkenburgh (1905–1910)
- Leslie J. Lyons (1910–1913)
- Francis M. Wilson (1913–1920)
- Sam O. Hargus (1920)
- James W. Sullinger (1920–1921)
- Charles C. Madison (1921–1925)
- Roscoe C. Patterson (1925–1929)
- William L. Vandeventer (1929–1934)
- Maurice M. Milligan (1934–1940)
- Richard K. Phelps (1940)
- Maurice M. Milligan (1940–1945)
- Sam M. Wear (1945–1953)
- Edward L. Scheufler (1953–1961)
- F. Russell Millin (1961–1967)
- Calvin K. Hamilton (1967–1969)
- Bert C. Hurn (1969–1977)
- Ronald S. Reed, Jr. (1977–1981)
- J. Whitfield Moody (1981)
- Robert G. Ulrich (1981–1989)
- Thomas M. Larson (1989)
- Jean Paul Bradshaw II (1989–1993)
- Michael A. Jones (1993)
- Marietta Parker (1993)
- Stephen L. Hill, Jr. (1993–2001)
- Todd Graves (2001–2006)
- Bradley Schlozman (2006–2007)
- John F. Wood (2007–2009)
- Beth Phillips (2009–2012)
- David Ketchmark (2012–2013)
- Tammy Dickinson (2013–2017)
- Thomas Larson (2017–2018)
- Timothy A. Garrison (2018–2021)
- Teresa A. Moore (2021–2025)
- Jeffrey P. Ray (2025)
- R. Matthew Price (2025-Present)

== See also ==
- Courts of Missouri
- List of current United States district judges
- List of United States federal courthouses in Missouri
