= Missouri Circuit Courts =

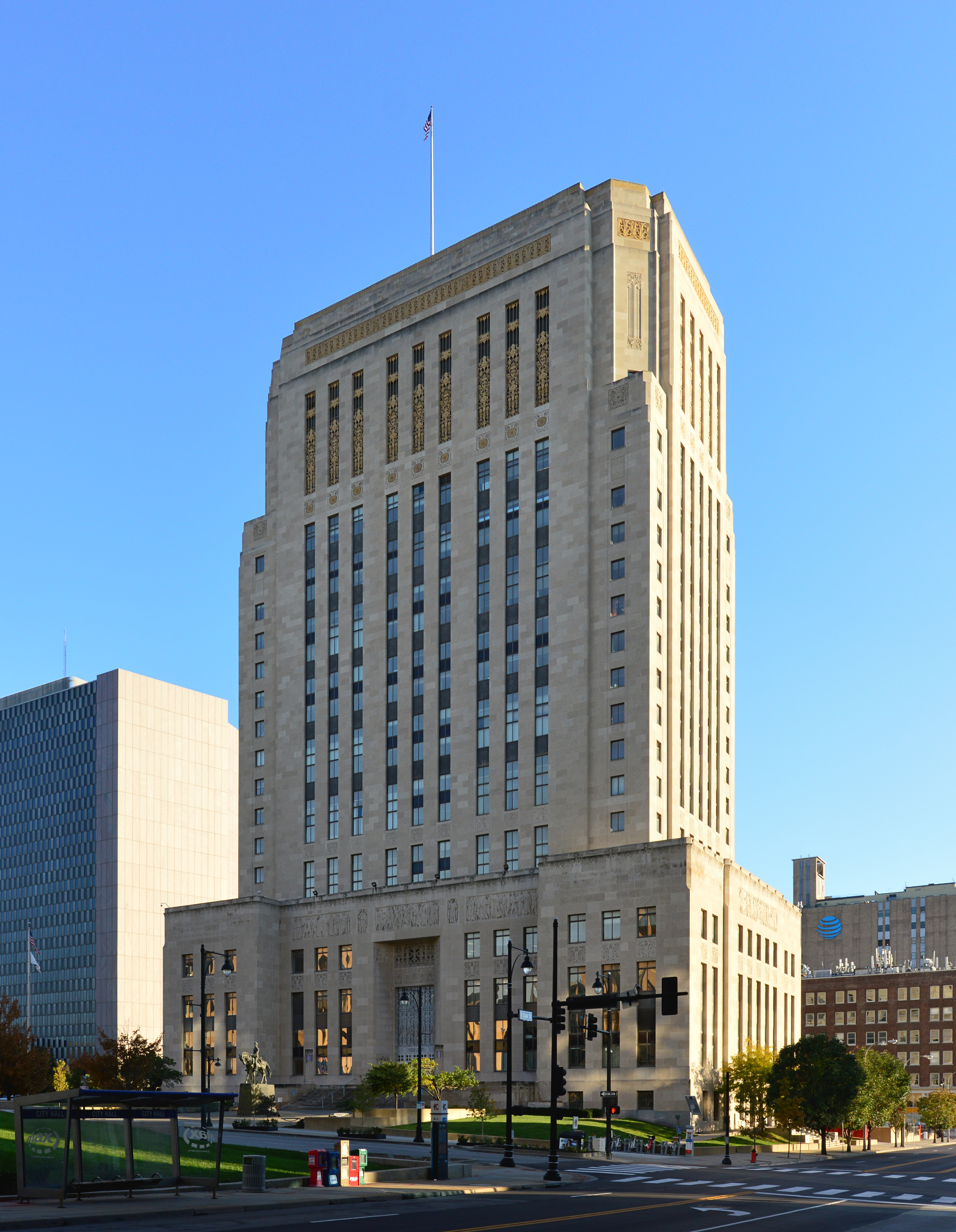
Jackson County courthouse for the 16th Circuit Court in Kansas City

The Missouri Circuit Courts are the state trial courts of original jurisdiction and general jurisdiction of the state of Missouri.

== Jurisdiction ==
The Missouri Constitution provides for the Circuit Courts in Article V, Judicial Department.

Section 14: Circuit courts – jurisdiction – sessions.
(a) The circuit courts shall have original jurisdiction over all cases and matters, civil and criminal. Such courts may issue and determine original remedial writs and shall sit at times and places within the circuit as determined by the circuit court.
(b) Procedures for the adjudication of small claims shall be as provided by law.
Section 15: Judicial circuits – establishment and changes – general terms and divisions – judges—presiding judge – court personnel.
1. The state shall be divided into convenient circuits of contiguous counties. In each circuit there shall be at least one circuit judge. The circuits may be changed or abolished by law as public convenience and the administration of justice may require, but no judge shall be removed from office during his term by reason of alteration of the geographical boundaries of a circuit. Any circuit or associate circuit judge may temporarily sit in any other circuit at the request of a judge thereof. In circuits having more than one judge, the court may sit in general term or in divisions. The circuit judges of the circuit may make rules for the circuit not inconsistent with the rules of the supreme court.
2. Each circuit shall have such number of circuit judges as provided by law.
3. The circuit and associate circuit judges in each circuit shall select by secret ballot a circuit judge from their number to serve as presiding judge. The presiding judge shall have general administrative authority over the court and its divisions.
4. Personnel to aid in the business of the circuit court shall be selected as provided by law or in accordance with a governmental charter of a political subdivision of this state. Where there is a separate probate division of the circuit court, the judge of the probate division shall, until otherwise provided by law, appoint a clerk and other nonjudicial personnel for the probate division.

== List of circuits ==
There are 46 judicial circuits, each with various divisions, including associate circuit, small claims, municipal, family, probate, criminal, and juvenile. Each circuit covers at least one of Missouri's 114 counties and one independent city, St. Louis.

- 1st Judicial Circuit – Clark County, Schuyler County, Scotland County
- 2nd Judicial Circuit – Adair County, Knox County, Lewis County
- 3rd Judicial Circuit – Grundy County, Harrison County, Mercer County, Putnam County
- 4th Judicial Circuit – Atchison County, Gentry County, Holt County, Nodaway County, Worth County
- 5th Judicial Circuit – Andrew County, Buchanan County
- 6th Judicial Circuit – Platte County
- 7th Judicial Circuit – Clay County
- 8th Judicial Circuit – Carroll County, Ray County
- 9th Judicial Circuit – Chariton County, Linn County, Sullivan County
- 10th Judicial Circuit – Marion County, Monroe County, Ralls County
- 11th Judicial Circuit – St. Charles County
- 12th Judicial Circuit – Audrain County, Montgomery County, Warren County
- 13th Judicial Circuit – Boone County, Callaway County
- 14th Judicial Circuit – Howard County, Randolph County
- 15th Judicial Circuit – Lafayette County, Saline County
- 16th Judicial Circuit – Jackson County
- 17th Judicial Circuit – Cass County, Johnson County
- 18th Judicial Circuit – Cooper County, Pettis County
- 19th Judicial Circuit – Cole County
- 20th Judicial Circuit – Franklin County, Gasconade County, Osage County
- 21st Judicial Circuit – St. Louis County
- 22nd Judicial Circuit – City of St. Louis
- 23rd Judicial Circuit – Jefferson County
- 24th Judicial Circuit – Madison County, Sainte Genevieve County, Saint Francois County, Washington County
- 25th Judicial Circuit – Maries County, Phelps County, Pulaski County, Texas County
- 26th Judicial Circuit – Camden County, Laclede County, Miller County, Moniteau County, Morgan County
- 27th Judicial Circuit – Bates County, Benton County, Henry County, St. Clair County
- 28th Judicial Circuit – Barton County, Cedar County, Dade County, Vernon County
- 29th Judicial Circuit – Jasper County
- 30th Judicial Circuit – Dallas County, Hickory County, Polk County, Webster County
- 31st Judicial Circuit – Greene County
- 32nd Judicial Circuit – Bollinger County, Cape Girardeau County, Perry County
- 33rd Judicial Circuit – Mississippi County, Scott County
- 34th Judicial Circuit – New Madrid County, Pemiscot County
- 35th Judicial Circuit – Dunklin County, Stoddard County
- 36th Judicial Circuit – Butler County, Ripley County
- 37th Judicial Circuit – Carter County, Howell County, Oregon County, Shannon County
- 38th Judicial Circuit – Christian County
- 39th Judicial Circuit – Barry County, Lawrence County, Stone County
- 40th Judicial Circuit – McDonald County, Newton County
- 41st Judicial Circuit – Macon County, Shelby County
- 42nd Judicial Circuit – Crawford County, Dent County, Iron County, Reynolds County, Wayne County
- 43rd Judicial Circuit – Caldwell County, Clinton County, Daviess County, DeKalb County, Livingston County
- 44th Judicial Circuit – Douglas County, Ozark County, Wright County
- 45th Judicial Circuit – Lincoln County, Pike County
- 46th Judicial Circuit – Taney County
