= Limbaugh =

Limbaugh is a surname. Notable people with the surname include:

- David Limbaugh (born 1952), American political commentator and author
- Rush Limbaugh III (1951–2021), American political commentator
- Rush Limbaugh Sr. (1891–1996), American politician
- Stephen N. Limbaugh Jr. (born 1952), United States district judge
- Stephen N. Limbaugh Sr. (born 1927), former United States district judge
