= Stephen Limbaugh =

Stephen N. Limbaugh may refer to:

- Stephen N. Limbaugh Jr. (born 1952), former Missouri Supreme Court Justice and current U.S. District Court Judge (2008–)
- Stephen N. Limbaugh Sr. (born 1927), former U.S. District Court Judge (1983–2008)
