= List of first women lawyers and judges in Missouri =

This is a list of the first women lawyer(s) and judge(s) in Missouri. It includes the year in which the women were admitted to practice law (in parentheses). Also included are women who achieved other distinctions such becoming the first in their state to graduate from law school or become a political figure.

== Firsts in Missouri's history ==
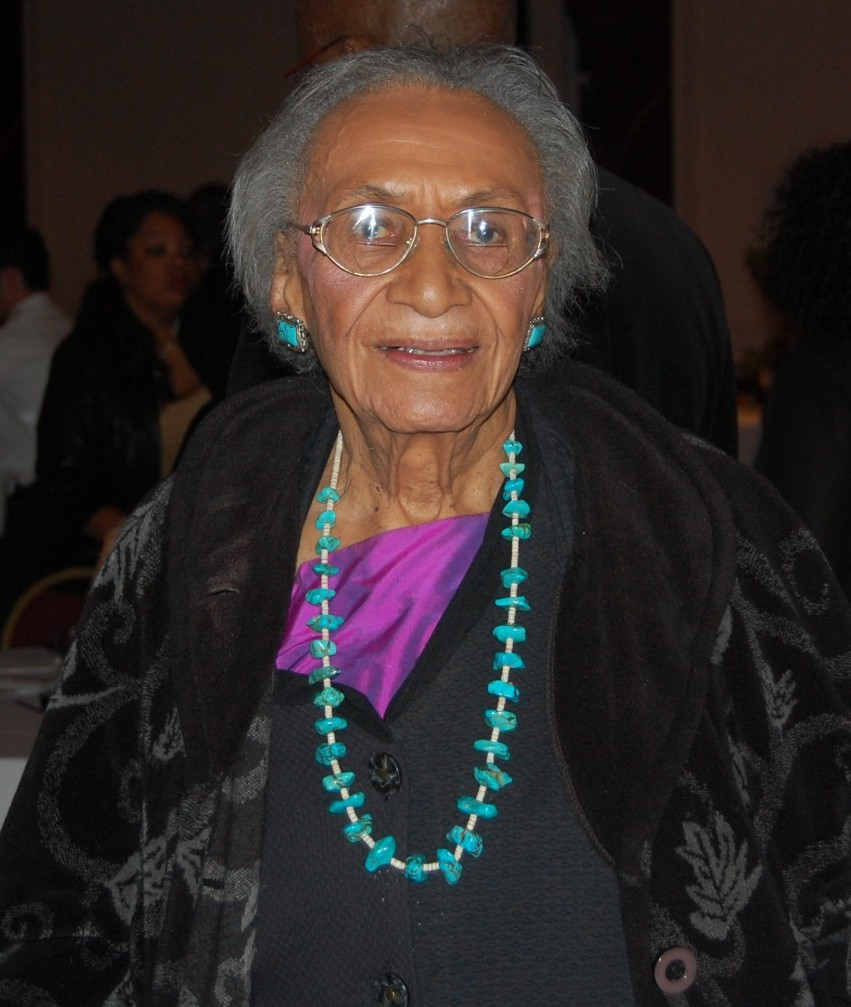
Frankie Muse Freeman: First female (and African American female) to serve on the U.S. Commission on Civil Rights (1964)

=== Law School ===
- First female law graduate: Phoebe Couzins in 1871

=== Lawyers ===
- First female: Lemma Barkeloo (1870)
- First female (practice law in the first congressional district of Maryland): Lois Buhl (1904)
- First African American female: Dorothy L. Freeman (1942)
- First (African American) female (U.S. Commission on Civil Rights): Frankie Muse Freeman (1937) in 1964
- First African American female to practice before the Supreme Court of the United States: Leona P. Thurman (1949)

=== State judges ===
- First female (non-attorney judge): Frances Hopkins in 1915
- First female elected: Margaret Young (1931) in 1954
- First female appointed: Marybelle Mueller (1950) in 1955
- First female (under the Missouri Nonpartisan Court Plan): Anna Forder (1974) in 1979
- First female elected (circuit court): Ellen Roper (1973) in 1982
- First African American female: Evelyn Marie Baker in 1983
- First female (Supreme Court of Missouri): Ann K. Covington (1977) in 1988
- First Hispanic American female (circuit court): Justine Del Muro in 1993
- First female (Supreme Court of Missouri; Chief Justice): Ann K. Covington (1977) from 1993-1995
- First African American (female elected): Mary Ellen Young in 1994
- First African American female (Missouri Court of Appeals): Lisa White Hardwick (1985) in 2001
- First Asian American (female): Judy Preddy Draper in 2004
- First African American female (Chief Judge; Missouri Court of Appeals): Nannette Baker in 2008
- First African-American female (Presiding Judge; Twenty-Second Judicial Circuit): Robin Ransom in 2018
- First African-American female (Supreme Court of Missouri): Robin Ransom in 2021

=== Federal judges ===
- First African American female (U.S. District Court for the Eastern District of Missouri; Chief Justice): Carol E. Jackson (1976) in 1992 and 2002 respectively

=== Attorney General ===
- First female: Catherine Hanaway in 2025

=== Assistant Attorney General ===
- First female: Margaret Young (1931) in 1939

=== Public Defender ===
- First female: Terry Daley Schwartze in 1980

=== County Prosecutor ===
- First female: Mayce Jones Maness (1929) in 1942

=== Missouri Bar Association ===
- First female president: Doreen Dodson
- First African American female president: Dana Tippin Cutler

== Firsts in local history ==
- Hilda Neihardt (1963): First female lawyer to practice law in central Missouri
- Mary Tiera Farrow (c. 1924): First female lawyer in Kansas City, Missouri [Jackson County, Clay County, Platte County, and Cass County]
- Leona P. Thurman (1949): First African American female lawyer in Kansas City, Missouri [Jackson County, Clay County, Platte County, and Cass County]
- Carol Coe: First African American (female) to serve as the Kansas City Assistant City Attorney [Jackson County, Clay County, Platte County, and Cass County]
- Rosemary Straub Davison: First female lawyer in Monroe County, Missouri and Ralls County, Missouri
- Gloria Clark Reno: First African American female to serve as the Presiding Judge for the 21st Judicial Circuit (2018).
- Kayla Jackson-Williams: First African American (female) elected as a judge in Boone County, Missouri (2022)
- Margaret Young (1931): First female elected as a Buchanan County Magistrate Judge (1954)
- Delia C. Holt: First female lawyer in Cape Girardeau County, Missouri
- Dana Altieri: First female judge in Lee's Summit (2010) [Cass and Jackson Counties, Missouri]
- Jane Pansing Brown: First female judge in Clay County, Missouri
- Lisa Henderson: First female judge in Dallas County, Missouri (2010)
- Virginia Booth Anding: Reputed to be the first female lawyer in Franklin County, Missouri
- Alma Smith Dodson: First woman admitted to the Bar of Greene County, Missouri
- Edith Messina (1974): First female judge in Jackson County, Missouri (1984)
- Christine Hutson: First female to serve as an Associate Circuit Judge for Laclede County, Missouri
- Hazel Palmer: First female lawyer in Pettis County, Missouri. She would later become a judge.
- Mayce Jones Maness (1929): First female to serve as a County Prosecutor in Ripley County, Missouri (1942)
- Phoebe Couzins: First female law graduate from the University of Washington School of Law in St. Louis, Missouri (1871)
- Dorothy L. Freeman (1942): First African American female lawyer in St. Louis, Missouri
- Mabel Wood Hinckley: First female judge in St. Louis, Missouri
- Esther M. Golly (1931): First female admitted to the Bar of the Circuit Court of St. Louis County. She was also the first female President of the St. Louis County Bar Association.
- Gerre Strehlman Langton: First female to serve as the Assistant Prosecuting Attorney for St. Louis County, Missouri (1960)
- Susan Block (1975): First female elected judge in St. Louis, St. Louis County, Missouri
- Sandra Hemphill (1992): First African American female judge
- Christina Kime: First female judge in Wayne County, Missouri (2018)

== See also ==
- List of first women lawyers and judges in the United States
- Timeline of women lawyers in the United States
- Women in law

== Other topics of interest ==
- List of first minority male lawyers and judges in the United States
- List of first minority male lawyers and judges in Missouri
