= Randolph Henry Weber =

American judge

Judge of the United States District Court for the Eastern District of Missouri
- In office March 14, 1957 – November 23, 1961
- Appointed by: Dwight D. Eisenhower
- Preceded by: Rubey Mosley Hulen
- Succeeded by: John Keating Regan

Personal details
- Born: Randolph Henry Weber; November 26, 1909 St. Louis, Missouri, U.S.
- Died: November 23, 1961 (aged 51)
- Education: Washington University in St. Louis (LL.B.)

Randolph Henry Weber (November 26, 1909 – November 23, 1961) was a United States district judge of the United States District Court for the Eastern District of Missouri.

== Education and career ==
Born in St. Louis, Missouri, Weber received a Bachelor of Laws from Washington University School of Law in 1933. He was in private practice in Poplar Bluff, Missouri from 1933 to 1957. He was city attorney of Poplar Bluff from 1935 to 1937. He was prosecuting attorney of Butler County, Missouri from 1937 to 1938. He was a member of the Missouri House of Representatives from 1939 to 1940. He was a Circuit Judge for the 33rd Judicial Circuit of Missouri from 1943 to 1957.

== Federal judicial service ==
Weber was nominated by President Dwight D. Eisenhower on February 4, 1957, to a seat on the United States District Court for the Eastern District of Missouri vacated by Judge Rubey Mosley Hulen. He was confirmed by the United States Senate on March 14, 1957, and received his commission the same day. Weber served in that capacity until his death on November 23, 1961.

== Sources ==
Legal offices
Preceded by Rubey Mosley Hulen	Judge of the United States District Court for the Eastern District of Missouri; 1957–1961	Succeeded by John Keating Regan
