= Audrey G. Fleissig =

American judge (born 1955)

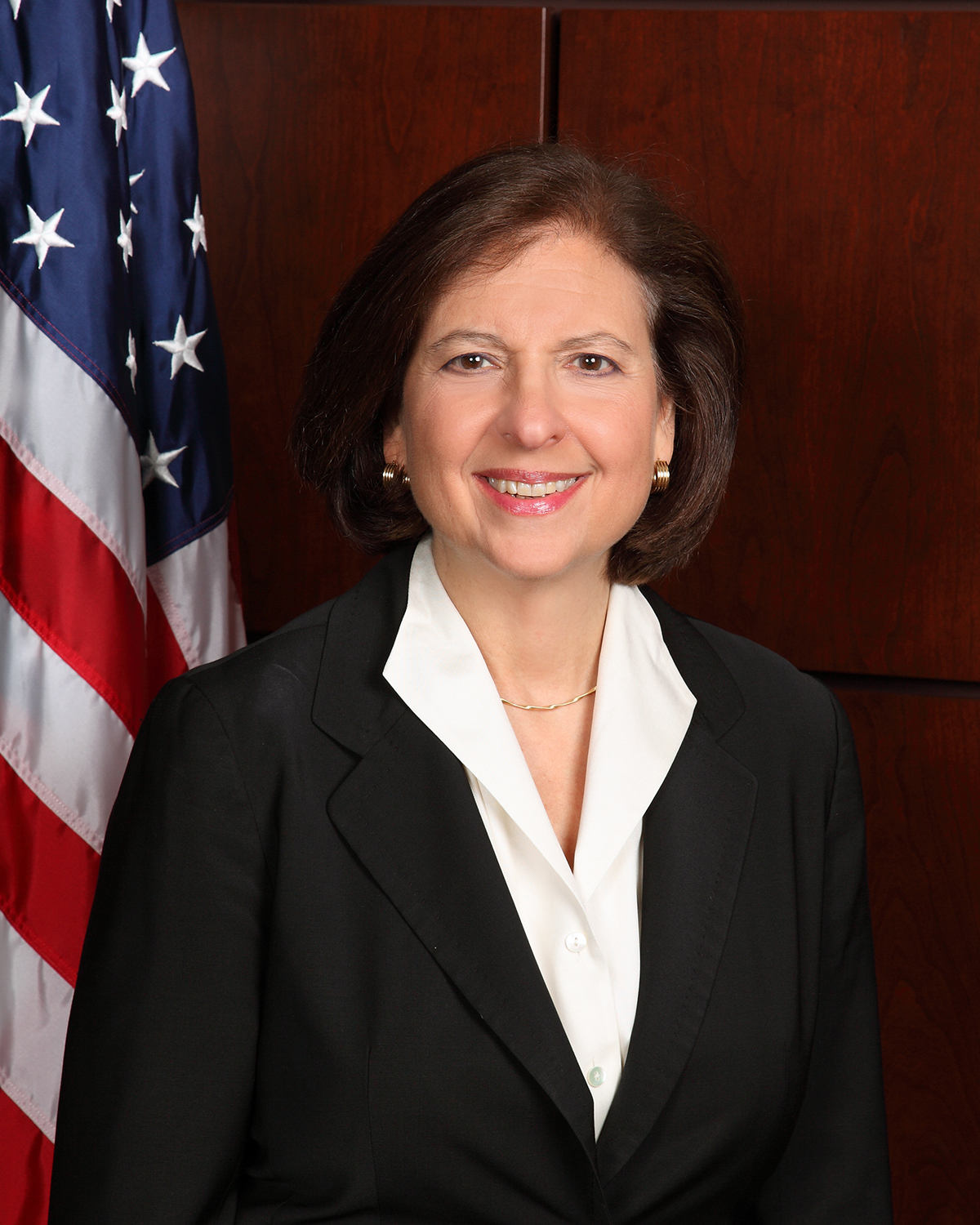

Senior Judge of the United States District Court for the Eastern District of Missouri
- Incumbent
- Assumed office April 14, 2023

Judge of the United States District Court for the Eastern District of Missouri
- In office June 9, 2010 – April 14, 2023
- Appointed by: Barack Obama
- Preceded by: E. Richard Webber
- Succeeded by: Cristian Stevens

Magistrate Judge of the United States District Court for the Eastern District of Missouri
- In office 2001–2010

43rd United States Attorney for the Eastern District of Missouri
- In office 2000–2001
- Appointed by: Bill Clinton
- Preceded by: Edward Dowd
- Succeeded by: Raymond Gruender

Personal details
- Born: Audrey Ellen Goldstein; 1955 (age 70–71) St. Louis, Missouri, U.S.
- Education: Carleton College (BA); Washington University in St. Louis (JD)

Audrey Goldstein Fleissig (née Audrey Ellen Goldstein; born 1955) is a senior United States district judge of the United States District Court for the Eastern District of Missouri. She also is a former United States attorney.

== Early life and education ==
Born in St. Louis, Missouri, Fleissig earned a Bachelor of Arts degree in 1976 from Carleton College and a Juris Doctor in 1980 from Washington University School of Law. During her third year of law school, she worked as a law clerk for Judge Edward Louis Filippine, a judge on the United States District Court for the Eastern District of Missouri.

== Career ==
From 1980 until 1991, Fleissig worked for a St. Louis law firm, first as an associate (from 1980 until 1989), and then as a partner (from 1989 until 1991). In 1991, Fleissig became an assistant United States attorney in St. Louis, a post she held until being named United States Attorney in 2000. She served as United States Attorney from 2000 until 2001, when she again became an Assistant United States Attorney. Later in 2001, Fleissig became a United States magistrate judge, a position she held until becoming a United States District Judge in 2010.

=== Federal judicial service ===
In February 2009, Fleissig submitted her resume for a federal district court vacancy in St. Louis to United States Senator Claire McCaskill. In August 2009, McCaskill personally interviewed Fleissig. After interviews with representatives of the United States Department of Justice and the White House, Fleissig was nominated on January 20, 2010 to the position by President Obama, to replace Judge E. Richard Webber, who assumed senior status on June 30, 2009. On March 4, 2010, the United States Senate Committee on the Judiciary sent Fleissig's nomination to the full Senate. The Senate confirmed Fleissig on June 7, 2010 by a 90–0 vote. She received her commission on June 9, 2010. As of Oct. 1, 2018, she is Chair of the Committee on Court Administration and Case Management (CACM) of the Judicial Conference of the United States, and has continued in that role through at least June 2019. Fleissig assumed senior status on April 14, 2023, her 68th birthday.

Legal offices
Preceded by E. Richard Webber	Judge of the United States District Court for the Eastern District of Missouri; 2010–2023	Succeeded by Cristian Stevens
