= Brown v. ATF =

Pending US District Court case

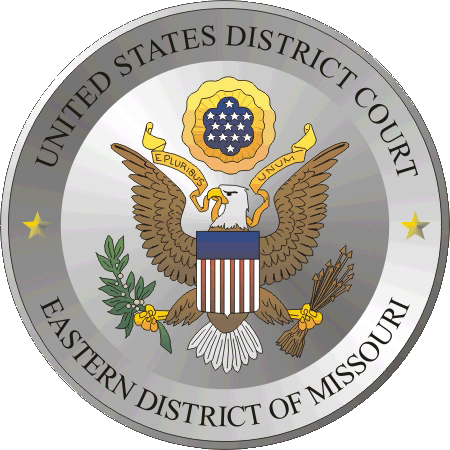
- Court: United States District Court for the Eastern District of Missouri
- Full case name: Chris Brown, et al. v. Bureau of Alcohol, Tobacco, Firearms and Explosives, et al.
- Citation: 4:25-cv-1162 (E.D. Mo.)

Court membership
- Judge sitting: Stephen R. Clark

Brown v. ATF (Docket No. 4:25-cv-1162) is a pending case in the United States District Court for the Eastern District of Missouri challenging the constitutionality of various provisions of the National Firearms Act.

== Background ==
In 1934, Congress enacted the National Firearms Act (NFA). The NFA was passed amid fears of organized crime during the Prohibition era, culminating in events such as the St. Valentine's Day Massacre in 1929 and the assassination attempt of President-elect Franklin D. Roosevelt in 1933. The Act created a registration and taxation scheme for several types of firearms and firearms accessories (machine guns, short-barreled rifles, short-barreled shotguns, suppressors, destructive devices, and "Any Other Weapon" ). The NFA requires such items to be taxed and registered with the Bureau of Alcohol, Tobacco, Firearms and Explosives (ATF). As enacted, the Act set the tax amount at $200 (equivalent to $4,813 in 2025). Possession or transfer of an unregistered NFA item is prohibited, and is punishable by up to ten years in prison. Unlike most other federal criminal laws, the National Firearms Act is not located in Title 18 of the United States Code, but instead in the Internal Revenue Code.

On July 3, 2025, Congress passed the One Big Beautiful Bill Act (OBBBA). The law was signed by President Trump the following day. Effective January 1, 2026, the OBBBA reduced the NFA tax on the production and transfer of suppressors, short-barreled rifles, short-barreled shotguns, AOWs from $200 to $0, while leaving the registration requirements intact.

== Proceedings ==
Plaintiffs are two individuals, a firearms retailer, National Rifle Association, the Firearms Policy Coalition, Second Amendment Foundation, and the American Suppressor Association. Defendants are the ATF, its director, the United States Department of Justice, and the Attorney General of the United States. On August 1, 2025, plaintiffs brought suit against defendants in the United States District Court for the Eastern District of Missouri, alleging that the NFA (as recently amended by the OBBBA) exceeds Congress's enumerated powers as applied to the untaxed items, and violates the Second Amendment as applied to suppressors and short-barreled rifles. On August 5, the case was assigned to Chief District Judge Stephen R. Clark.

On September 30, the district court set a briefing schedule, wherein plaintiffs' and defendants' motions for summary judgment (along with briefs in opposition and reply briefs) would submitted by February 20, 2026. On March 24, the court ordered supplemental briefing on additional legal issues by plaintiffs, defendants, and their amici.

== Notes ==
1. "Any other weapon" ("AOW") is a catch-all term defined to include, among other things, "any weapon or device capable of being concealed on the person from which a shot can be discharged through the energy of an explosive." 26 U.S.C. § 5845.
