= Rubey Mosley Hulen =

American judge (1894–1956)

Judge of the United States District Court for the Eastern District of Missouri
- In office July 14, 1943 – July 7, 1956
- Appointed by: Franklin D. Roosevelt
- Preceded by: Charles B. Davis
- Succeeded by: Randolph Henry Weber

Personal details
- Born: Rubey Mosley Hulen; July 9, 1894; Hallsville, Missouri, U.S.
- Died: July 7, 1956 (aged 61)
- Education: Kansas City School of Law

Rubey Mosley Hulen (July 9, 1894 – July 7, 1956) was a United States district judge of the United States District Court for the Eastern District of Missouri. In July 1950, Hulen issued an injunction requiring the City of St. Louis, Missouri to open its fairgrounds and Marquette swimming pools to swimmers of all races.

== Education and career ==
Born in Hallsville, Missouri, Hulen graduated from Kansas City School of Law (now the University of Missouri–Kansas City School of Law) in 1914. He was in private practice in Centralia, Missouri from 1915 to 1917. He was in the United States Army as Lieutenant Commander (Note: This may be a transcription error by FJC Bio, as the Army does not and never has had that rank.) from 1917 to 1918. He was prosecuting attorney of Boone County, Missouri from 1920 to 1924. He was in private practice in St. Louis, Missouri from 1919 to 1943.

== Federal judicial service ==
Hulen was nominated by President Franklin D. Roosevelt on July 8, 1943, to a seat on the United States District Court for the Eastern District of Missouri vacated by Judge Charles B. Davis. He was confirmed by the United States Senate on July 8, 1943, and received his commission on July 14, 1943. Hulen served in that capacity until his death on July 7, 1956.

=== Other service ===
Concurrent with his judicial service, Hulen was a lecturer at the School of Law at Washington University.

=== St. Louis segregation case ===
On June 19, 1950, three African Americans attempted to enter the Fairgrounds Park Pool in St. Louis, Missouri, in contravention of the city's segregation policy, which had been re-instituted following one day of integration in 1949, which culminated in Fairground Park riot. A pool attendant told the three African Americans attempting access that they needed permits to enter the pool. The St. Louis chapter of the NAACP sued in United States District Court, seeking a court order requiring desegregation of the city's swimming pools.

In the St. Louis case, in the course of an exchange with the city's attorney (who happened to be named James Crowe), Hulen asked rhetorically: "Does the viewpoint of the community set aside the Constitution? Is the Constitution to be shelved for an hour, or set aside, because one part of the community happens to have an antipathy towards it?"

In his ruling, Hulen "suggested that racial exclusion from any municipal pool, even if another truly equal pool were provided, might still violate the Constitution." Hulen observed that a comparable pool "may mitigate discrimination but would not validate it as to other sections of the city."

Author Jeff Wiltse remarks that "Hulen seemed to be saying that a black swimmer who had to walk past a whites-only pool to get to a truly equal Jim Crow pool would not be receiving equal treatment under the law, as mandated by the Fourteenth Amendment."

This is the essence of the Brown v. Board of Education ruling, that a black student should not have to travel to a more distant segregated school. In that case, the plaintiff's daughter, Linda, a third grader, had to walk six blocks to her school bus stop to ride to Monroe Elementary, her segregated black school one mile away, while Sumner Elementary School, a white school, was only seven blocks from her house.

== Scholarships ==
Rubey M. Hulen Memorial Honor Scholarships are awarded each year to outstanding entering University of Missouri–Kansas City law students from a fund provided by the will of Anna Hulen, widow of Rubey M. Hulen, a distinguished alumnus of the University of Missouri - Kansas City.

== Sources ==
Legal offices
Preceded by Charles B. Davis	Judge of the United States District Court for the Eastern District of Missouri; 1943–1956	Succeeded by Randolph Henry Weber
