= Harris Kenneth Wangelin =

American judge

Senior Judge of the United States District Court for the Eastern District of Missouri Senior Judge of the United States District Court for the Western District of Missouri
- In office May 10, 1983 – June 10, 1987

Chief Judge of the United States District Court for the Eastern District of Missouri
- In office 1979–1983
- Preceded by: James Hargrove Meredith
- Succeeded by: John Francis Nangle

Judge of the United States District Court for the Eastern District of Missouri Judge of the United States District Court for the Western District of Missouri
- In office December 22, 1970 – May 10, 1983
- Appointed by: Richard Nixon
- Preceded by: Roy Winfield Harper
- Succeeded by: Stephen N. Limbaugh Sr.

Personal details
- Born: Harris Kenneth Wangelin; May 10, 1913 Des Moines, Iowa, U.S.
- Died: June 10, 1987 (aged 74) Poplar Bluff, Missouri, U.S.
- Education: Iberia Academy and Junior College (A.A.); University of Missouri School of Law (J.D.)

Harris Kenneth Wangelin (May 10, 1913 – June 10, 1987) was a United States district judge of the United States District Court for the Eastern District of Missouri and of the United States District Court for the Western District of Missouri.

== Education and career ==
Born in Des Moines, Iowa, Wangelin received an Associate of Arts degree from Iberia Academy and Junior College in 1932 and a Juris Doctor from the University of Missouri School of Law in 1936. He was in private practice in Van Buren, Missouri, from 1936 to 1937. He was an adjuster for the Maryland Casualty Company in Missouri from 1937 to 1942. He was a Lieutenant (SG) in the United States Navy during World War II, from 1942 to 1945. He then returned to private practice in Poplar Bluff, Missouri, until 1970.

== Federal judicial service ==
On December 8, 1970, Wangelin was nominated by President Richard Nixon to a joint seat on the United States District Court for the Eastern District of Missouri and the United States District Court for the Western District of Missouri vacated by Juge Roy Winfield Harper. Wangelin was confirmed by the United States Senate on December 17, 1970, and received his commission on December 22, 1970. He served as Chief Judge of the Eastern District from 1979 to 1983. He assumed senior status on May 10, 1983, serving in that capacity until his death on June 10, 1987, in Poplar Bluff.

== Sources ==
Legal offices
Preceded by Roy Winfield Harper	Judge of the United States District Court for the Eastern District of Missouri; Judge of the United States District Court for the Western District of Missouri; 1970–1983	Succeeded by Stephen N. Limbaugh Sr.
Preceded by James Hargrove Meredith	Chief Judge of the United States District Court for the Eastern District of Missouri; 1979–1983	Succeeded by John Francis Nangle
