= Carol E. Jackson =

American judge (born 1952)

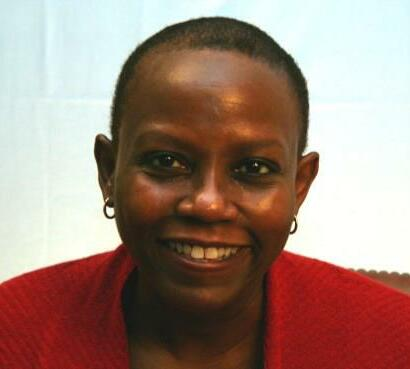

Chief Judge of the United States District Court for the Eastern District of Missouri
- In office 2002–2009
- Preceded by: Jean Constance Hamilton
- Succeeded by: Catherine D. Perry

Judge of the United States District Court for the Eastern District of Missouri
- In office August 17, 1992 – August 31, 2017
- Appointed by: George H. W. Bush
- Preceded by: William L. Hungate
- Succeeded by: Stephen R. Clark

Magistrate Judge of the United States District Court for the Eastern District of Missouri
- In office 1986–1992

Personal details
- Born: Carol Elaine Jackson; August 9, 1952 (age 73) St. Louis, Missouri, U.S.
- Education: Wellesley College (BA); University of Michigan Law School (JD)

Carol Elaine Jackson (born August 9, 1952) is a former United States district judge of the United States District Court for the Eastern District of Missouri. She was nominated by President George H. W. Bush and served from 1992 to her retirement in 2017.

In addition to years in private practice, Jackson served as a federal magistrate judge before being confirmed as a US district judge. She also served as Chief Judge for several years; in each of those positions, she was the first African-American woman to serve in the position in the Eastern District of Missouri.

Born and raised in Saint Louis, Missouri, she earned a BA degree from Wellesley College and a Juris Doctor degree from University of Michigan.

== Education ==
Born and raised in St. Louis, Missouri, Jackson received a Bachelor of Arts degree from Wellesley College in 1973. She followed that with a Juris Doctor from the University of Michigan Law School in 1976.

== Career ==
After passing the bar in Missouri, Jackson was in private practice in St. Louis from 1976 to 1983. She served as a senior attorney of Mallinckrodt from 1983 to 1985.

While serving as a federal magistrate judge, she was also an adjunct professor at the School of Law at Washington University in St. Louis from 1989 to 1992.

== Federal judicial service ==
Jackson was appointed as a United States magistrate judge of the United States District Court for the Eastern District of Missouri, serving from 1986 to 1992. She was the first African-American magistrate judge in the Eastern District of Missouri.

On April 1, 1992, Jackson was nominated by President George H. W. Bush to a seat on the United States District Court for the Eastern District of Missouri, which had been vacated by Judge William L. Hungate. She was confirmed by the United States Senate on August 12, 1992, and received her commission on August 17, 1992.

Jackson was the first African-American woman to serve as a district court judge in the Eastern District of Missouri. She served as Chief Judge from 2002 through 2009, and was the first African-American chief judge. She retired from active service on August 31, 2017.

== See also ==
- List of African-American federal judges
- List of African-American jurists
- List of first women lawyers and judges in Missouri

== Sources ==
Legal offices
Preceded by William L. Hungate	Judge of the United States District Court for the Eastern District of Missouri; 1992–2017	Succeeded by Stephen R. Clark
Preceded by Jean Constance Hamilton	Chief Judge of the United States District Court for the Eastern District of Missouri; 2002–2009	Succeeded by Catherine D. Perry
