= Dorothy L. Freeman =

American lawyer

Dorothy L. Freeman was Missouri’s first African American female lawyer.

Freeman was born in St. Louis, Missouri. She attended Sumner High School and Stowe Teachers College before earning a scholarship to Lincoln University School of Law. She entered the institution in 1939 and worked as a student assistant for the library. In 1942, Freeman became the first African American woman to graduate from Lincoln University School of Law and to be admitted to practice law in Missouri. While studying at Lincoln, she worked as a student assistant in the library and as a secretary for Silas Garner, a Black attorney and law school staff member. Due to an instructor shortage, Freeman was approached to serve as an educator at the law school. However, the school closed briefly in 1943, and Freeman instead became the first African American woman lawyer in St. Louis, Missouri.

== See also ==
- List of first women lawyers and judges in Missouri
