= Donald J. Stohr =

American judge (1934–2015)

Donald Julius Stohr
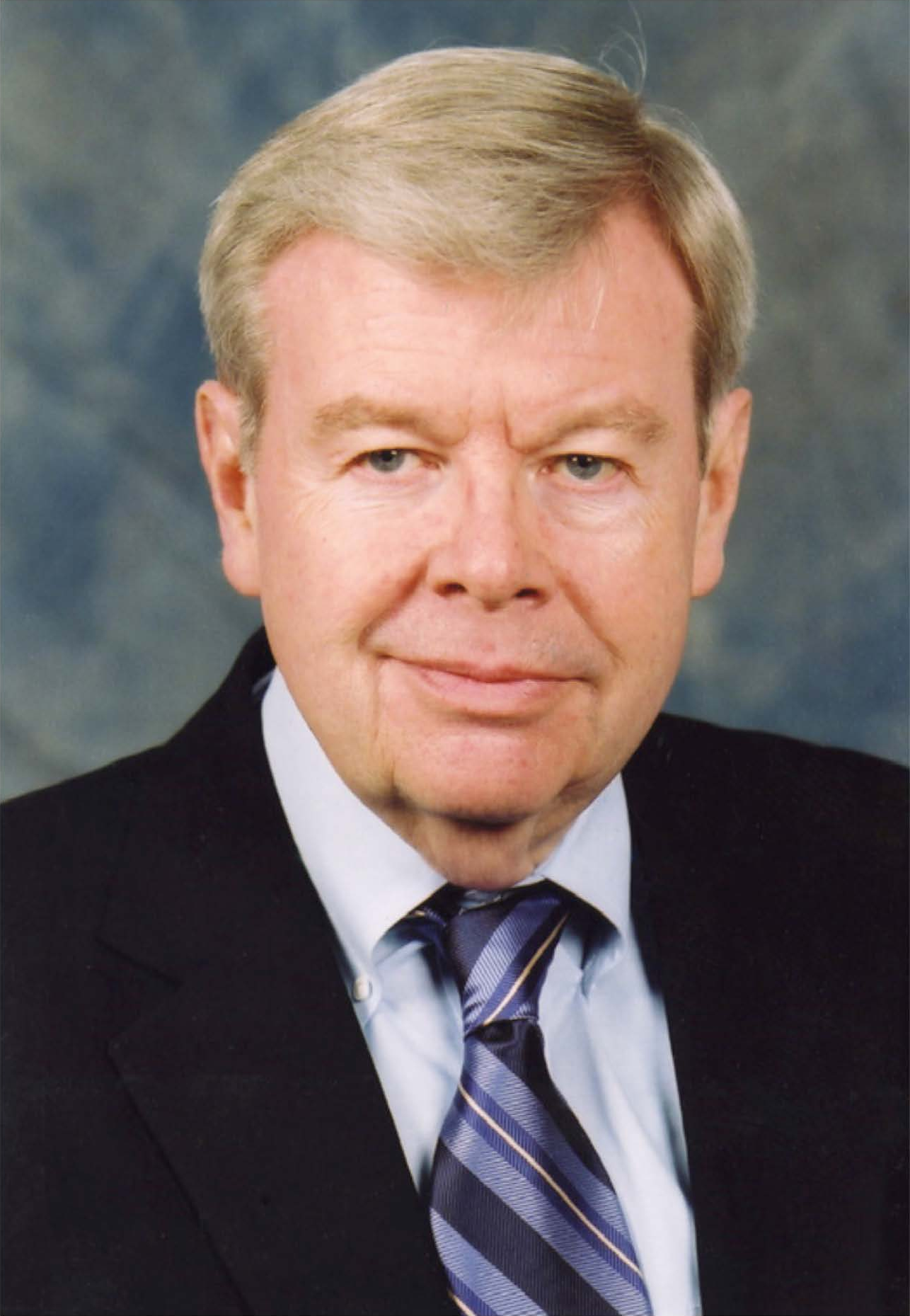

Senior Judge of the United States District Court for the Eastern District of Missouri
- In office December 31, 2006 – December 10, 2015

Judge of the United States District Court for the Eastern District of Missouri
- In office April 13, 1992 – December 31, 2006
- Appointed by: George H. W. Bush
- Preceded by: Seat established by 104 Stat. 5089
- Succeeded by: Stephen N. Limbaugh Jr.

Personal details
- Born: Donald Julius Stohr; March 9, 1934 Sedalia, Missouri, U.S.
- Died: December 10, 2015 (aged 81) Ladue, Missouri, U.S.
- Education: Saint Louis University (BS); Saint Louis University School of Law (JD)

Donald Julius Stohr (March 9, 1934 – December 10, 2015) was an American attorney and Article III federal judge who served on the United States District Court for the Eastern District of Missouri from 1992 through 2015.

== Education and Early Career ==
Stohr was born in Sedalia, Missouri and received a Bachelor of Science degree from Saint Louis University in 1956 and a Juris Doctor from Saint Louis University School of Law in 1958. He was in private practice in St. Louis, Missouri from 1958 to 1962. In 1960 Stohr ran against Thomas F. Eagleton for Attorney General of Missouri. During the campaign, Stohr and Eagleton became friends and would drive to the debates together. Stohr and Eagleton would later become partners at Thompson & Mitchell, now known as Thompson Coburn LLP.

Stohr left private practice in 1963 to become an Assistant County Counselor for St. Louis County. In 1965 he became the lead St. Louis County Counselor until he returned to private practice in 1966. He remained in private practice until 1973 when he was named the United States Attorney for the United States District Court for the Eastern District of Missouri. He returned to private practice in 1976 where he remained until his nomination to be a federal judge.

== Federal Judicial Service ==
On the recommendation of John Danforth, Stohr was nominated by President George H. W. Bush on November 14, 1991, to the United States District Court for the Eastern District of Missouri, to a new seat created by 104 Stat. 5089. He was confirmed by the United States Senate on April 8, 1992, and received his commission on April 13, 1992. He assumed senior status on December 31, 2006, and remained on the bench until his death on December 10, 2015.

Party political offices
Preceded by Vincent E. Baker	Republican nominee for Missouri Attorney General; 1960	Succeeded by Daniel Bartlett, Jr.
Legal offices
Preceded by James E. Reeves	United States Attorney for the Eastern District of Missouri; 1973–1976	Succeeded by Barry A. Short
Preceded by Seat established by 104 Stat. 5089	Judge of the United States District Court for the Eastern District of Missouri; 1992–2006	Succeeded by Stephen N. Limbaugh, Jr.
