= Cristian Stevens =

American judge (born 1973)

Cristian Matthew Stevens
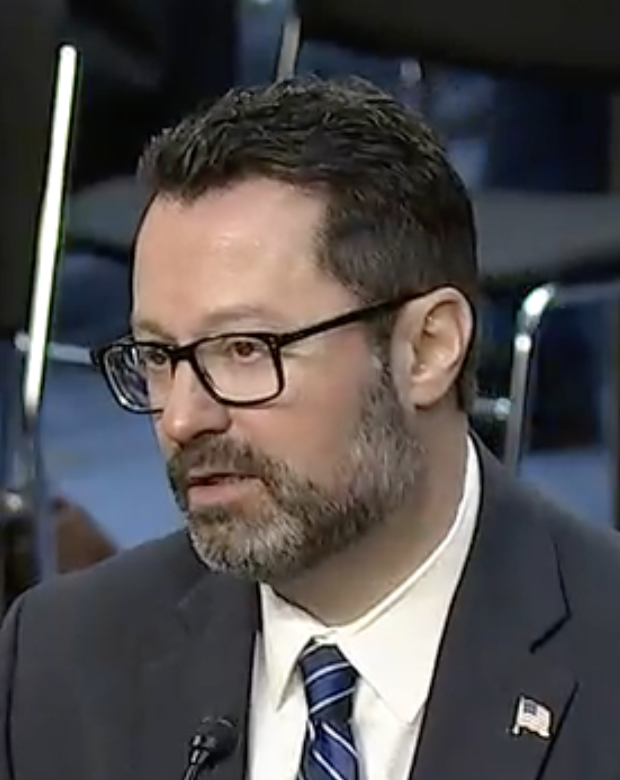

Judge of the United States District Court for the Eastern District of Missouri
- Incumbent
- Assumed office July 23, 2025
- Appointed by: Donald Trump
- Preceded by: Audrey G. Fleissig

Personal details
- Born: 1973 (age 52–53) St. Louis, Missouri, U.S.
- Education: University of Missouri (BA, JD)

Cristian Matthew Stevens (born 1973) is an American lawyer who serves as a United States district judge of the United States District Court for the Eastern District of Missouri since 2025. He was a judge of the Missouri Court of Appeals from 2021 to 2025.

== Early life and education ==
Stevens was born in 1973 in St. Louis, Missouri, and raised in St. Charles, Missouri. He attended the St. Charles County public schools. He graduated from the University of Missouri with a Bachelor of Arts degree, magna cum laude, in political science in 1995, Phi Beta Kappa. He graduated from University of Missouri School of Law with a Juris Doctor, cum laude, in 1998, Order of the Coif, where he was editor in chief of the Missouri Law Review.

== Career ==
Stevens served as a law clerk for Judge Pasco Bowman II, at the time chief judge of the United States Court of Appeals for the Eighth Circuit, from 1998 to 1999. Cristian engaged in the private practice of law from 1999 to 2002 and again from 2017 to 2019. He served as an assistant United States attorney in the Eastern District of Missouri from 2002 to 2017. He served as the first assistant attorney general and deputy attorney general for the criminal division in the Missouri Attorney General's Office from 2019 to 2021. He served as a judge of the Missouri Court of Appeals from October 2021 to July 2025.

Stevens is a member of the Federalist Society.

=== Federal judicial service ===
On May 6, 2025, President Donald Trump announced his intention to nominate Stevens to an unspecified seat on the United States District Court for the Eastern District of Missouri. On May 12, 2025, his nomination was sent to the Senate. President Trump nominated Stevens to the seat vacated by Judge Audrey G. Fleissig, who assumed senior status on April 14, 2023. On June 26, his nomination was favorably reported out of committee by a 12–10 party-line vote. On July 17, the Senate invoked cloture on his nomination by a 49–43 vote. On July 22, his nomination was confirmed by a 50–47 vote. He received his judicial commission on July 23, 2025.

Legal offices
Preceded by Audrey G. Fleissig	Judge of the United States District Court for the Eastern District of Missouri; 2025–present	Incumbent
