= Charles B. Davis =

American judge

Judge of the United States District Court for the Eastern District of Missouri
- In office January 31, 1924 – March 3, 1943
- Appointed by: Calvin Coolidge
- Preceded by: Seat established by 42 Stat. 837
- Succeeded by: Rubey Mosley Hulen

Personal details
- Born: Charles B. Davis; March 9, 1877 Hannibal, Missouri, U.S.
- Died: March 3, 1943 (aged 65) Hot Springs, Arkansas, U.S.
- Education: University of Missouri (A.B.); University of Missouri School of Law (LL.B.)

Charles B. Davis (March 9, 1877 – March 3, 1943) was a United States district judge of the United States District Court for the Eastern District of Missouri.

== Education and career ==
Born in Hannibal, Missouri, Davis received an Artium Baccalaureus degree from the University of Missouri in 1902 and a Bachelor of Laws from the University of Missouri School of Law in 1905. He was in private practice in St. Louis, Missouri from 1905 to 1909. He was an assistant circuit attorney in St. Louis from 1909 to 1912, returning to private practice from 1912 to 1914, then serving as an associate city counselor for St. Louis from 1914 to 1915. Davis was a Judge of the Circuit Court of Missouri from 1916 to 1924.

== Federal judicial service ==
On January 21, 1924, Davis was nominated by President Calvin Coolidge to a new seat on the United States District Court for the Eastern District of Missouri created by 42 Stat. 837. He was confirmed by the United States Senate on January 31, 1924, and received his commission the same day. Davis served in that capacity until his death on March 3, 1943, in Hot Springs, Arkansas.

== Sources ==
Legal offices
Preceded by Seat established by 42 Stat. 837	Judge of the United States District Court for the Eastern District of Missouri; 1924–1943	Succeeded by Rubey Mosley Hulen
