= Lemma Barkeloo =

American lawyer

- Born: March 26, 1840; Brooklyn, New York, US
- Died: September 11, 1870 (aged 30); St. Louis, Missouri, US
- Education: Moravian College; Washington University in St. Louis
- Occupation: Lawyer

Lemma Barkeloo (1840–1870) was one of the first women in America to attend law school, alongside Phoebe Couzins. She was the first woman admitted to the Missouri bar and the first woman to try a case in an American court.

She was born on March 26, 1840. Her uncle was Teunis G. Bergen, a Congressman from New York. Barkeloo lived in Brooklyn, New York, and graduated with honors from Moravian College in Bethlehem, Pennsylvania.

She began attending Washington University School of Law in 1869. However, she never finished her course work or graduated. Prior to completing her first year, she petitioned to take the Missouri bar without her law degree. On March 25, 1870, she passed the bar exam. The next day, she was the first woman admitted to the Missouri bar. She began to practice law in the offices of Lucien Eaton. Within her first few months of practice she became the first woman to try a case in an American court.

She died from typhoid fever on September 11, 1870.

In 2000 Susan Frelich Appleton, J.D., was installed as the inaugural Lemma Barkeloo and Phoebe Couzins Professor of Law at the Washington University School of Law.

== See also ==
- List of first women lawyers and judges in Missouri
