= Matthew T. Schelp =

American judge (born 1970)

Matthew Schelp
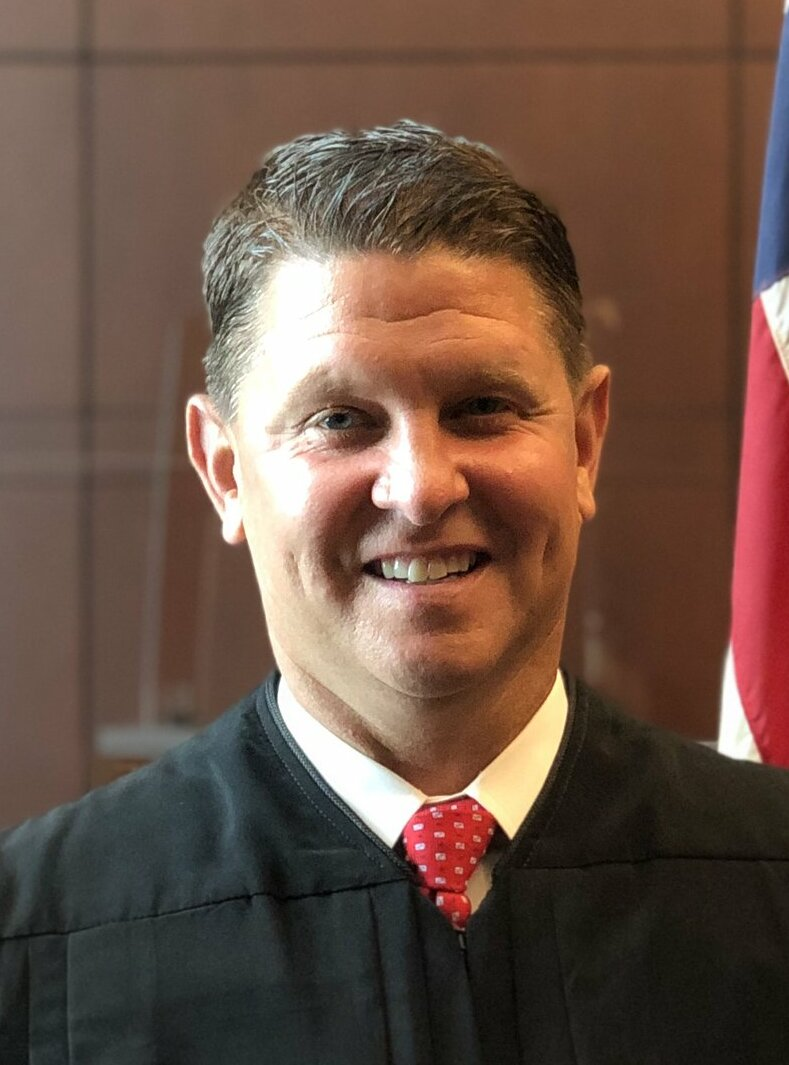
- Schelp in 2020

Judge of the United States District Court for the Eastern District of Missouri
- Incumbent
- Assumed office August 4, 2020
- Appointed by: Donald Trump
- Preceded by: Stephen N. Limbaugh Jr.

Personal details
- Born: 1970 (age 55–56) Kansas City, Missouri, U.S.
- Education: University of Missouri (BSBA, JD)

Military service
- Allegiance: United States
- Branch/service: United States Navy (1996–1999); United States Navy Reserve (2002–2012)
- Rank: Lieutenant Commander
- Unit: United States Navy Judge Advocate General's Corps
- Awards: See list: Navy and Marine Corps Commendation Medal (with Bronze Star) Navy and Marine Corps Achievement Medal

Matthew Thomas Schelp (born 1970) is a United States district judge of the United States District Court for the Eastern District of Missouri.

== Education ==
Schelp earned his Bachelor of Science in Business Administration and Juris Doctor from the University of Missouri.

== Career ==
Upon graduation from law school, Schelp served in the United States Navy's Judge Advocate General's Corps. Schelp served for nearly a decade as an Assistant United States Attorney for the Eastern District of Missouri and co-founded a boutique law firm in St. Louis with Jeffrey Jensen. Prior to becoming a judge, he was a partner at Husch Blackwell in St. Louis, Missouri, where his practice focused on Governance, risk management, and compliance, investigations, and litigation.

=== Military service ===
From 1996 to 1999 Schelp was an active member in the Judge Advocate General's Corps of the U.S. Navy. From 2002 to 2012 he was a Naval Reserve Judge Advocate General.

=== Federal judicial service ===
On November 6, 2019, President Donald Trump announced his intent to nominate Schelp to serve as a United States district judge for the United States District Court for the Eastern District of Missouri. On December 2, 2019, his nomination was sent to the Senate. Trump nominated Schelp to the seat to be vacated by Judge Stephen N. Limbaugh Jr., who subsequently assumed senior status on August 1, 2020. A hearing on his nomination before the Senate Judiciary Committee was held on December 4, 2019. On January 3, 2020, his nomination was returned to the president under Rule XXXI, Paragraph 6 of the United States Senate. Later that day, he was re-nominated to the same seat. On January 16, 2020, his nomination was reported out of committee by a 16–6 vote. On February 11, 2020, the Senate invoked cloture on his nomination by a 72–22 vote. On February 12, 2020, his nomination was confirmed by a 72–23 vote. He received his judicial commission on August 4, 2020.

==== Notable rulings ====
On November 29, 2021 he ruled against a federal vaccination mandate for health care workers in ten states. The opinion was called "misleading" and "highly disingenuous" as it falsely indicated the vaccine did not reduce transmission. The cited filing by the Centers for Medicare & Medicaid Services could not quantify its rule's impact due to uncertainty about the extent of transmission among vaccinated individuals but did state with evidence that it certainly decreased transmission risk.

== Memberships ==
He has been a member of the Federalist Society since 2015.

Legal offices
Preceded by Stephen N. Limbaugh Jr.	Judge of the United States District Court for the Eastern District of Missouri; 2020–present	Incumbent
