= Jean Constance Hamilton =

American judge (born 1945)

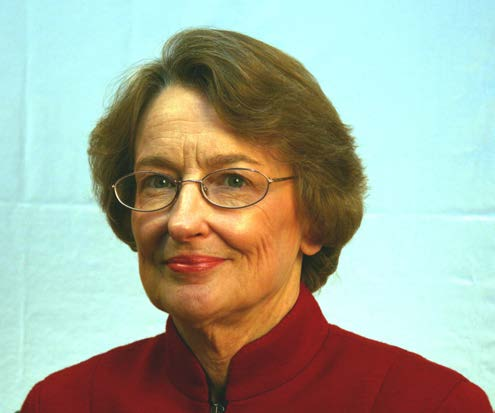

Senior Judge of the United States District Court for the Eastern District of Missouri
- Incumbent
- Assumed office July 1, 2013

Chief Judge of the United States District Court for the Eastern District of Missouri
- In office 1995–2002
- Preceded by: Edward Louis Filippine
- Succeeded by: Carol E. Jackson

Judge of the United States District Court for the Eastern District of Missouri
- In office October 1, 1990 – July 1, 2013
- Appointed by: George H. W. Bush
- Preceded by: John Francis Nangle
- Succeeded by: Ronnie L. White

Personal details
- Born: November 12, 1945 (age 80) St. Louis, Missouri, U.S.
- Education: Wellesley College (BA); Washington University in St. Louis (JD); Yale University (LLM)

Jean Constance Hamilton (born November 12, 1945) is a senior United States district judge of the United States District Court for the Eastern District of Missouri.

== Education and legal career ==
Hamilton was born in St. Louis, Missouri. She received a Bachelor of Arts degree from Wellesley College in 1968, then a Juris Doctor from Washington University School of Law in 1971, and a Master of Laws from Yale Law School in 1982. She was an attorney with the Civil Rights Division of the United States Department of Justice in Washington, D.C. from 1971 to 1973. She was then an assistant United States attorney for the Eastern District of Missouri from 1973 to 1978. She was corporate counsel to Southwestern Bell Telephone Company in St. Louis from 1978 to 1981.

== Judicial career ==
=== State judicial service ===
In 1982, Hamilton became a circuit judge for Missouri's Twenty-second Judicial Circuit, and in 1988, she was elevated to the Missouri Court of Appeals, Eastern District. During her service as a state court judge, Hamilton was an adjunct professor, teaching at Saint Louis University Law School from 1986 to 1987, and in 1989, and at Washington University School of Law from 1987 to 1992.

=== Federal judicial service ===
On August 3, 1990, President George H. W. Bush nominated Hamilton to a seat on the United States District Court for the Eastern District of Missouri vacated by Judge John Francis Nangle. She was confirmed by the United States Senate on September 28, 1990, and received her commission on October 1, 1990. She served as Chief Judge from 1995 to 2002. She took senior status on July 1, 2013 and inactive senior status in December 2022.

== Sources ==
Legal offices
Preceded by John Francis Nangle	Judge of the United States District Court for the Eastern District of Missouri; 1990–2013	Succeeded by Ronnie L. White
Preceded by Edward Louis Filippine	Chief Judge of the United States District Court for the Eastern District of Missouri; 1995–2002	Succeeded by Carol E. Jackson
