= E. Richard Webber =

American judge (born 1942)

Ernest Richard Webber Jr.
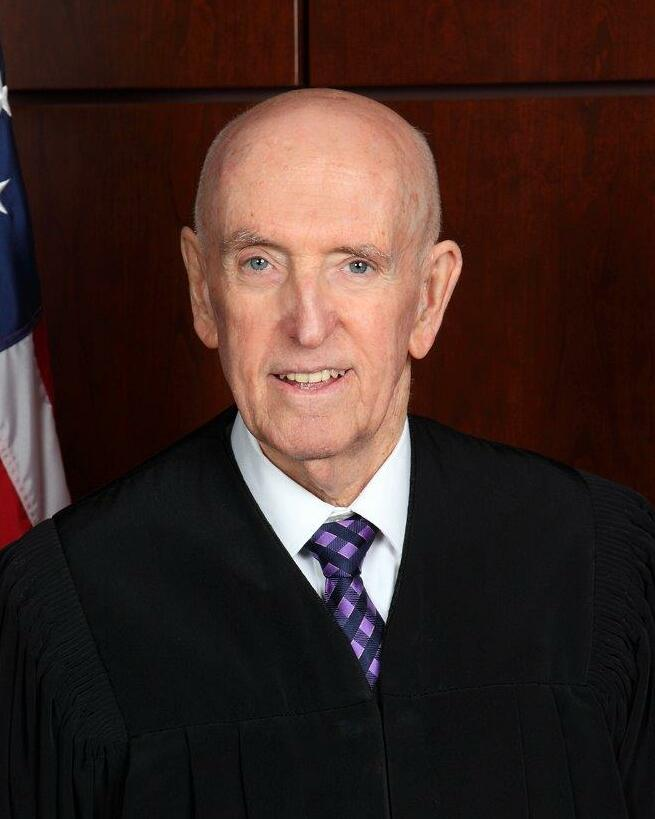

Judge of the United States District Court for the Eastern District of Missouri
- In office December 26, 1995 – September 30, 2022
- Appointed by: Bill Clinton
- Preceded by: Edward Louis Filippine
- Succeeded by: Audrey G. Fleissig

Personal details
- Born: Ernest Richard Webber Jr. June 4, 1942 (age 84) Kahoka, Missouri, U.S.
- Education: University of Missouri (BS, JD)

Ernest Richard Webber Jr. (born June 4, 1942) is a senior United States district judge of the United States District Court for the Eastern District of Missouri.

== Education and career ==
Webber was born in Kahoka, Missouri. He received a Bachelor of Science degree from the University of Missouri in 1964, and a Juris Doctor from University of Missouri School of Law in 1967. He moved to Memphis, Missouri, and served as a prosecuting attorney for several counties in Missouri: for Schuyler County from 1967 to 1975, for Scotland County from 1969 to 1971, and for Putnam County in 1968. He was also a circuit court judge for the first Judicial Circuit of Missouri from 1979 to 1996.

=== Federal judicial service ===
Webber was nominated by President Bill Clinton on August 10, 1995 to serve as a United States district judge of the United States District Court for the Eastern District of Missouri, to a seat vacated by Judge Edward Louis Filippine. He was confirmed by the United States Senate on December 22, 1995, and received his commission on December 26, 1995. He assumed senior status on June 30, 2009 and inactive senior status in September 2022.

Legal offices
Preceded by Edward Louis Filippine	Judge of the United States District Court for the Eastern District of Missouri; 1995–2009	Succeeded by Audrey G. Fleissig
