= Leona P. Thurman =

Kansas City's first African American female lawyer

Leona Thurman
- Born: July 1, 1911; Russellville, Arkansas, U.S.
- Died: May 1, 1985 (aged 73); Kansas City, Missouri, U.S.
- Other name: Leona Pouncey
- Education: Henderson Business College; Howard University (LLB)

Leona Pouncey Thurman (1911–1985) was an American attorney who became Kansas City, Missouri's first African American female lawyer. She was also Missouri's first African American female lawyer to practice before the Supreme Court of the United States.

== Early life and education ==
She was born on July 1, 1911, in Russellville, Arkansas. Before settling in Kansas City, Missouri, she attended the Henderson Business College in Memphis, Tennessee. She earned her law degree in 1949 from Howard University School of Law

== Career ==
After earning her Bachelor of Laws in 1949, she became the first African American female lawyer in Kansas City.

In 1962, she became the first African American female from Missouri admitted to practice before the U.S. Supreme Court. Additionally, Thurman served as the President of the Southwest Bar Association.

== Personal life ==
Thuman married her first husband, James D. Pouncey, in 1937, and pursued a legal career after his death. She married a second time in 1957 to A. Odell Thurman, a school administrator. Thuman died on May 1, 1985, in Kansas City, Missouri.

== See also ==
- List of first women lawyers and judges in Missouri
