= Lincoln University School of Law =

American university law school, 1939–1955

- Active: 1939–1955
- Parent institution: Lincoln University
- Location: St. Louis, Missouri, United States
- Fate: Merged into the University of Missouri School of Law

Lincoln University School of Law was a professional graduate school of Lincoln University (a historically Black university), which operated in St. Louis, Missouri from September 20, 1939, until it closed in 1955. Although Lincoln University’s campus was located in Jefferson City, Missouri, the law school was established in St. Louis because university officials believed that student enrollment would be better in an urban-centered program and that the St. Louis location offered students opportunities to meet with practicing lawyers and that faculty from the two white university law schools in the St. Louis area might be available as part-time lecturers at the new law school.

== History ==
Lincoln University School of Law was established during that period of history in the United States when African-Americans were subjected to segregation and was established as a result of the practice of segregation. As in many other states, African-Americans were permitted to engage in the practice of law but were not accepted as students in any of the state’s law schools because of laws and customs that segregated African-Americans from participation as students in law schools in the state, but which provided such educational opportunities solely to white students.

Prior to the establishment of Lincoln University School of Law those African-Americans who desired to enter the practice law in Missouri were forced by the circumstances to obtain their legal education from law schools outside of the state before they could seek admission to the bar of Missouri. These circumstances changed, however, after the decision of the United States Supreme Court in Missouri ex rel. Gaines v. Canada, 305 U.S. 337 (1938), which held that the State of Missouri must provide in-state legal education to African-Americans because it provided such education to white students. As a result of the court case, the Missouri General Assembly passed a bill which provided $275,000 for the creation and establishment of a law school for African-Americans, the Lincoln University School of Law, which opened its doors on September 20, 1939, with 31 students enrolled. Thus, it is one of the very few law schools in the United States to have been established as the result of a lawsuit.

Lincoln University School of Law attained full accreditation by the American Bar Association in 1939 and became a member of the American Association of Law Libraries in December 1939. It was approved by the Missouri Board of Law Examiners in February 1940 and awarded membership in the Association of American Law Schools in December 1941.

The first Dean of the law school was William L. Taylor (1941–1943), who was succeeded by Scovel Richardson (1944–1953). The last Dean of the school was Daniel W. Bowles (1954–1955) Members of the faculty the first year were Daniel W. Bowles, James C. Bush, Scovel Richardson, Myron B. Bush, H. Wilson Gray, Silas E. Garner and Virgh Lucas (Librarian). The first graduates of the law school were Dorothy L. Freeman, A. Alphonse Lenoir and Betty Stuart. By 1954 the number of law students had decreased to 12 and the law school ceased operation because its expense constituted a drain on the university’s meager resources. It was merged with the University of Missouri School of Law. By its final year of operation, it had graduated 79 students to 14 States and the District of Columbia.

== Location ==
The school was established in the former Poro Beauty College building, a three-story structure which existed at 4310 St. Ferdinand Avenue in St. Louis until it was razed in 1965. The location currently includes the St. James AME Church and the James House, the latter of which is high-rise housing and a part of the St. Louis Housing Authority.

== Notable faculty and alumni ==
Name	Born	Died	Positions and Recognition	Notes
George Howard, Jr.	05/13/1924	04/21/2007	Justice, Arkansas Supreme Court (1977-1978).; Arkansas Court of Appeals (1979).; U.S. District Court, Eastern and Western Districts of Arkansas (1980-2007).	
Hosea T. Lockard	6/24/1920	12/12/2011	Shelby County Tennessee Quarterly Court, elected 1964, served until 1967; Administrative Assistant, Tennessee Governor Buford Ellington, 1967–1971; Judge, Shelby County Criminal Court, 1975–1994; Board Member, National Civil Rights Museum, 1989–1999|; Benjamin L. Hooks Award, Memphis Bar Foundation, 2010	Interred West Tennessee Veterans Cemetery, Memphis.
Scovel Richardson	2/4/1912; Nashville, TN	3/30/1982	President, National Bar Association, 1951; Associate Professor, Dean (1939–1953); Member, U.S. Board of Parole and Probation (1953–1957, Chair, 1954–1957); Judge, United States Customs Court, 1957 - 1980; U.S. Court of International Trade, 1980 - 1982	Funeral, New Rochelle, NY Presbyterian Church.
Margaret Bush Wilson	1/30/1919	8/11/ 2009	Second African-American woman admitted to practice law in Missouri, 1943; U.S. Attorney, Rural Electrification Administration; Assistant Attorney General, State of Missouri; Chair, N.A.A.C.P. Board of Directors(1975–1984)	

== See also ==
- List of defunct law schools in the United States
