= David Hungate =

American bassist (born 1948)

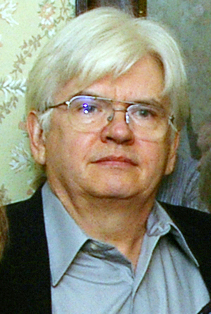
- Hungate in 2007

Background information
- Born: William David Hungate; August 5, 1948 (age 78); Troy, Missouri, U.S.
- Genres: Pop rock; jazz fusion; smooth jazz; funk; country; new wave
- Occupations: Musician; songwriter; producer
- Instruments: bass; guitar; trombone
- Years active: 1971–2015
- Formerly of: Toto

William David Hungate (born August 5, 1948) is an American retired bassist noted as a member of the Los Angeles pop-rock band Toto from 1976 to 1982 and again from 2014 to 2015, and the son of judge William L. Hungate. Along with most of his Toto bandmates, Hungate did sessions on a number of hit albums of the 1970s, including Boz Scaggs's Silk Degrees album and Alice Cooper's From the Inside album.

== Career ==
Hungate moved to Los Angeles in the 1970s to work as a session musician. It was through his session work where he met his future Toto bandmates including David Paich and Jeff Porcaro. They approached him about starting a band, and while Hungate was initially uninterested in working in a band full-time, he joined as the bassist, while, like the other members in the band, continuing to work as a session musician. He was said to be the one who came up with the band's name, Toto.

Hungate played on Toto's first four records, including the Grammy award-winning album Toto IV. He left the band shortly after its release for a career as a session musician in Nashville. He relocated to the city in 1981, as session work began to decline in Los Angeles and he and his wife did not want to raise their family near Hollywood. He stated the distance from his bandmates in Los Angeles, the age gap between him and the other members of Toto (he was around 6–9 years older), plus the long touring schedules away from his family, were the reasons for his departure.

Hungate, who plays many instruments including guitar, trombone, trumpet, drums and piano, has arranged, produced and recorded with several country artists such as Chet Atkins. He was also a primary member of AOR supergroup Mecca fronted by Joe Vana and Fergie Frederiksen, the latter also of Toto fame. Hungate's publishing company, Brownie Music, was signed by Keeling & Co in 1988 to manage Hungate's copyright and publishing. In 1990, he released a solo album entitled Souvenir, with Jeff Porcaro playing drums on some of the tracks on the album. In 1995, Hungate also played bass on all of the songs on Shania Twain's second album The Woman in Me.

In 2014, he rejoined Toto in a touring capacity due to the departure of the touring bass player, Nathan East, who, like Leland Sklar during the band's previous tour in 2007/2008, filled in for bassist Mike Porcaro after he retired from touring due to an illness. At first, it was announced that he would retire after the 2014 tour, but he kept touring with Toto until 2015, when he retired from extensive tours. He also played on four tracks on the band's album Toto XIV.

== Influences ==
Hungate has cited Carol Kaye, Jim Fielder, Jack Bruce, James Jamerson, Chuck Rainey, Joe Osborn, Max Bennett, and Jerry Jemmott as influences on his bass playing.

== Other ==
Hungate attended Troy Buchanan High School in Troy, Missouri. Because he attended there, the band Toto gave the high school a signed record, and now during parades the high school band plays the song "Hold the Line".

He attended the College of Music at North Texas State University. He played bass in their jazz ensemble, the One O'Clock Lab Band, including a performance at the 1970 Montreux Jazz Festival.

He is the son of U.S. Congressman (and later Federal District Judge) William L. Hungate.

== Discography ==
- Souvenir (1990) [reissued in 1994]
