= John Francis Nangle =

American judge

Senior Judge of the United States District Court for the Eastern District of Missouri
- In office May 10, 1990 – August 24, 2008

Chief Judge of the United States District Court for the Eastern District of Missouri
- In office 1983–1990
- Preceded by: Harris Kenneth Wangelin
- Succeeded by: Edward Louis Filippine

Judge of the United States District Court for the Eastern District of Missouri
- In office July 18, 1973 – May 10, 1990
- Appointed by: Richard Nixon
- Preceded by: William H. Webster
- Succeeded by: Jean Constance Hamilton

Personal details
- Born: John Francis Nangle; June 8, 1922 St. Louis, Missouri, U.S.
- Died: August 24, 2008 (aged 86) Savannah, Georgia, U.S.
- Education: Harris Teachers College (A.A.); University of Missouri (B.S.); Washington University in St. Louis (J.D.)

John Francis Nangle (June 8, 1922 – August 24, 2008) was a United States district judge of the United States District Court for the Eastern District of Missouri.

== Education and career ==
Born in St. Louis, Missouri, Nangle received an Associate of Arts degree from Harris Teachers College (now Harris–Stowe State University) in 1941, a Bachelor of Science degree from the University of Missouri in 1943, and a Juris Doctor from Washington University School of Law in 1948. He was in the United States Army as a Sergeant from 1943 to 1946. He was in the United States Army Reserve as a Captain in the JAG Corps from 1946 to 1971. He was in private practice in St. Louis and Clayton, Missouri from 1948 to 1973. He was city attorney of Brentwood, Missouri from 1953 to 1963. He was a special legal adviser for the Government of St. Louis County from 1963 to 1973.

== Federal judicial service ==
Nangle was nominated by President Richard Nixon on June 13, 1973, to a seat on the United States District Court for the Eastern District of Missouri vacated by Judge William H. Webster. He was confirmed by the United States Senate on July 13, 1973, and received his commission on July 18, 1973. He served as Chief Judge from 1983 to 1990. He assumed senior status on May 10, 1990. Nangle served in that capacity until his death on August 24, 2008, in Savannah, Georgia. Nangle moved to Savannah in 1990 immediately after taking senior status and sat with the United States District Court for the Southern District of Georgia until just a few months before his death.

== Sources ==
Legal offices
Preceded by William H. Webster	Judge of the United States District Court for the Eastern District of Missouri; 1973–1990	Succeeded by Jean Constance Hamilton
Preceded by Harris Kenneth Wangelin	Chief Judge of the United States District Court for the Eastern District of Missouri; 1983–1990	Succeeded by Edward Louis Filippine
