= John Keating Regan =

American judge

Senior Judge of the United States District Court for the Eastern District of Missouri
- In office April 7, 1977 – March 9, 1987

Judge of the United States District Court for the Eastern District of Missouri
- In office April 3, 1962 – April 7, 1977
- Appointed by: John F. Kennedy
- Preceded by: Randolph Henry Weber
- Succeeded by: Edward Louis Filippine

Personal details
- Born: John Keating Regan; March 26, 1911 St. Louis, Missouri, U.S.
- Died: March 9, 1987 (aged 75)
- Education: Benton College of Law (LL.B.)

John Keating Regan (March 26, 1911 – March 9, 1987) was a United States district judge of the United States District Court for the Eastern District of Missouri.

== Education and career ==
Born in St. Louis, Missouri, Regan received a Bachelor of Laws from Benton College of Law (now defunct) in 1934. He was in private practice in St. Louis from 1935 to 1939, and was an assistant prosecuting attorney of St. Louis from 1939 to 1942. He was a lieutenant in the United States Navy during World War II, from 1942 to 1945. He returned to private practice in St. Louis from 1945 to 1949. He was a judge of the Eighth Judicial Circuit Court of Missouri from 1949 to 1962.

== Federal judicial service ==
On March 5, 1962, Regan was nominated by President John F. Kennedy to a seat on the United States District Court for the Eastern District of Missouri vacated by Judge Randolph Henry Weber. Regan was confirmed by the United States Senate on April 2, 1962, and received his commission on April 3, 1962. He was a Judge of the Temporary Emergency Court of Appeals from 1977 to 1987. He assumed senior status on April 7, 1977, serving in that capacity until his death on March 9, 1987.

== Sources ==
Legal offices
Preceded by Randolph Henry Weber	Judge of the United States District Court for the Eastern District of Missouri; 1962–1977	Succeeded by Edward Louis Filippine
