= William L. Hungate =

American politician and judge (1922–2007)

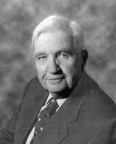

Senior Judge of the United States District Court for the Eastern District of Missouri
- In office October 1, 1991 – June 30, 1992

Judge of the United States District Court for the Eastern District of Missouri
- In office September 26, 1979 – October 1, 1991
- Appointed by: Jimmy Carter
- Preceded by: Seat established by 92 Stat. 1629
- Succeeded by: Carol E. Jackson

Member of the U.S. House of Representatives from Missouri's 9th district
- In office November 3, 1964 – January 3, 1977
- Preceded by: Clarence Cannon
- Succeeded by: Harold Volkmer

Personal details
- Born: William Leonard Hungate; December 14, 1922 Benton, Illinois, U.S.
- Died: June 22, 2007 (aged 84) Chesterfield, Missouri, U.S.
- Party: Democratic
- Education: University of Missouri (AB); Harvard Law School (LLB)

William Leonard Hungate (December 14, 1922 – June 22, 2007) was a United States representative from Missouri from November 3, 1964 (special election upon the death of Congressman Clarence Cannon), to January 3, 1977, representing the Ninth Congressional District. Following his retirement from the United States House of Representatives, Hungate was appointed to serve as a United States district judge of the United States District Court for the Eastern District of Missouri in 1979 by President Jimmy Carter, where he served until his retirement in 1992. He is also the father of musician David Hungate.

== Early years and education ==
Hungate was born in Benton, Illinois, on December 14, 1922, and graduated from Bowling Green High School in Bowling Green, Missouri, in 1940. He initially attended the University of Michigan, transferring to the University of Missouri in Columbia, Missouri, receiving an Artium Baccalaureus degree in 1943. He received his Bachelor of Laws in 1948 from Harvard Law School. In 1969, he was awarded a Doctor of Jurisprudence degree from Harvard Law School.

== World War II military service ==
Hungate served in the United States Army from 1943 to 1946, where he received the Combat Infantryman Badge, 3 Battle stars, and Bronze Star. He served in England, France and Germany throughout World War II.

== Legal career and politics ==
Hungate was admitted to the Missouri bar in 1948 and the Illinois Bar in 1949 and immediately entered private law practice in Troy, Missouri, from 1948 to 1968. He was then elected prosecuting attorney of Lincoln County, Missouri, serving from 1951 to 1956. From 1958 to 1964, he served as a Missouri Special Assistant Attorney General. On November 3, 1964, he was elected as a Democrat simultaneously to the 88th Congress to fill the vacancy caused by the death of Representative Clarence Cannon, and to the 89th Congress. He was reelected to the five succeeding Congresses, serving until January 3, 1977. Hungate voted in favor of the Voting Rights Act of 1965 but against Civil Rights Act of 1968.

Hungate was a member of the House Judiciary Committee. He participated in the 1974 impeachment process against Richard Nixon, and sponsored the second article of impeachment against Nixon charging him with abuse of power. Later that same year, as chairman of the Judiciary Committee's subcommittee on criminal justice, he led the congressional review of the presidential pardon of Nixon by Nixon's successor, Gerald Ford.

Lamenting that politics had gone "from the age of Camelot, where all things were possible, to the age of Watergate, when all things were suspect," Hungate chose not to run for re-election to the 95th Congress in 1976. He was succeeded by Harold Volkmer.

== Federal judicial service ==
Hungate was nominated by President Jimmy Carter on May 17, 1979, to the United States District Court for the Eastern District of Missouri, to a new seat created by 92 Stat. 1629. He was confirmed by the United States Senate on September 25, 1979, and received his commission on September 26, 1979. He assumed senior status on October 1, 1991. His service was terminated on June 30, 1992, due to retirement. As District Judge, Hungate presided over the St. Louis public school desegregation case, and was instrumental in designing a voluntary desegregation plan for the St. Louis City and County School Districts.

== Notable case ==
One of the most significant findings by Hungate in the St. Louis desegregation case was, with respect to school segregation in St. Louis City and County, the "State of Missouri, which prior to 1954 mandated school segregation, never took any effective steps to dismantle the dual system it had compelled by constitution, statutory law, practice and policy." Liddell et al. v. Bd. of Ed. of City of St. Louis, et al., 491 F.Supp. 351, 357, (E.D. Mo. 1980) aff'd, 667 F.2d 643 (8th Cir.), cert. denied, 454 U.S. 1081 (1981). He concluded that "the State defendants stand before the Court as primary constitutional wrongdoers who have abdicated their remedial duty. Their efforts to pass the buck among themselves and other state instrumentalities must be rejected." Id. at 359.

== Post judicial activities ==
During his retirement, he was the author of It Wasn't Funny at the Time, a collection of photographs and anecdotes from his college years, World War II, life in congress and during his judgeship, published in 1994; and Glimpses of Politics (Red, White & Blue Jokes), published in 1996.

== Death ==
Hungate was hospitalized on June 6, 2007, at St. Luke's Hospital in Chesterfield, Missouri for a hematoma that was likely caused by a fall at his home. He died on June 22, 2007, while in intensive care at St. Luke's Hospital. He was survived by his wife, Dorothy; a son, David (who was the original bass player for the rock band Toto); a daughter, Katie Wood; and four grandchildren.

U.S. House of Representatives
Preceded by Clarence Cannon	Member of the U.S. House of Representatives from Missouri's 9th congressional district 1964–1977	Succeeded by Harold Volkmer
Legal offices
Preceded by Seat established by 92 Stat. 1629	Judge of the United States District Court for the Eastern District of Missouri; 1979–1991	Succeeded by Carol E. Jackson
