= Stephen N. Limbaugh Jr. =

American judge (born 1952)

Stephen Nathaniel Limbaugh Jr.
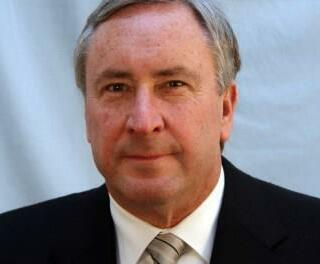

Senior Judge of the United States District Court for the Eastern District of Missouri
- Incumbent
- Assumed office August 1, 2020

Judge of the United States District Court for the Eastern District of Missouri
- In office August 1, 2008 – August 1, 2020
- Appointed by: George W. Bush
- Preceded by: Donald J. Stohr
- Succeeded by: Matthew T. Schelp

Chief Justice of Missouri
- In office July 1, 2001 – June 30, 2003
- Preceded by: William Ray Price Jr.
- Succeeded by: Ronnie L. White

Judge of the Supreme Court of Missouri
- In office 1992–2008
- Appointed by: John Ashcroft
- Preceded by: Albert L. Rendlen
- Succeeded by: Zel Fischer

Personal details
- Born: Stephen Nathaniel Limbaugh Jr. January 25, 1952 (age 74) Cape Girardeau, Missouri, U.S.
- Parent: Stephen N. Limbaugh Sr. (father)
- Relatives: Limbaugh family
- Education: Southern Methodist University (BA, JD); University of Virginia (LLM)

Stephen Nathaniel Limbaugh Jr. (born January 25, 1952) is a senior United States district judge of the United States District Court for the Eastern District of Missouri. From 1992 to 2008, he served as a judge on the Supreme Court of Missouri.

== Education ==
Limbaugh was born in Cape Girardeau, Missouri, and is the son of retired federal district judge Stephen N. Limbaugh Sr., grandson of attorney Rush Limbaugh Sr., and a cousin of prominent political commentators Rush and David Limbaugh. He earned his Bachelor of Arts degree in 1973 from Southern Methodist University. He received a Juris Doctor from the Dedman School of Law at Southern Methodist University in 1976. In 1998, he received a Master of Laws in judicial process from the University of Virginia School of Law.

== Career ==
Following a stint in private practice in Cape Girardeau, Limbaugh was elected as Prosecuting Attorney of Cape Girardeau County at the age of 26 in 1978, serving one four-year term before returning to private practice in 1982. Beginning in 1987, he served as a Judge for the 32nd state Judicial Circuit, serving until his appointment to the Supreme Court of Missouri in 1992. From 2001 to 2003, he served one term as the state's chief justice.

== Federal judicial service ==
On December 6, 2007, President George W. Bush nominated Judge Limbaugh to the United States District Court for the Eastern District of Missouri to fill the seat vacated by Donald J. Stohr. He was confirmed by the United States Senate on June 10, 2008, received his commission on August 1, 2008, and was succeeded on the Missouri Supreme Court by Judge Zel Fischer. He assumed senior status on August 1, 2020.

== Personal ==
Limbaugh currently lives in Cape Girardeau with his wife, the former Marsha D. Moore. They have two grown sons, one of them being musician Stephen Limbaugh III, and the other Cole County circuit court judge Christopher Limbaugh.

Legal offices
Preceded by Donald J. Stohr	Judge of the United States District Court for the Eastern District of Missouri; 2008–2020	Succeeded by Matthew T. Schelp
