= Edward Louis Filippine =

American judge (born 1930)

Senior Judge of the United States District Court for the Eastern District of Missouri
- Incumbent
- Assumed office June 11, 1995

Chief Judge of the United States District Court for the Eastern District of Missouri
- In office 1990–1995
- Preceded by: John Francis Nangle
- Succeeded by: Jean Constance Hamilton

Judge of the United States District Court for the Eastern District of Missouri
- In office July 22, 1977 – June 11, 1995
- Appointed by: Jimmy Carter
- Preceded by: John Keating Regan
- Succeeded by: E. Richard Webber

Personal details
- Born: June 11, 1930 (age 95) St. Louis, Missouri, U.S.
- Education: Saint Louis University (AB, JD)

Edward Louis Filippine (born June 11, 1930) is an inactive senior United States district judge of the United States District Court for the Eastern District of Missouri.

== Education and career ==
Born in St. Louis, Filippine received an Artium Baccalaureus degree from Saint Louis University in 1951. He was a lieutenant in the United States Air Force from 1951 to 1953 and was stationed at Hondo Air Base, Texas. After serving in the Air Force, he received a Juris Doctor from Saint Louis University School of Law in 1957. He was in private practice in Clayton, Missouri and St. Louis for various periods from 1957 to 1977, in addition to serving as a special assistant state attorney general of Missouri from 1963 to 1964. He was also a staff assistant to United States Senator Thomas Eagleton in St. Louis, from 1969 to 1974, and was Senator Eagleton's campaign director in 1974.

=== Federal judicial service ===
On June 22, 1977, Filippine was nominated by President Jimmy Carter to a seat on the United States District Court for the Eastern District of Missouri vacated by Judge John Keating Regan. Filippine was confirmed by the United States Senate on July 21, 1977, and received his commission the following day. He served as chief judge from 1990 to 1995, assuming senior status on June 11, 1995. He is currently in inactive senior status, meaning that while he remains a federal judge, he does not hear cases or participate in the business of the court.

== See also ==
- List of United States federal judges by longevity of service

== Sources ==
Legal offices
| Preceded by John Keating Regan | Judge of the United States District Court for the Eastern District of Missouri; 1977–1995 | Succeeded by E. Richard Webber |
| Preceded by John Francis Nangle | Chief Judge of the United States District Court for the Eastern District of Missouri; 1990–1995 | Succeeded by Jean Constance Hamilton |
