= Rush Limbaugh Sr. =

American jurist, legislator, and ambassador (1891–1996)

Member of the Missouri House of Representatives from the Cape Girardeau County district
- In office 1931–1932

Personal details
- Born: Rush Hudson Limbaugh; September 27, 1891 Bollinger County, Missouri, U.S.
- Died: April 8, 1996 (aged 104) Cape Girardeau, Missouri, U.S.
- Party: Republican
- Spouse: Beulah Maude Seabaugh
- Children: Stephen N. Limbaugh Sr.
- Relatives: Limbaugh family
- Education: University of Missouri
- Occupation: Jurist, lawyer, legislator, ambassador

Rush Hudson Limbaugh I (September 27, 1891 – April 8, 1996) was an American politician and ambassador. His legal career spanned nearly 80 years, and he argued cases before the Missouri Supreme Court, Internal Revenue Service Appellate Division, Interstate Commerce Commission, and National Labor Relations Board. He is the grandfather of radio commentator Rush Limbaugh.

== Biography ==
=== Early years ===
Limbaugh was born near Sedgewickville, Missouri, in Bollinger County, Missouri, the son of Susan Frances (Presnell) and Joseph Headley Limbaugh. He was of part German ancestry. He was initially educated in a one-room schoolhouse near his family farm. In 1914, he entered the University of Missouri School of Law following his attendance at the University of Missouri, and although he did not complete law school, he was admitted to the Missouri bar in 1916.

=== Career ===
Limbaugh was the city attorney for Cape Girardeau, Missouri, from 1917 until 1919. He began to take an active interest in politics during this period and in 1919 was among those signing a convention call to establish a new progressive political organization, the Committee of 48.

Limbaugh began his own law firm in 1923. He served as city councilor of Cape Girardeau from 1924 until 1930. He served in the Missouri State Legislature as a Republican from 1931 to 1932, and during his service advocated the consolidation of Missouri school districts and the formation of the Missouri State Highway Patrol.

Limbaugh was Chair of the American Bar Association's Section of Real Property, Probate and Trust Law (1954–1955) and President of the Missouri Bar (1955–1956). He also served as an ambassador for the U.S. legal system to India during the 1950s. When he retired from his law practice at age 102, he was reportedly the oldest practicing attorney in the United States.

In addition to his legal career, Limbaugh was active in civic affairs. He was involved in the early development of Southeast Missouri Hospital, was active with the Boy Scout movement and worked with the Salvation Army for nearly fifty years.

=== Death and legacy ===
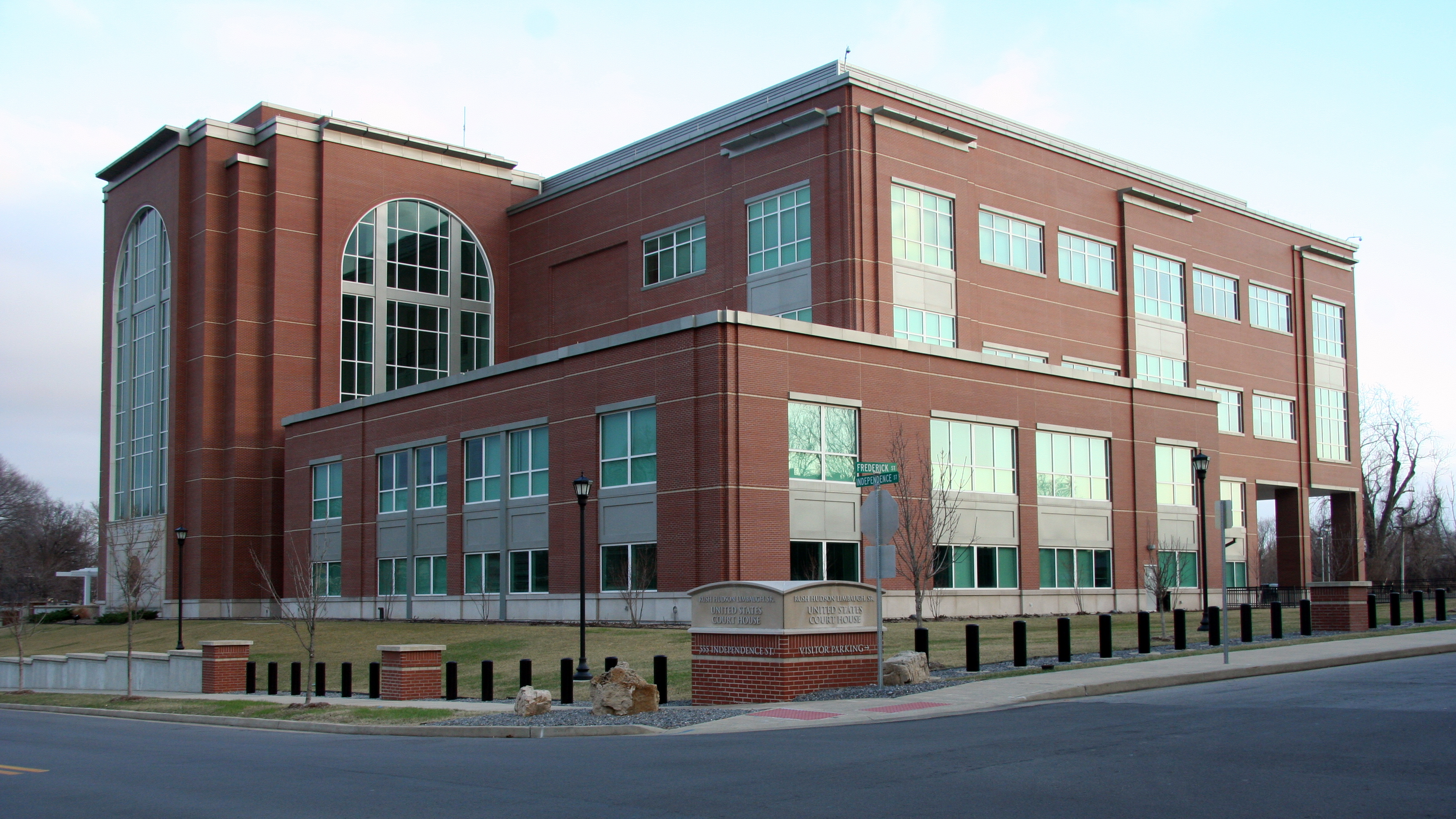
Rush Hudson Limbaugh Sr. United States Courthouse in Cape Girardeau

Rush Limbaugh Sr. died on April 8, 1996. He was 104 years old at the time of his death.

Limbaugh's descendants include jurists Stephen N. Limbaugh Sr., Stephen N. Limbaugh Jr., and grandsons radio commentator Rush H. Limbaugh III and attorney and political commentator David Limbaugh.

In 2007, the Rush Hudson Limbaugh Sr. United States Courthouse located in Cape Girardeau, Missouri, was named after him by the 110th United States Congress via Public Law 110-13.
