= Phoebe Couzins =

American lawyer

Phoebe Wilson Couzins
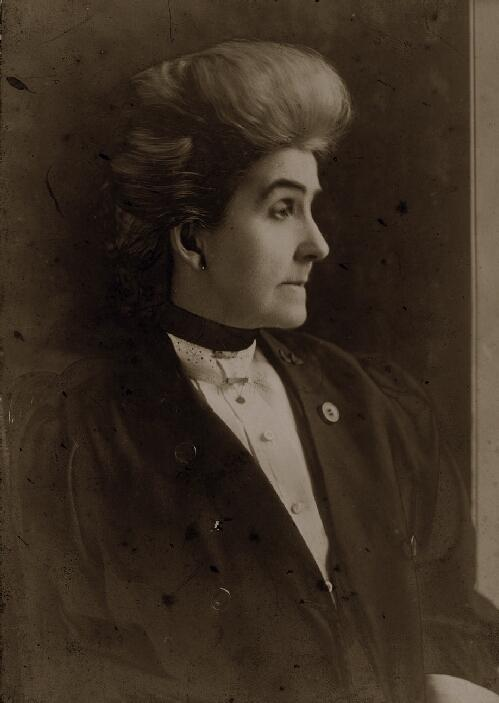
- Phoebe W. Couzins, ca. 1904

Personal details
- Born: September 8, 1842 St. Louis, Missouri
- Died: December 6, 1913 (aged 71) St. Louis, Missouri
- Resting place: Bellefontaine Cemetery
- Education: Washington University in St. Louis

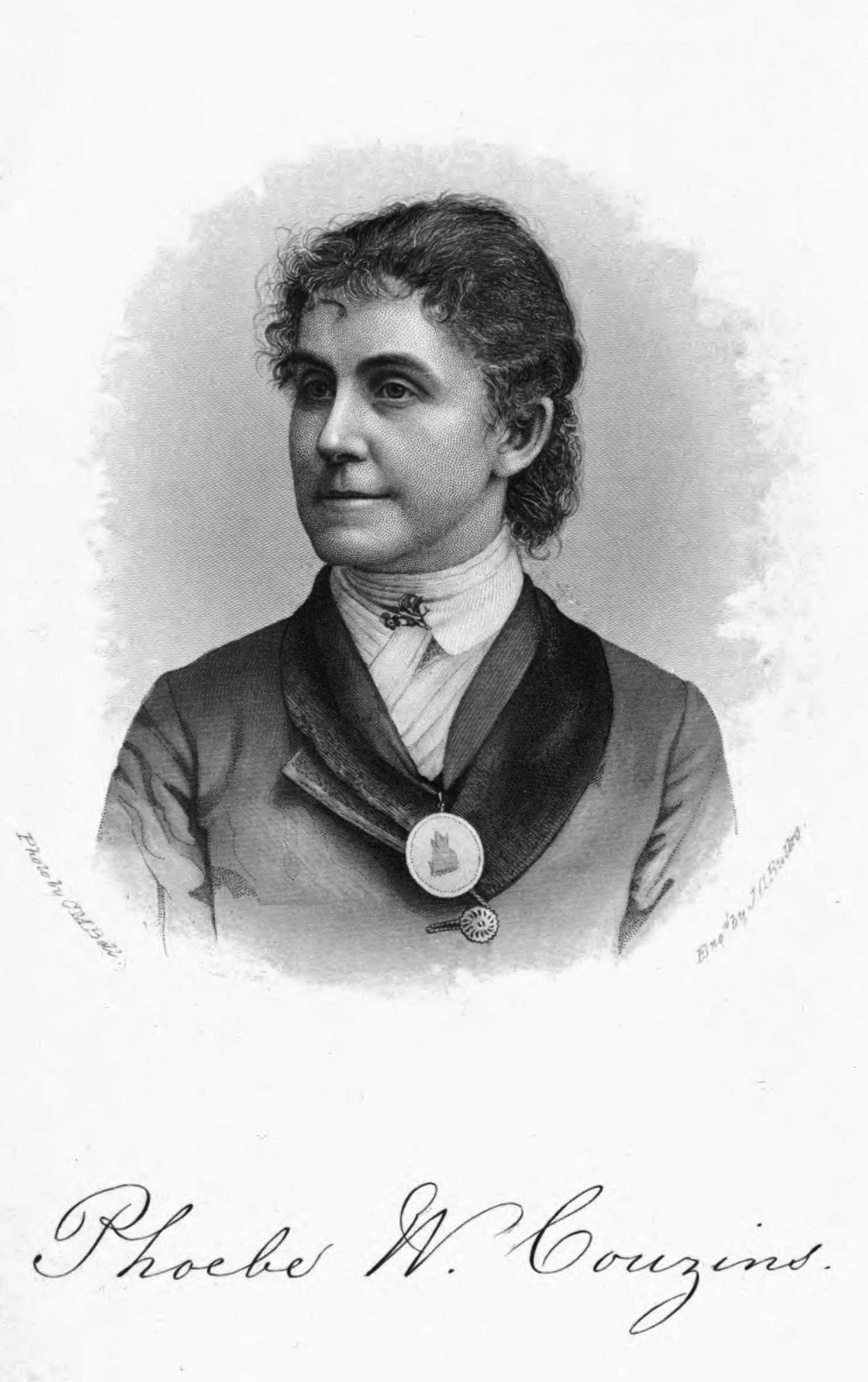
Phoebe Couzins

Phoebe Wilson Couzins (September 8, 1842 – December 6, 1913) was one of the first female lawyers in the United States. She was the second woman to serve as a licensed attorney in Missouri and the third or fourth to be a licensed attorney in the United States. She was the first woman admitted to the Utah bar, and was also admitted to the Missouri, Kansas, and Dakota Territory bars. She was the first female appointed to the U.S. Marshal service. After her career in law, she played an active part in the Suffrage movement.

== Early life ==
Couzins was born to Adaline and John E.D. Couzins. John Couzins was the chief of police during the Civil War in St. Louis, Missouri. In 1884 he was appointed U.S. marshal of the Eastern District of Missouri by President Chester Arthur. Her mother was active in charity work and volunteered as a nurse. During the American Civil War, both Phoebe and Adaline helped organize the Western Sanitary Commission, which offered medical aid to wounded soldiers in places without hospitals. During St Louis's 1849 cholera epidemic, both Adaline and John lead relief efforts. Adaline also actively contributed to the movement for women's suffrage. Phoebe and Adaline were both members of the St. Louis Woman Suffrage Association, where Phoebe drew attention as a public speaker.

Inspired by Professor John M. Krum, Couzins submitted an application to study law at the new Washington University in St. Louis. Her application was accepted by all sixteen members of the Application board, and her historic acceptance opened the gates for women to study law in Washington University. In 1869, Couzins began her studies at the university's law school, and earned her L.L.B degree in 1871, as one of only nine people in her class. Couzins became the first female graduate of Washington University. At her graduation a banquet was held in her honor. Couzins was licensed to practice law in the federal courts, Missouri, Arkansas, Utah, and Kansas. However, she chose a career in public speaking.

== Career ==
Even prior to beginning her studies, she was the Missouri delegate to the American Equal Rights Association meeting in New York. She established a practice in St. Louis, and was admitted to the bar in four states. Couzins was described as a riveting orator and lectured across the United States. In 1884, she testified before the U.S. House Judiciary Committee on the legal status of women.

In 1884, John Couzins became U.S. marshal for the Eastern District of Missouri and he made Phoebe one of his deputies. As his health failed, Phoebe started taking over some of his duties. Upon his death in 1887, Couzins became the first female U.S. Marshal in the country, a position which she held for two months after President Grover Cleveland appointed her interim marshal. However, two months later, Phoebe was replaced by a man.

Couzins served as commissioner for Missouri, on the National Board of Charities and Correction. She was also on the St. Louis World's Fair board of directors. She had written a number of books during her time as Marshal, regarding law and governance. In 1882 President Chester A. Arthur considered her for a position on the Utah Territory Commission.

== Involvement in the suffrage movement ==
During the Civil War, Couzins worked for the Ladies Union Aid Society. It was a society consisting of a considerable number of suffragists, including Annie Turner Wittenmyer and Virginia Minor. Perhaps influenced by this, both Phoebe and Adaline joined the St. Louis Women Suffrage Association. Couzins contributed to "The Revolution", a women's suffrage publication. She served as a delegate to the American Equal Rights Convention in 1871, which was attended by Susan B. Anthony. After the convention, she aligned causes with Anthony and Elizabeth Cady Stanton to form the National Woman Suffrage Association (NWSA) and toured extensively around the country. The Woman Suffrage Association of Missouri merged with the American Woman Suffrage Association (AWSA) in 1871, which caused Couzins to resign from the group, as she favored the radical approach of the NWSA.

After the merge, Couzins was outspoken in her support of the NWSA leadership. She believed that the merge spurred the rise of a new type of suffragist- one who was young and wealthy, and was fighting for suffrage for reasons that opposed her own. She also had a job as secretary of the Board of Lady Managers, but attempted to dominate the meetings, and was fired. She sued for reinstatement, but lost. Prior to her appointment to the Board of Lady Managers, she was a founding member of the Chicago women's group, the Queen Isabella Association.

Phoebe later changed positions and renounced woman suffrage and temperance, which was widely publicized in 1897. At this time Couzins herself was battling health conditions and was becoming increasingly weak. She left the suffrage movement in 1897, and joined the United States Brewers' Association, as a lobbyist against prohibition and temperance. It is assumed that she took up the job because her funds were rapidly dwindling. Her choice was taken as an offence by many suffragists, as temperance was always looked upon favorably by the suffrage movement. She lost her job with the Brewers Association in 1908, when she was about sixty-eight. She then returned to St. Louis, unemployed and disabled. She appealed to the federal government for a job and to the Brewers Association for aid. She solicited friends for help, but was not able to garner enough support.

== Later years and death ==
Couzins died in St. Louis on December 6, 1913, in an unoccupied house at 2722 Pine Street and was mourned by only her brother and a few friends. Her funeral was attended by only six people. She was buried at Bellefontaine Cemetery on December 8, 1913, with her U.S. marshal star pinned to her chest. At her time of death she was in a state of poverty.

== Accolades ==
- In 1950 Couzin's previously unmarked grave received a stone monument, courtesy of the Women's Bar Association of St. Louis.
- In 2000 Susan Frelich Appleton was installed as the inaugural Lemma Barkeloo and Phoebe Couzins Professor of Law at the Washington University School of Law.
