= Iberia Academy and Junior College =

- U.S. National Register of Historic Places
- Location within Missouri Location within the United States
- Location: SR 17 and SR 42, Iberia, Missouri
- Coordinates: 38°5′25″N 92°17′48″W
- Area: 2.5 acres (1.0 ha)
- Built: 1890
- NRHP reference No.: 80002379
- Added to NRHP: September 4, 1980

Iberia Academy and Junior College are historic school buildings located at Iberia, Miller County, Missouri. The four buildings are the dormitory (1905), the administration building (1922–1924), the gymnasium (1927), and "president's home" (1888). The buildings sit at odd angles within a triangle of approximately 2.66 acres. The school was supported mainly by the Congregational church, the academy was known early on as the "Ozark Experiment". The buildings were largely built by student labor. The school closed in 1951.

It was added to the National Register of Historic Places in 1980.
