= Stephen R. Clark =

American judge (born 1966)

Stephen Clark
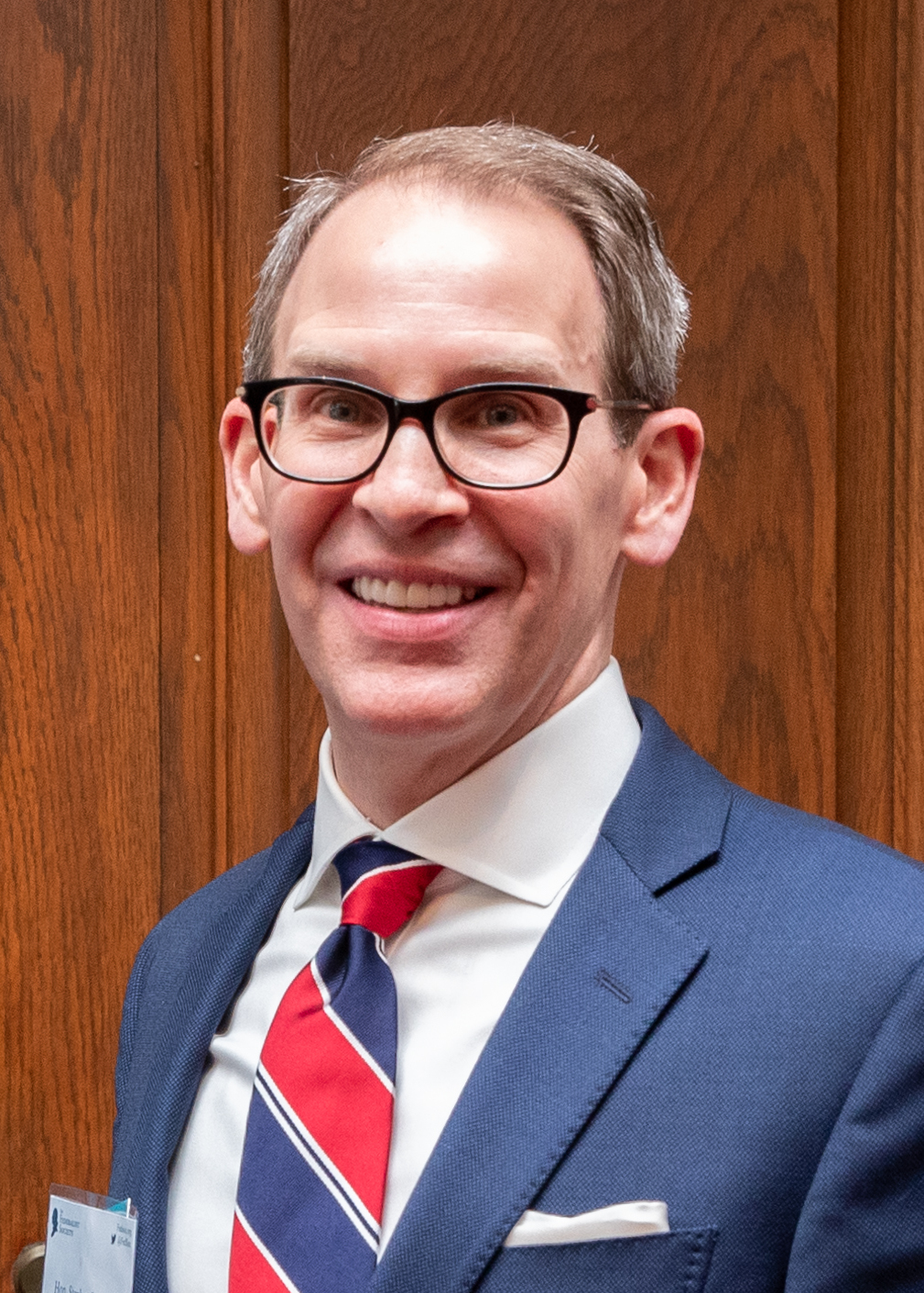

Chief Judge of the United States District Court for the Eastern District of Missouri
- Incumbent
- Assumed office December 16, 2022
- Preceded by: Rodney W. Sippel

Judge of the United States District Court for the Eastern District of Missouri
- Incumbent
- Assumed office June 12, 2019
- Appointed by: Donald Trump
- Preceded by: Carol E. Jackson

Personal details
- Born: Stephen Robert Clark Sr. 1966 (age 59–60) Evanston, Illinois, U.S.
- Party: Republican
- Education: University of Notre Dame (BA); Saint Louis University (JD)

Stephen Robert Clark Sr. (born 1966) is the chief United States district judge of the United States District Court for the Eastern District of Missouri. He is the founder and former managing partner of the St. Louis–based Runnymede Law Group.

== Biography ==
Clark earned his Bachelor of Arts from the University of Notre Dame and his Juris Doctor from Saint Louis University School of Law, where he was a member of the National Moot Court Team.

== Legal career ==
Prior to founding Runnymede in 2008, Clark was an equity partner at Husch Blackwell LLP, an equity shareholder at Polsinelli PC, and an officer at Greensfelder, Hemker & Gale, P.C. Earlier in his practice, he served as a municipal prosecutor, trying over 200 cases. Throughout his career, Clark represented clients pro bono and volunteered for numerous civic and charitable organizations. He also argued appeals in several federal and state appellate courts, including the Eighth and Tenth Circuits and the Supreme Court of Missouri.

== Federal judicial service ==
On April 10, 2018, President Donald Trump announced his intent to nominate Clark to serve as a United States District Judge of the United States District Court for the Eastern District of Missouri. On April 12, 2018, his nomination was sent to the Senate. He was nominated to the seat vacated by Judge Carol E. Jackson, who retired on August 31, 2017. On July 11, 2018, a hearing on his nomination was held before the Senate Judiciary Committee. On September 13, 2018, his nomination was reported out of committee by an 11–10 vote. Democrats opposed his nomination due to Clark's positions on abortion and LGBT rights.

On January 3, 2019, his nomination was returned to the President under Rule XXXI, Paragraph 6 of the United States Senate. On January 23, 2019, President Trump announced his intent to renominate Clark for a federal judgeship. His nomination was sent to the Senate later that day. On February 7, 2019, his nomination was reported out of committee by a 12–10 vote. On May 21, 2019, the Senate invoked cloture on his nomination by a 53–45 vote. On May 22, 2019, his nomination was confirmed by a 53–45 vote. He received his judicial commission on June 12, 2019. He was sworn in on June 14, 2019. He became chief judge on December 16, 2022.

On September 8, 2026, Clark ruled in favor of Republican Bob Onder and two voters in concluding that Missouri must use a 2025 map in the mid-term election. Clark's ruling at the time was in tension with a separate, unanimous ruling from the Missouri Supreme Court, which held the Missouri Secretary of State in contempt for refusing to use a 2022 legislative map for the 2026 midterm. On September 10, 2026, the US Supreme Court temporarily stayed Clark's order pending resolution by the U.S. Court of Appeals for the Eighth Circuit, which affirmed Clark on September 21, 2026. On September 25, 2026, the U.S. Supreme Court again stayed Clark's ruling.

== Memberships ==
He has been a member of the Federalist Society since 2009.

== See also ==
- Donald Trump judicial appointment controversies

Legal offices
Preceded by Carol E. Jackson	Judge of the United States District Court for the Eastern District of Missouri; 2019–present	Incumbent
Preceded by Rodney W. Sippel	Chief Judge of the United States District Court for the Eastern District of Missouri; 2022–present	Incumbent
