= Mary Tiera Farrow =

American lawyer (1880–1971)

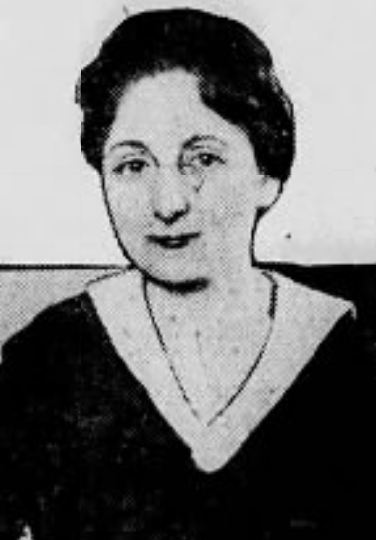
- Farrow, from a 1917 newspaper
- Born: May 27, 1880; Columbus, Indiana, U.S.
- Died: November 9, 1971 (aged 91); Lenexa, Kansas, U.S.
- Education: Kansas City School of Law, 1903; University of Illinois; Columbia University, MA
- Occupation: Lawyer

Mary Tiera Farrow (May 27, 1880 – November 9, 1971) was an American lawyer who co-founded the Women's Bar Association of Kansas City in 1917, was elected treasurer of Kansas City in 1907, and was the first woman to argue a case before the Kansas Supreme Court.

== Early life ==
Farrow was born in Columbus, Indiana, on May 27, 1880, the daughter of Alva Curtis Farrow and Martha Haislup Farrow. Her father owned a general store. In 1855, she moved to Delphos, Kansas, and later attended business school in Kansas City, Missouri. After working as a stenographer, she enrolled at the Kansas City School of Law in 1901, graduating in 1903 as the only woman in her class of 75. Later in life, she earned a degree in sociology at the University of Illinois, and a master's degree from Columbia University. She also studied abroad in Paris, Munich, Petrograd, and Riga.

== Career ==
Farrow was secretary of the stenographers' union in Kansas City as a young woman. She and Anna L. Donahue opened the first woman-owned law firm in Kansas City. She was the first woman lawyer to argue a case before the Kansas Supreme Court. In 1907 she was elected Kansas City treasurer, and she won re-election in 1909. In 1915, she defended her client Clara Theresa Schweiger, who killed her husband at the courthouse after their divorce; Farrow was the first woman lawyer to defend a woman charged with murder. Soon after, she was appointed a "divorce proctor", evaluating divorce suits for the court.

In 1917, Farrow was one of the founding members of the Women's Bar Association of Kansas City. She was also a charter member and president of the Women's State Bar Association of Missouri. During World War I she joined the National League for Women's Service as an ambulance driver in New York City.

In the 1920s Farrow taught introductory legal classes for women. In the 1930s she was national director of Epsilon Sigma Alpha, a professional sorority for journalists, edited the Sorority News, and had a weekly radio program about legal issues. She was the first woman to be seated as a judge on the Kansas City Municipal Court, as a substitute. During World War II she worked with the American Red Cross to provide legal services to the families of servicemen. She retired in 1957, when she was a legal aid counselor at a city welfare office. She wrote a memoir, Lawyer in Petticoats (1953).

== Personal life and legacy ==
At least one younger woman was named "Tiera Farrow" after the noted lawyer. Before and after retirement, Farrow traveled internationally with a friend, accountant Perle Stinson, including a 1911 camping trip together in the Sahara. Farrow died in 1971, at the age of 91, at a nursing home in Lenexa, Kansas. She was inducted into the Starr Women Hall of Fame in 2019. In 2020 she was featured in a coloring book about women's suffrage in Missouri, published by the Kansas City Public Library.
