= David Limbaugh =

American lawyer and political commentator

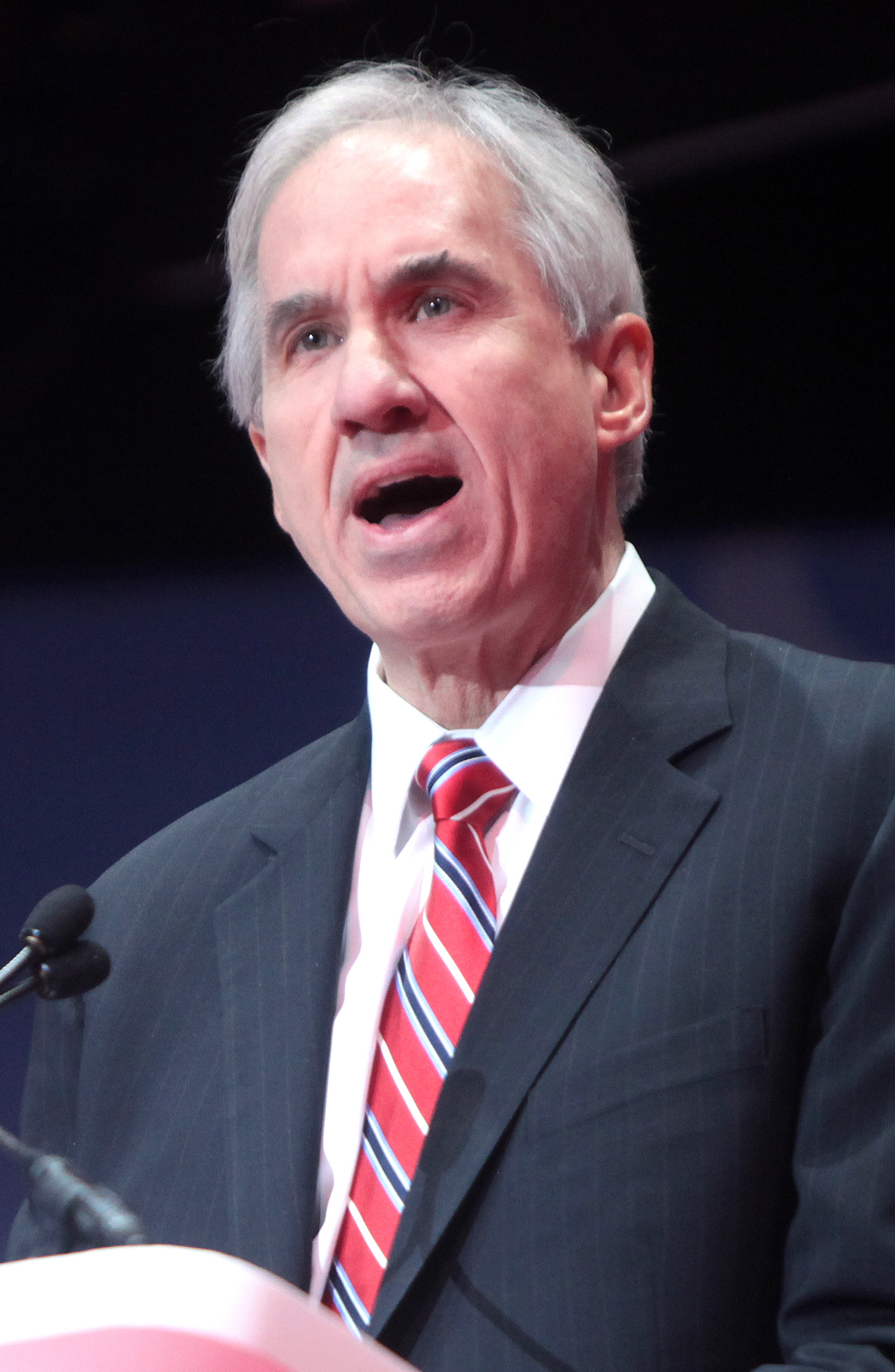
- Limbaugh in 2016
- Born: David Scott Limbaugh; December 11, 1952 (age 73); Cape Girardeau, Missouri, U.S.
- Education: Southeast Missouri State University; University of Missouri (BA, JD)
- Occupations: Attorney, writer
- Relatives: Limbaugh family

David Scott Limbaugh (born December 11, 1952) is a conservative American political commentator and author who has also worked as a professor and as a lawyer. He is the younger brother of talk radio host Rush Limbaugh.

== Life and career ==
Limbaugh was born on December 11, 1952, in Cape Girardeau, Missouri, to Mildred Carolyn "Millie" (née Armstrong) and Rush Hudson Limbaugh Jr. Limbaugh's paternal grandfather was Missouri state representative, lawyer, and United States Ambassador Rush Hudson Limbaugh Sr.

Following high school, Limbaugh attended Southeast Missouri State University in 1971 and 1972, transferring to the University of Missouri, where he graduated cum laude with a bachelor's degree in political science. Limbaugh then went on to law school at Missouri where he received his Juris Doctor (J.D.) from the University of Missouri in 1978. He also served in the National Guard for six years. He has written columns that are carried by Creators Syndicate, Townhall.com, WorldNetDaily and Jewish World Review. In addition to his legal and writing work, Limbaugh also works as an agent for several conservative talk radio hosts.

He currently practices law as a partner at The Limbaugh Firm and specializes in entertainment law.

Limbaugh was chosen by Christian authors Norman Geisler and Frank Turek to write the foreword to their book I Don't Have Enough Faith to Be an Atheist (Crossway, 2004). In the book, Limbaugh states that he became a Christian after years of being a skeptic and that he now has a strong interest in Christian apologetics. Limbaugh describes himself as "an evangelical Christian".

Limbaugh and his wife, Lisa, have five children. Limbaugh has written several books, some of which have been bestsellers, such as Crimes Against Liberty, which was The New York Times' non-fiction best seller for two weeks in 2010.

== Works ==
- Absolute Power: The Legacy of Corruption in the Clinton-Reno Justice Department (Regnery Publishing, March 2001, ISBN 0-89526-237-1)
- Persecution: How Liberals are Waging War Against Christianity (Regnery Publishing, October 2003, ISBN 0-89526-111-1)
- Bankrupt: The Intellectual and Moral Bankruptcy of Today's Democratic Party (Regnery Publishing, September 2006; ISBN 1-59698-017-6)
- Crimes Against Liberty: An Indictment of President Barack Obama (Regnery Publishing, August 2010; ISBN 978-1-59698-624-4)
- The Great Destroyer: Barack Obama's War on the Republic (Regnery Publishing, June 4, 2012; ISBN 978-1596987777)
- Jesus on Trial: A Lawyer Affirms the Truth of the Gospel (Regnery Publishing, September 8, 2014; ISBN 978-1621572558)
- The Emmaus Code: Finding Jesus in the Old Testament (Regnery Publishing, November 9, 2015; ISBN 978-1621574156)
- The True Jesus: Uncovering the Divinity of Christ in the Gospels (Regnery Publishing, April 10, 2017; ISBN 978-1621576372)
- Jesus is Risen: Paul and the Early Church (Regnery Publishing, October 2, 2018; ISBN 978-1621577041)
- Guilty By Reason of Insanity: Why The Democrats Must Not Win (Regnery Publishing, October 29, 2019; ISBN 978-1621579885)
- The Resurrected Jesus: The Church in the New Testament (Regnery Publishing; September 2022; with Christen Limbaugh Bloom; ISBN 978-1621579953)
