= Stephen N. Limbaugh Sr. =

American judge (born 1927)

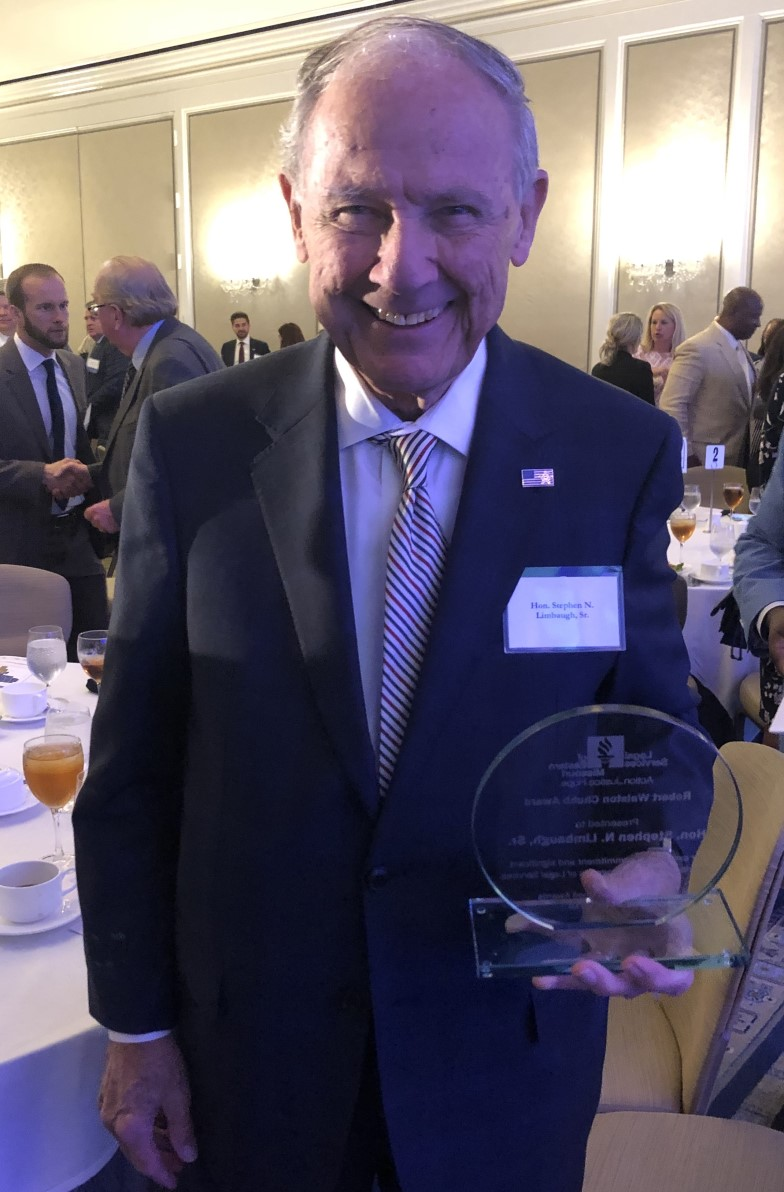

Senior Judge of the United States District Court for the Eastern District of Missouri Senior Judge of the United States District Court for the Western District of Missouri
- In office May 1, 1996 – July 31, 2008

Judge of the United States District Court for the Eastern District of Missouri Judge of the United States District Court for the Western District of Missouri
- In office July 19, 1983 – May 1, 1996
- Appointed by: Ronald Reagan
- Preceded by: Harris Kenneth Wangelin
- Succeeded by: Rodney W. Sippel

Personal details
- Born: Stephen Nathaniel Limbaugh; November 17, 1927 (age 98) Cape Girardeau, Missouri, U.S.
- Children: Stephen N. Limbaugh Jr.
- Parent: Rush Limbaugh Sr. (father)
- Relatives: Limbaugh family
- Education: Southeast Missouri State University (BA); University of Missouri (JD)

Military service
- Branch/service: United States Navy
- Years of service: 1946-1948

Stephen Nathaniel Limbaugh Sr. (born November 17, 1927) is a former United States District Judge who held concurrent appointments to the United States District Court for the Eastern District of Missouri and the United States District Court for the Western District of Missouri from 1983 until his retirement in 2008. He was appointed by president Ronald Reagan in the early 1980s after a distinguished career as a trial lawyer in Missouri. Like his father Rush Limbaugh Sr. before him, Limbaugh served as president of the Missouri Bar from 1982 to his appointment to the bench. His son, Stephen N. Limbaugh Jr., is a federal judge for the Eastern District of Missouri.

== Life and career ==
Limbaugh was born and raised in Cape Girardeau, Missouri, the son of Beulah Maude (Seebaugh) and Rush Hudson Limbaugh. He served in the United States Navy for eighteen months from 1946 to 1948. He earned a B.A. in history from Southeast Missouri State University in 1950 and a J.D. from the University of Missouri School of Law in 1951. He immediately went to work for his father's law firm where he did real estate and title work. From 1955 to 1958, he served as prosecuting attorney for Cape Girardeau County. Subsequently, he was the part-time City attorney of Cape Girardeau, Missouri from 1964 to 1968, while also working in his family law firm, in the same town.

After retirement from the federal bench, Limbaugh went to work as senior counsel for the law firm of Armstrong Teasdale in St. Louis, Missouri. He also worked as a mediator. He is an uncle of radio commentator Rush Limbaugh, who in 2017 described "Uncle Steve" as "the rock of the Limbaugh family", maintaining many of the family's traditions and sharing Rush Sr.'s longevity and vivaciousness even into old age. In 2019, Limbaugh returned to Cape Girardeau and resumed working with the law firm that still bears his father's name.

Limbaugh was awarded the Southeastern Missouri Spirit of America Award in July 2021.

== Federal District Court service ==
On June 7, 1983, through the lobbying of Senator Jack Danforth (who had employed Limbaugh during his campaigns for office), President Reagan nominated Limbaugh to serve as a United States District concurrently on the United States District Court for the Eastern District of Missouri and the United States District Court for the Western District of Missouri, succeeding Judge Kenneth Wangelin. He was confirmed by the Senate on July 18, 1983, and received his commission on July 19, 1983. He took senior status on May 1, 1996, and was succeeded by Rodney W. Sippel. He retired on July 31, 2008 to allow his son Stephen Jr. to serve on the same court (as federal rules prohibit members of the same family from serving on the same court).

=== Selected judicial opinions ===
- National Football League v. McBee & Brunos, 621 F.Supp. 880 (E.D. Mo. 1985), affirmed as modified 792 F.2d 726 (8th Cir. 1986) (copyright satellite interception)
- Peabody Holding Co., Inc. v. Costain Group, PLC, 808 F.Supp. 1425 (E.D. Mo. 1992), 812 F.Supp. 1402 (E.D. Mo. 1993) (contracts Australian coal mines)
- Interactive Digital Software Association v. St. Louis County, 200 F. Supp. 2d 1126 (E.D. Mo. 2002), reversed 329 F.3d 954 (8th Cir. 2003) (video games and free speech protection)
- In Re American Milling Company, 270 F.Supp.2d 1068 (E.D. Mo. 2003), aff'd 409 F.3d 1005 (8th Cir. 2005) (admiralty)
- Washington University v. Catalona, 437 F.Supp2d 985 (E.D. Mo. 2006), aff'd 490 F3d 667 (8th Cir. 2007), cert denied 128 S.Ct. 1122 (2008) (ownership of tissue donated by patients for research)

Legal offices
| Preceded by Harris Kenneth Wangelin | Judge of the United States District Court for the Eastern District of Missouri; Judge of the United States District Court for the Western District of Missouri; 1983–1996 | Succeeded by Rodney W. Sippel |
