= Washington University School of Law =

Private law school in St. Louis, Missouri, US

Coordinates: 38.64968°N 90.31205°W

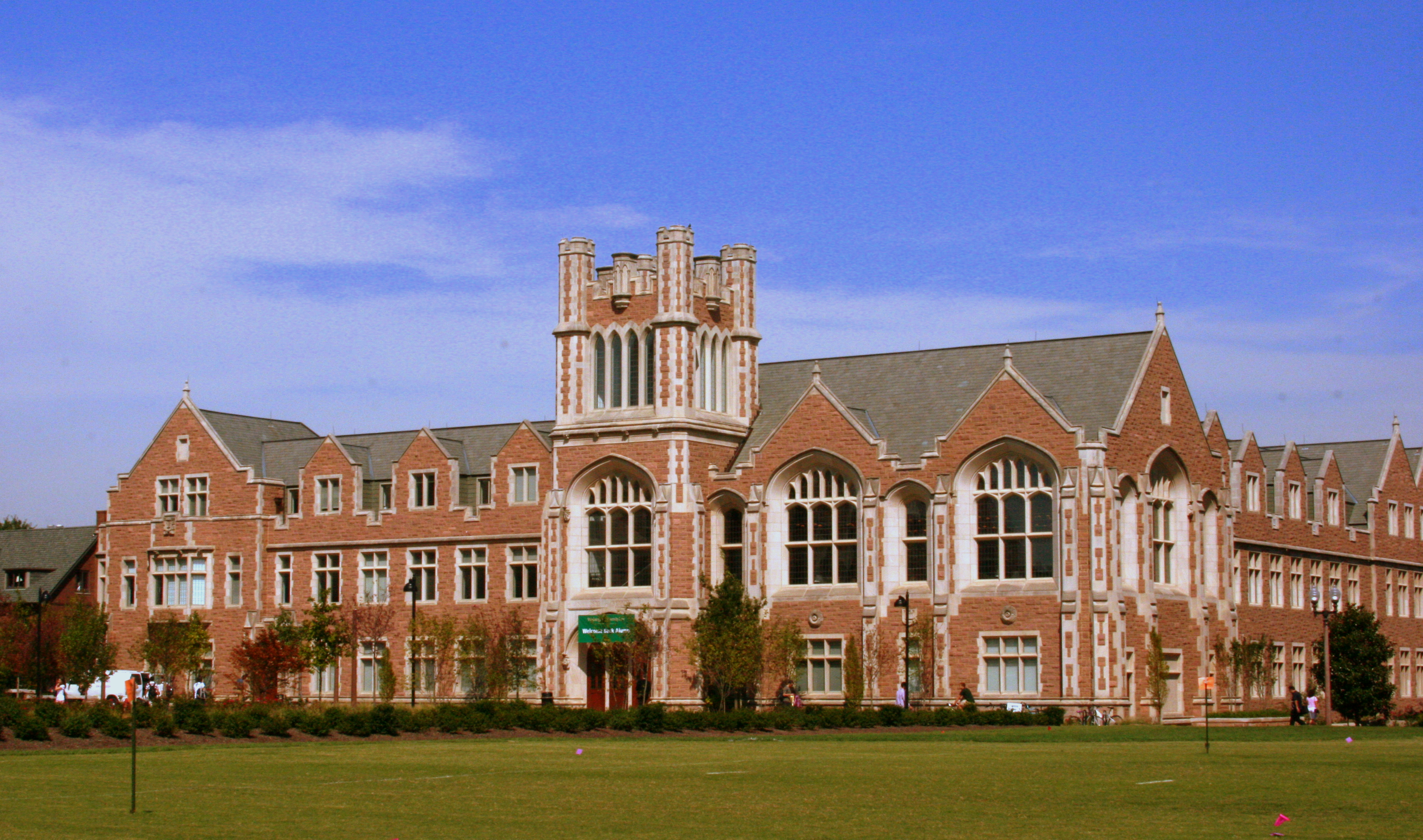
- Anheuser Busch Hall
- Motto: Per Veritatem Vis (Strength Through Truth)
- Parent school: Washington University in St. Louis
- Established: 1867
- School type: Private law school
- Parent endowment: $12 billion
- Dean: Stefanie Lindquist
- Location: St. Louis, Missouri, U.S.
- Enrollment: 718
- Faculty: 136 (full-time), 95 (part-time)
- USNWR ranking: 13th (tie) (2026)
- Bar pass rate: 93.57% (2024 first-time takers)
- Website: law.washu.edu
- ABA profile: Standard 509

The Washington University School of Law (WashU Law) is the law school of Washington University in St. Louis, a private research university in St. Louis, Missouri. Founded in 1867, it is the oldest continuously operating law school west of the Mississippi River.

The school offers JD, LLM, MLS, and JSD degrees, along with a range of dual-degree programs in conjunction with other schools at the university, and graduates around 230 to 250 JD students each year.

== History ==
Founded in 1867, WashU Law is the oldest continuously operating law school west of the Mississippi River (the oldest, Saint Louis University School of Law, operated briefly from 1843-1847 and was reestablished in 1908).

Washington University's law school (originally known as The St. Louis Law School) was the first undergraduate division of the University to admit women and is believed to be among the first U.S. law schools to do so. In 1869, Lemma Barkeloo and Phoebe Couzins enrolled. Barkeloo passed the Missouri bar exam in her first year and did not complete the program, while Couzins earned her LL.B. in 1871, becoming one of the first women in the country to do so. The consistent admission of women did not take place until 17 years later.

The law school was originally located in downtown St. Louis and then relocated in 1904 to the Danforth Campus of Washington University in St. Louis.

In January 1997, the Washington University School of Law moved into Anheuser-Busch Hall. Anheuser-Busch Hall architecturally mirrors the classic style of the Washington University Danforth Campus.

== Admissions ==
For the class entering in fall 2025, there were 258 matriculants. The 25th and 75th LSAT percentiles for the 2025 entering class were 165 and 176, respectively, with a median of 175. The 25th and 75th undergraduate GPA percentiles were 3.58 and 4.00, respectively, with a median of 3.96. The acceptance rate for JD candidates in 2025 was 18.96% and 24.23% of accepted applicants enrolled. Three enrollees were not included in the acceptance rate.

== Employment ==
According to WashU Law's official 2023 ABA-required disclosures, 98.2% of 2023 graduates had secured full-time employment within nine months of graduation. A total of 63.7% had found employment in firms of more than 250 lawyers or had secured federal judicial clerkships.

According to U.S. News & World Report, the median starting salary for WashU Law's Class of 2023 graduates in the private sector was $205,000.

== Journals ==
The Washington University School of Law sponsors four student-run scholarly legal journals.

- Washington University Law Review began as the St. Louis Law Review in 1915 and was re-titled the Washington University Law Quarterly in 1936.
- Washington University Journal of Law and Policy originated in 1968 as the Urban Law Annual and focused entirely on issues surrounding land use, urban development, and other legal concerns of urban communities.
- Washington University Global Studies Law Review is a student-edited international legal journal dedicated to publishing articles by international, foreign, and comparative law scholars.
- Washington University Jurisprudence Review was formed in 2008 and is the only student-edited, in-print journal of law and philosophy.

== Rankings and honors ==
The 2026 edition of U.S. News & World Report Best Grad Schools ranked WashU Law:

- tied for #13 overall

Law School Specialty Rankings:

- tied for #25 in Business/Corporate Law
- tied for #8 in Clinical Training
- tied for #19 in Constitutional Law
- tied for #22 in Contracts/Commercial Law
- tied for #18 in Criminal Law
- tied for #32 in Dispute Resolution
- tied for #73 in Environmental Law
- tied for #24 in Health Care Law
- tied for #31 in Intellectual Property Law
- tied for #24 in International Law
- tied for #20 in Law Schools with the Most Graduates at Big Law Firms
- tied for #9 in Law Schools with the Most Graduates in Federal Clerkships
- tied for #27 in Tax Law
- tied for #31 in Trial Advocacy

The 2022 edition of The Princeton Review Best Law Schools ranked WashU Law:

- 6th in Best for Federal Clerkships

Leiter's Law School Rankings placed the law school:

- 10th in where elite litigation boutiques hire

The Above the Law 2022 law school rankings ranked WashU Law:

- 6th in the country overall

== Degree programs ==
=== Juris doctor program ===
JD students are required to take 86 semester hours of credit in order to graduate. In the first year of law school all students are required to take one semester each of Contracts, Property, Torts, Civil Procedure, Constitutional Law, and Criminal Law. Additionally, in fall of their first year all students are required to take Legal Practice I and Legal Research Methodologies I, and in spring of their first year students are required to take Legal Practice II and Legal Research Methodologies II. The second and third year offer more flexibility in planning the student's curriculum as there are only two mandatory classes (a class from the ethics curriculum and one seminar).

=== Joint degree programs ===
The School of Law offers five joint degree programs (usually completed in four years):

JD-MBA, with the Washington University in St. Louis Olin Business School
JD-MA in East Asian Studies, with the Washington University School of Arts and Sciences
JD-MA in Economics, with the Washington University School of Arts and Sciences
JD-MHA in Health Administration, with the Washington University School of Medicine
JD-MSW, with the Washington University in St. Louis George Warren Brown School of Social Work
JD-LLM, with the University of Queensland

=== Master of Laws program ===
The Washington University School of Law offers an LL.M. in U.S. Law for international students, an LL.M. in Negotiation and Dispute Resolution, an LL.M. in Intellectual Property & Technology Law, and an LL.M. in Taxation. An Online Master of Laws in U.S. Law program and an Online Master of Legal Studies program are also available. The school also offers a Dual LL.M. Degree with the Tecnológico de Monterrey's Escuela de Gobierno y Transformación Pública in Mexico.

=== Master of legal studies program ===
This program is a graduate program designed for non-lawyers.

=== Juris scientiae doctoris program ===
The JSD program emphasizes original research and writing culminating in the preparation of a significant and extensive dissertation of publishable quality.

=== Online law programs ===
In January 2013, the Washington University School of Law started to offer an online LL.M. in U.S. Law degree for international students. The school also offers an online Master of Legal Studies degree and a dual LL.M. degree.

Online program in taxation

The Washington University School of Law offers an online LL.M. degree in Taxation for U.S. candidates who already possess a J.D. degree, and for foreign lawyers.

==== Online program ====
The Master of Laws in U.S. Law program at the Washington University School of Law is an online degree offering meant for international lawyers. The LL.M. curriculum consists of live online classes with weekly coursework.

==== Online master of legal studies program ====
The curriculum focuses on appropriate legal procedure with regard to contracts, intellectual property, business associations, negotiation, immigration law, and cyber security.

== Washington University School of Law legal clinics ==
- Appellate Clinic
- Civil Rights and Mediation Clinic
- Criminal Justice Clinic
- Entrepreneurship & Intellectual Property Clinic
- First Amendment Clinic
- Immigration Clinic
- Interdisciplinary Environmental Clinic
- Low Income Taxpayer Clinic
- Post-Conviction Relief Clinical Practicum
- Prosecution Law Clinic
- Veterans Law Clinic
- Wrongful Conviction Clinic

== Research centers and institutes ==
- Center for Empirical Research in the Law - focuses on applying sophisticated empirical methodology to legal studies research.
- Center for Research on Innovation and Entrepreneurship - provides law students with the ability to work with intellectual property counsel and provide legal advice to both the University and the wider community. Law students collaborate with students from the School of Medicine, Olin School of Business, the Department of Biomedical Engineering, the George Warren Brown School of Social Work, and Arts & Sciences.
- Whitney R. Harris World Law Institute - focuses as a center for instruction and research in international and comparative law to prepare students for a global society.

== Notable alumni ==
=== Academia ===
- Francis J. Beckwith (MJS 2001): philosopher, professor of philosophy and church-state studies at Baylor University
- Bruce Ovbiagele (MLS 2021): professor of neurology and associate dean at the University of California, San Francisco; chief of staff at the San Francisco VA Medical Center,

=== Business ===
- Eric P. Newman (JD 1935): numismatist, author, and vice president of by Edison Brothers Stores

=== Government ===
- Carl J. Artman (JD): Assistant Secretary of the Interior for Indian Affairs, and head of the Bureau of Indian Affairs 2007–08
- David Bohigian, Assistant Secretary of Commerce from 2005 to 2009 under George W. Bush
- Phoebe Couzins (LLB 1871): first female U.S. Marshal; feminist; leader in the women's suffrage movement
- Andrew G. McCabe (JD 1993): 16th deputy director of the FBI
- William H. Webster (JD 1949): 14th director of the CIA and the 6th director of the FBI
- Andrew Wheeler (JD): 15th administrator of the United States Environmental Protection Agency under Donald Trump

=== Law ===
- Edward Coke Crow (LLB 1879): 23rd Attorney General of Missouri, 1897–1905, advisor to Missouri Governor Lloyd Crow Stark (1937–1941)
- Jonathan Kanter (JD): Assistant Attorney General, United States Department of Justice Antitrust Division
- Luther Ely Smith (JD 1897): lawyer credited with founding Gateway Arch National Park

=== Politics ===
- Henry S. Caulfield (JD 1895): 37th Governor of Missouri, 1929–1933; United States Representative for Missouri's 11th congressional district
- Clark M. Clifford (LLB 1928): U.S. Secretary of Defense, 1968–69; presidential advisor
- Earl Thomas Coleman (JD 1969): U.S. congressman from Missouri, 1977–1993
- Dwight F. Davis (LLB): founder of Davis Cup, and 49th US Secretary of War
- Alan J. Dixon (LLB 1949): U.S. Senator from Illinois, 1981–93
- Leonidas C. Dyer (JD 1893): U.S. congressman from Missouri, 1915–1933
- Aubrey B. Hamilton (JD 1939), Missouri House of Represetnatives
- Harry B. Hawes (JD 1896): U.S. Senator from Missouri, 1926–1933
- Thomas C. Hennings Jr. (JD 1926): U.S. Senator from Missouri, 1951–1960
- William L. Igoe (JD 1902): U.S. congressman from Missouri, 1913–1921
- Alphonso Jackson (JD 1972): U.S. Secretary of Housing and Urban Development, 2004–2008
- Victor J. Miller (JD): mayor of St. Louis, 1925-1933
- Roscoe C. Patterson (JD 1897): U.S. Senator from Missouri, 1929–1935
- Kenneth J. Rothman (AB, JD): Lieutenant Governor of Missouri, 1981–1985
- Steven Rothman (JD 1977): US Congressman from New Jersey, 1997–2013
- Phyllis Schlafly (AB 1944, JD 1978): antifeminist activist and founder of Eagle Forum
- Brian W. Shukan (JD 1994): United States Ambassador to Benin, 2022-Present
- Ralph Tyler Smith (JD 1940): U.S. Senator from Illinois, 1969–1970
- Selden P. Spencer (JD 1886): U.S. Senator from Missouri, 1918–1925
- Louis Susman (JD): United States Ambassador to Great Britain, 2009-2013
- Xenophon P. Wilfley (JD 1899): U.S. Senator from Missouri, 1918
- George Howard Williams (JD 1897): U.S. Senator from Missouri, 1925–1926

=== Judiciary ===
- Robert E. Bacharach (JD 1985): current judge, United States Court of Appeals for the Tenth Circuit
- David Bernhard (JD 1985): current judge, Court of Appeals of Virginia
- Michael Cherry (JD 1969): chief justice, Supreme Court of Nevada, 2017-2018
- Stephanie D. Davis (JD 1992): current judge, United States Court of Appeals for the Sixth Circuit
- Audrey G. Fleissig (JD 1980): current judge, United States District Court for the Eastern District of Missouri
- Raymond Gruender (JD/MBA 1987): current judge, United States Court of Appeals for the Eighth Circuit
- Jean Constance Hamilton (JD 1971): current judge, United States District Court for the Eastern District of Missouri
- Andrew Jackson Higgins (JD 1948): former judge, former chief justice, Supreme Court of Missouri
- John Francis Nangle (JD 1948): former chief judge, United States District Court for the Eastern District of Missouri, 1983–1990
- Catherine D. Perry (JD 1980): current judge, United States District Court for the Eastern District of Missouri
- Rodney W. Sippel (JD 1981): current judge, United States District Court for the Eastern District of Missouri
- Richard B. Teitelman (JD 1973): former judge, former chief justice, Supreme Court of Missouri
