= New York State Executive Mansion =

United States historic place, residence of the governor of New York

- U.S. National Register of Historic Places
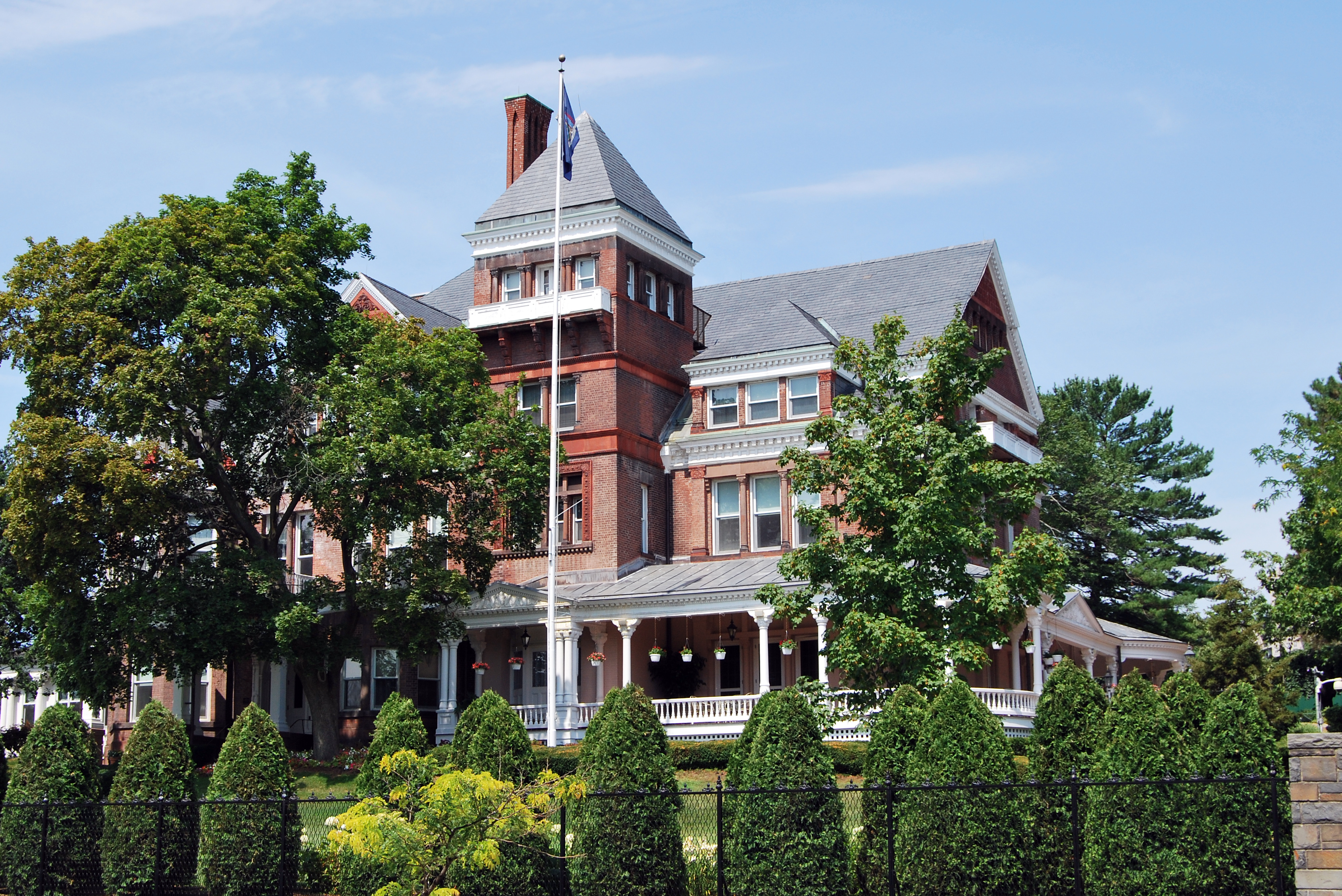
- East facade in 2011

- Location within New York Location within the United States
- Interactive map showing the location for New York State Executive Mansion
- Location: 138 Eagle Street; Albany, New York
- Coordinates: 42°38′48″N 73°45′41″W
- Area: 9.9 acres (4.0 ha)
- Built: 1856
- Architectural style: Queen Anne (previously Italianate)
- Website: Official website
- NRHP reference No.: 71000518
- Added to NRHP: February 18, 1971

The New York State Executive Mansion is the official residence of the governor of New York. Located at 138 Eagle Street in Albany, New York, it has housed governors and their families since 1875.

== History ==
The building was constructed in 1856 as a private home in the Italianate style for banker Thomas Olcott. During the 1860s, the residence was extensively remodeled by Robert L. Johnson, its second owner. Samuel Tilden became the first governor to reside in the house when he rented it in 1875, and the state purchased it two years later.

In 1960 Governor Nelson Rockefeller installed a fallout shelter. After a fire in 1961, the possibility of building or purchasing a modern mansion uptown was considered, but Rockefeller fought for restoration and was instrumental in getting the mansion named to the National Register of Historic Places. In the early 1980s, the Executive Mansion Preservation Society was established to coordinate restoration of the home. Inmates from state prisons once staffed the mansion.

Over the years, various governors have altered the mansion. Theodore Roosevelt, for example, had a gymnasium constructed during his stay. Franklin D. Roosevelt installed a swimming pool in 1932. It was subsequently filled in when its building was converted into a greenhouse, but Mario Cuomo had the pool restored during his tenure. Al Smith had a zoo built, and Nelson Rockefeller added the mansion's tennis courts. Twenty-nine consecutive governors had used the building on a mostly full-time basis until Governor George Pataki.

Former Governor Andrew Cuomo (who previously maintained his principal residence at the Lily Pond estate in New Castle, New York, with former partner Sandra Lee) began to live in the mansion during the autumn of 2019. During the COVID-19 pandemic, his three daughters quarantined at the residence. Governor Kathy Hochul and her husband William Hochul currently reside in the mansion along with her daughter Caitlin and her partner.

=== Green certification ===
In April 2009, Michelle Paige Paterson, wife of Governor David Paterson, announced that as a result of efforts to "green" the operations and maintenance of the building and grounds, the mansion had earned a Leadership in Energy and Environmental Design (LEED) Gold certification from the US Green Building Council. The mansion is the first governor's residence in the country to earn Gold status using the LEED for Existing Buildings (LEED-EB) rating system. The project encompassed almost two years and was initiated by previous First Lady Silda Wall Spitzer.

Free guided tours of the Executive Mansion were once offered but have been suspended.

== See also ==
- New York State Capitol
- Paterson, David. Black, Blind, & In Charge: A Story of Visionary Leadership and Overcoming Adversity. Skyhorse Publishing. New York, New York, 2020.
