= First ladies and gentlemen of New York =

Spouse or Partner of the Governor of New York

First Gentleman of New York
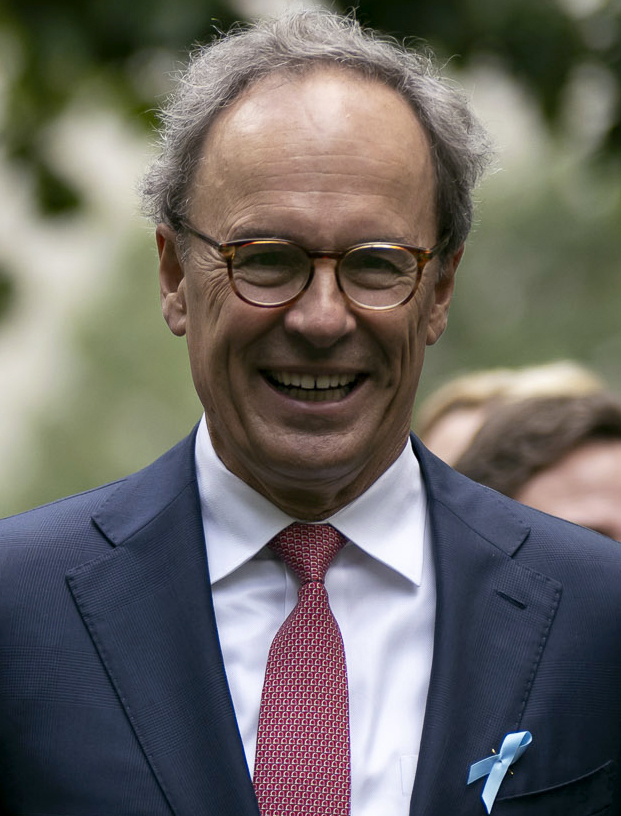
- Incumbent; Bill Hochul since August 24, 2021
- Style: First Lady; First Gentleman
- Residence: New York Executive Mansion
- Inaugural holder: Cornelia Clinton
- Formation: 1777

The first ladies and gentlemen of New York is the title held by the host or hostess of the New York Executive Mansion, usually the spouse or partner of the governor of New York, concurrent with the governor's term in office. The inaugural first lady of New York was Cornelia Clinton (née Tappen), the wife of the first governor of New York, George Clinton.

== List ==
The following is an incomplete list of first ladies and gentlemen of New York.

Gov. No.	Image	Name	Tenure	Governor
1		Cornelia Clinton (1744–1800)	July 30, 1777 – June 30, 1795	George Clinton m. 1770
2		Sarah Livingston Jay (1756–1802)	July 1, 1795 – June 30, 1801	John Jay m. 1774
1	Vacant: July 1, 1801 – June 30, 1804			George Clinton; Widower
3		Gertrude Lewis (1757–1833)	July 1, 1804 – June 30, 1807	Morgan Lewis m. 1779
4		Hannah Tompkins (1781–1829)	July 1, 1807 – February 24, 1817	Daniel D. Tompkins m. 1798
5	Vacant: February 24, 1817 – June 30, 1817			John Tayler; Widower
6		Maria Clinton (1775–1818)	July 1, 1817 – July 30, 1818	DeWitt Clinton m. 1796
6	Vacant: July 30 – April 21, 1819			DeWitt Clinton; Widower
6		Catharine Clinton (1783–1855)	April 21, 1819 – December 31, 1822	DeWitt Clinton m. 1819
7	Vacant: January 1, 1823 – December 31, 1824			Joseph C. Yates
6		Catharine Clinton (1783–1855)	January 1, 1825 – February 11, 1828	DeWitt Clinton m. 1819
8	Vacant: February 11 – December 31, 1828			Nathaniel Pitcher; Widower
9	Vacant: January 1 – March 12, 1829			Martin Van Buren; Widower
10		Evelina Throop (1794–1834)	March 12, 1829 – December 31, 1832	Enos T. Throop m. 1814
11		Cornelia Marcy (1803–1889)	January 1, 1833 – December 31, 1838	William L. Marcy m. 1824
12		Frances Adeline Seward (1805–1865)	January 1, 1839 – December 31, 1842	William H. Seward m. 1824
13		Catherine Bouck (1787–1861)	January 1, 1843 – December 31, 1844	William C. Bouck m. 1807
14		Clarissa Moody Wright (1804–1870)	January 1, 1845 – December 31, 1846	Silas Wright m. 1833
15		Ellen Young (1812–1872)	January 1, 1847 – December 31, 1848	John Young m. 1833
16		Julia Fish (1816–1887)	January 1, 1849 – December 31, 1850	Hamilton Fish m. 1836
17		Mary Walbridge Hunt (1815–1905)	January 1, 1851 – December 31, 1852	Washington Hunt m. 1834
18		Mary Bleecker Seymour (1812–1886)	January 1, 1853 – December 31, 1854	Horatio Seymour m. 1835
19		Zilpha Clark (1806–1877)	January 1, 1855 – December 31, 1856	Myron H. Clark m. 1830
20		Mary King (1790–1873)	January 1, 1857 – December 31, 1858	John A. King m. 1810
21		Elizabeth Matilda Morgan (1810–1885)	January 1, 1859 – December 31, 1862	Edwin D. Morgan m. 1833
18		Mary Bleecker Seymour (1812–1886)	January 1, 1863 – January 1, 1865	Horatio Seymour m. 1835
22		Elizabeth Fenton (1824–1901)	January 2, 1865 – December 31, 1868	Reuben Fenton m. 1844
23		Ella Hoffman (1833–1892)	January 1, 1869 – December 31, 1872	John T. Hoffman m. 1854
24		Catherine Dix (1802–1884)	January 1, 1873 – December 31, 1874	John Adams Dix m. 1826
25	Vacant: January 1, 1875 – December 31, 1876			Samuel J. Tilden; Unmarried
26	Vacant: January 1, 1877 – December 31, 1879			Lucius Robinson; Widower
27		Ellen Augusta Cornell (1834–1893)	January 1, 1880 – December 31, 1882	Alonzo B. Cornell m. 1852
28	Vacant: January 1, 1883 – January 6, 1885			Grover Cleveland; Unmarried
29	Vacant: January 6, 1885 – December 31, 1891			David B. Hill; Unmarried
30		Sarah M. Flower (1836–1910)	January 1, 1892 – December 31, 1894	Roswell P. Flower m. 1859
31		Anna Morton (1846–1918)	January 1, 1895 – December 31, 1896	Levi P. Morton m. 1873
32		Lois B. Black (1858–1931)	January 1, 1897 – December 31, 1898	Frank S. Black m. 1879
33		Edith Roosevelt (1861–1948)	January 1, 1899 – December 31, 1900	Theodore Roosevelt m. 1886
34		Linda Odell (1858–1940)	January 1, 1901 – December 31, 1904	Benjamin Odell m. 1891
35		Kate Higgins (1855–1929)	January 1, 1905 – December 31, 1906	Frank W. Higgins m. 1877
36		Antoinette Carter Hughes (1864–1945)	January 1, 1907 – October 6, 1910	Charles Evans Hughes m. 1888
37		Jane White (1863–1937)	October 6, 1910 – December 31, 1910	Horace White m. 1903
38		Gertrude Alden Dix (1860–1923)	January 1, 1911 – December 31, 1912	John Alden Dix m. 1889
39		Clara Sulzer (1868–1948)	January 1, 1913 – October 17, 1913	William Sulzer m. 1908
40		Mary Glynn (1878–1948)	October 17, 1913 – December 31, 1914	Martin H. Glynn m. 1901
41		Olive Whitman (1880–1928)	January 1, 1915 – December 31, 1918	Charles Seymour Whitman m. 1908
42		Catherine Smith (1875–1944)	January 1, 1919 – December 31, 1920	Al Smith m. 1900
43		Elizabeth Miller (1870–1959)	January 1, 1921 – December 31, 1922	Nathan L. Miller m. 1896
42		Catherine Smith (1875–1944)	January 1, 1923 – December 31, 1928	Al Smith m. 1900
44		Eleanor Roosevelt (1884–1962)	January 1, 1929 – December 31, 1932	Franklin D. Roosevelt m. 1905
45		Edith Lehman (1899–1976)	January 1, 1933 – December 2, 1942	Herbert H. Lehman m. 1910
46		Jean Poletti (1904–1974)	December 2, 1942 – December 31, 1942	Charles Poletti m. 1934
47		Frances Dewey (1903–1970)	January 1, 1943 – December 31, 1954	Thomas E. Dewey m. 1928
48		Marie Norton Harriman (1903–1970)	January 1, 1955 – December 31, 1958	W. Averell Harriman m. 1930
49		Mary Rockefeller (1907–1999)	January 1, 1959 – March 16, 1962	Nelson Rockefeller m. 1930; div. 1962
49	Vacant: March 16, 1962 – May 4, 1963			Nelson Rockefeller; Unmarried
49		Happy Rockefeller (1926–2015)	May 4, 1963 – December 18, 1973	Nelson Rockefeller m. 1963
50		Katherine McCloskey Wilson (1914–1980)	December 18, 1973 – December 31, 1974	Malcolm Wilson m. 1941
51	Vacant: January 1, 1975 – April 11, 1981			Hugh Carey; Widower
51		Evangeline Gouletas (b. 1936)	April 11, 1981 – December 31, 1982	Hugh Carey m. 1981; div. 1989
52		Matilda Cuomo (b. 1931)	January 1, 1983 – December 31, 1994	Mario Cuomo m. 1954
53		Libby Pataki (b. 1950)	January 1, 1995 – December 31, 2006	George Pataki m. 1973
54		Silda Wall Spitzer (b. 1957)	January 1, 2007 – March 17, 2008	Eliot Spitzer m. 1987; div. 2013
55		Michelle Paige Paterson (b. 1961)	March 17, 2008 – December 31, 2010	David Paterson m. 1993; div. 2014
56		Sandra Lee (b. 1966)	January 1, 2011 – September 25, 2019	Andrew Cuomo; Domestic partner
56	Vacant: September 25, 2019 – August 23, 2021			Andrew Cuomo; Unmarried
57		William J. Hochul Jr. (b. 1959)	August 24, 2021 – Current	Kathy Hochul m. 1984

== See also ==
- Governor of New York
- List of governors of New York
