= James Breeden =

American priest and civil rights activist (1934–2020)

The Reverend James P. Breeden
- Mugshot taken after Breeden's arrest in Jackson, Mississippi (1961)
- Born: October 14, 1934; Minneapolis, Minnesota, U.S.
- Died: September 20, 2020 (aged 85); Easthampton, Massachusetts, U.S.
- Education: Dartmouth College (BA); Union Theological Seminary (MDiv); Harvard University (EdD)
- Occupations: Episcopal priest; Associate professor
- Known for: Freedom Rider
- Movement: Civil rights
- Spouse: Jeanne Marie Savoye (m. 1958)

James Pleasant Breeden (October 14, 1934 – September 20, 2020) was an American civil rights activist, Freedom Rider and Episcopal priest. In 1961 he was arrested along with 14 other Freedom Riders in Jackson, Mississippi for entering a segregated restaurant at a bus station. He later took part in the establishment of Freedom Schools during the "Stay Out for Freedom" movement in Boston, Massachusetts.

== Early life and education ==
James Pleasant Breeden was born in Minneapolis, Minnesota on October 14, 1934, as the only child of Florence Beatrice Thomas and Pleasant George Breeden. His mother worked as a secretary and his father was a railroad dining car waiter. James was raised by his mother and his stepfather, Noah Smith. In his youth, James was a Boy Scout who reached the rank of Eagle Scout. He attended Harrison Elementary School and Lincoln Junior High School, and graduated from North High School in 1952 as class salutatorian.

James Breeden graduated cum laude with a Bachelor of Arts degree from Dartmouth College in 1956, where he was also a member of the Casque and Gauntlet senior society. During his time at Dartmouth, Breeden and the two other African-American men in his class were assigned a mandatory living situation together in the only room at the top of Topliff Hall, where they would often find racist notes left outside their door. Breeden said that they "didn't even consider protesting" because "We just accepted it as what one would expect at an institution like Dartmouth". Breeden was part of the debate team, but was asked to sit out of the national debate tournament which was held at the segregated Johns Hopkins University. He also attended a lecture by Thurgood Marshall who visited the campus as part of the "Great Issues" lecture series.

In 1959, Breeden received a certificate from the University of Geneva for his work at the Bossey Ecumenical Institute of the World Council of Churches in Switzerland, and in 1960 he graduated from Union Theological Seminary in New York with a Master of Divinity degree. Breeden was ordained as a priest in the Episcopal Church after moving to Boston the same year. He was a member of the episcopal diocese of Massachusetts, acting as a deacon, priest and canon until 1965. From 1961 until 1963 he was curate at St. John and St. James in Roxbury, and from 1963 until 1965 he was an advisor on civil rights to Bishop Anson Phelps Stokes, while also serving the Cathedral Church of St. Paul in Boston. He was Director of the Commission on Church and Race of the Massachusetts Council of Churches from 1967 until 1969.

In 1969, Breeden became an associate professor of the social policy program at Harvard Graduate School of Education, where he received his doctorate in education (EdD) in 1972. While on a sabbatical the next year, he helped to establish a master's degree program in education administration at the University of Dar es Salaam in Tanzania. He was an associate professor at the University of Massachusetts from 1976 to 1978, and from 1978 to 1982 he was a senior officer in the Office of Planning and Policy in Boston Public Schools. In 1982 he became director of the Center for Law and Education in Cambridge, Massachusetts. He was Dean of the Tucker Foundation at Dartmouth College from 1984 until 1995, where he found the campus "radically changed" from his time as a student there. From 1994, Breeden was a visiting scholar of the Howard Graduate School of Education. He became a member of faculty at the School for International Training in 2001.

== Freedom Rider ==
After his ordination in 1960, Breeden joined a group of Episcopalians who wanted to assert the church's role in the civil rights movement, and it was through this group that he became a Freedom Rider. The Freedom Riders took buses into the south in order to test the 1960 Supreme Court ruling in Boynton v. Virginia which outlawed segregation in interstate commerce. However, the Interstate Commerce Commission failed to enforce the ruling, meaning that Freedom Riders were often subject to racist violence and arrests by police enforcing segregation.

On September 13, 1961, James Breeden was arrested along with 14 other black and white clergymen who had entered a segregated restaurant at a Trailways bus terminal in Jackson, Mississippi, while travelling on the "Prayer Pilgrimage Freedom Ride" from New Orleans to their intended final destination in Detroit. Breeden later said that "We knew what would happen when we went in and didn’t leave when ordered to, which is exactly what occurred." Breeden and the other Freedom Riders were charged with "action likely to cause a riot", which allowed police to work around the illegality of local Jim Crow laws. Breeden and the other freedom riders were held in a segregated jail in Jackson for 6 days before the charges against them were dismissed. Breeden and fellow rider Robert Laughlin Pierson later brought a federal lawsuit against the Jackson chief of police and the presiding judge, charging the two with denying them their civil rights. In 1967 the decision was partially upheld in Pierson v. Ray, which resulted in an eight-year period of civil rights protests led by Breeden in the Boston area.

Breeden was an Episcopal priest at St. James Church in Boston, Massachusetts when he was arrested for his participation in the Prayer Pilgrimage Freedom Ride in 1961.

== Other activism ==
Breeden and social worker Noel Day set up "Citizens for Human Rights", which helped organize Boston's first "Stay Out for Freedom" day in June 1963, where Black students would attend "Freedom Schools" instead of Boston's public schools in order to protest against the city's poor quality schooling for Black students. James and his wife Jeanne helped write the Freedom Schools curriculum, and James emphasised that his support for the school boycotts "does not mean we are neglecting our children’s education", but rather "On the contrary, we are trying to give our children more of the education we think they should have." In February 1964, a few days before the second school boycott day which state officials had said would be illegal, he spoke at a law school forum where he said that "It is sometimes necessary to break a law to achieve justice". Up to 10,000 people participated in the school boycotts, and Breeden was instrumental in gaining support from white liberals. After the second boycott Breeden declared that "We have a freedom movement in Boston at last". In the late 1960s, Breeden helped set up the Highland Park Free School in Boston.

Breeden was also involved in other protest movements, including rent strikes in 1964 to protest against landlords exploiting tenants. In the following year he joined the activist leadership of the National Council of Churches, where he helped organize non-violent protests for two years. He also worked with the Episcopal Society for Racial and Cultural Unity (ESCRU) to fight racial discrimination within the Episcopal Church, and during time as executive director of the Citywide Coordinating Council in Boston, which he joined in 1976, he was heavily involved in the struggle to desegregate schools in the city.

Breeden was also active in the Anti-apartheid movement. In December 1984, James Breeden was arrested along with Democratic representative Harold Ford Sr. while protesting against apartheid outside the South African Embassy. Breeden and Ford were charged with a misdemeanor for demonstrating within 500 feet of an embassy.

== Personal life and death ==
James Breeden married Jeanne Marie Savoye in 1958 in Geneva, Switzerland. They first met as undergraduates while Jeanne was attending Middlebury College, and they attended a student Christian conference in Boston where she was impressed by Breeden's speech. They were also students together at Union Theological Seminary, and they planned James's activism together.

James and Jeanne lived for a time in Leyden, Massachusetts. James Pleasant Breeden died from cancer at the age of 85 in his home in Easthampton, Massachusetts on September 20, 2020. He was survived by his wife Jeanne, his daughters Margaret and Johanna, his sons Frederick and Paul, and three grandchildren.
