= Trini E. Ross =

American attorney (born 1966)

Trini Ross
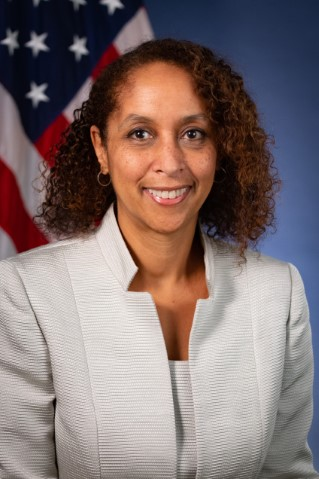

United States Attorney for the Western District of New York
- In office October 11, 2021 – February 17, 2025
- President: Joe Biden; Donald Trump
- Preceded by: James P. Kennedy Jr.
- Succeeded by: Joel L. Violanti (acting)

Personal details
- Born: April 24, 1966 (age 60) Buffalo, New York, U.S.
- Education: State University of New York at Fredonia (BA); Rutgers University (MA); University at Buffalo (JD)

Trini Elana Ross (born April 24, 1966) is an American attorney who served as the first African-American woman United States attorney for the Western District of New York from 2021 to 2025.

== Early life and education ==
Ross was born and raised in Buffalo, New York. She earned a Bachelor of Arts degree from the State University of New York at Fredonia in 1988, a Master of Arts from Rutgers University in 1990, and a Juris Doctor from the University at Buffalo Law School in 1992.

== Career ==
Ross began her career as an appellate attorney for the New York Supreme Court. She was an associate at Hiscock & Barclay, LLC before joining the Office of Professional Responsibility as assistant counsel. From 1995 to 2018, Ross served as an assistant United States attorney for the Western District of New York. She has also been an adjunct professor of law at Buffalo Law School. She has also served as director of the investigations for the National Science Foundation Office of Inspector General since 2018.

=== United States attorney ===
On July 26, 2021, President Joe Biden nominated Ross to be the United States attorney for the Western District of New York. On September 23, 2021, her nomination was reported out of committee. On September 30, 2021, her nomination was confirmed in the United States Senate by voice vote. She was sworn into office on October 11, 2021.
