= Allison Pataki =

American novelist

- Born: November 25, 1984 (age 41); New York, U.S.
- Education: Yale University
- Occupation: Writer
- Spouse: David Levy (m. 2012)
- Parent(s): George Pataki; Libby Pataki
- Writing career
- Language: English
- Genre: Historical fiction
- Website: allisonpataki.com

Allison Pataki (born November 25, 1984) is an American author and journalist. Her six historical novels are The Magnificent Lives of Marjorie Post; The Traitor's Wife: The Woman Behind Benedict Arnold and the Plan to Betray America; The Accidental Empress; Sisi, Empress on Her Own; Where the Light Falls; and The Queen's Fortune. Beauty in the Broken Places is her first memoir.

== Biography ==
Pataki was born in New York, and is the daughter of former New York State Governor and 2016 presidential candidate, George Pataki and his wife Libby (née Rowland). Allison attended Yale University, where she majored in English. She met her husband, David Levy, during her sophomore year at Yale, and they married in June 2012.

In 2015, Pataki co-founded reConnect Hungary, an educational and social immersion program for young adults of Hungarian heritage, who are born in the United States or Canada, to gain a better understanding of their Hungarian heritage.

== Work ==
The Revolutionary War history of her town inspired Pataki to write her first book The Traitor's Wife based on the life of Benedict Arnold. The book explored a romantic triangle involving Arnold and also his roles in the Revolutionary War. Her book became a New York Times bestseller. Kirkus Reviews wrote that "Pataki delivers an admirable book focused on the betrayal."

Pataki's second and third books, also New York Times bestsellers, were The Accidental Empress and Sisi: Empress On Her Own, inspired by Pataki's family roots in the former Austro-Hungarian Empire. Kirkus Reviews felt that The Accidental Empress did not "stray far from the conventions of novels about royalty." Publishers Weekly wrote that the historical research for Sisi was "evident as she deftly explores the complex life of a woman who was both loved and hated by those whom she ruled." Kirkus Reviews wrote that Sisi was "a satisfying saga of the late Habsburg period."

Pataki's fourth book, Where the Light Falls, was released on July 11, 2017, and is co-authored with her brother Owen Pataki. Kirkus Reviews wrote that this book was also well-researched, but "sheer talkiness too often overpower the narrative, and the swashbucking close is too little, too late."

Pataki has written for ABCNews.com, The Huffington Post, FoxNews.com, Travel Girl, and other media outlets.

In 2016, Pataki wrote a piece for The New York Times detailing her family's experience with traumatic brain injury and recovery. In 2015, Pataki's husband, David Levy, suffered a near-fatal stroke while the couple were on board a flight to Seattle. Published in 2018, her book Beauty in the Broken Places chronicled that experience.

== Selected bibliography ==
- The Traitor's Wife: The Woman Behind Benedict Arnold and the Plan to Betray America (2014), published by Howard Books, a division of Simon & Schuster ISBN 978-1476738604
- The Accidental Empress (2015), published by Howard Books a division of Simon & Schuster ISBN 978-1476794747
- Sisi, Empress on Her Own (2016), published by The Dial Press, a division of Penguin Random House ISBN 978-0812989335
- Where the Light Falls: A Novel of the French Revolution (2018) published by The Dial Press, a division of Penguin Random House ISBN 978-0399591686
- Beauty in the Broken Places: A Memoir of Love, Faith, and Resilience (2018), published by Random House ISBN 978-0399591655
- Nelly Takes New York: A Little Girl's Adventures in the Big Apple (Big City Adventures) (2019), published by Simon & Schuster Books for Young Readers ISBN 978-1534425040
- The Queen's Fortune: A Novel of Desiree, Napoleon, and the Dynasty (2020), published by Ballantine Books ISBN 978-0593128183
- Poppy Takes Paris: A Little Girl's Adventures in the City of Light (Big City Adventures) (2020), published by Simon & Schuster Books for Young Readers ISBN 978-1534425064
- The Magnificent Lives of Marjorie Post (2022), published by Ballantine Books
- Finding Margaret Fuller (2024)
- It Girl (2026)
