= Ann Rockefeller Roberts =

Native American activist (1934–2024)

- Born: May 12, 1934; Manhattan, New York, U.S.
- Died: December 18, 2024 (aged 90)
- Parent(s): Nelson Rockefeller; Mary Clark
- Family: Rockefeller family

Ann Rockefeller Roberts (May 12, 1934 – December 18, 2024) was an activist for Native Americans. She was the eldest daughter of Nelson A. Rockefeller, the 49th governor of New York and the 41st vice president of the United States.

== Life and career ==
Roberts was born in Manhattan, New York on May 12, 1934. She founded the Fund of the Four Directions, which gave grants to organizations working for Native Americans. Roberts was also among the founding members of Women's World Banking.

Roberts was married and divorced thrice. She had four children from her first marriage to Robert Laughlin Pierson. Roberts died on December 18, 2024, at the age of 90.

== Books ==
Roberts was the author of two books.
