= James P. Kennedy Jr. =

United States Attorney

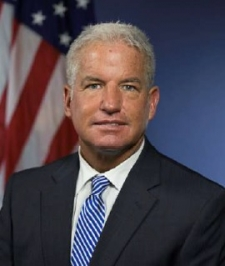

United States Attorney for the Western District of New York
- In office November 17, 2017 – October 11, 2021; Acting: October 29, 2016 – November 17, 2017
- Appointed by: Jeff Sessions
- President: Barack Obama; Donald Trump; Joe Biden
- Preceded by: William J. Hochul Jr.
- Succeeded by: Trini E. Ross

Personal details
- Education: Hamilton College (AB); University at Buffalo (JD)

James P. Kennedy Jr. is an American attorney who served as the United States Attorney for the Western District of New York from 2017 to 2021.

== Education ==
Kennedy received his Bachelor of Arts magna cum laude from Hamilton College and received his Juris Doctor cum laude from the University at Buffalo Law School in 1988 while serving as Editor of the Buffalo Law Review.

== Legal career ==
After graduation from law school, he served as a law clerk to Judges Michael F. Dillon and M. Dolores Denman of the New York Supreme Court, Appellate Division. In 1992, he was hired as an Assistant United States Attorney and in 1993 became an Organized Crime Drug Enforcement Task Force Attorney, prosecuting narcotics, violent crime and police corruption cases. In 2004 he became the appellate chief for the district. In 2006, he became the Chief of the White Collar General Crimes unit, and in 2007, he was promoted to Criminal Chief for the Western District of New York. In April 2010, he was selected by the United States Attorney William J. Hochul Jr. to be First Assistant U.S. Attorney.

=== Appointment as U.S. Attorney ===
On October 29, 2016, he was designated Acting United States Attorney. On November 17, 2017 Attorney General Jeff Sessions appointed Kennedy to be the United States Attorney for the Western District of New York. He left office on October 11, 2021, when his successor was sworn into office.
