= Mary Rockefeller =

First wife of Nelson Rockefeller (1907–1999)

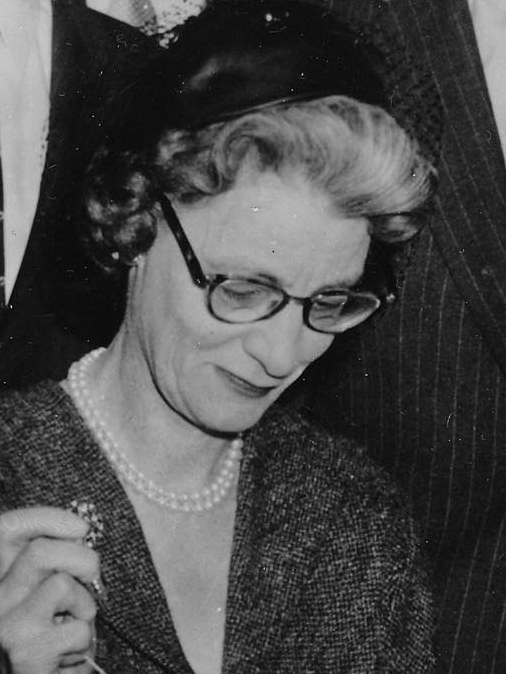
- Rockefeller as First Lady of New York

First Lady of New York
- In role January 1, 1959 – March 16, 1962
- Governor: Nelson Rockefeller
- Preceded by: Marie Norton Harriman
- Succeeded by: Happy Rockefeller

Personal details
- Born: Mary Todhunter Clark; June 17, 1907 Philadelphia, Pennsylvania, U.S.
- Died: April 21, 1999 (aged 91) New York City, U.S.
- Spouse: Nelson Rockefeller (m. 1930; div. 1962)
- Children: 5, including Rodman, Ann, Steven, and Michael
- Parent: Percy Hamilton Clark (father)
- Relatives: George B. Roberts (grandfather)
- Education: Foxcroft School

Mary Todhunter Clark Rockefeller (née Clark; June 17, 1907 – April 21, 1999) was the first wife of Nelson Rockefeller, the 49th governor of New York and the 41st vice president of the United States. She served as the first lady of New York from 1959 until the Rockefellers' divorce in March 1962. After their divorce, Nelson Rockefeller remained governor and would later become the 41st vice president of the United States, serving under President Gerald Ford.

== Early life ==
Known as Tod to her family, Mary was born in the Germantown section of Philadelphia on June 17, 1907. She was the daughter of Elizabeth Williams (née Roberts) Clark and Percy Hamilton Clark, an attorney and noted cricketer. Among her siblings were two brothers, John R. Clark and Dr. Thomas W. Clark.

Her maternal grandfather was George B. Roberts, a former president of the Pennsylvania Railroad.

Tod attended the Foxcroft School in Middleburg, Virginia and studied at the Sorbonne in France, but didn't graduate, instead returning to Philadelphia where she made her debut and became active in the Junior League.

== Career ==
In 1932, Mary began volunteering at the Bellevue School of Nursing in Manhattan, which was administered with Bellevue Hospital. She served on the school's board for many years, including a stint as the board president.

== Personal life ==
On June 23, 1930, Mary married Nelson Rockefeller, a grandson of John D. Rockefeller, at St. Asaph's Episcopal Church in Bala Cynwyd, Pennsylvania, with a reception at the home of her parents, a few days after Nelson had graduated from Dartmouth College. They had five children:

- Rodman Clark Rockefeller (1932–2000)
- Ann Rockefeller Roberts (1934–2024), a founder and president of the Fund of the Four Directions.
- Steven Clark Rockefeller (b. 1936), a former dean of Middlebury College.
- Mary Rockefeller Morgan (b. 1938), an author and a therapist specializing in twin grief.
- Michael Clark Rockefeller (1938–1961), Mary’s twin, who disappeared during an expedition in the Asmat region of southwestern Netherlands New Guinea.

Mary divorced her husband on March 16, 1962 in Reno, Nevada on grounds of extreme mental cruelty. A year later, "Happy" Murphy became the governor's second wife.

She died at her home on the Upper East Side of Manhattan in 1999 at the age of 91.

Honorary titles
| Preceded by Marie Norton Harriman | First Lady of New York; 1959–1962 | Succeeded by Margaretta Rockefeller |
