= UB Law =

UB Law may refer to:

- University of Baltimore School of Law, in Baltimore, Maryland
- University at Buffalo Law School, in Buffalo, New York
