= Happy Rockefeller =

Second Lady of the United States from 1974 to 1977

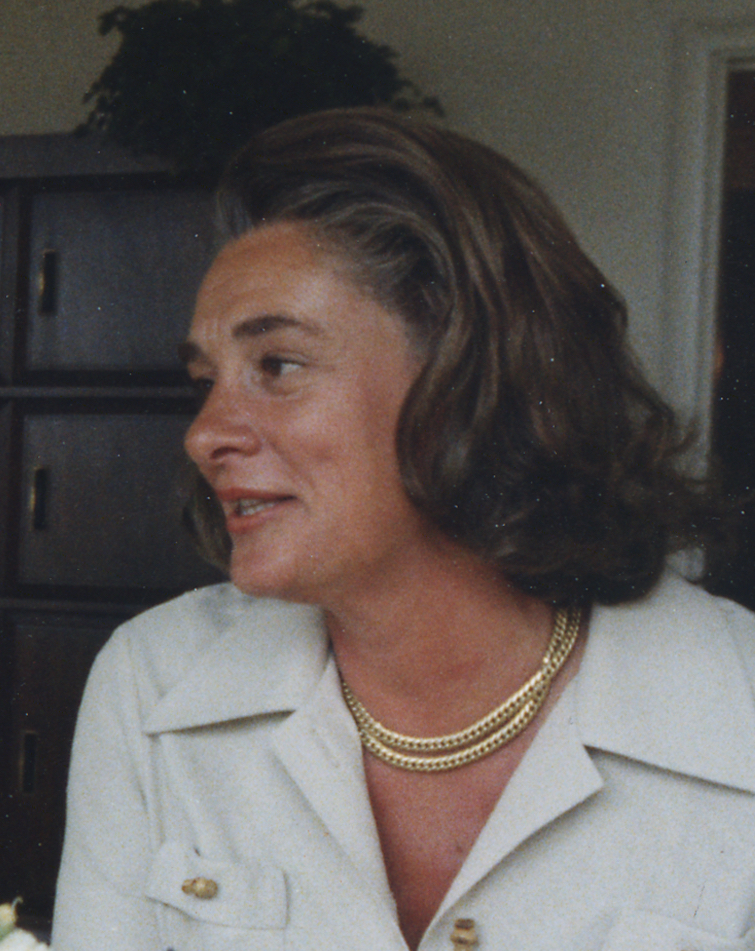
- Rockefeller in 1973

Second Lady of the United States
- In role December 19, 1974 – January 20, 1977
- Vice President: Nelson Rockefeller
- Preceded by: Betty Ford
- Succeeded by: Joan Mondale

First Lady of New York
- In role May 4, 1963 – December 18, 1973
- Governor: Nelson Rockefeller
- Preceded by: Mary Rockefeller
- Succeeded by: Katherine Wilson

Personal details
- Born: Margaretta Large Fitler; June 9, 1926 Bryn Mawr, Pennsylvania, U.S.
- Died: May 19, 2015 (aged 88) Pocantico Hills, New York, U.S.
- Resting place: Rockefeller Family Cemetery, Sleepy Hollow, New York
- Party: Republican
- Spouses: James Murphy (m. 1949; div. 1963) Nelson Rockefeller (m. 1963; died 1979)
- Children: 6, including Mark

Margaretta Large "Happy" Rockefeller (née Fitler, formerly Murphy; June 9, 1926 – May 19, 2015) was a philanthropist who, as the wife of the 41st vice president of the United States, Nelson Rockefeller, served as second lady of the United States from 1974 to 1977. She was previously the first lady of New York from 1963 to 1973, during her husband's last three terms in office.

In 1991, she was appointed a public delegate to the United Nations by US President George H. W. Bush. She also was president of the board of the Saratoga Performing Arts Center north of Albany, New York, among other philanthropic projects.

== Family and education ==
Margaretta Large Fitler was born in Bryn Mawr, Pennsylvania, in 1926. Her parents were Margaretta Large Harrison and William Wonderly Fitler Jr., an heir to a cordage fortune. Her mother would subsequently remarry. The younger Margaretta was known by her nickname, "Happy", given to her for her childhood disposition. She was a great-granddaughter of Philadelphia mayor Edwin Henry Fitler and a great-great-granddaughter of Union general George Gordon Meade, the commander at the Battle of Gettysburg, and his wife Margaretta Sergeant, daughter of politician John Sergeant.

She graduated from the Shipley School in Bryn Mawr, Pennsylvania in 1944.

== Marriages and career ==
=== First marriage and volunteering ===
In the later part of World War II, she was a driver in the Women's Volunteer Service.

In 1948 she married James Slater Murphy, a virologist associated with the Rockefeller Institute and a close friend of Nelson Rockefeller's. They had four children: James B. Murphy, II, Margaretta Harrison Murphy, Carol Slater Murphy, and Malinda Fitler Murphy (1960–2005).

In 1958, Happy signed up to serve as a volunteer on Nelson Rockefeller's gubernatorial campaign. The following year she became the newly elected governor's private secretary, then resigned from his office staff in 1961. Happy and her husband divorced on April 1, 1963, for reasons The New York Times called "grievous mental anguish" and which her former husband's lawyer classified as "irreconcilable differences".

=== Second marriage and 1964 presidential campaign ===
She married New York Governor Nelson Rockefeller on May 4, 1963, at the home of Laurance S. Rockefeller in Pocantico Hills, New York. Rockefeller was eighteen years her senior and had divorced his first wife, Mary Todhunter Clark, on March 16, 1962. Happy and Nelson Rockefeller went on to have two sons together: Nelson Rockefeller Jr. (born 1964), and Mark Rockefeller (born 1967).

There has been speculation surrounding Malinda Fitler Menotti, the youngest daughter of Happy Rockefeller and James Slater Murphy, with many in the Rockefeller inner circle believing her to be Nelson Rockefeller's daughter. In his diary, Rockefeller close friend Ken Riland used a tone of knowing irony when mentioning Malinda, putting the word stepfather in quotes. Ellen, the wife of Wallace Harrison, the architect and close friend of Nelson Rockefeller, claimed that Malinda's parentage was an open secret among Rockefeller associates.

Nelson Rockefeller first campaigned for president in 1960, during which time he remained governor of New York, and Mary Rockefeller remained first lady of New York. According to The Independent, Happy was pregnant during the 1964 campaign, and made "a fine candidate's wife on the campaign trail." However, political pundits "blamed the marriage for Nelson Rockefeller's failure to secure the 1964 Republican presidential nomination," as at that time, no divorced candidate had secured the US presidency. As the British journalist Lady Jeanne Campbell wrote in the London Evening Standard, when the Murphy-Rockefeller involvement became a subject of media scrutiny after the announcement of Rockefeller's filing for divorce from his first wife and Happy Murphy's resignation from his staff, "Already people are comparing Happy Murphy to the Duchess of Windsor when she was plain Mrs. Simpson." More damaging still was the political fallout for Rockefeller. Echoing the party-wide concerns, an official of the Michigan Republican Party told The New York Times that the couple's potential marriage likely would cost Rockefeller the 1964 presidential nomination. "The rapidity of it all—he gets a divorce, she gets a divorce—and the indication of the break-up of two homes. Our country doesn't like broken homes." Nelson began to drop in the polls and withdrew from the race after losing several primaries, with the election going to Lyndon Johnson after Rockefeller was replaced as the Republican front-runner by Barry Goldwater.

=== 1968 US presidential campaign ===
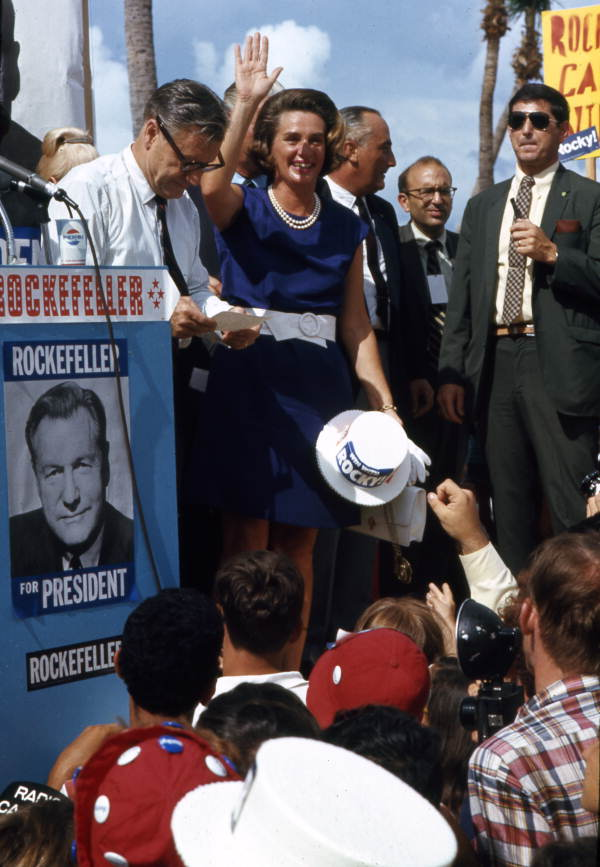
Happy and Nelson Rockefeller campaigning in Florida, August 1968

In 1968, she accompanied her husband on the campaign trail as he again ran for US president. Women's Wear Daily quoted Norman Norell, whose clothes she wore on the campaign trail, as stating "she has that good family, Ivy League look. She will always look right — never gussied up, never silly. She is not interested in excitement for excitement's sake." She also wore designs by Oscar de la Renta, Bill Blass, Chanel, Grès, Dior, Valentino and Donald Brooks. WWD also noted that she was "known for relaxed charm" and frankness, with the latter to such a point that his 1968 campaign had an internal rule that she was not to be quoted directly. Rockefeller lost the campaign, with Richard Nixon taking the White House.

According to Richard Norton Smith, Nelson's biographer, Happy's "quiet advocacy, first with her husband" and then with New York State Senate president Earl Brydges helped bring about the 1970 repeal of New York's abortion ban.

=== First Lady of New York ===
Her husband was reelected governor of New York two more times after they married. Rockefeller stepped down as governor of New York in December 1973, three years into his fourth term.

After discovering tumors in a self-inspection, she underwent surgery on October 17, 1974, in an operation that was described in a news conference by her doctor, Jerome Urban of Memorial Hospital for Cancer and Allied Diseases, and her husband. Both President Ford and Henry Kissinger, then Secretary of State, phoned the families with best wishes after the announcement. The operation was reported on in detail by publications such as The New York Times. According to WWD, the combination of Happy Rockefeller and Betty Ford, as well as Shirley Temple, coming public about their cancer treatments helped raise awareness of a disease that had been extremely stigmatized.

=== Second Lady of the United States ===
After the Watergate scandal in 1974, Gerald Ford named Nelson Rockefeller to serve as his vice president. She became the Second Lady of the United States when her husband became the vice president of Gerald Ford. For the term, the couple moved to Washington, D.C., where they entertained in the vice president's mansion, but lived in their own house. Over the years, the couple also maintained residences in Seal Harbor, Maine, Venezuela, and Manhattan, where they had an apartment on Fifth Avenue designed by Jean-Michel Frank. They also lived at the 3,000-acre (1,200 ha) family estate in Pocantico Hills, New York, named Kykuit.

Her husband died in January 1979, two years after having left the vice presidency. She continued to entertain at 812 Fifth Avenue and at the Rockefeller estate, the Japanese House. In 1982, Happy Rockefeller hosted an event at her Fifth Avenue apartment for Henry Kissinger, celebrating the publication of the second volume of his memoirs. At the time, Happy said she and Kissinger had been friends since around 1962.

In 1985, she lent a tapestry of Picasso's anti-war themed Guernica to the UN, and after a year of cleaning and preservation, it hangs again since 2022 outside the Security Council chambers. In 1991, she was appointed a public delegate to the United Nations by US President George H. W. Bush. She also became president of the board of the Saratoga Performing Arts Center at north Albany, New York. She supported the Philadelphia Orchestra's annual visits to China and the Franklin D. Roosevelt Four Freedoms Park in New York City, the Central Park Conservancy, and Historic Hudson Valley.

Her residence in Pocantico Hills, Kykuit, was given to the National Trust for Historic Preservation and in 1994 was opened to the public. Afterward, she moved into the Japanese House estate.

== Health and death ==
Rockefeller was a breast cancer survivor, having undergone a double mastectomy in 1974, two weeks after Betty Ford, then First Lady of the United States, underwent a single mastectomy.

Happy Rockefeller died on May 19, 2015, at the age of 88, following a short illness. She died at her home in Tarrytown, New York, in her sleep. She was survived by six children.

== Art collection ==
As of 1982, Nelson Rockefeller had donated a large part of the couple's painting collection to the Museum of Modern Art, knowing the estate would be heavily taxed. Their apartment was filled with replicas of many of the donated paintings. However, while much of their collection of items was donated to museums, Happy held on to pieces such as art objects and jewelry. In 2018, a large collection of Happy and Nelson Rockefeller's belongings was auctioned at Sotheby's in three sales of around 450 items, with total proceeds expected to exceed $6.1 million. The sale included a selection of Happy's jewelry including a custom collection by Van Cleef & Arpels. The auction also included items from their Fifth Avenue apartment.

== See also ==
- First ladies and gentlemen of New York
- Rockefeller family

Honorary titles
Preceded by Mary Rockefeller	First Lady of New York; 1963–1973	Succeeded by Katherine Wilson
Vacant Title last held by Betty Ford	Second Lady of the United States; 1974–1977	Succeeded by Joan Mondale
