= Pierson v. Ray =

- Supreme Court of the United States

Argued January 11, 1967 Decided April 11, 1967
- Full case name: Robert L. Pierson v. J. L. Ray
- Citations: 386 U.S. 547 (more) 87 S. Ct. 1213; 18 L. Ed. 2d 288; 1967 U.S. LEXIS 2791
- Argument: Oral argument

Case history
- Prior: Pierson v. Ray, 352 F.2d 213 (5th Cir. 1965); cert. granted, 384 U.S. 938 (1966)

Court membership
- Chief Justice Earl Warren Associate Justices Hugo Black · William O. Douglas; Tom C. Clark · John M. Harlan II; William J. Brennan Jr. · Potter Stewart; Byron White · Abe Fortas

Case opinions
- Majority: Warren, joined by Black, Clark, Harlan, Brennan, Stewart, White, Fortas
- Dissent: Douglas
- Superseded by
- Harlow v. Fitzgerald, Anderson v. Creighton

Pierson v. Ray, 386 U.S. 547 (1967), was a United States Supreme Court case in which the Court first introduced the justification for qualified immunity for police officers from being sued for civil rights violations under Section 1983, by arguing that "[a] policeman's lot is not so unhappy that he must choose between being charged with dereliction of duty if he does not arrest when he had probable cause, and being mulcted in damages if he does."

== Background ==
The case refers to the incident in Jackson, Mississippi where 15 Episcopal priests were arrested after entering the coffee shop at the local Trailways bus terminal. The group were part of 28 priests from Episcopal Society for Cultural and Racial Unity, taking part in the Mississippi Freedom Rides, traveling from the Deep South to the Great Lakes. Meeting on the evening of September 11, 1961 in New Orleans, they left the following day on a chartered bus which would take them via McComb into Tougaloo, a small town outside Jackson. They would then split into three groups traveling north via Sewanee into Detroit.

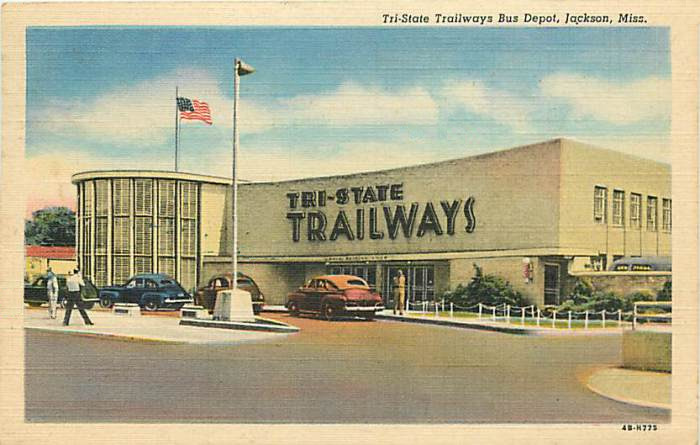
Tri-State Trailways depot, Jackson, Miss. (1940s postcard)

=== Incident ===
On September 13, 1961, a group of 15, including three black priests took taxis from Tougaloo into the nearby Jackson Trailways bus terminal to catch the bus to Chattanooga. When entering the coffee shop to have lunch before their departure, they were stopped by two policemen, Officers David Allison Nichols and Joseph David Griffith, who asked them to leave. After the priests refused to leave, Captain J. L. Ray arrested and jailed all 15 priests for breach of peace, using a now-repealed section of the Mississippi code § 2087.5 that "makes guilty of a misdemeanor anyone who congregates with others in a public place under circumstances such that a breach of the peace may be occasioned thereby, and refuses to move on when ordered to do so by a police officer."

The group included 35-year-old Reverend Robert L. Pierson, who was son-in-law to the Republican Governor of New York, Nelson Rockefeller. They were brought to trial before the local judge James Spencer who found them guilty of breach of peace and sentenced them to four months in jail and $200 fine. After raising money for bail, they appealed the case de novo in the Hinds County Court. The case against the priests was dismissed by Judge Russell Moore showing no violation of law (directed verdict) on May 21, 1962.

=== Civil claim for damages under Section 1983 ===
Represented by Carl Rachlin, the chief legal counsel at Congress of Racial Equality, they sought damages in the Jackson district court before Judge Sidney Mize, alleging the police and the local judge had violated Title 42, Section 1983 of the 1871 Ku Klux Klan Act by false arrest and imprisonment for exercising their civil rights. However, the jury found in favor of the police who said they were trying to prevent imminent violence from a gathered crowd, contradicting the evidence of the priests.

On appeal, the Court of Appeals for the Fifth Circuit found that the local judge was immune from liability for his decision. Although the appeal court found the Mississippi code unconstitutional, it found that "Mississippi law does not require police officers to predict at their peril which state laws are constitutional and which are not."

== Supreme Court ==
Rachlin appealed to the Supreme Court on behalf of four of the priests: Robert L. Pierson, John B. Morris, James P. Breeden and James G. Jones Jr – Breeden was the only black petitioner. The defendants were Police Chief (then Captain) J. L. Ray, his two officers Griffiths and Nichols, and municipal police justice, Judge James Spencer. Captain Ray and Judge Spencer had already arrested and sentenced more than 300 Freedom Riders for "breach of peace" before this incident. They were represented by Elizabeth Watkins Hulen Grayson.

Rachlin had made the argument on the basis of the Civil Rights Act of 1871's section 1979, which was codified into the US Civil Code Title 42 Chapter 21 Section 1983. The original 1871 Act stated that

Every person who, under color of any statute, ordinance, regulation, custom, or usage, of any State or Territory, subjects, or causes to be subjected, any citizen of the United States or other person within the jurisdiction thereof to the deprivation of any rights, privileges, or immunities secured by the Constitution and laws, shall be liable to the party injured in an action at law, suit in equity, or other proper proceeding for redress.

=== Ruling ===
Eight of the nine justices agreed with the Fifth Circuit that Judge Spencer had absolute immunity from liability for damages, and that Section 1983 would not apply in a judge's case, stating that "the immunity of judges for acts within the judicial role is equally well established, and we presume that Congress would have specifically so provided had it wished to abolish the doctrine." This principle of immunity of judges from liability for damages was established in common law as found in the case Bradley v. Fisher (1872).

They went on to state that although police officers are not granted absolute and unqualified immunity from liability for damages, they may be excused "from liability for acting under a statute that he reasonably believed to be valid but that was later held unconstitutional, on its face or as applied", similar to the principle that a police officer "... who arrests someone with probable cause is not liable for false arrest simply because the innocence of the suspect is later proved."

However, the justices found that the jury trial was influenced by irrelevant and prejudicial evidence, which included trying to get the priests to agree that their views on racial justice and equality aligned with the Communist movement. They also disagreed with the appeal court that the priests had consented to their arrest merely by gathering in the terminal under the principle of volenti non fit injuria. Therefore, a new trial could be remanded to claim damages against the police.

Only Justice Douglas dissented, stating that Section 1983 must include the judiciary who too must be liable for civil rights violations in the course of their duties. He pointed to the debate in Congress during the Act's inception where "members of Congress objected to the statute because it imposed liability on members of the judiciary." Accordingly, as the Act was passed without providing any exception for the judiciary, he concluded that Congress intended for Section 1983 to apply to 'any person', including judges.

== Legacy ==
=== US Civil Code ===
Following this interpretation, Section 1983 of the Civil Code was amended twice, once in 1979 to include Washington, D.C. within its remits. The later 1996 amendment was part of a series of amendments to the US Code included in the Federal Courts Improvement Act of 1996. Although the submitted Bill by Sen Chuck Grassley (R-IA) sought to streamline the judiciary and make it more efficient, it was amended by the Senate Judiciary Committee led by Sen Orrin Hatch to include provisions to protect judicial officers from liability. The committee gave the following justification for codifying immunity for the judiciary in this amendment.

This section restores the doctrine of judicial immunity to the status it occupied prior to the Supreme Court's decision in Pulliam v. Allen, 466 U.S. 522 (1984), and has the support of the American Judges Association, the Conference of Chief Judges of the National Center for State Courts, and the American Bar Association.

...In Pulliam, the Supreme Court broke with 400 years of common-law tradition and weakened judicial immunity protections. The case concerned a State magistrate who jailed an individual for failing to post bond for an offense which could be punished only by a fine and not incarceration. The defendant filed an action under 42 U.S.C. 1983, obtaining both an injunction against the magistrate's practice of requiring bonds for nonincarcerable offenses, and an award of costs, including attorney's fees. The Supreme Court affirmed, expressly holding that judicial immunity is not a bar to injunctive relief in section 1983 actions against a State judge acting in a judicial capacity, or to the award of attorney's fees under the Civil Rights Attorney Fees Award Act, 42 U.S.C. 1988. Those statutes are now amended to preclude awards of costs and attorney's fees against judges for acts taken in their judicial capacity, and to bar injunctive relief unless declaratory relief is inadequate.

In the 12 years since Pulliam, thousands of Federal cases have been filed against judges and magistrates. The overwhelming majority of these cases lack merit and are ultimately dismissed. The record from the Committee's previous hearings on this issue is replete with examples of judges having to defend themselves against frivolous cases. Even when cases are routinely dismissed, the very process of defending against those actions is vexatious and subjects judges to undue expense. More importantly, the risk to judges of burdensome litigation creates a chilling effect that threatens judicial independence and may impair the day-to-day decisions of the judiciary in close or controversial cases.

Subsection 311(a) codifies the general prohibition against holding judicial officers (justices, judges and magistrates) liable for costs, including attorney's fees, for acts or omissions taken in their judicial capacity. Subsection 311(b) amends 42 U.S.C. 1988 to prohibit holding judicial officers liable for costs or fees. Subsection 311(c) amends 42 U.S.C. 1983 to bar a Federal judge from granting injunctive relief against a State judge, unless declaratory relief is unavailable or the State judge violated a declaratory decree. In short, subsection (a) states the general rule, while subsections (b) and (c) specifically address the statutes at issue in Pulliam. The legislation extends protection to Federal as well as State judicial officers out of concern that Federal judges otherwise might be subject to cost and fee awards in cases alleging Federal constitutional torts. See, e.g., Bivens v. Six Unknown Named Agents of the Federal Bureau of Narcotics, 403 U.S. 388 (1977); Butz v. Economu[sic], 438 U.S. 478 (1978).

This section does not provide absolute immunity for judicial officers. Immunity is not granted for any conduct "clearly in excess" of a judge's jurisdiction, even if the act is taken in a judicial capacity. Moreover, litigants may still seek declaratory relief, and may obtain injunctive relief if a declaratory decree is violated or is otherwise unavailable. Section 311 restores the full scope of judicial immunity lost in Pulliam and will go far in eliminating frivolous and harassing lawsuits which threaten the independence and objective decision-making essential to the judicial process.

=== Current version ===
The current version reads (amendments from original are shown with emphasis):

Every person who, under color of any statute, ordinance, regulation, custom, or usage, of any State or Territory or the District of Columbia, subjects, or causes to be subjected, any citizen of the United States or other person within the jurisdiction thereof to the deprivation of any rights, privileges, or immunities secured by the Constitution and laws, shall be liable to the party injured in an action at law, suit in equity, or other proper proceeding for redress, except that in any action brought against a judicial officer for an act or omission taken in such officer's judicial capacity, injunctive relief shall not be granted unless a declaratory decree was violated or declaratory relief was unavailable.

=== Congress 2020 ===
Following a number of civilian deaths during encounters with US police, there was a heightened awareness of the case and the concept of qualified immunity, coming to a head with the murder of George Floyd in May 2020. Numerous other similar cases where the government had settled cases and law enforcement officers were able to claim qualified immunity came to light, placing public pressure on Congress to rectify the situation.

In the Senate, Cory Booker (D-NJ) introduced a resolution which asserts that the broad overreach and injustice of the concept of qualified immunity stemming from successive Supreme Court decisions is based "on a mistaken judicial interpretation of a statute enacted by Congress".

In the House of Representatives, Justin Amash (L-MI) introduced the Ending Qualified Immunity Act which criticized the interpretation of Section 1983 by the Supreme Court in Pierson v. Ray and subsequent rulings, claiming that the interpretation is erroneous. It adds the following text to Section 1983.

It shall not be a defense or immunity to any action brought under this section that the defendant was acting in good faith, or that the defendant believed, reasonably or other wise, that his or her conduct was lawful at the time when it was committed. Nor shall it be a defense or immunity that the rights, privileges, or immunities secured by the Constitution or laws were not clearly established at the time of their deprivation by the defendant, or that the state of the law was otherwise such that the defendant could not reasonably have been expected to know whether his or her conduct was lawful.

Rep Karen Bass (D-CA) introduced a separate bill that has passed the House of Representatives 236-181. It was not passed in the Senate as it did not have any support from the Republican majority in the upper house. It was again passed in the House on March 3, 2021 but did not pass in the Senate. In this bill, Section 1983 would be amended by adding the following text:

It shall not be a defense or immunity in any action brought under this section against a local law enforcement officer (as such term is defined in section 2 of the George Floyd Justice in Policing Act of 2020), or in any action under any source of law against a Federal investigative or law enforcement officer (as such term is defined in section 2680(h) of title 28, United States Code), that—

(1) the defendant was acting in good faith, or that the defendant believed, reasonably or otherwise, that his or her conduct was lawful at the time when the conduct was committed; or

(2) the rights, privileges, or immunities secured by the Constitution and laws were not clearly established at the time of their deprivation by the defendant, or that at such time, the state of the law was otherwise such that the defendant could not reasonably have been expected to know whether his or her conduct was lawful.

== See also ==
- Monroe v. Pape
- Hope v. Pelzer
- Johnson v. Jones
- Scott v. Harris
- Plumhoff v. Rickard
- United States v. Lanier
- George Floyd Justice in Policing Act of 2020
- Ending Qualified Immunity Act
