= Robert Laughlin Pierson =

Episcopal cleric (1926–1997)

The Reverend Robert Laughlin Pierson
- 1961 mugshot after Pierson's arrest in Jackson, Mississippi
- Born: March 9, 1926; Chicago, Illinois, U.S.
- Died: April 13, 1997 (aged 71); Saint Petersburg, Florida, U.S.
- Education: Lawrence University; University of Wisconsin; Nashotah House (MDiv)
- Occupation: Episcopal clergyman
- Known for: Freedom Rider
- Movement: Civil rights
- Spouse: Ann Clark Rockefeller (m. 1955; div. 1966)

Robert Laughlin Pierson (1926–1997) was an Episcopal clergyman and Freedom Rider and a named appellant in Pierson v. Ray, 386 U.S. 547 (1967).

== Life ==
He was born in Chicago on March 9, 1926.

He graduated from Lawrence University, the University of Wisconsin, and Nashotah House with a master of divinity (MDiv).

He served at St. Barnabas' Episcopal Church. In 1961, he was arrested at Jackson, Mississippi, with the Freedom Riders. Pierson was among the litigants who pursued damages against the police based on the Civil Rights Act of 1871 and was the named appellant in the 1967 U.S. Supreme Court case, Pierson v. Ray which found that the police had Qualified Immunity, and rejected Pierson's claims.

He died from a heart attack at the age of 71 on April 13, 1997, in St. Petersburg, Florida.

== Family ==
In 1955, he married Ann Clark Rockefeller, daughter of Nelson Rockefeller. They divorced in 1966.
