= Silda Wall Spitzer =

First Lady of New York from 2007 to 2008

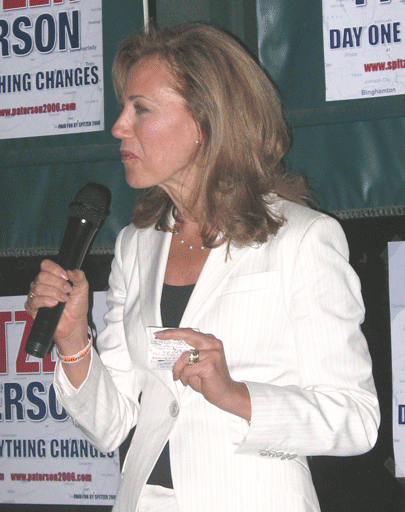
- Silda Wall Spitzer in Rochester, 2006

First Lady of New York
- In role January 1, 2007 – March 17, 2008
- Governor: Eliot Spitzer
- Preceded by: Libby Pataki
- Succeeded by: Michelle Paige Paterson

Personal details
- Born: Silda Alice Wall; December 30, 1957 (age 68) Chapel Hill, North Carolina, U.S.
- Spouse: Eliot Spitzer (m. 1987; div. 2013)
- Children: 3
- Education: Meredith College (BA); Harvard University (JD)
- Occupation: Lawyer private equity entrepreneur

Silda Alice Wall Spitzer (born December 30, 1957) is an American businesswoman and lawyer who was the First Lady of New York from January 2007 until March 2008, when her then husband, Eliot Spitzer, was governor. She has worked in the private, nonprofit, and public sectors in the areas of green/sustainability issues, youth service/education, and human rights and women's financial and other empowerment.

Currently, she is director and principal at NewWorld Capital Group, a private equity firm investing in environmental and energy-related products and services. She is also co-founder and CEO of woman-owned New York Makers, a digital magazine and marketplace covering New York State.

== Early life ==
Born Silda Alice Wall, she grew up in Concord, the county seat of Cabarrus County in south-central North Carolina. Her father, Robert, was a hospital administrator, and her mother, Trilby, was a homemaker. She was raised as a Southern Baptist. She graduated summa cum laude from Meredith College in 1980 with a B.A. in English and history. She received a Juris Doctor from Harvard Law School in 1984.

== Personal life ==
She married Eliot Spitzer on October 17, 1987, and had three daughters: Elyssa, Sarabeth, and Jenna. In December 2013, Wall and her husband announced the end of their marriage.

== Career ==
Wall began her legal career with Skadden, Arps, Slate, Meagher & Flom, specializing in mergers, acquisitions and corporate finance. She next joined The Chase Manhattan Bank, N.A. as a member of its international legal group. She is a founding co-chair of Project Cicero, the annual New York City book drive that builds classroom libraries in under-resourced schools. She served on the New York Blue Ribbon Commission on Youth Leadership and the board of the Children's Museum of Manhattan from 1995 until January 1999, where she was a member of its executive committee and chaired its program committee.

In 1996, she co-founded Children for Children, a not-for-profit organization, to engage children from an early age in volunteering and service. She served as its president and chair until 2007. CFC has become the youth service division of Points of Light and is now called generationOn.

As the wife of former New York Governor Eliot Spitzer, she was the First Lady of New York from January 2007 until March 2008. From 2008 to 2011, she was managing director at Metropolitan Capital Advisors, a woman-owned hedge fund.

Currently, she is director and principal at NewWorld Capital Group, a private equity firm investing in growth equity and infrastructure project finance environmental opportunities, including energy efficiency, clean energy, water, waste-to-value, and environmental products and services. She is also co-founder and CEO of a woman-owned New York Makers, a digital magazine and marketplace covering New York State.

Among her not-for-profit activities, Spitzer serves as the vice-chairperson of Urban Green Council, is on the Ceres president's council, and the Sustainable Endowments Institute's advisory board. She also served on the boards of Points of Light and generationOn until 2015. She is a board member at Meredith College and the Center for Law, Brain, and Behavior, and is an honorary trustee of No Bully.

== Honors ==
- She was awarded an honorary doctorate from Meredith College in 2012.

Honorary titles
Preceded by Libby Pataki	First Lady of New York; 2007–2008	Succeeded by Michelle Paige Paterson
