= Hugh B. Scott =

American judge (1949–2021)

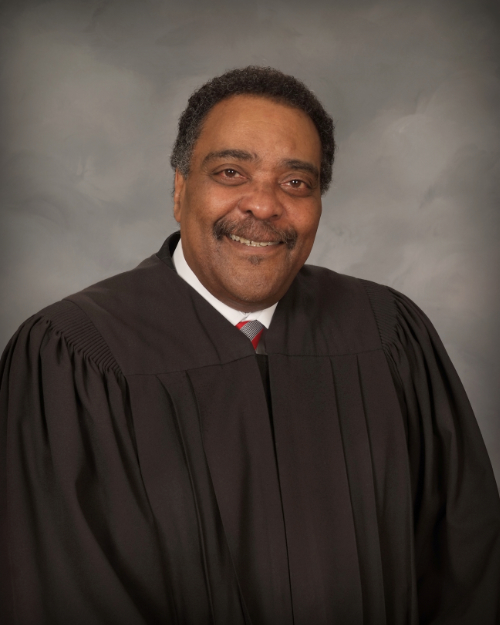

Magistrate Judge of the Western District of New York
- In office June 1, 1995 – July 1, 2015

Personal details
- Born: 1949 Amherst, New York
- Died: February 19, 2021 (aged 71–72)

Hugh B. Scott (1949 – February 19, 2021) was a magistrate judge of United States District Court for the Western District of New York. He was appointed on June 1, 1995, and he retired on July 1, 2015.

Scott was the first African American to become assistant attorney general in charge in Western New York, as well as the first African American to become assistant United States Attorney, assistant corporation counsel and assistant county attorney. At age 32, Scott was elected to the Buffalo City Court. He was re-elected to another 10-year term before leaving the position to become the first African American to sit on the federal bench in the Western District of New York.

Scott was born in 1949 in Amherst, New York, and he received his B.A. from Niagara University in 1971 and his J.D. from the University at Buffalo Law School in 1974. He died on February 19, 2021.
