= Salvatore R. Martoche =

American judge

Associate Justice of the Appellate Division, New York Fourth Department
- In office May 3, 2004 – August 28, 2013
- Appointed by: Governor George Pataki

Justice of the Supreme, New York 8th Judicial District
- In office January 2000 – May 2004

Personal details
- Born: Salvatore Richard Martoche; October 12, 1940 (age 85) Buffalo, New York, U.S.
- Party: Republican
- Spouse: Mary Dee Martoche
- Education: Canisius College (BS); University of North Dakota School of Law (JD)
- Nickname: Sal

Salvatore Richard Martoche (born October 12, 1940) is an American lawyer and a retired judge of the NYS Supreme Court, Appellate Division.

== Early life and education ==
Martoche was born in Buffalo, New York. He received his Bachelor of Science from Canisius College in 1962 and his Juris Doctor from the University of North Dakota School of Law in 1967.

== Career ==
He was a public defender before going into private practice from 1969 to 1982. He served as assistant counsel to the majority for the New York State Senate from 1974 to 1982 and administrator for the Erie County Bar Association of the Pre-Trial Services Agency, Inc. from 1972 to 1981.

Hide in Plain Sight, the 1980 movie starring James Caan, is based on one of Martoche's cases. He is credited with reforms in the United States Federal Witness Protection Program.

Martoche was United States Attorney for the Western District of New York from 1982 to 1986, and was a member of the Attorney General's Advisory Committee from 1983 to 1986, serving as vice chairman in 1984 and chairman in 1985.

He was assistant secretary of labor (enforcement) under President Ronald Reagan from May 1986 to 1988.

In the Spring of 1988, Martoche turned down an offer from Attorney General Edwin Meese to replace William Weld as head of the criminal division of the Department of Justice. Weld and Deputy Attorney General Arnold Burns had resigned in protest of Meese's leadership in the Justice Department. Martoche told colleagues that he did not want to be publicly associated with Meese. Messe subsequently resigned over his involvement in the Wedtech scandal.

On April 19, 1988, President Reagan announced his intention to nominate Martoche to be a member of the National Mediation Board for the term expiring July 1, 1991. From 1988 to 1990, he served as an assistant secretary of the treasury, overseeing law enforcement operations under President Reagan and President George H. W. Bush. Before leaving federal service, Martoche was a key official involved in the response to the savings and loan crisis, serving as the acting director of the Office of Thrift Supervision.

In the 1990s, Martoche was in private practice in Buffalo and served as one of six commissioners of the state Commission of Investigation, which investigates organized crime and public corruption statewide.

Martoche served as a New York State Supreme Court justice for 13 years from January 2000 until his retirement. He was designated to serve on the New York Supreme Court, Appellate Division Fourth Department on May 3, 2004, by Governor George Pataki.

In August 2013 Judge Martoche retired from the bench and joined a Buffalo law firm as head of its Alternative dispute resolution practice group.

== Personal life ==
Martoche married attorney Mary Dee Benesh in 1967.

== Awards and honors ==
- Buffalo State College alumni association Criminal Justice award 1983
- Ellis Island Medal of Honor 1992
- US Treasury Alexander Hamilton Award
- The Buffalo News Citizen of the Year 1988
- Canisius College Lasalle Medal 1979
- Canisius College Distinguished Alumni Award 1986
