= One Jerusalem =

One Jerusalem is an organisation with the stated mission of "maintaining a united Jerusalem as the undivided capital of Israel". It was founded as a response to the Oslo Peace Process, specifically, out of a concern that the settlement might lead to Palestinian sovereignty over Jerusalem's Temple Mount or Noble Sanctuary.

Chaired by former Deputy Prime Minister Natan Sharansky, the organisation is entirely publicly funded. One Jerusalem's website describes its activities as follows: "One Jerusalem organizes, educates and rallies supporters in Israel and all democratic countries, so that we can educate elected government officials".

An inaugural rally organised by One Jerusalem in January 2001 to protest the proposal of Palestinian sovereignty over the Temple Mount attracted a crowd variously described as thousands (CNN Report 2001-01-08), 100,000 (Israeli TV reports via CNN) and 400,000 (One Jerusalem).

One Jerusalem has over 100,000 members from across the globe.

== Founding Members ==
The founding members of this foundation include the following individuals:

- David Bar-Illan
- Rabbi Chaskel Besser
- The Baroness Cox
- Dore Gold
- Emil L. Fackenheim
- Douglas Feith
- David Horowitz
- Jean Kahn, Yechiel Leiter
- Jackie Mason
- Nancy Montgomery
- Libby Pataki
- Eli Pollack
- Tom Rose
- Natan Sharansky
- Michael D. Siegal
- Ron Silver
- David P. Steinmann
