= Mark Rockefeller =

American family heir (born 1967)

- Born: Mark Fitler Rockefeller; January 26, 1967 (age 59)
- Education: Deerfield Academy
- Alma mater: Princeton University (BA); Harvard University (MBA)
- Spouse: Renee Anne Anisko (m. 1998; div. 2020)
- Children: 4
- Parent(s): Nelson Rockefeller; Margaretta "Happy" Fitler
- Relatives: See Rockefeller family

Mark Fitler Rockefeller (born January 26, 1967) is a fourth-generation member of the Rockefeller family. He is the younger son of former U.S. Vice President Nelson A. Rockefeller (1908–1979) and former Second Lady Happy Rockefeller (1926–2015). Through his father, Rockefeller is a grandson of American financier John D. Rockefeller Jr. and a great-grandson of Standard Oil co-founder John D. Rockefeller. He was chairman of the board of directors of the National Fish and Wildlife Foundation in 2010.

== Early life ==
Rockefeller grew up at Kykuit, the central mansion on his family's estate in Pocantico, Westchester County, in New York State. He is an alumnus of the Buckley School, Deerfield Academy (1985), Princeton University (BA 1989), and Harvard University (MBA 1996). He played football, basketball, and baseball at Deerfield, and played football at Princeton, where in 1988 he was considered one of the Ivy League's best tight ends.

== Career ==
Rockefeller and his former wife own South Fork Lodge and South Fork Outfitters, both in Swan Valley, Idaho. Previously, he was an associate in the Acquisition Finance Group at Chase Securities, Inc.

In 1999 he was elected chairman of the non-profit organization, Historic Hudson Valley, founded by his grandfather John D. Rockefeller Jr. in 1951. Mark Rockefeller's older brother, Nelson Rockefeller Jr., has also served on its board.

In a 2013 article about federal farm subsidy programs, the New York Post reported that 1,500 affluent New Yorkers had received payments. Among them was Rockefeller, who received $342,634 in farm subsidies over the course of ten years from 2001 to 2011 for allowing farmland to return to its natural condition.

== Personal life ==
In 1998, Rockefeller married Renee Anne Anisko (b. 1968) at the Church of the Magdalene in Pocantico Hills. She has a Juris Doctor degree cum laude from the Temple University Beasley School of Law. They have four children. They divorced in 2020.
