= Libby Pataki =

First Lady of New York

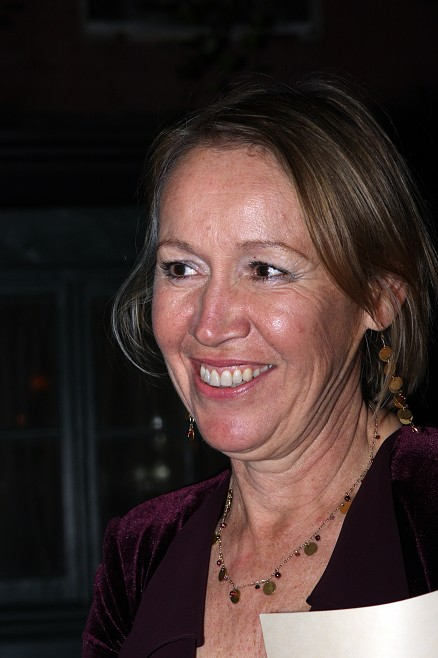
- Pataki in November 2007

First Lady of New York
- In role January 1, 1995 – December 31, 2006
- Governor: George Pataki
- Preceded by: Matilda Cuomo
- Succeeded by: Silda Wall

First Lady of Peekskill
- In role January 1, 1981 – December 31, 1984
- Preceded by: Priscilla Bianco
- Succeeded by: Ruth Jackson

Personal details
- Born: Mary Elizabeth Rowland; November 17, 1950 (age 75) Dallas, Texas, U.S.
- Party: Republican
- Spouse: George Pataki (m. 1973)
- Children: 4, including Allison Pataki
- Education: Clark University

Libby Pataki (born Mary Elizabeth Rowland; November 17, 1950) is the former First Lady of New York and the wife of former New York Governor George Pataki. She served as First Lady from 1995 to 2006 during the three terms of her husband's administration.

== Life and career ==
Pataki was born in Dallas, Texas, to Monique (Leblanc) and Col. Henry C. Rowland, Jr., an army officer and diplomat. Her mother was French.

As First Lady, Pataki focused on promoting the state's agriculture industry and preventing breast cancer. Traveling throughout the state of New York, she worked to increase public awareness of breast cancer.

Pataki is a former marketing executive who managed the family farm in Peekskill, New York. As First Lady, Pataki accepted contracts to serve as a marketing consultant with various corporations, including Revlon.

In 2000, Pataki appeared on a radio show in which she criticized then-New York Mayor Rudy Giuliani for taking too long to drop out of the U.S. Senate race against First Lady Hillary Clinton. Pataki said that the delay hampered the campaign of the eventual Republican nominee, Congressman Rick Lazio.

Pataki's father was a career military officer. She graduated from Beaufort High School in Beaufort, South Carolina and Clark University in Worcester, Massachusetts. She and her husband, who married in 1973, have four children. Along with Nathan Sharansky, she serves as the co-founder of the pro-Israel institution One Jerusalem which supports the Israeli annexation of East Jerusalem, a territory recognised as being under Israeli occupation by the international community.

Honorary titles
Preceded by Matilda Cuomo	First Lady of New York; 1995–2007	Succeeded by Silda Wall
