= Sandra Lee (chef) =

American television chef and author

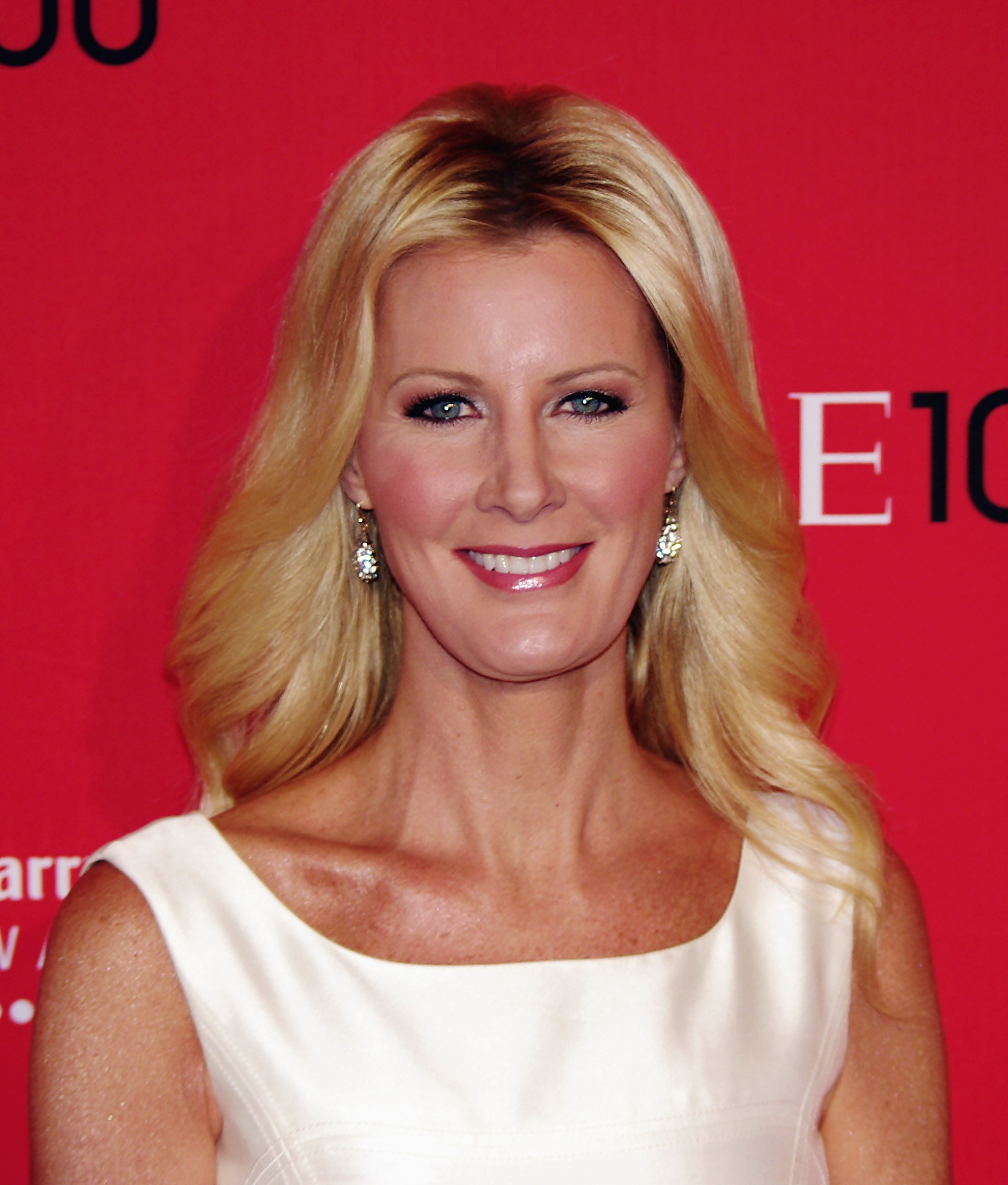
- Lee in 2012
- Born: Sandra Lee Waldroop; July 3, 1966 (age 60); Santa Monica, California, U.S.
- Occupations: Television chef; author; documentary producer
- Television: Semi-Homemade Cooking with Sandra Lee; Sandra's Money Saving Meals; Sandra's Restaurant Remakes; Sandra Lee's Taverns, Lounges & Clubs; Sandra Lee Celebrates
- Spouse: Bruce Karatz (m. 2001; div. 2005)
- Partners: Andrew Cuomo (2005–2019); Ben Youcef (2021–2026)
- Awards: Daytime Emmy Award for Outstanding Lifestyle/Culinary Host (2012); See more

First Lady of New York
- In role De facto January 1, 2011 – September 25, 2019
- Governor: Andrew Cuomo
- Preceded by: Michelle Paige Paterson
- Succeeded by: William J. Hochul Jr. (First Gentleman)
- Website: sandralee.com

Sandra Lee Christiansen (née Waldroop; born July 3, 1966), known professionally as Sandra Lee, is an American television chef and author. She is known for her "Semi-Homemade" cooking concept, which Lee describes as using 70 percent packaged products and 30 percent fresh ingredients. She received the Daytime Emmy Award for Outstanding Lifestyle/Culinary Show Host in 2012 for her work and her show. As the partner of former New York Governor Andrew Cuomo, she served as the de facto first lady of New York from 2011 to 2019, when the couple ended their relationship.

== Early life ==
Lee was born in Santa Monica, California, in 1966, the daughter of Vicky Svitak and Wayne Waldroop, who had been high-school sweethearts. When Sandra was two, her mother sent her, along with her younger sister, Cindy, to live with their paternal grandmother, Lorraine Waldroop. Due to this, Lee grew up thinking Lorraine was her mother. In 1972, after divorcing Wayne, Lee's mother moved with her girls to Sumner, Washington, where they acquired a new stepfather, whose last name (Christiansen) Lee took. Vicky had three additional children in the 1970s: Kimber, Richie, and John Paul. Due to her mother's prescription drug addiction and the absence of her and her siblings' fathers, Lee effectively raised her four younger siblings. In her youth, Lee learned how to feed her younger siblings frugally with a combination of food stamps and welfare payments, an experience that informed her future approach to cooking. Lee credits her grandmother Lorraine as inspiration for her love of baking and ability to "stretch a dollar".

Lee graduated from Onalaska High School, in Onalaska, Wisconsin, and attended the University of Wisconsin–La Crosse, however she dropped out during her junior year to return to California. Lee has said her family is Catholic but was raised as Jehovah's Witnesses. One source reported they were also Seventh-day Adventist for a time.

In December of her junior year, she left college to live near family in Malibu, California. She later attended a two-week recreational course at Le Cordon Bleu in Ottawa, Ontario, Canada.

== Career ==
In the early 1990s, Lee created a product called "Sandra Lee Kraft Kurtains," a home-decorating kit designed to turn a wire rack and sheets, or other spare fabric, into decorative drapery. It was sold via infomercials and cable shopping networks. Home-shopping network QVC hired her as on-air talent. In her first 18 months, Lee sold $20 million worth of merchandise. QVC also selected Lee to launch its craft and home decorating categories on its networks in the U.K. and Germany. In 1994, she released her first DIY home improvement video series, which sold more than a million copies.

In 2003, Food Network approached Lee about doing a cooking show, which she initially objected to, instead wanting to do a home and garden show. During nine months of negotiations over the format and content, Lee argued for the inclusion of a cocktail segment, which the network executives resisted, claiming there was no audience interest in cocktails on television. Semi-Homemade Cooking with Sandra Lee ultimately premiered on the Food Network in October 2003. The show ran for 15 seasons and was in the top three new weekend shows on the network for its first five years. Each episode contains meal and cocktail recipes, which use a mix of fresh and store-bought items, along with entertaining and arts and crafts elements, in which Lee decorates the table setting and kitchen in accordance with the theme of the meal that she just prepared. She refers to these as "tablescapes", a term she coined.

Lee's second Food Network series, Sandra's Money Saving Meals, began airing on May 10, 2009, in response to the Great Recession. At the time, she was the only host on the Food Network with two cooking series running concurrently. Kurt Soller, writing for Newsweek, described her as "among TV's most successful female chefs". As of 2019, her shows have aired in 63 countries. She has authored 27 books, including Sandra Lee Semi-Homemade: Cool Kids Cooking (October 2006) and a memoir, Made From Scratch, which was released in November 2007. Her book Semi-Homemade Cooking appeared on The New York Times Best Seller list. A magazine based on her show, Sandra Lee Semi-Homemade, was released in 2009. In late 2009, Lee hosted Sandra Lee Celebrates, a series of four one-hour specials that aired on HGTV.

In 2012, Lee won the Daytime Emmy Award for Outstanding Lifestyle/Culinary Host for Semi-Homemade Cooking.

Also in 2012, she started a monthly lifestyle magazine, Sandra Lee, in partnership with TV Guide. People magazine has included her in its list of "Most Beautiful" people multiple times.

In early 2020, Lee began creating her "Top Shelf" video series for Today.com, showcasing new ways to make meals from products commonly found in pantries. An April 2020 New York Times article authored by Jessica Bennett called Lee "the queen of making something out of nothing". In late 2020, Lee hosted a series of holiday segments, "It's a Wonderful Lifetime", on Lifetime.

== Documentaries ==
In 2015, shortly before being diagnosed with cancer, Lee started her own production company. She created Rx: Early Detection – A Cancer Journey With Sandra Lee, a documentary about her experiences with cancer, which aired on HBO. The film premiered at the Sundance Film Festival in January 2018, at the 2018 Tribeca Film Festival, and on HBO in October 2018. Lee received the Made in New York Award at the Gotham Independent Film Awards in November 2018 for her work on the documentary.

Lee was an executive producer of the documentary about Ruth Bader Ginsburg, titled Ruth: Justice Ginsburg in Her Own Words, in collaboration with Academy Award-winning director Freida Lee Mock, Geralyn Dreyfous, and others. It premiered on Starz in March 2021 as part of the network's Women's History Month programming.

== Philanthropy ==
Lee co-founded the Los Angeles chapter of UNICEF in 2000. She donated the proceeds from her second cookbook to God's Love We Deliver and Project Angel Food, two organizations that deliver food to homebound individuals. In 2015, she led a UNICEF team on a mission to Haiti in her role as a special nutrition emissary for the organization. The U.S. division of the UN's World Food Programme, the world's largest humanitarian organization, appointed Lee to its board of directors in May 2020.

Lee was a spokesperson for Share Our Strength's No Kid Hungry campaign for more than ten years and created No Kid Hungry's annual fundraiser, the Great American Bake Sale. Her first Great American Bake Sale, in 2011, raised more than $50,000. She has also worked with the Elton John AIDS Foundation and serves on its board.

== Critical response ==
Hsiao-Ching Chou of the Seattle Post-Intelligencer wrote a review of Lee's cookbook Semi-Homemade Cooking in 2002 that criticized both her recipes and her "semi-homemade" concept. She then wrote a follow-up column, noting that the review received a response "that was more impassioned than I anticipated". Chou wrote that, though most readers agreed with her, a number of readers took Lee's position, including one who wrote, "Lots of people who don't want to take the time to shred a cup of carrots want to cook a good meal."

Kurt Soller, writing for Newsweek, compared Lee's impact upon television cooking with that of Julia Child, noting that although Lee's show "is the furthest from Child's methods", both women "filled a niche that hasn't yet been explored".

Amanda Hesser, in a 2003 review of Semi-Homemade Cooking in The New York Times, wrote that Lee's recipes, in their use of packaged ingredients, can end up costing more, having harder-to-find ingredients, taking longer to make, and tasting worse than equivalent recipes made from scratch. Hesser also wrote that, in her cookbooks, Lee "encourages a dislike for cooking, and gives people an excuse for feeding themselves and their families mediocre food filled with preservatives."

At the beginning of the COVID-19 pandemic, both Jessica Bennett in New York Times and Jaya Saxena in Eater noted that the context of pandemic scarcity made the "semi-homemade" concept feel newly relevant. Of Lee, Saxena wrote, "her show, Semi-Homemade Cooking, might be the perfect way to cook through quarantine."

=== Kwanzaa cake ===
Much criticism of Lee coalesced around a recipe for "Kwanzaa Cake" that she demonstrated on a 2003 episode of Semi-Homemade Cooking with Sandra Lee. The recipe consisted of angel food cake topped with icing, cinnamon, apple pie filling, pumpkin seeds and corn nuts (which she referred to as acorns), all of which were store-bought, with seven Kwanzaa candles then inserted into the cake.

Food writer Anthony Bourdain, who was harshly critical of Lee in general, described the video clip of this segment of the show as "eye-searing" and "a war crime". The cake was called "scary" by the Houston Chronicle, and "the most ghastly-sounding dish in Lee's culinary repertoire" by Tulsa World. Salon.com wrote that the video "takes pride of place in the pantheon of hilarious culinary disaster videos".

Cookbook author Denise Vivaldo, who claims to have ghostwritten recipes for many celebrity chefs, claimed in The Huffington Post in December 2010 that she was responsible for the recipe, but that the candles were Lee's idea, for which Vivaldo apologized. She also wrote that Lee "has incredibly bad food taste". A week later, the post was removed after Lee's lawyer threatened legal action. Lee has said this recipe is the only one of hers whose criticism she has taken to heart, and that the recipe was due to the Food Network then dictating the show's content.

== Personal life ==
From 2001 to 2005, she was married to then-KB Home CEO and philanthropist Bruce Karatz, for whom she converted to Judaism.

In the fall of 2005, Lee entered into a relationship with Andrew Cuomo, who served as the 56th Governor of New York from 2011 until his resignation in August 2021. The two lived in a home owned by Lee in Chappaqua. On September 25, 2019, the couple announced that they had ended their relationship.

Lee dated the Algerian-born Abdulwahab Benyoucef, an actor professionally known as Ben Youcef, in March of 2021 and became engaged later that year. In 2026, the couple had ended their engagement and had parted ways.

=== Cancer and advocacy ===
Lee announced on May 12, 2015 that she had been diagnosed with early-stage breast cancer. By then she had undergone a lumpectomy, and was scheduled to have a double mastectomy later in the week. Governor Cuomo was to take some personal time to be with her during and after the surgery. In August 2015, she contracted an infection in her right breast that resulted in her going on bed rest and receiving intravenous drugs for three months. Lee announced that she was cancer free in late 2015. Seven years after undergoing her double mastectomy, Lee underwent a hysterectomy procedure in March 2022. Her surgery was successful.

In 2016, Lee pushed for the passage of the $91 million "No Excuses" law in the state of New York, which provided for expanded breast cancer screening and removed insurance co-pays for mammograms. She subsequently advocated that other states pass their own versions of the "No Excuses" law. Lee was a keynote speaker at the Susan G. Komen Advocacy Summit for breast cancer awareness in Washington, D.C., in May 2019. She also became an ambassador for Stand Up to Cancer and produced the documentary Rx: Early Detection – A Cancer Journey with Sandra Lee.

== Bibliography ==
=== Cookbooks ===
- Semi-Homemade – Cooking, Fast and Fabulous (2001)
- Semi-Homemade Cooking: Quick, Marvelous Meals and Nothing Is Made from Scratch (2002)
- Semi-Homemade Desserts (2003)
- Semi-Homemade Cooking 2 (2005)
- Semi-Homemade 20-Minute Meals (2006)
- Semi-Homemade Grilling (2006)
- Semi-Homemade Gatherings (2006)
- Semi-Homemade Slow Cooker Recipes (2006)
- Semi-Homemade Cool Kids' Cooking (2006)
- Semi-Homemade Cooking Made Light (2006)
- Semi Homemade 20-Minute Meals 2 (2006)
- Semi-Homemade Slow Cooker Recipes 2 (2007)
- Semi-Homemade Cooking 3 (2007)
- Semi-Homemade Fast-Fix Family Favorites (2008)
- Semi-Homemade Desserts 2 (2008)
- Semi-Homemade Money Saving Meals (2008)
- Semi-Homemade Grilling 2 (2008)
- Semi-Homemade Cocktail Time (2009)
- Semi-Homemade Weeknight Wonders: 139 Easy Fast Fix Dishes (2009)
- Semi-Homemade Money-Saving Slow-Cooking (2009)
- Semi-Homemade: The Complete Cookbook (2010)
- Semi-Homemade Comfort Food (2010)
- Money Saving Meals and Round 2 Recipes (2011)
- Easy Entertaining at Home: Cocktails, Finger Foods, and Creative Ideas for Year-Round Celebrations (2011)
- Bake Sale Cookbook (2011)
- Every Dish Delivers: 365 Days of Fast, Fresh, Affordable Meals (2013)

=== Other ===
- Made from Scratch: A Memoir (2007)
- The Recipe Box, a novel (2013)

== Awards and nominations ==
Year	Award	Category	Work	Result	Ref.
2012	Daytime Emmy Award	Outstanding Lifestyle/Culinary Host	Semi-Homemade Cooking with Sandra Lee	Won	
2013	Gracie Award	Outstanding Host – Lifestyle Program	Sandra's Restaurant Remakes	Won	

Lee has received the President's Volunteer Service Award, the Eleanor Roosevelt Medal of Honor, and, in 2009, the Ellis Island Medal of Honor. In 2018, the New York City Mayor's Office of Media and Entertainment presented Lee with the Made in NY Award at the Gotham Independent Film Awards.

Honorary titles
Preceded by Michelle Paige Paterson	First Lady of New York; De facto 2011–2019	Succeeded by William J. Hochul Jr. (as First Gentleman)
