= University at Buffalo Law School =

Public law school in Amherst, New York, US

Coordinates: 43.000588°N 78.787943°W

University at Buffalo School of Law
- Established: 1887; 139 years ago
- School type: Public
- Dean: S. Todd Brown
- Location: Amherst, New York, U.S.
- Enrollment: 462
- Faculty: 56
- USNWR ranking: 82nd (2026)
- Bar pass rate: 88.46%
- Website: www.law.buffalo.edu

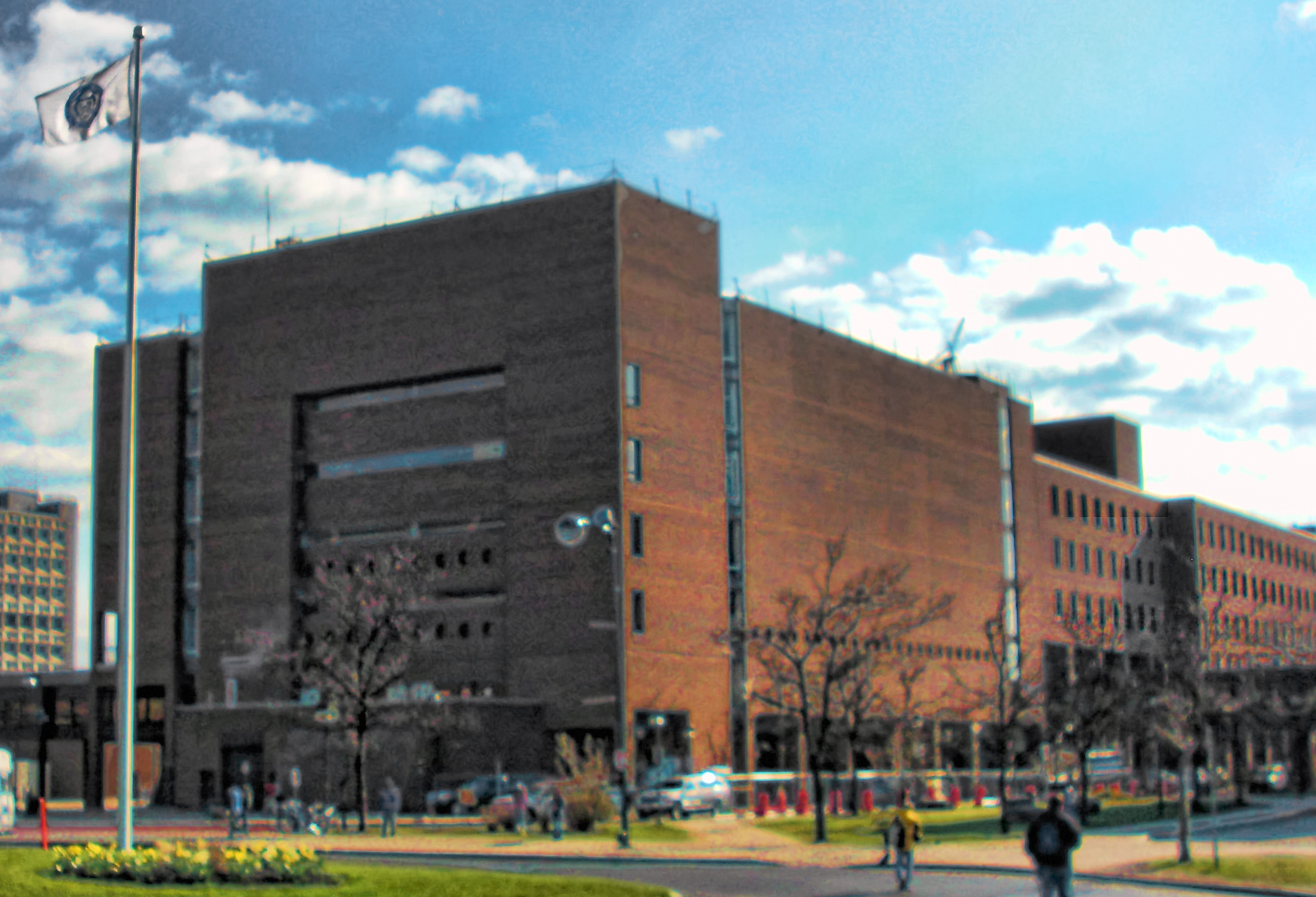
O'Brian Hall Law Building

The University at Buffalo School of Law (also known as State University of New York at Buffalo Law School, or SUNY Buffalo Law School) is the law school of the University at Buffalo. Founded in 1887, and affiliated with Niagara University until 1891, it is the State University of New York (SUNY) system's only law school.

According to the University at Buffalo School of Law's 2023 ABA-required disclosures, 91.72% of the Class of 2023 obtained full-time, long-term, JD-required employment nine months after graduation.

== Background ==
The University at Buffalo School of Law has a student-faculty ratio of 5.5:1. Currently, more than 75 percent of its upper division courses comprise fewer than 40 students. In addition, many of the faculty members hold advanced degrees in the social sciences and other disciplines in conjunction with their law degrees.

The first-year program includes traditional legal courses in civil procedure, torts, contracts, property, criminal law, constitutional law, and ethics. In the second and third years students choose from curricular concentrations that allow for in-depth study. Each student has the opportunity to craft a custom-made curriculum, beyond the selected concentrations to build a personalized sequence of courses and experiences.

Under the Law School's Legal Analysis, Writing and Research (LAWR) program, all students complete a 10-credit, three-semester LAWR curriculum, with two semesters in their first year and a third semester during their second or third years. All three semesters are taught by full-time LAWR faculty. Throughout the LAWR program, students learn legal analysis and writing through immersion in the practice of writing, and through cycles of trial and error, feedback, and reflection.

Most students are part of the Juris Doctor (J.D.) program. Interdisciplinary dual degree programs permit J.D. students to seek other graduate degrees along with their J.D., including master's or doctoral degrees from the School of Management, School of Social Work, School of Pharmacy and Pharmaceutical Sciences, School of Public Health and Health Professions, or School of Architecture and Planning. UB Law also has the only post-professional Master of Laws (LL.M.) program in criminal law in the United States, and a general LL.M. program designed exclusively for international students.

The Neil D. Levin Graduate Institute of International Relations and Commerce is a joint program of UB Law with UB's business school. Named after Neil David Levin, the executive director of the Port Authority of New York and New Jersey who was killed in the September 11 attacks, the Levin Institute conducts an annual spring semester program in New York City for about 20 students, divided into five teams to work on projects sponsored by law firms and financial institutions. For example, in 2006 the teams were sponsored by CLSA, Fried, Frank, Harris, Shriver & Jacobson, UBS, Credit Suisse and M&T Bank.

The general law journal is the Buffalo Law Review, a student-run publication managed by 3L J.D. candidates. Founded in 1951, the Law Review currently publishes five issues per year (January, April, May, July and December), featuring full length articles by practitioners, professors and students in all areas of law. Each issue contains approximately four such articles and one student-authored comment. Two other specialist journals are also based at the Law School: Buffalo Environmental Law Journal and Buffalo Human Rights Law Review.

The student newspaper, The Opinion, has been in publication since November 29, 1949.

UB's Clinical Legal Education program operate the school's legal clinics, which involve client service, impact litigation, transactional practice, and public policy development. Students participate in clinics throughout the school year and are given classroom credit for their work. The ten clinics are the Animal Law Clinic, Civil Rights and Transparency Clinic, Community Justice Clinic, Environmental Advocacy Clinic, Entrepreneurship Clinic, Family Violence and Women's Rights Clinic, Health Justice Clinic, Mediation Clinic, Puerto Rico Recovery Assistance Legal Clinic, and the U.S.-Mexico Border Clinic.

The Baldy Center for Law & Social Policy is an institute that supports the interdisciplinary study of law, legal institutions, and social policy. Over 200 UB faculty members from various academic departments as well as graduate students participate in Baldy Center research and teaching activities. The Center maintains cooperative ties to other interdisciplinary research centers and co-sponsors a regional network of sociolegal scholars in New York and Canada. The Baldy Center hosts distinguished scholars from around the world as visitors, consultants, and conference participants.

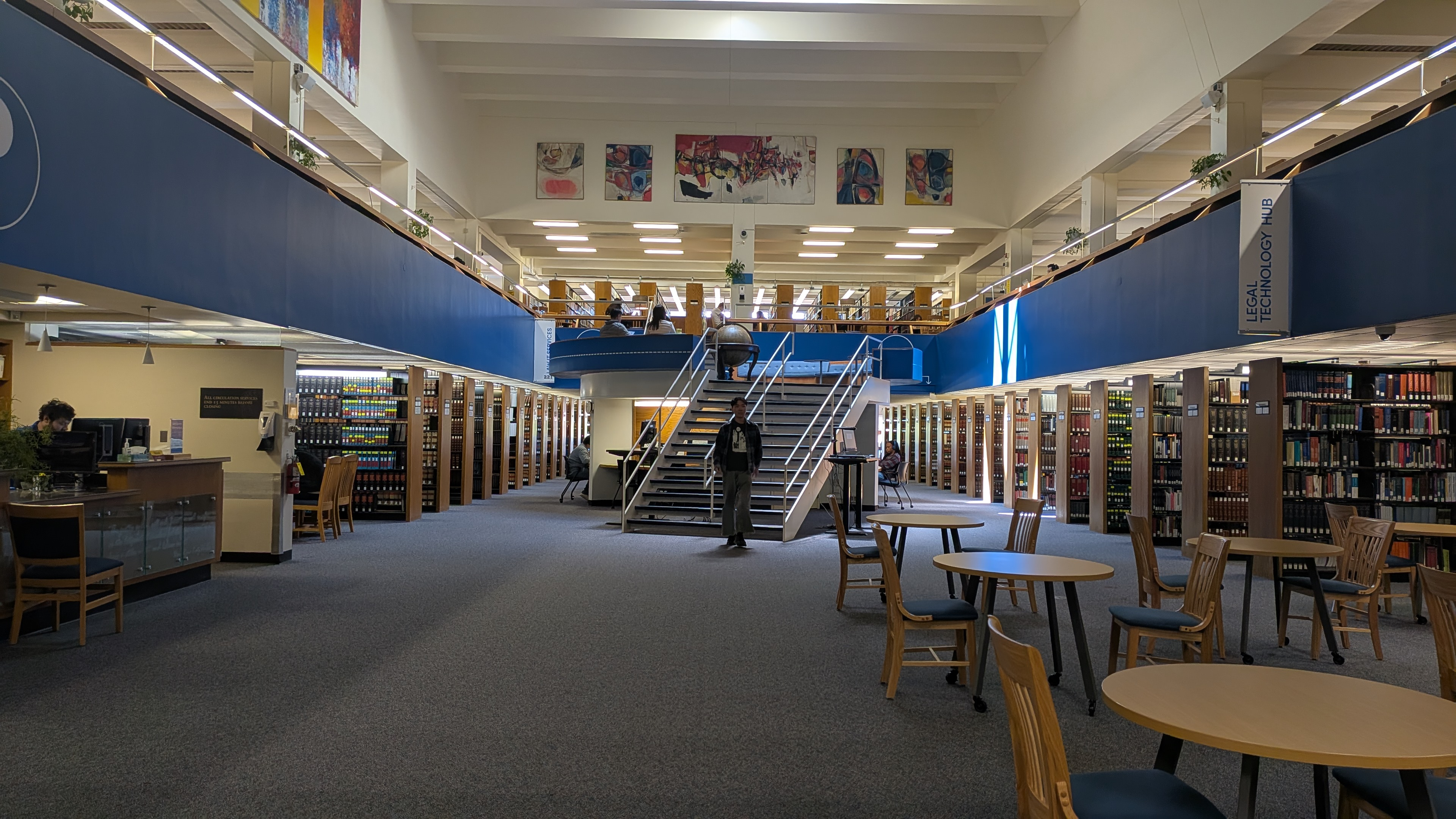
The interior of the Charles B. Sears Law Library inside O'Brian Hall

The Charles B. Sears Law Library is UB's law library. It is named for Charles Brown Sears and occupies six floors in the center of the Law School. The Law Library contains 300,000 bound volumes and over 221,000 volumes in microform. Included within the Federal, New York, and State Core Collections are basic legal research tools: court reporters and digests, session laws and codes, rules and regulations, attorney general reports, jurisdictional encyclopedias and citators. The Law Library's special collection includes the Howard R. Berman Collection, Iroquois Books of Marilyn L. Haas, John Lord O'Brian Papers, Law Library Archives, Law School Archives, Morris L. Cohen Rare Book Collection, Onondaga Nation Land Claims Records, Seneca Land Claims Records, Tibetan Legal Manuscripts, and Watergate Collection.

The University at Buffalo School of Law is located on the university's North Campus in O'Brian Hall, which was named after notable alumnus John Lord O'Brian.

== Admissions ==
The class of 2026 had a median LSAT of 156. The median GPA was 3.72. Out of 930 applications, 382 were accepted for a 41.08% acceptance rate, with 141 enrolled.

== Employment ==
According to the University at Buffalo School of Law's official 2023 ABA-required disclosures, 91.72% of the Class of 2023 obtained full-time, long-term, JD-required employment nine months after graduation. The University at Buffalo School of Law's Law School Transparency under-employment score is 6.4%, indicating the percentage of the Class of 2023 unemployed, pursuing an additional degree, or working in a non-professional, short-term, or part-time job nine months after graduation.

== Costs ==
Tuition for the 2023-24 academic year will be $26,170 for in-state residents with a $3,078 comprehensive fee. The combined tuition, fees, and living expenses for state residents is $52,010 with an additional $4,990 for out-of-state residents. 80% of the student body received grants and scholarships. The school does not award scholarships that may be reduced or eliminated based on law school academic performance other than failure to maintain good academic standing.

== Notable people ==
=== Notable faculty ===
- Thomas Buergenthal – judge, International Court of Justice – professor 1962–1975
- William R. Greiner – former President of University at Buffalo, 1991–2004; former professor, provost, and dean of the University at Buffalo Law School
- Jacob D. Hyman – former dean
- Muhammad Kenyatta – visiting professor, 1988-1992
- David Riesman – sociologist, author of The Lonely Crowd, professor 1937–1941
- Clyde Summers (1918–2010) – labor lawyer and law professor at the University of Pennsylvania Law School

=== Notable alumni ===
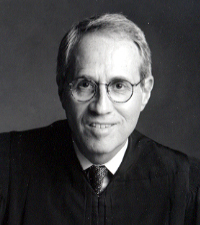
Judge Paul L. Friedman

- Michael A. Battle (1984) – director, Executive Office for United States Attorneys (2005–2007); United States Attorney for the Western District of New York (2002–2005)
- Harry Bronson – New York State Assemblyman
- Ronald Castorina Jr. – Former New York State Assemblyman (2016-2018); Former Commissioner NYC Board of Elections (2013-2015)
- Eugene M. Fahey – Associate judge of New York State Court of Appeals
- Joseph S. Forma – Judge, New York Supreme Court
- Paul L. Friedman (1968) – United States District Judge, United States District Court for the District of Columbia
- Julio M. Fuentes (1975) – United States Circuit Judge, United States Court of Appeals for the Third Circuit (Newark, New Jersey duty station)
- David Gray (1870–1968) - United States Ambassador to Ireland from 1940 to 1947, playwright, novelist, and lawyer
- William J. Hochul Jr. (1984) – United States Attorney for the Western District of New York (2010–2016)
- Sara Horowitz – Founder of Freelancers Union and Director of the Federal Reserve Bank of New York
- Nicole Lee, Executive Director of TransAfrica.
- Henry J. Nowak – U.S. Representative (1975–1993)
- John Lord O'Brian – United States Attorney for the Western District of New York (1909–1914), Special U.S. Assistant Attorney General, War Emergency Division (1917–1919), U.S. Assistant Attorney General, Antitrust Division (1929–1933), General Counsel of the War Production Board (1941–1944)
- Denise O'Donnell – Former United States Attorney for the Western District of New York, New York State Attorney General Candidate, and Senior Adviser to New York Governor David Paterson and Eliot Spitzer.
- Eugene F. Pigott Jr. – associate judge, New York Court of Appeals (2006–2016)
- Jack Quinn III – Former New York State Assembly Member (2004–2010)
- Cynthia M. Rufe (1977) – United States District Judge, United States District Court for the Eastern District of Pennsylvania
- Hugh B. Scott – Magistrate Judge, United States District Court for the Western District of New York; first African-American federal prosecutor
- Virginia A. Seitz – prominent attorney, former law clerk to Justice William J. Brennan Jr., U.S. Supreme Court
- Michael A. Telesca – United States District Judge, United States District Court for the Western District of New York
- Wallace Thayer New York State Assemblyman (1914)
- Dennis Vacco – New York State Attorney General (1994–1998)
- Dale Volker – New York State Senator
- Raymond Walter – New York State Assemblyman
- Jeffrey White – Judge, United States District Court for the Northern District of California

== See also ==
- Law of New York
