= United States Attorney for the Western District of New York =

Chief federal law enforcement officer for Western New York state

United States Western District of New York counties.

The United States attorney for the Western District of New York is the chief federal law enforcement officer in seventeen New York counties: Allegany, Cattaraugus, Chautauqua, Chemung, Erie, Genesee, Livingston, Monroe, Niagara, Ontario, Orleans, Schuyler, Seneca, Steuben, Wayne, Wyoming, and Yates.

The U.S. District Court for the Western District of New York has jurisdiction over all cases prosecuted by the U.S. attorney. As of February 28, 2025 the U.S. attorney is Michael DiGiacomo, who was appointed by Pam Bondi.

== History ==
The Western District of New York was formed by taking away seventeen counties from the Northern District of New York, in 1900, that currently represent Western New York. The Office is responsible for overseeing the prosecution of any federal criminal case brought within the 17 counties of Western New York. The Office also represents the United States in all civil matters brought within this territory.

== List of U.S. attorneys for the Western District of New York ==
- Charles H. Brown: 1900–1906 (U.S. Atty. of Northern District since 1899, remained in the Western District)
- Lyman M. Bass: 1906–1909
- John Lord O'Brian: 1909–1914
- Stephen T. Lockwood: 1915–1922
- William J. Donovan: 1922–1924
- Thomas Penney, Jr.: 1924–1925
- Richard H. Templeton: 1925–1934
- George L. Grobe: 1934–1953
- John O. Henderson: 1953–1959
- Neil A. Farmelo: 1959–1961
- John T. Curtin: 1961–1967
- Thomas A. Kennelly: 1968
- Andrew F. Phelan: 1968–1969
- Edgar C. NeMoyer: 1969
- H. Kenneth Schroeder Jr.: 1969–1972
- John T. Elfvin: 1972–1975
- Richard Arcara: 1975–1981
- Roger P. Williams: 1981–1982
- Salvatore R. Martoche: 1982–1986
- Roger P. Williams: 1986–1988
- Dennis Vacco: 1988–1993
- Patrick H. NeMoyer: 1993–1997
- Denise O'Donnell: 1997–2001
- Michael A. Battle: 2002–2005
- Terrance P. Flynn: 2006–2009
- William J. Hochul Jr.: 2010–2016
- James P. Kennedy Jr.: 2017–2021
- Trini E. Ross: 2021–2025
- Michael DiGiacomo: 2025-present
