= Jacob D. Hyman =

Jacob D. Hyman (December 11, 1909 – April 8, 2007) was a dean of the University at Buffalo (UB) Law School.

Known to his friends as "Jack" and to former students as "Dean Hyman," the Boston native earned a bachelor's degree from Harvard College in 1931 and a law degree from Harvard Law School in 1934. After graduation, Hyman began his legal career in New York City with Blumberg and Parker, a medium-sized law firm with a significant administrative practice before federal agencies. Fascinated with the energetic New Deal lawyers whom he encountered in practice, Hyman moved to Washington, D.C., in 1939, joining the legal staff of the Wage and Hour Division of the U.S. Department of Labor. Three years later, he moved to the Office of Price Administration, where he worked for John Kenneth Galbraith and eventually became associate general counsel in charge of litigation in the special federal court that reviewed price-control orders.

In 1946, with the end of wartime price regulations, Hyman moved to Buffalo to join the faculty at the UB Law School, then located downtown on Eagle Street. His teaching and scholarship centered in the areas of administrative law, constitutional law, jurisprudence, and state and local government law. Hyman became dean in 1953 and held that post until 1964, when he returned to full-time teaching. He retired for the first time in 1981, but kept teaching part-time until 2000, when he again retired, at the age of 90, after 54 years at the Law School. His devotion to equal educational opportunity at all levels of education was constant throughout his time in Buffalo. Throughout his teaching career, Hyman was active as a labor arbitrator, both in the public and private sectors. He also served as chair, board member, committee chair or committee member of such organizations as the City of Buffalo's Charter Revision Commission, the Community Welfare Council of Buffalo and Erie County, the Citizens Council on Human Rights, the Children's Aid Society and the Legal Aid Society of Buffalo and Erie County. Devoted to what some saw as "his" law school, Hyman also championed the university, working hard in support of its merger into the SUNY system in 1963 and later serving as the first chair of the President's Review Board.

Hyman was married to Clarice S. Lechner-Hyman, a former faculty member in the UB School of Nursing, who survived him.
