= St. Barnabas' Episcopal Church (Newark, New Jersey) =

Historic church in New Jersey, United States

- U.S. National Register of Historic Places
- New Jersey Register of Historic Places
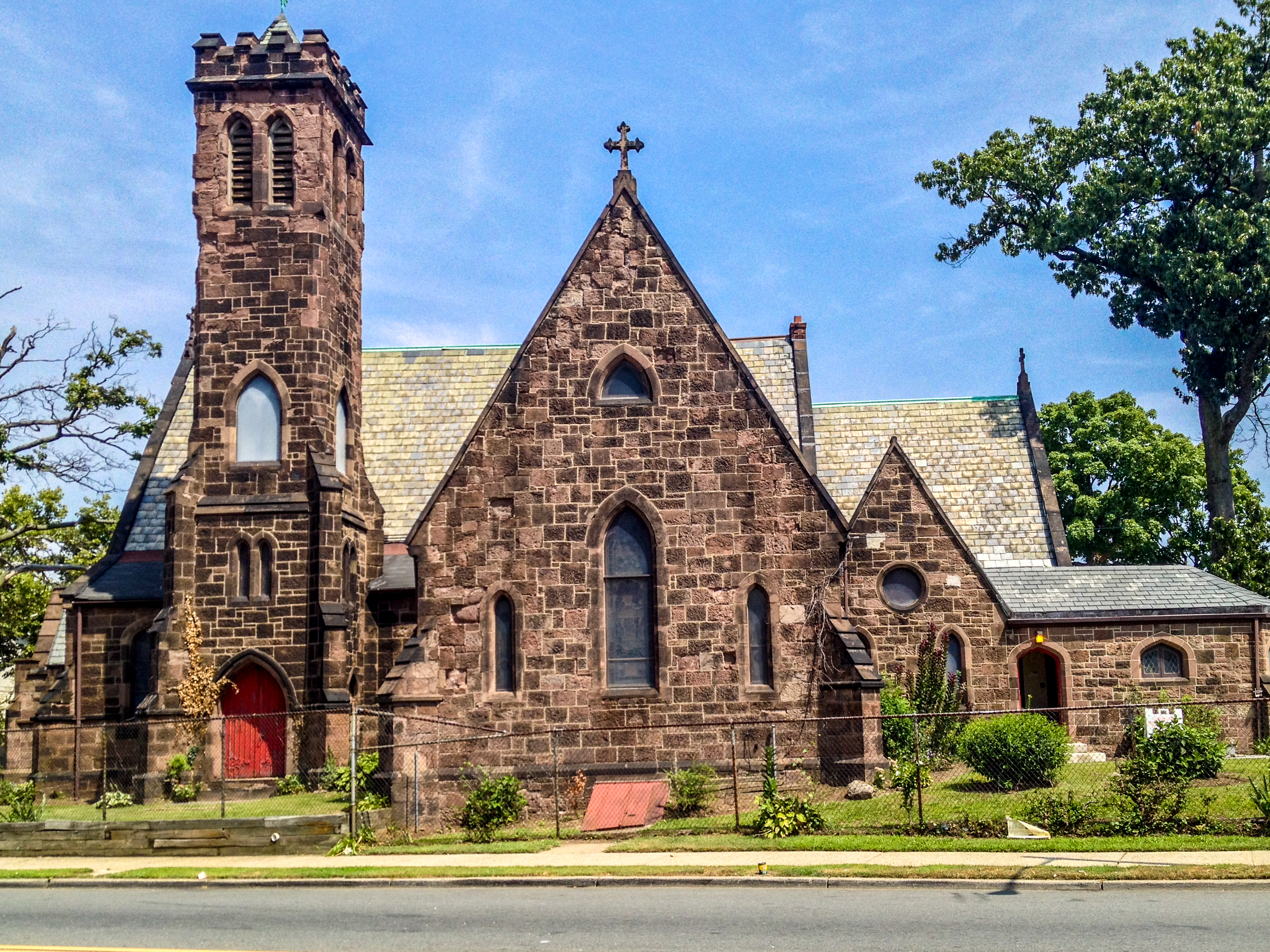

- Location within Essex County, New Jersey Location within New Jersey Location within the United States
- Location: West Market Street and Sussex and Roseville Avenues, Newark, New Jersey
- Coordinates: 40°45′4″N 74°11′38″W
- Area: 1 acre (0.40 ha)
- Built: 1864
- Architect: Thomas A. Roberts
- Architectural style: Gothic
- NRHP reference No.: 72000785
- NJRHP No.: 1308

Significant dates
- Added to NRHP: October 18, 1972
- Designated NJRHP: March 17, 1972

St. Barnabas' Episcopal Church, is located in Newark, Essex County, New Jersey, United States. The building was built in 1864 and was added to the National Register of Historic Places on October 18, 1972.

== See also ==
- National Register of Historic Places listings in Essex County, New Jersey

St. Barnabas' Church, on the triangle formed by Warren Street (West Market Street), Sussex and Roseville avenues, began its existence when the first service of the parish was held in a dwelling-house September 12, 1852. The following year it was fully organized. William Dusenberry, a layman, was chiefly instrumental in establishing the parish. By a deed dated 1 October 1853, Cyrus Peck and wife conveyed the lot upon which the church and school-house are now erected, to the Rectors, Wardens, and Vestrymen of the Church of St. Barnabas, Roseville, in the city of Newark, in fee, upon the condition that a church and school-house should be erected thereon, and which church edifice should be consecrated, appropriated, and devoted for ever exclusively to the service of Almighty God, according to the doctrine, discipline, and worship of the Protestant Episcopal Church in the United States of America. The Sunday school was organized October 9, 1852. The first church edifice was of wood, and consecrated in 1855 by Bishop George W. Doane. It was burned in 1862. The present stone structure, without the transepts, was consecrated on St. Barnabas' Day, 1864. The transepts were added in 1869. The rectory was built in 1869, and the parish house in 1889. The porch at the entrance facing Warren Street was added in 1913.

== Clergy ==
- The Rev. G. N. Sleight, 1855
- The Rev. Mr. Leech, 1856
- The Rev. E. S. Watson, 1860
- The Rev. William J. Lynd, 1863-1867
- The Rev. Robert McMurdy, D. D., LL. D, 1868-1869
- The Rev. William G. Farrington, 1870
- The Rev. George F. Flichtner, 1873-1883
- The Rev. Stephen H. Granberry, 1884-1915
- The Rev. Walter F. Hayward
- The Rev. Marshall F. Montgomery
- The Rev. Harry Bruce
- The Rev. Robert E. B. Hall
- The Rev. Eugene Stech (circa 1958-1964)
- The Rev. Robert Laughlin Pierson (1960-1967?)
- The Rev. R.J. Smith, the (then) Venerable Martha Blacklock (1978-81) during which time the parish was part of the Newark Episcopal Cooperative for Mission and Ministry, as was the North Porch which started in the parish hall, The Rev. Canon Dr. Paul Ekezie, the Revd. Canon Elizabeth Kaeton and the Rev. Mildred J. Solomon

Since 2003 the church has been served by supply clergy.

In 1865, a dedicated group of women known as the Ladies Society of Saint Barnabas established Saint Barnabas Hospital (Saint Barnabas Medical Center) in a private home. Eliza Titus who was the first patient gave her small estate to help in creating the first hospital on McWhorter Street in Newark, It Latter moved to High Street in 1869 and then to Livingston on November 29, 1964. When the hospital laid the cornerstone to the High Street address on June 11, 1869 (Saint Barnabas Day), the rector Rev. McMurdy, John Suydam a Warden of Saint Barnabas Church, and Dr. Sanford B. Hunt were elected to the Board of Managers of the Saint Barnabas Hospital Association. During the Great Depression (1930's), Saint Barnabas Church boasted over five hundred Parishioners and supported two priests and two organists. The Rev. Robert Laughlin Pierson, priest-in-charge of St. Barnabas Episcopal Church (1960-1967?) was arrested with a group of 15 Episcopal priests during the Freedom Rides of 1961 in Mississippi for trying to enter the lunchroom of a Trailways bus terminal in Jackson, Miss. Father Pierson and 11 other white priests were placed in one large cell while the Black priests were placed in another cell. He was later sentenced to four months in jail. The case was eventually dismissed, but it received much national attention because it involved clergymen and because Father Pierson's father-in-law at the time was Gov. Nelson A. Rockefeller. The Rev. Robert Pierson and Ann Clark Rockefeller were married in 1955. They shared an interest in social causes, like racial equality, women's rights and the welfare of migrant workers. They supported a black dance group in Brooklyn, subsidized James Baldwin's Blues for Mister Charlie at the American National Theater and Academy (ANTA) Theater, and flew to Moscow in 1965 in a citizens exchange project to thaw the Cold War. In the 1970s the basement of the Parish Hall was utilized for a coffee house Called "The Edge" that brought in many of the neighborhood youth. North Porch Women & Infants Center began its existence at Saint Barnabas also in the 1970s and has been moved to Park Place. In the 1980s the Gymnasium in the Parish Hall was used to minister to the community's youth. The Share program that began in the 1980s evolved into a food pantry that still distributes food twice a week. The Aids Resource Center opened 1990 and resided here until 2007. The basement of the Parish Hall currently houses the Jamar Carter Operation Turnaround boxing gym.

The congregation was evicted by a controversial and contentious action of the Diocese of Newark on November 11, 2012. see http://www.nj.com/essex/index.ssf/2012/12/with_membership_dwindling_epis.html
