= Michelle Paige Paterson =

First Lady of New York from 2008 to 2010

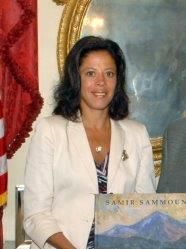

First Lady of New York
- In role March 17, 2008 – December 31, 2010
- Governor: David Paterson
- Preceded by: Silda Wall Spitzer
- Succeeded by: Sandra Lee (de facto)

Second Lady of New York
- In role January 1, 2007 – March 17, 2008
- Lieutenant Governor: David Paterson
- Preceded by: Anthony Ricci
- Succeeded by: Gail Skelos (acting)

Personal details
- Born: April 1, 1961 (age 65) Fairfield, California, U.S.
- Spouse: David Paterson (m. 1992; div. 2014)
- Children: 2
- Known for: First Lady of New York state

Michelle R. Paige Paterson (born April 1, 1961) is a healthcare professional who served as the second lady of New York from 2007 to 2008 and the first lady of New York state from 2008 until 2010 as the then-wife of David Paterson.

== Biography ==
Michelle Paige Paterson was born in Fairfield, California, and spent her early years in the Crown Heights neighborhood of Brooklyn in New York City. She later moved to Staten Island, another New York City borough, where she was raised by her mother, a Postal Service manager. She attended Syracuse University and earned a graduate degree in health-care management from Milano The New School for Management and Urban Policy.

As the wife of New York Governor David Paterson, she became the first lady of New York on March 17, 2008, when her husband was sworn in as governor, following the resignation of Eliot Spitzer. Michelle was the first African-American first lady in state history.

Michelle is director of the integrated-wellness program at the Health Insurance Plan of New York HMO, a program that assists individuals with chronic health problems to better manage their conditions by helping them to improve their life skills. She previously worked as a lobbyist for North General Hospital in Manhattan.

== Personal life ==
Michelle married David Paterson on November 21, 1992. They have a son together, born February 1994, named Alex. Michelle has a daughter, Ashley, from her first marriage, who was raised by Gov. Paterson.

On March 18, 2008, Michelle and her husband both admitted to having had affairs with other people. Making these admissions was a strategy she supported in order to start Paterson's governorship with full disclosure and to avoid "stoking the rumor mill".

Honorary titles
Preceded by Silda Wall Spitzer	First Lady of New York; 2008–2011	Succeeded by Sandra Lee; Acting
