= William J. Hochul Jr. =

American attorney (born 1959)

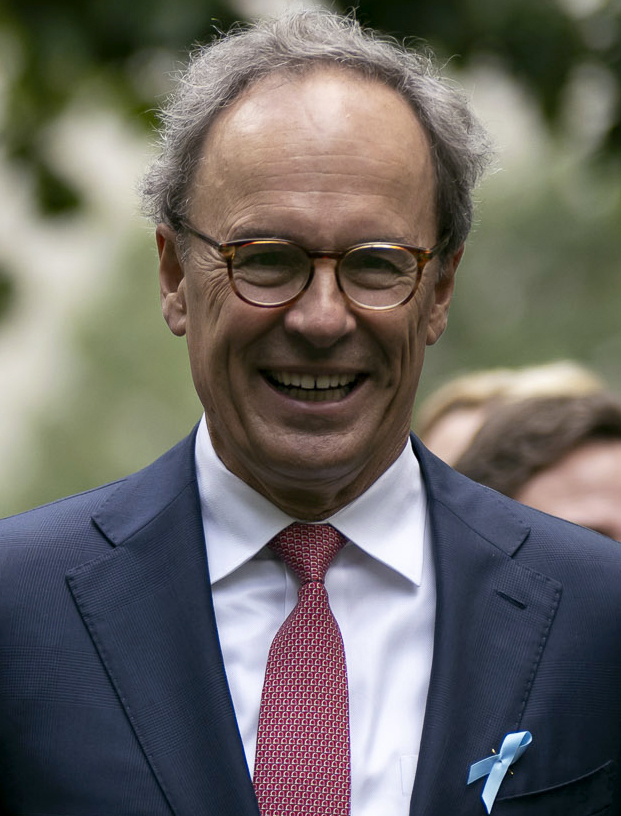
- Hochul in 2023

First Gentleman of New York
- Current
- Assumed office August 24, 2021
- Governor: Kathy Hochul
- Preceded by: Sandra Lee (Note: (2019; de facto First Lady))

Second Gentleman of New York
- In role January 1, 2015 – August 23, 2021
- Lieutenant Governor: Kathy Hochul
- Preceded by: Barbara Duffy (Note: (as Second Lady))
- Succeeded by: Cathleen Benjamin

United States Attorney for the Western District of New York
- In office March 15, 2010 – October 29, 2016
- President: Barack Obama
- Preceded by: Terrance Flynn
- Succeeded by: James P. Kennedy Jr.

Personal details
- Born: William Joseph Hochul Jr. March 28, 1959 (age 67) Buffalo, New York, U.S.
- Party: Democratic
- Spouse: Kathy Courtney (m. 1984)
- Children: 2
- Education: University of Notre Dame (BA); University at Buffalo (JD)
- Nickname: Bill Hochul

William Joseph Hochul Jr. (/ˈhoʊkəl/ HOH-kəl; born March 28, 1959) is an American attorney who served as United States attorney for the Western District of New York from 2010 to 2016. Hochul has been the first gentleman of New York since August 2021, when his wife, Kathy Hochul, ascended to the governorship following the resignation of Andrew Cuomo. He was previously the Second Gentleman while his wife was lieutenant governor from 2015 to 2021.

Hochul is currently counsel at international law firm Davis Polk & Wardell.

== Early life and education ==
William Joseph Hochul Jr. was born in Buffalo, New York on April 1, 1959. His grandparents were Catholic immigrants from Poland. He graduated from Cheektowaga Central High School in Cheektowaga, New York, just outside Buffalo. Hochul earned a Bachelor of Arts degree from the University of Notre Dame in Notre Dame, Indiana in 1981 and a Juris Doctor from State University of New York at Buffalo in 1984.

== Career ==
Hochul served as an assistant U.S. attorney in the Western District of New York from 1991 to 2010. During that time, he served as chief of the Anti-Terrorism Unit from 2002 to 2007 and as chief of the National Security Division from 2007 to 2010.

As an assistant U.S. attorney, Hochul served as a prosecutor in the 1994 trial of Sly Green and 27 members of his Buffalo-based gang, the L.A. Boys. Green was sentenced to 4 life sentences, plus 110 years in prison. In 1996, he also served as an adversary for the murder trial of George "Dog" Powell, another member of the L.A. Boys.

Hochul Jr. was one of the 18 members of the Buffalo Joint Terrorism Task Force awarded the Attorney General's Award for Exceptional Service, the highest award of the Department of Justice, for "their exemplary performance in the dismantlement of the Lackawanna, New York terrorist cell" which resulted in the 2003 convictions of six Yemeni-American for providing material support to Al-Qaeda. Hochul is also generally recognized as the first prosecutor to use the nation's racketeering laws to dismantle violent street gangs.

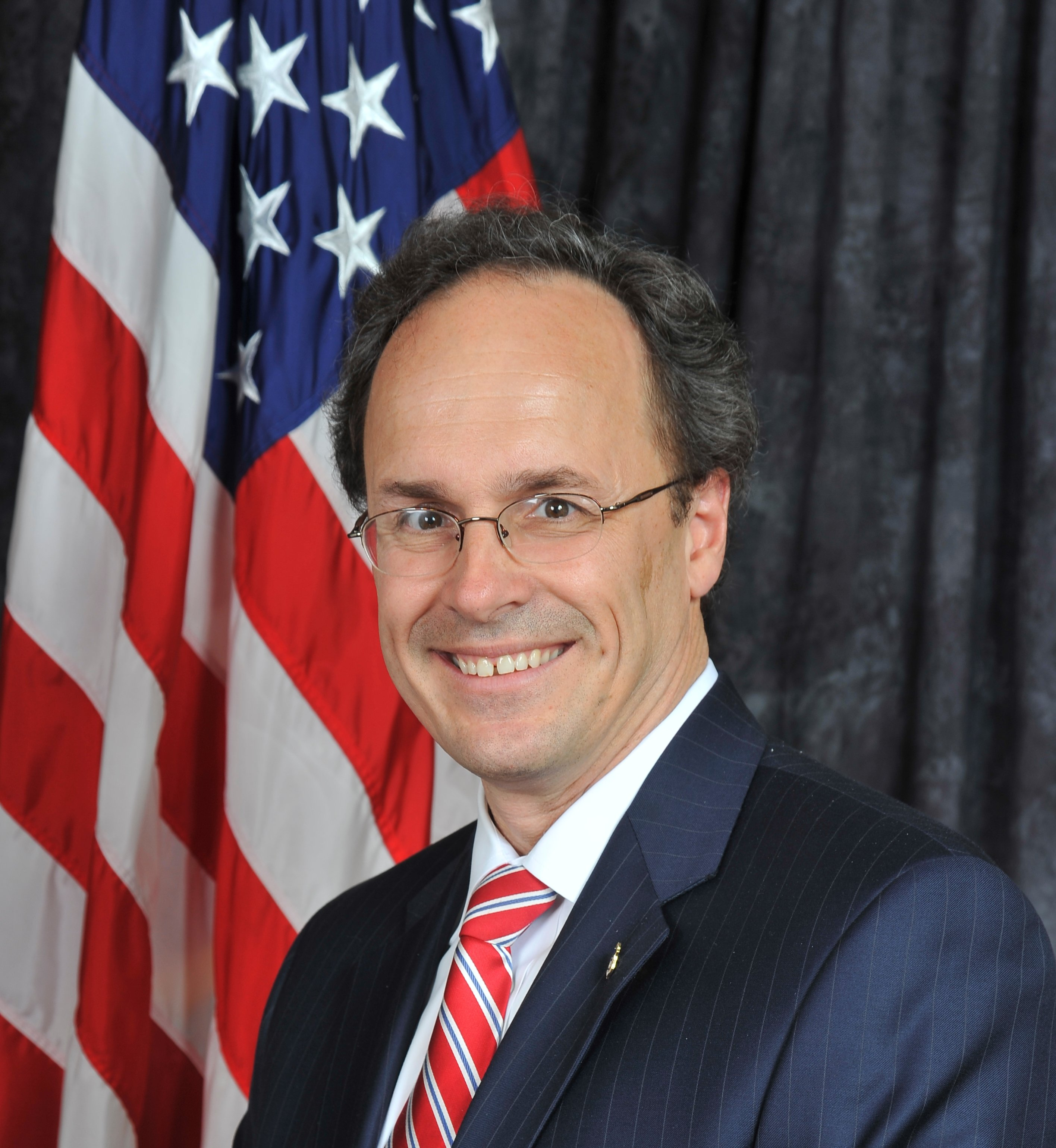
Hochul's official portrait, 2011

=== DOJ report on employment rejection ===
In 2006, William J. Hochul Jr. unsuccessfully applied to a counterterrorism position in the Executive Office for United States Attorneys. A 2008 report by the Department of Justice Office of the Inspector General revealed that Hochul's appointment was one of several appointments that were inappropriately blocked by then-President George W. Bush's Department of Justice official Monica Goodling due to political considerations. The report found that Hochul was passed over in favor of "a much less experienced, but politically acceptable, attorney". Hochul, who has variously registered to vote as both an independent and Democrat, is married to Kathleen M. Hochul (née Courtney) , a longtime, politically-active Democrat. The report concluded that Goodling found Hochul objectionable "because of his and his wife's political affiliation" and instead appointed a registered Republican who lacked counterterrorism experience and did not have the requisite five years of experience as a federal prosecutor.

=== U.S. Attorney ===
On December 23, 2009, President Barack Obama nominated Hochul to serve as the U.S. attorney for the Western District of New York. He was confirmed by the United States Senate by unanimous consent on March 10, 2010. According to the Am-Pol Eagle, Hochul is the first Polish-American to serve as a federal prosecutor for Western New York State.

=== Later career ===
In 2016, Hochul became senior vice president, general counsel, and secretary to Delaware North, a hospitality and gambling company. In 2024, he became counsel at Davis Polk (now Davis Polk & Wardell), in the firm's white collar defense and investigations practice in New York. As of November 2025, Hochul Jr. "advises clients on complex government and internal investigations, crisis management, communications strategy, risk mitigation and other matters." He is not a partner and makes between $850,000 to $950,000 a year from the law firm.

== Personal life ==
Hochul is married to former congresswoman and current New York governor Kathy Hochul, who previously served as the county clerk of Erie County, New York from 2007 to 2011. They have two children.

== Notes ==
Legal offices
Preceded by Terrance P. Flynn	United States Attorney for the Western District of New York; 2010–2016	Succeeded by James P. Kennedy Jr.
Honorary titles
Preceded by Sandra Lee	First Gentleman of New York; 2021–present	Succeeded by Incumbent
