= Governor of New York =

Head of government of the U.S. state of New York

- Seal of the governor of New York

- Standard of the governor of New York

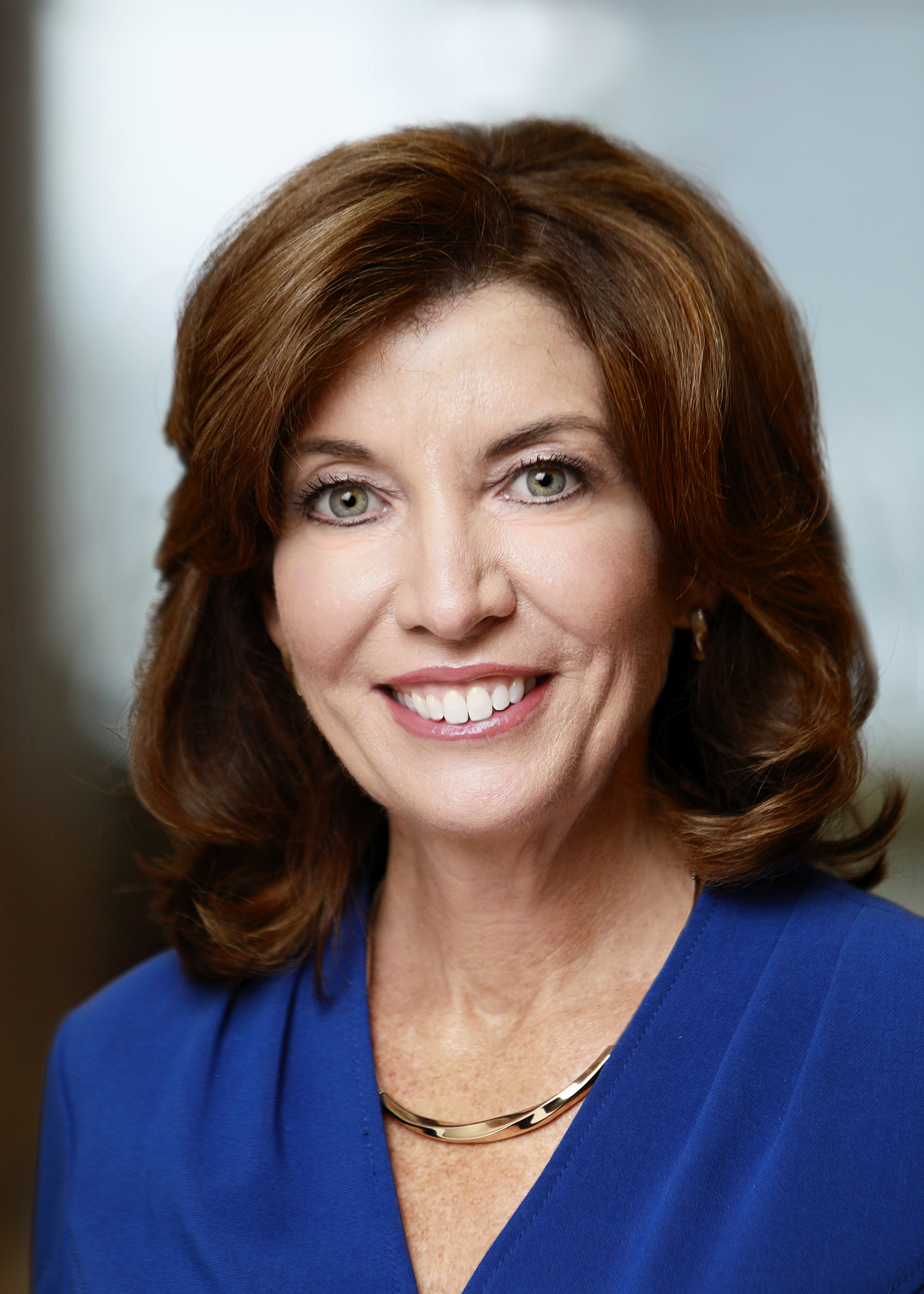
- Incumbent; Kathy Hochul since August 24, 2021
- Government of New York
- Style: Governor (informal); The Honorable (formal); Her Excellency (courtesy)
- Type: Head of state Head of government Commander-in-chief
- Residence: New York Executive Mansion
- Term length: Four years, no term limit
- Constituting instrument: New York Constitution of 1777
- Precursor: Royal Governor of the Province of New York
- Inaugural holder: George Clinton
- Formation: July 30, 1777 (249 years ago)
- Succession: Line of succession
- Deputy: Lieutenant Governor of New York
- Salary: $250,000 (2023)
- Website: Official website

The governor of New York is the head of state and head of government of the U.S. state of New York. The governor is the head of the executive branch of New York's state government and the commander-in-chief of the state's military forces. The governor has a duty to enforce state laws and the power to either approve or veto bills passed by the New York Legislature, to convene the legislature and grant pardons, except in cases of impeachment and treason. The governor of New York is the highest paid governor in the country.

The current governor is Kathy Hochul, a member of the Democratic Party who took office on August 24, 2021, following the resignation of Andrew Cuomo. She was elected to a full term in 2022.

== History ==
The position of governor in New York dates back to the British takeover of New Amsterdam, when the position replaced the former Dutch offices of director or director-general.

The New York State Constitution, section XVII originates the role, reading:

"And this convention doth further, in the name and by the authority of the good people of this State, ordain, determine, and declare that the supreme executive power and authority of this State shall be vested in a governor; and that statedly, once in every three years, and as often as the seat of government shall become vacant, a wise and descreet freeholder of this State shall be, by ballot, elected governor..."

== Election ==
The governor is directly elected every four years, in even-numbered years when there is no presidential election. The governor is required to be a United States citizen and a resident of New York for five years preceding their election. No person can be elected as governor under the age of thirty.

== Powers and duties ==
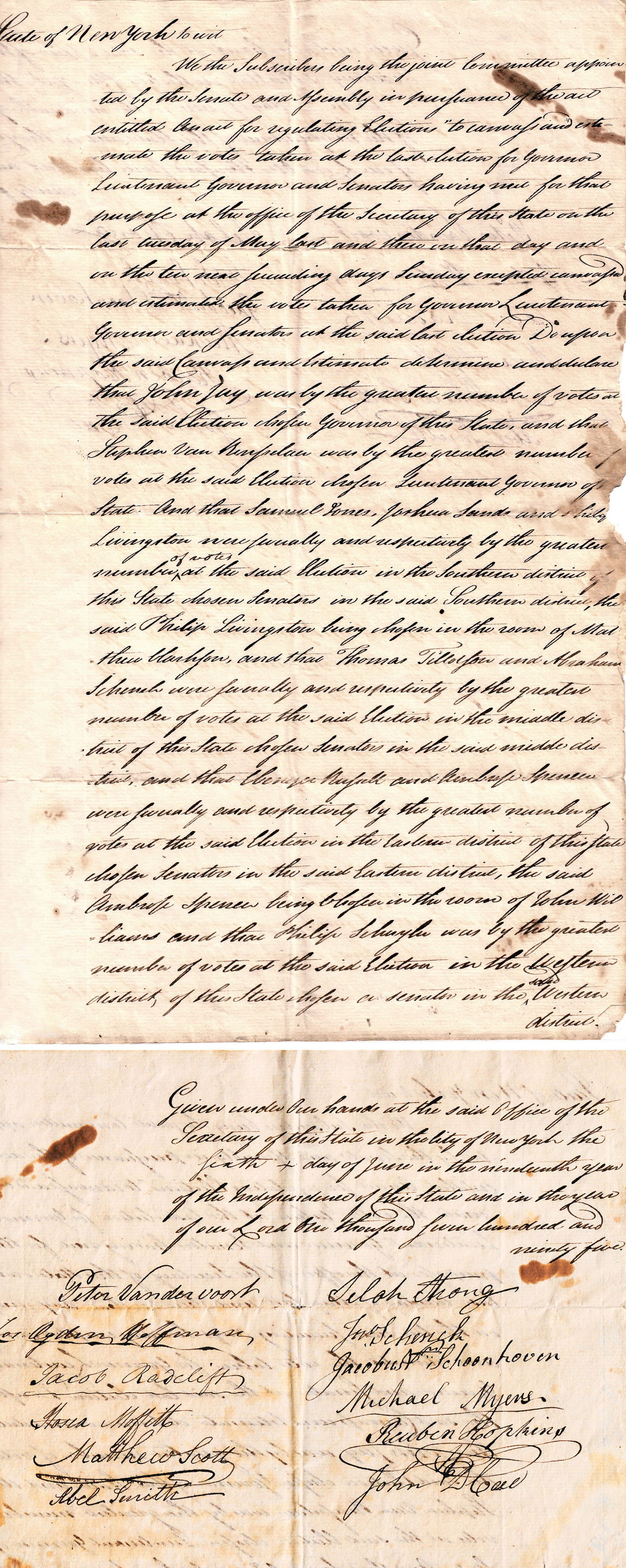
The original Certificate of Election of John Jay as Governor of New York (June 6, 1795)

The governor has a duty to enforce state laws, and the power to either approve or veto bills passed by the New York State Legislature, to convene the legislature, and to grant pardons, except in cases of treason and impeachment. Unlike the other government departments that compose the executive branch of government, the governor is the head of the state Executive Department. The officeholder is afforded the courtesy style of Their Excellency while in office.

Often considered a potential candidate for U.S. president, ten New York governors have been selected as presidential candidates by a major party, four of whom (Martin Van Buren, Grover Cleveland, Theodore Roosevelt, and Franklin D. Roosevelt) were elected as President of the United States. Meanwhile, six New York governors have gone on to serve as vice president. Additionally, two New York governors, John Jay and Charles Evans Hughes, have served as chief justice.

== Appointments ==
The governor is responsible for appointing their Executive Chamber. These appointments do not require the confirmation of the New York State Senate. Most political advisors report to the secretary to the governor, while most policy advisors report to the director of state operations, who also answers to the secretary to the governor, making that position, in practice, the true chief of staff and most powerful position in the Cabinet. The actual "chief of staff" is in charge of the Office of Scheduling and holds no authority over other cabinet officials.

The governor is also charged with naming the heads of the various departments, divisions, boards, and offices within the state government. These nominees require confirmation by the state Senate. While some appointees may share the title of commissioner, director, etc., only department level-heads are considered members of the actual state cabinet, although the heads of the various divisions, boards, and offices may attend cabinet-level meetings from time to time.

== Line of succession ==
The Constitution of New York has provided since 1777 for the election of a lieutenant governor of New York, who also acts as president of the State Senate, to the same term (keeping the same term lengths as the governor throughout all the constitutional revisions). Originally, in the event of the death, resignation or impeachment of the governor, or absence from the state, the lieutenant governor would take on the governor's duties and powers. Since the 1938 constitution, the lieutenant governor explicitly becomes governor upon such vacancy in the office.

Should the office of lieutenant governor become vacant, the temporary president of the state senate performs the duties of a lieutenant governor until the governor can take back the duties of the office, or the next election; likewise, should both offices become vacant, the temporary president acts as governor, with the office of lieutenant governor remaining vacant. Although no provision exists in the constitution for it, precedent set in 2009 allows the governor to appoint a lieutenant governor should a vacancy occur. Should the temporary president be unable to fulfill the duties, the speaker of the assembly is next in the line of succession.

Line of succession:

1. Lieutenant Governor
2. Temporary President of the Senate
3. Speaker of the Assembly
4. Attorney General
5. Comptroller
6. Commissioner of Transportation
7. Commissioner of Health
8. Commissioner of Commerce
9. Industrial Commissioner
10. Chairman of the Public Service Commission
11. Secretary of State

== Timeline ==
Timeline of New York governors

== See also ==
- Politics of New York (state)
- List of governors of New York
- First ladies and gentlemen of New York
- List of colonial governors of New York
- New York gubernatorial elections, for results of the elections for the Governor and Lieutenant Governor of New York.

== Bibliography ==
- Paterson, David (2020). Black, Blind, & In Charge: A Story of Visionary Leadership and Overcoming Adversity. New York, New York: Skyhorse Publishing. ISBN 9781510763098.
- Benjamin, Gerald (September 20, 2012). The Oxford Handbook of New York State Government and Politics. Oxford University Press. ISBN 9780195387230.
- Ward, Robert (2002). New York State Government What it Does, How it Works. The Rockefeller University Press. ISBN 9780914341888.
- Schneier, Edward; Pole, Antoinette; Maniscalco, Anthony (2023). New York Politics: A Tale of Two States (3rded ed.). Cornell University Press. p. 372. ISBN 978-1501767272.
- Glazer, Nathan; Moynihan, Daneil (August 15, 1964). Beyond The Melting Pot: The Negroes, Puerto Ricans, Jews, Italians, and Irish of New York City. MIT Press. p. 360. ISBN 9780262570046.
- Caro, Robert (1975). The Power Broker Robert Moses and the Fall of New York. Vintage. ISBN 9780394720241.
