= List of federal judges appointed by Barack Obama =

Following is a comprehensive list of all Article III and Article IV United States federal judges appointed by President Barack Obama during his presidency, as well as a partial list of Article I federal judicial appointments, excluding appointments to the District of Columbia judiciary.

The total number of Obama Article III judgeship nominees to be confirmed by the United States Senate is 329, including two justices to the Supreme Court of the United States, 55 judges to the United States Courts of Appeals, 268 judges to the United States district courts, and four judges to the United States Court of International Trade. Obama did not make any recess appointments to the federal courts.

In terms of Article I courts, Obama made eight appointments to the United States Tax Court, three appointments to the United States Court of Federal Claims, three appointments to the United States Court of Appeals for Veterans Claims, two appointments to the United States Court of Military Commission Review, and two appointments to the United States Court of Appeals for the Armed Forces. He also elevated two chief judges of the Court of Federal Claims.

On the Article IV territorial courts, President Obama made two appointments and elevated one judge to the position of chief judge.

== United States Supreme Court justices ==
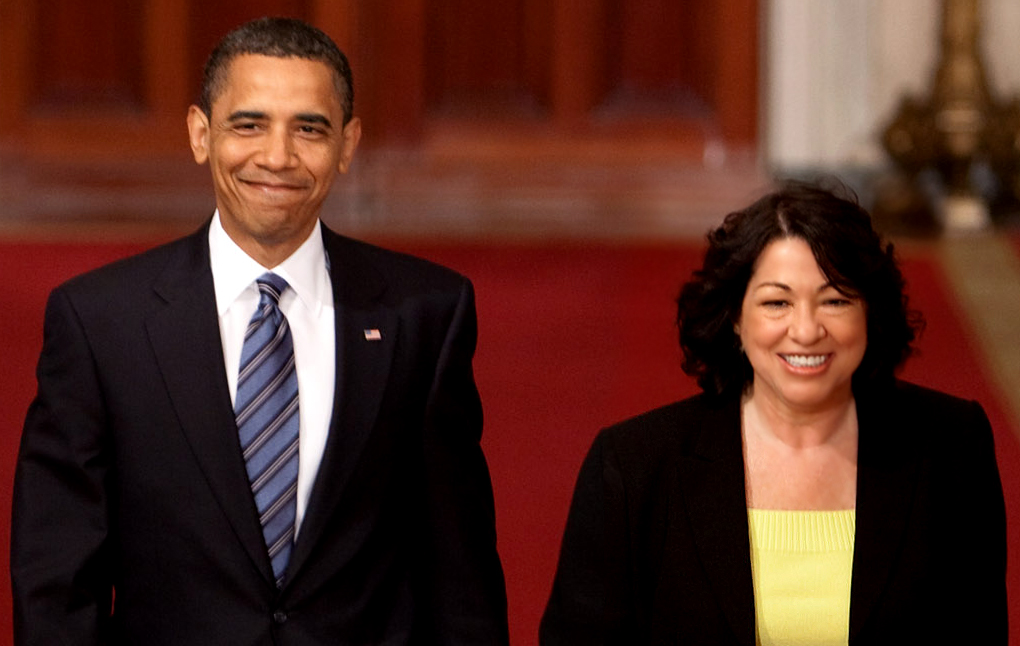
Barack Obama with his first Supreme Court nominee, Sonia Sotomayor

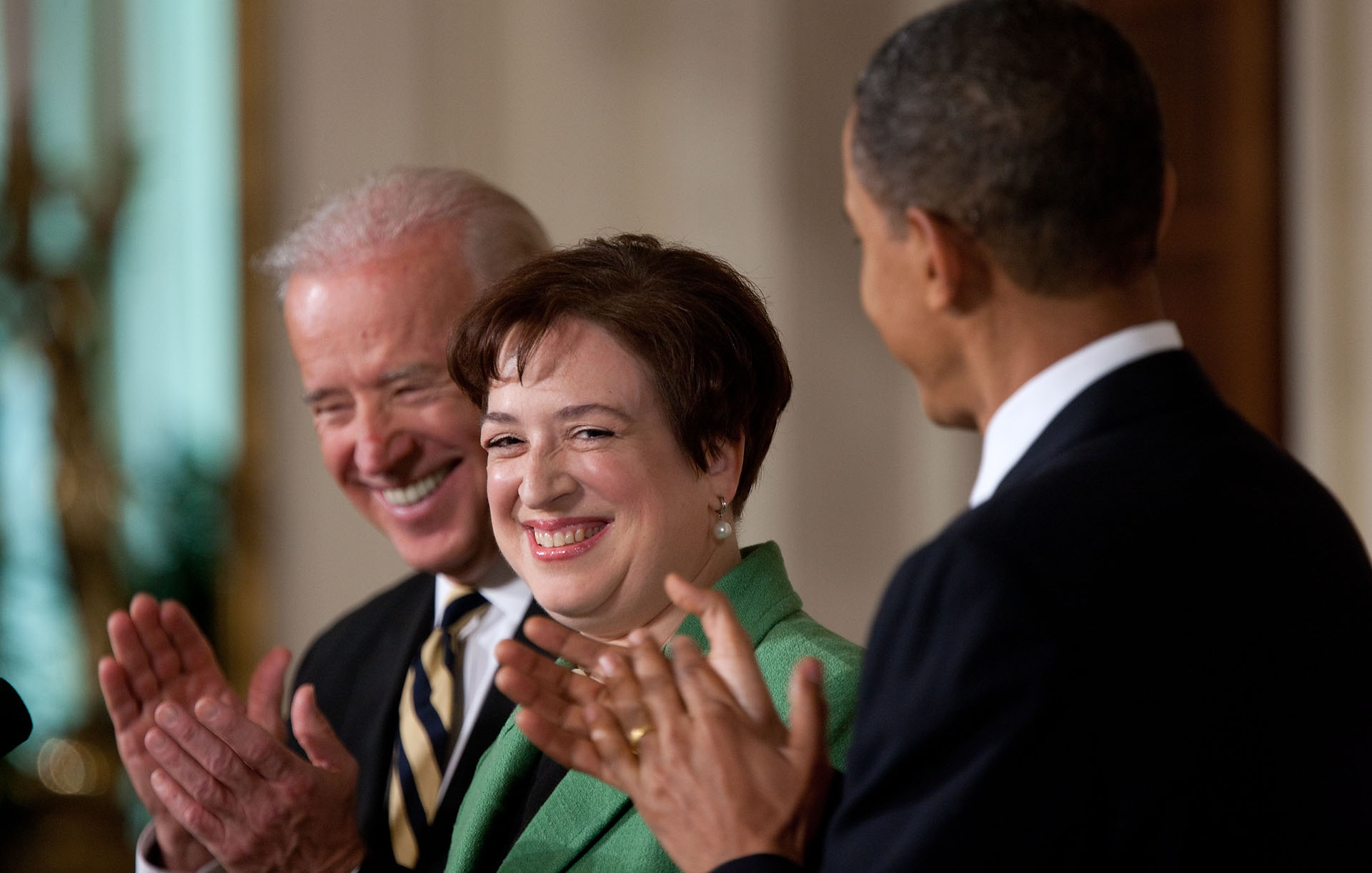
Barack Obama with his second Supreme Court nominee, Elena Kagan

#	Justice	Seat	State	Former justice	Nomination date	Confirmation date	Confirmation vote	Began active service	Ended active service
1	Sonia Sotomayor	3	New York	David Souter	June 1, 2009	August 6, 2009	68–31	August 8, 2009	Incumbent
2	Elena Kagan	4	Massachusetts	John Paul Stevens	May 10, 2010	August 5, 2010	63–37	August 7, 2010	Incumbent

== Courts of appeals ==
#	Judge	Circuit	Nomination date	Confirmation date	Confirmation vote	Began active service	Ended active service	Ended senior status
1	Gerard E. Lynch	Second	April 2, 2009	September 17, 2009	94–3	September 18, 2009	September 5, 2016	Incumbent
2	Andre M. Davis	Fourth	April 2, 2009 (Note: Was previously nominated by President Clinton on October 12, 2000. That nomination expired at the end of the term. Renominated on April 2, 2009 by President Obama.)	November 9, 2009	72–16	November 10, 2009	February 28, 2014	August 31, 2017
3	David Hamilton	Seventh	March 17, 2009	November 19, 2009	59–39	November 23, 2009	December 5, 2022	Incumbent
4	Beverly B. Martin	Eleventh	June 19, 2009	January 20, 2010	97–0	January 28, 2010	September 30, 2021	–
5	Joseph A. Greenaway Jr.	Third	June 19, 2009	February 9, 2010	84–0	February 12, 2010	June 15, 2023	–
6	Barbara Milano Keenan	Fourth	September 14, 2009	March 2, 2010	99–0	March 9, 2010	August 31, 2021	Incumbent
7	O. Rogeriee Thompson	First	October 6, 2009	March 17, 2010	98–0	March 30, 2010	September 21, 2022	Incumbent
8	Thomas I. Vanaskie	Third	August 6, 2009	April 21, 2010	77–20	April 26, 2010	November 30, 2018	January 2, 2019
9	Denny Chin	Second	October 6, 2009	April 22, 2010	98–0	April 23, 2010	June 1, 2021	Incumbent
10	James Andrew Wynn	Fourth	November 4, 2009 (Note: Was previously nominated by President Clinton on August 5, 1999. That nomination expired at the end of the term. Renominated by President Clinton on January 3, 2001. That nomination was withdrawn on March 19, 2001 by President Bush. Renominated on November 4, 2009 by President Obama.)	August 5, 2010	voice vote	August 10, 2010	Incumbent	–
11	Jane Branstetter Stranch	Sixth	August 6, 2009	September 13, 2010	71–21	September 15, 2010	July 14, 2025	Incumbent
12	Albert Diaz	Fourth	November 4, 2009	December 18, 2010	voice vote	December 22, 2010	Incumbent	–
13	Raymond Lohier	Second	March 10, 2010	December 19, 2010	92–0	December 20, 2010	Incumbent	–
14	Mary H. Murguia	Ninth	March 25, 2010	December 22, 2010	89–0	January 4, 2011	Incumbent	–
15	Scott Matheson Jr.	Tenth	March 3, 2010	December 22, 2010	voice vote	December 27, 2010	Incumbent	–
16	Kathleen M. O'Malley	Federal	March 10, 2010	December 22, 2010	voice vote	December 27, 2010	March 11, 2022	–
17	James E. Graves Jr.	Fifth	June 10, 2010 (Note: Renominated on January 5, 2011, after the initial nomination expired.)	February 14, 2011	voice vote	February 15, 2011	Incumbent	–
18	Jimmie V. Reyna	Federal	September 29, 2010	April 4, 2011	86–0	April 5, 2011	Incumbent	–
19	Susan L. Carney	Second	May 20, 2010	May 17, 2011	71–28	May 17, 2011	September 27, 2022	Incumbent
20	Bernice B. Donald	Sixth	December 1, 2010	September 6, 2011	96–2	September 8, 2011	September 27, 2022	January 20, 2023
21	Henry F. Floyd	Fourth	January 26, 2011	October 3, 2011	96–0	October 5, 2011	December 31, 2021	Incumbent
22	Stephen A. Higginson	Fifth	May 9, 2011	October 31, 2011	88–0	November 2, 2011	Incumbent	–
23	Evan Wallach	Federal	July 28, 2011	November 8, 2011	99–0	November 18, 2011	May 31, 2021	Incumbent
24	Christopher F. Droney	Second	May 4, 2011	November 28, 2011	88–0	December 1, 2011	June 30, 2019	January 2, 2020
25	Morgan Christen	Ninth	May 18, 2011	December 15, 2011	95–3	January 11, 2012	Incumbent	–
26	Adalberto Jordan	Eleventh	August 2, 2011	February 15, 2012	94–5	February 17, 2012	Incumbent	–
27	Stephanie Thacker	Fourth	September 8, 2011	April 16, 2012	91–3	April 17, 2012	Incumbent	–
28	Jacqueline Nguyen	Ninth	September 22, 2011	May 7, 2012	91–3	May 14, 2012	Incumbent	–
29	Paul J. Watford	Ninth	October 17, 2011	May 21, 2012	61–34	May 22, 2012	May 31, 2023	–
30	Andrew D. Hurwitz	Ninth	November 2, 2011	June 12, 2012	voice vote	June 27, 2012	October 3, 2022	Incumbent
31	William J. Kayatta Jr.	First	January 23, 2012 (Note: Renominated on January 3, 2013, after the initial nomination expired.)	February 13, 2013	88–12	February 14, 2013	October 31, 2024	Incumbent
32	Robert E. Bacharach	Tenth	January 23, 2012	February 25, 2013	93–0	February 28, 2013	Incumbent	–
33	Richard G. Taranto	Federal	November 10, 2011	March 11, 2013	91–0	March 12, 2013	Incumbent	–
34	Patty Shwartz	Third	October 5, 2011	April 9, 2013	64–34	April 10, 2013	Incumbent	–
35	Jane L. Kelly	Eighth	January 31, 2013	April 24, 2013	96–0	April 25, 2013	Incumbent	–
36	Sri Srinivasan	D.C.	June 11, 2012	May 23, 2013	97–0	May 24, 2013	Incumbent	–
37	Gregory A. Phillips	Tenth	January 31, 2013	July 8, 2013	88–0	July 9, 2013	Incumbent	–
38	Raymond T. Chen	Federal	February 7, 2013	August 1, 2013	97–0	August 2, 2013	Incumbent	–
39	Todd M. Hughes	Federal	February 7, 2013	September 24, 2013	98–0	September 24, 2013	Incumbent	–
40	Patricia Millett	D.C.	June 4, 2013	December 10, 2013	56–38	December 10, 2013	Incumbent	–
41	Cornelia Pillard	D.C.	June 4, 2013	December 12, 2013	51–44	December 17, 2013	Incumbent	–
42	Robert L. Wilkins	D.C.	June 4, 2013	January 13, 2014	55–43	January 15, 2014	Incumbent	–
43	Carolyn B. McHugh	Tenth	May 16, 2013 (Note: Renominated on January 6, 2014, after the initial nomination expired.)	March 12, 2014	98–0	March 14, 2014	Incumbent	–
44	John B. Owens	Ninth	August 1, 2013	March 31, 2014	56–43	April 2, 2014	Incumbent	–
45	Michelle Friedland	Ninth	August 1, 2013	April 28, 2014	51–40	April 29, 2014	Incumbent	–
46	Nancy Moritz	Tenth	August 1, 2013	May 5, 2014	90–3	July 29, 2014	Incumbent	–
47	Robin S. Rosenbaum	Eleventh	November 7, 2013	May 12, 2014	91–0	June 2, 2014	Incumbent	–
48	Gregg Costa	Fifth	December 19, 2013	May 20, 2014	97–0	June 2, 2014	August 31, 2022	–
49	David J. Barron	First	September 24, 2013	May 22, 2014	53–45	May 23, 2014	Incumbent	–
50	Cheryl Ann Krause	Third	February 6, 2014	July 7, 2014	93–0	July 9, 2014	Incumbent	–
51	Julie E. Carnes	Eleventh	December 19, 2013	July 21, 2014	94–0	July 31, 2014	June 18, 2018	Incumbent
52	Pamela Harris	Fourth	May 8, 2014	July 28, 2014	50–43	July 29, 2014	Incumbent	–
53	Jill A. Pryor	Eleventh	February 16, 2012 (Note: Renominated on January 4, 2013 and January 6, 2014.)	September 8, 2014	97–0	September 9, 2014	Incumbent	–
54	Kara Farnandez Stoll	Federal	November 12, 2014 (Note: Renominated on January 7, 2015, after the initial nomination expired.)	July 7, 2015	95–0	July 9, 2015	Incumbent	–
55	L. Felipe Restrepo	Third	November 12, 2014	January 11, 2016	82–6	January 13, 2016	Incumbent	–

== District courts ==
#	Judge	Court (Note: See List of United States district and territorial courts)	Nomination date	Confirmation date	Confirmation vote	Began active service	Ended active service	Ended senior status
1	Jeffrey L. Viken	D.S.D.	June 25, 2009	September 29, 2009	99–0	September 30, 2009	October 1, 2021	October 1, 2023
2	Roberto Lange	D.S.D.	July 8, 2009	October 21, 2009	100–0	October 21, 2009	Incumbent	–
3	Irene Berger	S.D.W.Va.	July 8, 2009	October 27, 2009	97–0	November 9, 2009	Incumbent	–
4	Charlene Edwards Honeywell	M.D. Fla.	June 25, 2009	November 9, 2009	88–0	November 12, 2009	December 4, 2023	Incumbent
5	Christina Reiss	D. Vt.	October 13, 2009	November 21, 2009	voice vote	December 21, 2009	Incumbent	–
6	Abdul K. Kallon	N.D. Ala.	July 31, 2009	November 21, 2009	voice vote	January 4, 2010	August 31, 2022	–
7	Jacqueline Nguyen	C.D. Cal.	July 31, 2009	December 1, 2009	97–0	December 4, 2009	May 15, 2012	Elevated
8	Richard Seeborg	N.D. Cal.	August 6, 2009	December 24, 2009	voice vote	January 4, 2010	Incumbent	–
9	Dolly Gee	C.D. Cal.	August 6, 2009 (Note: Was previously nominated by President Clinton to a different seat on the same court on May 27, 1999. That nomination expired at the end of the term. Renominated on August 6, 2009 to a different seat on the same court by President Obama.)	December 24, 2009	voice vote	January 4, 2010	Incumbent	–
10	Rosanna M. Peterson	E.D. Wash.	October 13, 2009	January 25, 2010	89–0	January 26, 2010	October 1, 2021	Incumbent
11	William M. Conley	W.D. Wis.	October 29, 2009	March 4, 2010	99–0	March 25, 2010	Incumbent	–
12	Gloria Navarro	D. Nev.	December 24, 2009	May 5, 2010	98–0	May 6, 2010	Incumbent	–
13	Nancy D. Freudenthal	D. Wyo.	December 3, 2009	May 5, 2010	96–1	May 6, 2010	June 1, 2022	Incumbent
14	D. Price Marshall Jr.	E.D. Ark.	December 3, 2009	May 5, 2010	voice vote	May 6, 2010	Incumbent	–
15	Timothy Black	S.D. Ohio	December 24, 2009	May 11, 2010	voice vote	May 13, 2010	May 18, 2022	Incumbent
16	Jon DeGuilio	N.D. Ind.	January 20, 2010	May 11, 2010	voice vote	May 13, 2010	July 17, 2023	Incumbent
17	Audrey G. Fleissig	E.D. Mo.	January 20, 2010	June 7, 2010	90–0	June 9, 2010	April 14, 2023	Incumbent
18	Lucy Koh	N.D. Cal.	January 20, 2010	June 7, 2010	90–0	June 9, 2010	December 14, 2021	Elevated
19	Jane Magnus-Stinson	S.D. Ind.	January 20, 2010	June 7, 2010	voice vote	June 9, 2010	July 1, 2024	Incumbent
20	Tanya Walton Pratt	S.D. Ind.	January 20, 2010	June 15, 2010	95–0	June 15, 2010	Incumbent	–
21	Brian A. Jackson	M.D. La.	October 29, 2009	June 15, 2010	96–0	June 15, 2010	Incumbent	–
22	Elizabeth Erny Foote	W.D. La.	February 4, 2010	June 15, 2010	voice vote	June 15, 2010	January 21, 2022	Incumbent
23	Mark A. Goldsmith	E.D. Mich.	February 4, 2010	June 21, 2010	89–0	June 22, 2010	Incumbent	–
24	Marc T. Treadwell	M.D. Ga.	February 4, 2010	June 21, 2010	89–0	June 22, 2010	Incumbent	–
25	Josephine Staton	C.D. Cal.	February 4, 2010	June 21, 2010	voice vote	June 22, 2010	September 19, 2026	Incumbent
26	Gary Feinerman	N.D. Ill.	February 24, 2010	June 28, 2010	80–0	June 29, 2010	December 31, 2022	–
27	Sharon Johnson Coleman	N.D. Ill.	February 24, 2010	July 12, 2010	86–0	July 13, 2010	Incumbent	–
28	J. Michelle Childs	D.S.C.	December 22, 2009	August 5, 2010	voice vote	August 20, 2010	August 2, 2022	Elevated
29	Richard Gergel	D.S.C.	December 22, 2009	August 5, 2010	voice vote	August 9, 2010	Incumbent	–
30	Leonard P. Stark	D. Del.	March 17, 2010	August 5, 2010	voice vote	August 10, 2010	March 17, 2022	Elevated
31	Catherine Eagles	M.D.N.C.	March 10, 2010	December 16, 2010	voice vote	December 22, 2010	December 31, 2024	Incumbent
32	Kimberly J. Mueller	E.D. Cal.	March 10, 2010	December 16, 2010	voice vote	December 21, 2010	September 17, 2024	January 4, 2026
33	John A. Gibney Jr.	E.D. Va.	April 14, 2010	December 16, 2010	voice vote	December 17, 2010	November 1, 2021	Incumbent
34	James K. Bredar	D. Md.	April 21, 2010	December 16, 2010	voice vote	December 17, 2010	April 30, 2024	Incumbent
35	Susan Richard Nelson	D. Minn.	April 21, 2010	December 17, 2010	voice vote	December 21, 2010	December 31, 2021	Incumbent
36	Denise J. Casper	D. Mass.	April 28, 2010	December 17, 2010	voice vote	December 20, 2010	Incumbent	–
37	Ellen Lipton Hollander	D. Md.	April 21, 2010	December 18, 2010	95–0	December 28, 2010	January 4, 2022	Incumbent
38	Edmond E. Chang	N.D. Ill.	April 21, 2010	December 18, 2010	voice vote	December 20, 2010	Incumbent	–
39	Leslie E. Kobayashi	D. Haw.	April 21, 2010	December 18, 2010	voice vote	December 22, 2010	October 9, 2024	Incumbent
40	Carlton W. Reeves	S.D. Miss.	April 28, 2010	December 19, 2010	voice vote	December 20, 2010	Incumbent	–
41	Benita Y. Pearson	N.D. Ohio	December 3, 2009	December 21, 2010	56–39	December 27, 2010	Incumbent	–
42	William J. Martínez	D. Colo.	February 24, 2010	December 21, 2010	58–37	December 21, 2010	February 10, 2023	Incumbent
43	Beryl Howell	D.D.C.	July 14, 2010	December 22, 2010	voice vote	December 27, 2010	February 1, 2024	Incumbent
44	Robert L. Wilkins	D.D.C.	May 20, 2010	December 22, 2010	voice vote	December 27, 2010	January 24, 2014	Elevated
45	Marco A. Hernandez	D. Ore.	July 14, 2010 (Note: Was previously nominated by President Bush on July 23, 2008. That nomination expired on January 2, 2009. Renominated on July 14, 2010 by President Obama. Renominated on January 5, 2011, after the initial nomination expired)	February 7, 2011	voice vote	February 9, 2011	August 21, 2024	Incumbent
46	Diana Saldaña	S.D. Tex.	July 14, 2010	February 7, 2011	94–0	February 9, 2011	Incumbent	–
47	Paul K. Holmes III	W.D. Ark.	April 28, 2010	February 7, 2011	95–0	February 8, 2011	November 10, 2021	Incumbent
48	Edward Davila	N.D. Cal.	May 20, 2010	February 14, 2011	93–0	March 3, 2011	December 11, 2024	Incumbent
49	Amy Totenberg	N.D. Ga.	March 17, 2010	February 28, 2011	voice vote	March 1, 2011	April 3, 2021	Incumbent
50	Steve C. Jones	N.D. Ga.	July 14, 2010	February 28, 2011	90–0	March 3, 2011	January 1, 2025	Incumbent
51	Sue E. Myerscough	C.D. Ill.	June 17, 2010 (Note: Was previously nominated to a different seat on the same court by President Clinton on October 11, 1995, but withdrew her nomination. Initially nominated to a different seat on the same court on June 17, 2010 by President Obama, but that nomination was withdrawn and she was nominated to this seat on July 14, 2010, and renominated on January 5, 2011.)	March 7, 2011	voice vote	March 14, 2011	March 9, 2023	Incumbent
52	James Shadid	C.D. Ill.	May 27, 2010	March 7, 2011	89–0	March 10, 2011	September 27, 2024	April 1, 2025
53	Anthony J. Battaglia	S.D. Cal.	May 20, 2010	March 7, 2011	89–0	March 9, 2011	March 31, 2021	Incumbent
54	Max O. Cogburn Jr.	W.D.N.C.	May 27, 2010	March 10, 2011	96–0	March 11, 2011	Incumbent	–
55	James Boasberg	D.D.C.	June 17, 2010	March 14, 2011	96–0	March 17, 2011	Incumbent	–
56	Amy Berman Jackson	D.D.C.	June 17, 2010	March 17, 2011	97–0	March 18, 2011	May 1, 2023	Incumbent
57	Mae D'Agostino	N.D.N.Y.	September 29, 2010	March 28, 2011	88–0	March 30, 2011	Incumbent	–
58	Vincent L. Briccetti	S.D.N.Y.	November 17, 2010	April 12, 2011	voice vote	April 14, 2011	April 21, 2023	Incumbent
59	John Kronstadt	C.D. Cal.	November 17, 2010	April 12, 2011	96–0	April 14, 2011	April 1, 2022	Incumbent
60	Roy B. Dalton Jr.	M.D. Fla.	November 17, 2010	May 2, 2011	voice vote	May 3, 2011	July 9, 2022	Incumbent
61	Kevin H. Sharp	M.D. Tenn.	November 17, 2010	May 2, 2011	89–0	May 3, 2011	April 15, 2017	–
62	John J. McConnell Jr.	D.R.I.	March 10, 2010 (Note: Renominated on September 13, 2010 and January 5, 2011.)	May 4, 2011	50–44	May 6, 2011	Incumbent	–
63	Edward M. Chen	N.D. Cal.	August 6, 2009 (Note: Renominated on January 20, 2010, September 13, 2010 and January 5, 2011.)	May 10, 2011	56–42	May 12, 2011	May 17, 2022	Incumbent
64	Arenda Wright Allen	E.D. Va.	December 1, 2010	May 11, 2011	96–0	May 12, 2011	May 13, 2026	Incumbent
65	Michael F. Urbanski	W.D. Va.	December 1, 2010	May 12, 2011	94–0	May 13, 2011	July 4, 2024	Incumbent
66	Claire C. Cecchi	D.N.J.	December 1, 2010	June 14, 2011	98–0	June 14, 2011	Incumbent	–
67	Esther Salas	D.N.J.	December 1, 2010	June 14, 2011	voice vote	June 14, 2011	Incumbent	–
68	Michael H. Simon	D. Ore.	July 14, 2010	June 21, 2011	64–35	June 22, 2011	Incumbent	–
69	J. Paul Oetken	S.D.N.Y.	January 26, 2011	July 18, 2011	80–13	July 20, 2011	Incumbent	–
70	Paul A. Engelmayer	S.D.N.Y.	February 2, 2011	July 26, 2011	98–0	July 27, 2011	Incumbent	–
71	Sara Darrow	C.D. Ill.	November 17, 2010	August 2, 2011	voice vote	August 3, 2011	Incumbent	–
72	R. Brooke Jackson	D. Colo.	September 29, 2010	August 2, 2011	voice vote	September 1, 2011	September 30, 2021	Incumbent
73	Kathleen M. Williams	S.D. Fla.	July 21, 2010	August 2, 2011	voice vote	August 4, 2011	Incumbent	–
74	Nelva Gonzales Ramos	S.D. Tex.	January 26, 2011	August 2, 2011	voice vote	August 4, 2011	Incumbent	–
75	John Andrew Ross	E.D. Mo.	December 1, 2010	September 20, 2011	voice vote	October 11, 2011	June 9, 2023	Incumbent
76	Timothy M. Cain	D.S.C.	February 16, 2011	September 20, 2011	99–0	September 26, 2011	October 1, 2026	Incumbent
77	Nannette Jolivette Brown	E.D. La.	March 2, 2011	October 3, 2011	voice vote	October 4, 2011	Incumbent	–
78	Nancy Torresen	D. Me.	March 2, 2011	October 3, 2011	voice vote	October 4, 2011	October 11, 2025	Incumbent
79	William F. Kuntz II	E.D.N.Y.	March 9, 2011	October 3, 2011	voice vote	October 4, 2011	January 1, 2022	Incumbent
80	Marina Garcia Marmolejo	S.D. Tex.	July 28, 2010	October 3, 2011	voice vote	October 4, 2011	Incumbent	–
81	Jennifer Zipps	D. Ariz.	June 23, 2011	October 3, 2011	voice vote	October 5, 2011	Incumbent	–
82	Jane Triche Milazzo	E.D. La.	March 16, 2011	October 11, 2011	98–0	October 12, 2011	Incumbent	–
83	Alison Nathan	S.D.N.Y.	March 31, 2011	October 13, 2011	48–44	October 17, 2011	March 31, 2022	Elevated
84	Susan O. Hickey	W.D. Ark.	April 6, 2011	October 13, 2011	83–8	October 19, 2011	April 14, 2026	Incumbent
85	Katherine B. Forrest	S.D.N.Y.	May 4, 2011	October 13, 2011	voice vote	October 17, 2011	September 11, 2018	–
86	Cathy Bissoon	W.D. Pa.	November 17, 2010	October 17, 2011	82–3	October 19, 2011	Incumbent	–
87	Mark R. Hornak	W.D. Pa.	December 1, 2010	October 19, 2011	voice vote	October 19, 2011	Incumbent	–
88	Robert N. Scola Jr.	S.D. Fla.	May 4, 2011	October 19, 2011	voice vote	October 20, 2011	October 31, 2023	Incumbent
89	Robert D. Mariani	M.D. Pa.	December 1, 2010	October 19, 2011	82–17	October 19, 2011	September 30, 2022	Incumbent
90	Richard G. Andrews	D. Del.	May 11, 2011	November 3, 2011	voice vote	November 7, 2011	December 31, 2023	Incumbent
91	Scott W. Skavdahl	D. Wyo.	February 16, 2011	November 3, 2011	96–0	November 7, 2011	Incumbent	–
92	Sharon L. Gleason	D. Alaska	April 6, 2011	November 15, 2011	87–8	January 4, 2012	Incumbent	–
93	Yvonne Gonzalez Rogers	N.D. Cal.	May 4, 2011	November 15, 2011	89–6	November 21, 2011	Incumbent	–
94	Edgardo Ramos	S.D.N.Y.	May 4, 2011	December 5, 2011	89–0	December 6, 2011	Incumbent	–
95	Andrew L. Carter Jr.	S.D.N.Y.	May 19, 2011	December 5, 2011	voice vote	December 8, 2011	Incumbent	–
96	J. Rodney Gilstrap	E.D. Tex.	May 19, 2011	December 5, 2011	voice vote	December 6, 2011	Incumbent	–
97	Dana L. Christensen	D. Mont.	May 4, 2011	December 5, 2011	voice vote	December 6, 2011	November 7, 2025	Incumbent
98	John M. Gerrard	D. Neb.	May 4, 2011	January 23, 2012	74–16	February 6, 2012	February 6, 2023	Incumbent
99	Cathy Ann Bencivengo	S.D. Cal.	May 11, 2011	February 9, 2012	90–6	February 10, 2012	Incumbent	–
100	Jesse M. Furman	S.D.N.Y.	June 7, 2011	February 17, 2012	62–34	February 17, 2012	Incumbent	–
101	Margo Kitsy Brodie	E.D.N.Y.	June 7, 2011	February 27, 2012	86–2	February 29, 2012	Incumbent	–
102	Beth Phillips	W.D. Mo.	June 7, 2011	March 6, 2012	95–2	March 22, 2012	Incumbent	–
103	Thomas O. Rice	E.D. Wash.	June 29, 2011	March 6, 2012	93–4	March 8, 2012	Incumbent	–
104	Gina M. Groh	N.D.W.Va.	May 19, 2011	March 15, 2012	95–2	March 20, 2012	Incumbent	–
105	Michael W. Fitzgerald	C.D. Cal.	July 20, 2011	March 15, 2012	91–6	March 15, 2012	Incumbent	–
106	David Nuffer	D. Utah	June 29, 2011	March 22, 2012	96–2	March 23, 2012	April 2, 2022	Incumbent
107	Ronnie Abrams	S.D.N.Y.	July 28, 2011	March 22, 2012	96–2	March 23, 2012	Incumbent	–
108	Rudolph Contreras	D.D.C.	July 28, 2011	March 22, 2012	voice vote	March 23, 2012	Incumbent	–
109	Miranda Du	D. Nev.	August 2, 2011	March 28, 2012	59–39	March 30, 2012	Incumbent	–
110	Susie Morgan	E.D. La.	June 7, 2011	March 28, 2012	96–1	March 30, 2012	Incumbent	–
111	Brian C. Wimes	E.D. Mo. W.D. Mo.	September 22, 2011	April 23, 2012	92–1	April 30, 2012	Incumbent	–
112	Gregg Costa	S.D. Tex.	September 8, 2011	April 26, 2012	97–2	April 26, 2012	June 2, 2014	Elevated
113	David C. Guaderrama	W.D. Tex.	September 14, 2011	April 26, 2012	voice vote	April 30, 2012	May 27, 2023	Incumbent
114	Kristine Baker	E.D. Ark.	November 2, 2011	May 7, 2012	voice vote	May 8, 2012	Incumbent	–
115	John Z. Lee	N.D. Ill.	November 10, 2011	May 7, 2012	voice vote	May 8, 2012	September 12, 2022	Elevated
116	George L. Russell III	D. Md.	November 10, 2011	May 14, 2012	voice vote	May 22, 2012	Incumbent	–
117	John Tharp	N.D. Ill.	November 10, 2011 (Note: Was previously nominated to a different seat on the same court by President Bush on October 11, 2008. That nomination expired on January 2, 2009. Renominated to a different seat on the same court on November 10, 2011 by President Obama.)	May 14, 2012	86–1	May 16, 2012	September 30, 2026	Incumbent
118	Timothy S. Hillman	D. Mass.	November 30, 2011	June 4, 2012	88–1	June 6, 2012	July 1, 2022	July 25, 2024
119	Jeffrey J. Helmick	N.D. Ohio	May 11, 2011	June 6, 2012	62–36	June 7, 2012	Incumbent	–
120	Mary Geiger Lewis	D.S.C.	March 16, 2011	June 18, 2012	64–27	June 20, 2012	Incumbent	–
121	Robin S. Rosenbaum	S.D. Fla.	November 30, 2011	June 26, 2012	92–3	June 27, 2012	June 3, 2014	Elevated
122	John T. Fowlkes Jr.	W.D. Tenn.	December 16, 2011	July 10, 2012	94–2	August 1, 2012	September 1, 2022	Incumbent
123	Kevin McNulty	D.N.J.	December 16, 2011	July 16, 2012	91–3	July 18, 2012	October 31, 2023	Incumbent
124	Michael A. Shipp	D.N.J.	January 23, 2012	July 23, 2012	91–1	July 26, 2012	Incumbent	–
125	Gershwin A. Drain	E.D. Mich.	November 17, 2011	August 2, 2012	55–41	August 8, 2012	August 13, 2022	Incumbent
126	Stephanie M. Rose	S.D. Iowa	February 2, 2012	September 10, 2012	89–1	September 17, 2012	Incumbent	–
127	Gonzalo P. Curiel	S.D. Cal.	November 10, 2011	September 21, 2012	voice vote	October 1, 2012	September 7, 2023	Incumbent
128	Robert J. Shelby	D. Utah	November 30, 2011	September 21, 2012	voice vote	September 25, 2012	Incumbent	–
129	Paul W. Grimm	D. Md.	February 16, 2012	December 3, 2012	92–1	December 6, 2012	December 11, 2022	December 30, 2022
130	Michael P. Shea	D. Conn.	February 2, 2012	December 5, 2012	72–23	December 7, 2012	Incumbent	–
131	Mark E. Walker	N.D. Fla.	February 16, 2012	December 6, 2012	94–0	December 7, 2012	Incumbent	–
132	Terrence Berg	E.D. Mich.	April 25, 2012	December 6, 2012	voice vote	December 7, 2012	Incumbent	–
133	John E. Dowdell	N.D. Okla.	February 29, 2012	December 11, 2012	95–0	December 12, 2012	June 21, 2021	Incumbent
134	Jesus Bernal	C.D. Cal.	April 25, 2012	December 11, 2012	voice vote	December 12, 2012	Incumbent	–
135	Lorna G. Schofield	S.D.N.Y.	April 25, 2012	December 13, 2012	91–0	December 13, 2012	January 1, 2025	Incumbent
136	Frank P. Geraci Jr.	W.D.N.Y.	May 14, 2012	December 13, 2012	voice vote	January 2, 2013	April 1, 2023	Incumbent
137	Fernando M. Olguin	C.D. Cal.	May 14, 2012	December 17, 2012	voice vote	January 16, 2013	Incumbent	–
138	Thomas M. Durkin	N.D. Ill.	May 21, 2012	December 17, 2012	voice vote	December 19, 2012	December 26, 2023	Incumbent
139	Matthew W. Brann	M.D. Pa.	May 17, 2012	December 21, 2012	voice vote	December 27, 2012	Incumbent	–
140	Malachy E. Mannion	M.D. Pa.	May 17, 2012	December 21, 2012	voice vote	December 27, 2012	January 3, 2024	Incumbent
141	Jon S. Tigar	N.D. Cal.	June 11, 2012	December 21, 2012	voice vote	January 18, 2013	Incumbent	–
142	Pamela K. Chen	E.D.N.Y.	August 2, 2012	March 4, 2013	voice vote	March 5, 2013	Incumbent	–
143	Katherine Polk Failla	S.D.N.Y.	June 25, 2012	March 4, 2013	91–0	March 5, 2013	Incumbent	–
144	Andrew P. Gordon	D. Nev.	September 19, 2012	March 11, 2013	voice vote	March 12, 2013	Incumbent	–
145	Ketanji Brown Jackson	D.D.C.	September 20, 2012	March 22, 2013	voice vote	March 26, 2013	June 17, 2021	Elevated
146	Raymond P. Moore	D. Colo.	November 14, 2012	March 22, 2013	voice vote	March 26, 2013	June 20, 2023	Incumbent
147	Troy L. Nunley	E.D. Cal.	June 25, 2012	March 22, 2013	voice vote	March 26, 2013	Incumbent	–
148	Beverly Reid O'Connell	C.D. Cal.	November 14, 2012	April 15, 2013	92–0	April 30, 2013	October 8, 2017	–
149	Analisa Torres	S.D.N.Y.	November 14, 2012	April 18, 2013	voice vote	April 23, 2013	Incumbent	–
150	Derrick Watson	D. Haw.	November 14, 2012	April 18, 2013	94–0	April 23, 2013	Incumbent	–
151	Shelly Dick	M.D. La.	April 25, 2012	May 9, 2013	voice vote	May 10, 2013	Incumbent	–
152	Nelson S. Román	S.D.N.Y.	September 20, 2012	May 9, 2013	97–0	May 13, 2013	Incumbent	–
153	William Orrick III	N.D. Cal.	June 11, 2012	May 15, 2013	56–41	May 16, 2013	May 17, 2023	Incumbent
154	Sheri Polster Chappell	M.D. Fla.	June 25, 2012	May 20, 2013	90–0	May 22, 2013	Incumbent	–
155	Michael J. McShane	D. Ore.	September 19, 2012	May 20, 2013	voice vote	May 30, 2013	Incumbent	–
156	Nitza Quiñones Alejandro	E.D. Pa.	November 27, 2012	June 13, 2013	voice vote	June 19, 2013	Incumbent	–
157	Jeffrey L. Schmehl	E.D. Pa.	November 27, 2012	June 13, 2013	100–0	June 25, 2013	Incumbent	–
158	L. Felipe Restrepo	E.D. Pa.	November 27, 2012	June 17, 2013	voice vote	June 19, 2013	January 13, 2016	Elevated
159	Kenneth J. Gonzales	D.N.M.	November 14, 2012	June 17, 2013	89–0	August 9, 2013	Incumbent	–
160	Jennifer A. Dorsey	D. Nev.	September 19, 2012	July 9, 2013	54–41	July 9, 2013	Incumbent	–
161	Valerie E. Caproni	S.D.N.Y.	November 14, 2012	September 9, 2013	73–24	December 2, 2013	January 7, 2025	Incumbent
162	Vernon S. Broderick	S.D.N.Y.	April 15, 2013	September 9, 2013	voice vote	September 10, 2013	Incumbent	–
163	Colin S. Bruce	C.D. Ill.	May 6, 2013	October 7, 2013	96–0	October 8, 2013	Incumbent	–
164	Sara L. Ellis	N.D. Ill.	May 6, 2013	October 7, 2013	voice vote	October 8, 2013	Incumbent	–
165	Andrea Wood	N.D. Ill.	May 6, 2013	October 14, 2013	voice vote	October 15, 2013	Incumbent	–
166	Madeline Haikala	N.D. Ala.	May 9, 2013	October 14, 2013	90–0	October 16, 2013	Incumbent	–
167	Gregory H. Woods	S.D.N.Y.	May 9, 2013	November 4, 2013	voice vote	November 18, 2013	Incumbent	–
168	Debra M. Brown	N.D. Miss.	May 16, 2013	November 4, 2013	90–0	November 5, 2013	Incumbent	–
169	Elizabeth A. Wolford	W.D.N.Y.	May 16, 2013	December 12, 2013	70–29	December 17, 2013	Incumbent	–
170	Landya B. McCafferty	D.N.H.	May 23, 2013	December 12, 2013	79–19	December 17, 2013	Incumbent	–
171	Brian Morris	D. Mont.	May 23, 2013	December 12, 2013	75–20	December 17, 2013	Incumbent	–
172	Susan P. Watters	D. Mont.	May 23, 2013	December 12, 2013	77–19	December 18, 2013	June 8, 2026	Incumbent
173	Brian J. Davis	M.D. Fla.	February 29, 2012	December 20, 2013	68–26	December 26, 2013	December 30, 2023	Incumbent
174	Jeffrey A. Meyer	D. Conn.	June 7, 2013	February 24, 2014	91–2	February 25, 2014	January 12, 2025	–
175	James M. Moody Jr.	E.D. Ark.	July 25, 2013	February 25, 2014	95–4	March 10, 2014	Incumbent	–
176	James Donato	N.D. Cal.	June 20, 2013	February 25, 2014	90–5	February 26, 2014	Incumbent	–
177	Beth Labson Freeman	N.D. Cal.	June 20, 2013	February 25, 2014	91–7	February 26, 2014	Incumbent	–
178	Pedro Delgado Hernández	D.P.R.	June 26, 2013	March 5, 2014	98–0	March 7, 2014	Incumbent	–
179	Pamela L. Reeves	E.D. Tenn.	May 6, 2013	March 5, 2014	99–0	March 7, 2014	September 10, 2020	–
180	Timothy L. Brooks	W.D. Ark.	June 7, 2013	March 5, 2014	100–0	March 7, 2014	Incumbent	–
181	Vince Chhabria	N.D. Cal.	July 25, 2013	March 5, 2014	58–41	March 7, 2014	Incumbent	–
182	Matthew F. Leitman	E.D. Mich.	July 25, 2013	March 12, 2014	98–0	March 14, 2014	Incumbent	–
183	Judith E. Levy	E.D. Mich.	July 25, 2013	March 12, 2014	97–0	March 14, 2014	Incumbent	–
184	Laurie J. Michelson	E.D. Mich.	July 25, 2013	March 12, 2014	98–0	March 14, 2014	Incumbent	–
185	Linda Vivienne Parker	E.D. Mich.	July 25, 2013	March 12, 2014	60–37	March 17, 2014	Incumbent	–
186	Christopher R. Cooper	D.D.C.	August 1, 2013	March 26, 2014	100–0	March 28, 2014	Incumbent	–
187	M. Douglas Harpool	W.D. Mo.	August 1, 2013	March 26, 2014	93–5	March 28, 2014	February 4, 2026	Incumbent
188	Gerald A. McHugh Jr.	E.D. Pa.	August 1, 2013	March 26, 2014	59–41	March 28, 2014	Incumbent	–
189	Edward G. Smith	E.D. Pa.	August 1, 2013	March 26, 2014	69–31	March 31, 2014	November 27, 2023	–
190	Sheryl H. Lipman	W.D. Tenn.	August 1, 2013	April 30, 2014	95–0	May 1, 2014	Incumbent	–
191	Stanley Bastian	E.D. Wash.	September 19, 2013	April 30, 2014	95–0	May 1, 2014	Incumbent	–
192	Manish S. Shah	N.D. Ill.	September 19, 2013	April 30, 2014	95–0	May 1, 2014	Incumbent	–
193	Daniel D. Crabtree	D. Kan.	August 1, 2013	April 30, 2014	94–0	May 1, 2014	August 11, 2025	Incumbent
194	Cynthia Bashant	S.D. Cal.	September 19, 2013	April 30, 2014	94–0	May 8, 2014	Incumbent	–
195	Jon D. Levy	D. Me.	September 19, 2013	April 30, 2014	75–20	May 2, 2014	May 6, 2024	Incumbent
196	Theodore D. Chuang	D. Md.	September 25, 2013	May 1, 2014	53–42	May 2, 2014	Incumbent	–
197	George J. Hazel	D. Md.	September 25, 2013	May 1, 2014	95–0	May 2, 2014	February 24, 2023	–
198	Indira Talwani	D. Mass.	September 24, 2013	May 8, 2014	94–0	May 12, 2014	Incumbent	–
199	James D. Peterson	W.D. Wis.	November 7, 2013	May 8, 2014	70–24	May 12, 2014	Incumbent	–
200	Nancy J. Rosenstengel	S.D. Ill.	November 7, 2013	May 8, 2014	95–0	May 12, 2014	Incumbent	–
201	Steven Paul Logan	D. Ariz.	September 19, 2013	May 14, 2014	96–0	May 16, 2014	Incumbent	–
202	John J. Tuchi	D. Ariz.	September 19, 2013	May 14, 2014	96–0	May 16, 2014	Incumbent	–
203	Diane Humetewa	D. Ariz.	September 19, 2013	May 14, 2014	96–0	May 16, 2014	Incumbent	–
204	Rosemary Márquez	D. Ariz.	June 23, 2011	May 15, 2014	81–15	May 19, 2014	Incumbent	–
205	Douglas L. Rayes	D. Ariz.	September 19, 2013	May 15, 2014	77–19	May 28, 2014	June 1, 2024	Incumbent
206	James A. Soto	D. Ariz.	December 19, 2013	May 15, 2014	93–1	June 9, 2014	July 1, 2024	Incumbent
207	Mark G. Mastroianni	D. Mass.	September 25, 2013	June 4, 2014	92–2	June 5, 2014	Incumbent	–
208	Bruce Howe Hendricks	D.S.C.	June 26, 2013	June 4, 2014	95–0	June 5, 2014	Incumbent	–
209	Tanya S. Chutkan	D.D.C.	December 19, 2013	June 4, 2014	95–0	June 5, 2014	Incumbent	–
210	M. Hannah Lauck	E.D. Va.	December 19, 2013	June 10, 2014	90–0	June 10, 2014	Incumbent	–
211	Leo T. Sorokin	D. Mass.	December 19, 2013	June 10, 2014	91–0	June 10, 2014	Incumbent	–
212	Richard F. Boulware	D. Nev.	January 16, 2014	June 10, 2014	58–35	June 10, 2014	Incumbent	–
213	Salvador Mendoza Jr.	E.D. Wash.	January 16, 2014	June 17, 2014	92–4	June 19, 2014	September 16, 2022	Elevated
214	Staci M. Yandle	S.D. Ill.	January 16, 2014	June 17, 2014	52–44	June 19, 2014	Incumbent	–
215	Darrin P. Gayles	S.D. Fla.	February 6, 2014	June 17, 2014	98–0	June 19, 2014	Incumbent	–
216	Paul G. Byron	M.D. Fla.	February 6, 2014	June 24, 2014	94–0	June 24, 2014	Incumbent	–
217	Carlos E. Mendoza	M.D. Fla.	February 6, 2014	June 24, 2014	94–0	June 27, 2014	Incumbent	–
218	Beth Bloom	S.D. Fla.	February 6, 2014	June 24, 2014	95–0	June 25, 2014	Incumbent	–
219	Geoffrey W. Crawford	D. Vt.	May 20, 2014	June 24, 2014	95–0	August 4, 2014	August 9, 2024	Incumbent
220	Ronnie L. White	E.D. Mo.	November 7, 2013 (Note: Was previously nominated by President Clinton to a different seat on the same court on June 26, 1997. That nomination expired at the end of the term. Renominated by President Clinton on January 26, 1999. That nomination was rejected by the Senate on October 5, 1999. Renominated on November 7, 2013 to a different seat on the same court by President Obama. Renominated on January 6, 2014, after the initial nomination expired.)	July 16, 2014	53–44	July 17, 2014	July 31, 2024	–
221	André Birotte Jr.	C.D. Cal.	April 3, 2014	July 22, 2014	100–0	August 8, 2014	Incumbent	–
222	Robin L. Rosenberg	S.D. Fla.	February 26, 2014	July 22, 2014	100–0	July 24, 2014	Incumbent	–
223	John W. deGravelles	M.D. La.	March 13, 2014	July 22, 2014	100–0	July 23, 2014	Incumbent	–
224	Randolph Moss	D.D.C.	April 3, 2014	November 13, 2014	54–45	November 14, 2014	Incumbent	–
225	Leigh Martin May	N.D. Ga.	December 19, 2013	November 13, 2014	99–0	November 14, 2014	Incumbent	–
226	Leslie Abrams Gardner	M.D. Ga.	March 11, 2014	November 18, 2014	100–0	November 20, 2014	Incumbent	–
227	Mark Howard Cohen	N.D. Ga.	December 19, 2013	November 18, 2014	voice vote	November 20, 2014	Incumbent	–
228	Eleanor L. Ross	N.D. Ga.	December 19, 2013	November 18, 2014	voice vote	November 20, 2014	Incumbent	–
229	Pamela Pepper	E.D. Wis.	May 1, 2014	November 20, 2014	95–0	December 8, 2014	Incumbent	–
230	Brenda K. Sannes	N.D.N.Y.	May 8, 2014	November 20, 2014	96–0	November 21, 2014	Incumbent	–
231	Madeline Cox Arleo	D.N.J.	June 26, 2014	November 20, 2014	voice vote	November 21, 2014	Incumbent	–
232	Wendy Beetlestone	E.D. Pa.	June 16, 2014	November 20, 2014	voice vote	November 21, 2014	Incumbent	–
233	Victor Allen Bolden	D. Conn.	June 16, 2014	November 20, 2014	49–46	November 21, 2014	Incumbent	–
234	David J. Hale	W.D. Ky.	June 19, 2014	December 3, 2014	voice vote	December 10, 2014	Incumbent	–
235	Mark A. Kearney	E.D. Pa.	June 16, 2014	December 3, 2014	voice vote	December 4, 2014	Incumbent	–
236	Jerry Pappert	E.D. Pa.	June 16, 2014	December 3, 2014	voice vote	December 4, 2014	Incumbent	–
237	Gregory N. Stivers	W.D. Ky.	June 19, 2014	December 4, 2014	voice vote	December 5, 2014	Incumbent	–
238	Joseph F. Leeson Jr.	E.D. Pa.	June 16, 2014	December 4, 2014	76–16	December 5, 2014	Incumbent	–
239	Stephen R. Bough	W.D. Mo.	January 16, 2014	December 16, 2014	51–38	December 19, 2014	Incumbent	–
240	Jorge L. Alonso	N.D. Ill.	August 5, 2014	December 16, 2014	voice vote	December 19, 2014	Incumbent	–
241	Haywood Gilliam	N.D. Cal.	September 8, 2014	December 16, 2014	voice vote	December 19, 2014	Incumbent	–
242	Amit Mehta	D.D.C.	July 31, 2014	December 16, 2014	voice vote	December 19, 2014	Incumbent	–
243	Allison D. Burroughs	D. Mass.	July 31, 2014	December 16, 2014	voice vote	December 19, 2014	Incumbent	–
244	John Robert Blakey	N.D. Ill.	August 5, 2014	December 16, 2014	voice vote	December 19, 2014	Incumbent	–
245	Amos Mazzant	E.D. Tex.	June 26, 2014	December 16, 2014	voice vote	December 19, 2014	Incumbent	–
246	Robert L. Pitman	W.D. Tex.	June 26, 2014	December 16, 2014	voice vote	December 19, 2014	Incumbent	–
247	Robert W. Schroeder III	E.D. Tex.	June 26, 2014	December 16, 2014	voice vote	December 19, 2014	Incumbent	–
248	Joan Azrack	E.D.N.Y.	September 18, 2014	December 16, 2014	voice vote	December 19, 2014	December 19, 2024	Incumbent
249	Elizabeth K. Dillon	W.D. Va.	September 18, 2014	December 16, 2014	voice vote	December 19, 2014	Incumbent	–
250	Loretta Copeland Biggs	M.D.N.C.	September 18, 2014	December 16, 2014	voice vote	December 19, 2014	December 31, 2024	Incumbent
251	Alfred H. Bennett	S.D. Tex.	September 18, 2014	April 13, 2015	95–0	April 15, 2015	Incumbent	–
252	George C. Hanks Jr.	S.D. Tex.	September 18, 2014	April 20, 2015	91–0	April 22, 2015	Incumbent	–
253	Jill Parrish	D. Utah	September 18, 2014	May 21, 2015	100–0	August 17, 2015	Incumbent	–
254	Rolando Olvera	S.D. Tex.	September 18, 2014	May 21, 2015	100–0	August 4, 2015	Incumbent	–
255	Roseann A. Ketchmark	W.D. Mo.	November 20, 2014	September 8, 2015	96–0	September 14, 2015	Incumbent	–
256	Dale A. Drozd	E.D. Cal.	November 12, 2014	October 5, 2015	69–21	November 2, 2015	Incumbent	–
257	Ann Donnelly	E.D.N.Y.	November 20, 2014	October 20, 2015	95–2	October 21, 2015	Incumbent	–
258	Lawrence J. Vilardo	W.D.N.Y.	February 4, 2015	October 26, 2015	88–0	October 29, 2015	Incumbent	–
259	LaShann DeArcy Hall	E.D.N.Y.	November 12, 2014	November 16, 2015	93–1	November 17, 2015	Incumbent	–
260	Travis R. McDonough	E.D. Tenn.	November 20, 2014	December 7, 2015	89–0	December 10, 2015	Incumbent	–
261	Wilhelmina Wright	D. Minn.	April 15, 2015	January 19, 2016	58–36	February 18, 2016	February 15, 2024	Incumbent
262	John Michael Vazquez	D.N.J.	March 26, 2015	January 27, 2016	84–2	January 29, 2016	September 8, 2023	–
263	Rebecca Goodgame Ebinger	S.D. Iowa	September 15, 2015	February 8, 2016	83–0	February 16, 2016	Incumbent	–
264	Leonard T. Strand	N.D. Iowa	July 21, 2015	February 11, 2016	93–0	February 12, 2016	Incumbent	–
265	Waverly D. Crenshaw Jr.	M.D. Tenn.	February 4, 2015	April 11, 2016	92–0	April 12, 2016	Incumbent	–
266	Paula Xinis	D. Md.	March 26, 2015	May 16, 2016	53–34	May 18, 2016	Incumbent	–
267	Robert F. Rossiter Jr.	D. Neb.	June 11, 2015	June 27, 2016	90–0	June 29, 2016	Incumbent	–
268	Brian R. Martinotti	D.N.J.	June 11, 2015	July 6, 2016	92–5	July 11, 2016	Incumbent	–

== United States Court of International Trade (Article III) ==
#	Judge	Nomination date	Confirmation date	Confirmation vote	Began active service	Ended active service	Ended senior status
1	Mark A. Barnett	July 12, 2012	May 23, 2013	voice vote	May 28, 2013	Incumbent	–
2	Claire R. Kelly	November 14, 2012	May 23, 2013	voice vote	May 28, 2013	Incumbent	–
3	Jennifer Choe-Groves	July 30, 2015	June 6, 2016	voice vote	June 8, 2016	Incumbent	–
4	Gary Katzmann	July 30, 2015	June 6, 2016	voice vote	September 15, 2016	Incumbent	–

== Specialty courts (Article I) ==
=== United States Court of Federal Claims ===
#	Judge	Nomination date	Confirmation date	Confirmation vote	Began active service	Ended active service	Ended senior status
1	Elaine D. Kaplan	March 19, 2013	September 17, 2013	64–35	November 6, 2013	Incumbent	–
2	Patricia E. Campbell-Smith	March 19, 2013	September 17, 2013	voice vote	September 19, 2013	September 30, 2023	–
3	Lydia Griggsby	April 10, 2014	December 4, 2014	voice vote	December 5, 2014	July 23, 2021	Elevated

=== United States Tax Court ===
#	Judge	Nomination date	Confirmation date	Confirmation vote	Began active service	Ended active service	Ended senior status
1	Maurice B. Foley	December 6, 2010	September 26, 2011	voice vote	November 25, 2011	March 29, 2025	Incumbent
2	Juan F. Vasquez	August 5, 2010 (Note: Renominated on January 26, 2011, after the initial nomination expired.)	September 26, 2011	voice vote	October 13, 2011	June 24, 2018	Incumbent
3	Joseph H. Gale	July 11, 2011	September 26, 2011	voice vote	October 18, 2011	Incumbent	–
4	Kathleen Kerrigan	May 26, 2011	March 29, 2012	voice vote	May 4, 2012	Incumbent	–
5	Albert G. Lauber	May 26, 2011	January 1, 2013	voice vote	January 31, 2013	January 1, 2020	Incumbent
6	Ronald L. Buch	September 15, 2011	January 1, 2013	voice vote	January 14, 2013	Incumbent	–
7	Joseph W. Nega	May 9, 2013	August 1, 2013	voice vote	September 4, 2013	Incumbent	–
8	Michael B. Thornton	May 9, 2013	August 1, 2013	voice vote	August 7, 2013	January 1, 2021	Incumbent
9	Tamara W. Ashford	September 18, 2013	November 20, 2014	voice vote	December 19, 2014	Incumbent	–
10	L. Paige Marvel	July 31, 2013	November 20, 2014	voice vote	December 3, 2014	December 6, 2019	Incumbent
11	Cary Douglas Pugh	June 9, 2014	November 20, 2014	voice vote	December 16, 2014	Incumbent	–

=== United States Court of Appeals for Veterans Claims ===
#	Judge	Nomination date	Confirmation date	Confirmation vote	Began active service	Ended active service	Ended senior status
1	Margaret Bartley	June 21, 2011	May 24, 2012	voice vote	June 28, 2012	Incumbent	–
2	Coral Wong Pietsch	November 1, 2011	May 24, 2012	voice vote	June 28, 2012	Incumbent	–
3	William S. Greenberg	November 15, 2012	December 21, 2012	voice vote	December 28, 2012	March 16, 2026	–

=== United States Court of Appeals for the Armed Forces ===
#	Judge	Nomination date	Confirmation date	Confirmation vote	Began active service	Ended active service	Ended senior status
1	Kevin A. Ohlson	September 15, 2011 (Note: Renominated on March 21, 2013.)	October 16, 2013	voice vote	November 1, 2013	Incumbent	–
2	John E. Sparks	July 30, 2015	April 5, 2016	voice vote	April 19, 2016	Incumbent	–

=== United States Court of Military Commission Review ===
#	Judge	Nomination date	Confirmation date	Confirmation vote	Began active service	Ended active service	Ended senior status
1	William B. Pollard III	November 10, 2011	June 21, 2012	voice vote	September 14, 2012	Incumbent	–
2	Scott Silliman	November 10, 2011	June 21, 2012	voice vote	September 12, 2012	Incumbent	–

== Territorial courts (Article IV) ==
#	Judge	Court	Nomination date	Confirmation date	Confirmation vote	Began active service	Ended active service	Ended senior status
1	Ramona Villagomez Manglona	D. N. Mar. I.	January 26, 2011	July 26, 2011	voice vote	July 29, 2011	Incumbent	–
2	Wilma A. Lewis	D.V.I.	March 2, 2011	June 30, 2011	voice vote	August 1, 2011	February 15, 2025	Incumbent

== See also ==
- Federal Judicial Center
- Barack Obama judicial appointment controversies
- Barack Obama Supreme Court candidates

== Notes ==
Courts

Renominations
