= Charles Siragusa =

Charles Siragusa may refer to:

- Charles J. Siragusa (born 1947), American judge
- Charlie Siragusa (1913–1982), American federal narcotics agent
