= John Oliver Henderson =

American judge

Chief Judge of the United States District Court for the Western District of New York
- In office 1967–1974
- Preceded by: Harold P. Burke
- Succeeded by: John Thomas Curtin

Judge of the United States District Court for the Western District of New York
- In office September 21, 1959 – February 19, 1974
- Appointed by: Dwight D. Eisenhower
- Preceded by: Justin C. Morgan
- Succeeded by: John T. Elfvin

Personal details
- Born: John Oliver Henderson; November 13, 1909 Buffalo, New York, U.S.
- Died: February 19, 1974 (aged 64)
- Education: University of Buffalo Law School (LL.B.)

John Oliver Henderson (November 13, 1909 – February 19, 1974) was a United States district judge of the United States District Court for the Western District of New York from 1959 to 1974 and its Chief Judge from 1967 to 1974.

== Education and career ==
Born in Buffalo, New York, Henderson received a Bachelor of Laws from the University of Buffalo Law School in 1933. He was in the United States Army during World War II, from 1942 to 1946, achieving the rank of lieutenant colonel. He returned to private practice in Buffalo, and was a clerk of the Surrogate Court of Erie County, New York from 1947 to 1948. He was the United States Attorney for the Western District of New York from 1953 to 1959.

== Federal judicial service ==
On August 21, 1959, Henderson was nominated by President Dwight D. Eisenhower to a seat on the United States District Court for the Western District of New York vacated by Judge Justin C. Morgan. Henderson was confirmed by the United States Senate on September 14, 1959, and received his commission on September 21, 1959. He served as Chief Judge from 1967 until his death on February 19, 1974.

== Sources ==
Legal offices
Preceded by Justin C. Morgan	Judge of the United States District Court for the Western District of New York; 1959–1974	Succeeded by John T. Elfvin
Preceded by Harold P. Burke	Chief Judge of the United States District Court for the Western District of New York; 1967–1974	Succeeded by John Thomas Curtin
