= Roseann A. Ketchmark =

American judge (born 1963)

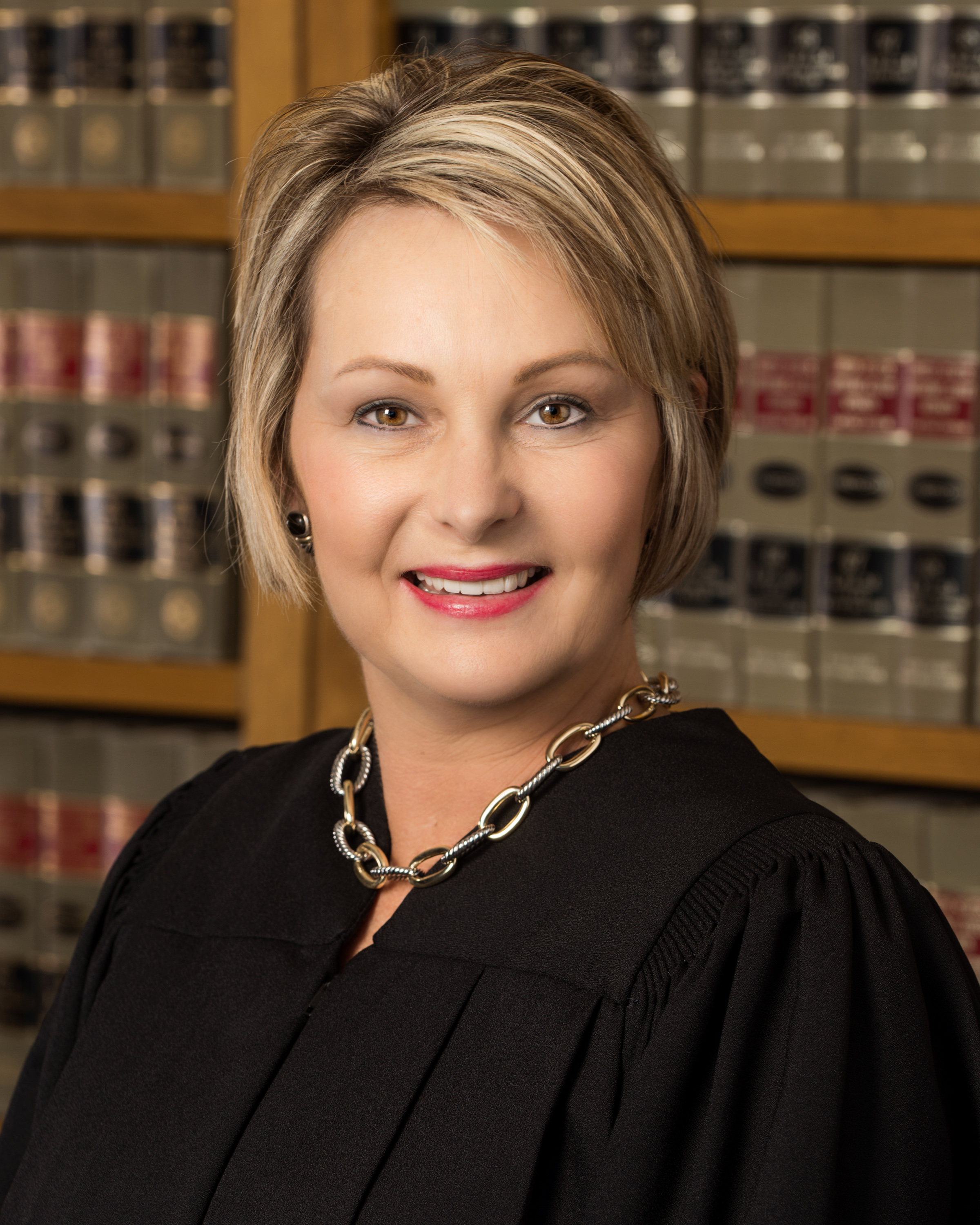

Judge of the United States District Court for the Western District of Missouri
- Incumbent
- Assumed office September 14, 2015
- Appointed by: Barack Obama
- Preceded by: Gary A. Fenner

Personal details
- Born: Roseann Ambrosia Smith; 1963 (age 62–63) Lindsay, Oklahoma, U.S.
- Party: Democratic Party
- Education: University of Oklahoma (BSN); University of Kansas (JD)

Roseann Ambrosia Ketchmark (née Smith; born 1963) is a United States district judge of the United States District Court for the Western District of Missouri and a former assistant United States attorney.

== Early life and education ==
Ketchmark was born in Lindsay, Oklahoma, in 1963. She received a Bachelor of Science in Nursing degree from the University of Oklahoma in 1986. After graduating from nursing school, she worked as a registered nurse at Lindsay Municipal Hospital, North Kansas City Hospital, and as a temporary nurse for a nurse staffing organization in Kansas City. In 1990, She received a Juris Doctor from the University of Kansas School of Law.

== Career ==
She began her career as an assistant prosecutor in Jackson County, from 1990 to 1995. From 1995 to 2001, she was first assistant prosecutor in Platte County. From 2001 to 2015, she served as an assistant United States attorney in the Western District of Missouri. She served as first assistant United States attorney from 2001 to 2006 and again from 2009 to 2010. She served as executive assistant United States attorney from 2006 to 2007 and again in 2010. She served in the Fraud and Corruption Unit.

=== Federal judicial service ===
On November 20, 2014, President Barack Obama nominated Ketchmark to serve as a United States district judge of the United States District Court for the Western District of Missouri, to the seat vacated by Judge Gary A. Fenner, who at the time was going to assume senior status on a date to be determined. He eventually assumed senior status after Ketchmark was confirmed on September 8, 2015. On December 16, 2014, her nomination was returned to the President due to the sine die adjournment of the 113th Congress. On January 7, 2015, President Obama renominated her to the same position. She received a hearing on her nomination on March 11, 2015. On April 23, 2015, her nomination was reported out of committee by a voice vote. On September 8, 2015, the United States Senate confirmed her by a 96–0 vote. She received her judicial commission on September 14, 2015.

Legal offices
| Preceded by Gary A. Fenner | Judge of the United States District Court for the Western District of Missouri; 2015–present | Incumbent |
