= John T. Elfvin =

American judge (1917–2009)

Senior Judge of the United States District Court for the Western District of New York
- In office July 1, 1987 – January 6, 2009

Judge of the United States District Court for the Western District of New York
- In office December 21, 1974 – July 1, 1987
- Appointed by: Gerald Ford
- Preceded by: John Oliver Henderson
- Succeeded by: Richard Arcara

Personal details
- Born: John Thomas Elfvin; June 30, 1917 Montour Falls, New York, U.S.
- Died: January 6, 2009 (aged 91) Lancaster, New York, U.S.
- Education: Cornell University (B.E.E.); Georgetown Law (J.D.)

John Thomas Elfvin (June 30, 1917 – January 6, 2009) was an American lawyer and jurist who was a United States district judge of the United States District Court for the Western District of New York.

== Early life and education ==
Born in Montour Falls, New York, Elfvin received his Bachelor of Electrical Engineering degree from Cornell University in 1942 and was a member of Phi Kappa Tau fraternity there. He earned his Juris Doctor in 1947 from the Georgetown Law school following service in the United States Navy as an electrical engineer in the Bureau of Ships during World War II, from 1943 to 1946.

== Career ==
Elfvin clerked for Judge E. Barrett Prettyman of the United States Court of Appeals for the District of Columbia Circuit from 1947 to 1948. After private practice in New York City at Cravath, Swaine & Moore, and for several firms in Buffalo, New York, he worked for three years as assistant United States attorney from 1955 to 1958. He returned to private practice in Buffalo from 1958 to 1969 during which time he was a member of the Board of Supervisors for Erie County, a member of the Buffalo Common Council. He was the minority leader in 1966. Elfvin spent one year on the Supreme Court of New York in 1969 and returned to private practice before becoming United States attorney for the Western District of New York in 1972.

== Federal judicial service ==
On December 9, 1974, Elfvin was nominated by President Gerald Ford to a seat on the United States District Court for the Western District of New York vacated by Judge John Oliver Henderson. Elfvin was confirmed by the United States Senate on December 20, 1974, and received his commission the following day. Elfvin assumed senior status on July 1, 1987, and took inactive senior status on October 5, 2007, meaning that while he remained a federal judge, he no longer heard cases or participated in the business of the court.

== Death ==
Elfvin died on January 6, 2009, at a Lancaster, New York, nursing home. He was survived by his wife (since 1960), the former Peggy Pierce, who died in 2012.

Legal offices
Preceded by John Oliver Henderson	Judge of the United States District Court for the Western District of New York; 1974–1987	Succeeded by Richard Arcara
