= United States District Court for the Western District of New York =

United States federal district court in New York (U.S. state)

Coordinates: 42.8875°N 78.8784°W

- (W.D.N.Y.)
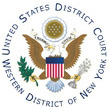

- Location: Robert H. Jackson U.S. Courthouse (Buffalo) More locations: Rochester; Canandaigua; Elmira; Jamestown
- Appeals to: Second Circuit
- Established: May 12, 1900
- Judges: 4
- Chief Judge: Elizabeth A. Wolford

Officers of the court
- U.S. Attorney: Michael DiGiacomo
- U.S. Marshal: Charles Salina
- www.nywd.uscourts.gov

The United States District Court for the Western District of New York (in case citations, W.D.N.Y.) is the federal district court whose jurisdiction comprises the western parts of Upstate New York.

Appeals are taken to the Second Circuit (except for patent claims and claims against the U.S. government under the Tucker Act, which are appealed to the Federal Circuit).

== Jurisdiction ==
The Western District of New York includes the following counties: Allegany, Cattaraugus, Chautauqua, Chemung, Erie, Genesee, Livingston, Monroe, Niagara, Ontario, Orleans, Schuyler, Seneca, Steuben, Wayne, Wyoming, and Yates. Cities within its jurisdiction include Buffalo, Rochester, and Elmira. From 1904 to 1916, the court met at the United States Post Office (Lockport, New York).

Buffalo Division comprises the following counties: Allegany, Cattaraugus, Chautauqua, Erie, Genesee, Niagara, Orleans, and Wyoming.

Rochester Division comprises the following counties: Chemung, Livingston, Monroe, Ontario, Schuyler, Seneca, Steuben, Wayne, and Yates.

The United States government is represented in the district by the United States Attorney for the Western District of New York. As of February 22, 2025 the U.S. attorney is Joel L. Violanti.

== Current judges ==
As of January 5, 2026:

#	Title	Judge	Duty station	Born	Term of service			Appointed by
#	Title	Judge	Duty station	Born	Active	Chief	Senior	Appointed by
16	Chief Judge	Elizabeth A. Wolford	Rochester	1966	2013–present	2021–present	—	Obama
17	District Judge	Lawrence J. Vilardo	Buffalo	1955	2015–present	—	—	Obama
18	District Judge	John Sinatra	Buffalo	1972	2019–present	—	—	Trump
19	District Judge	Meredith Vacca	Rochester	1980	2024–present	—	—	Biden
11	Senior Judge	David G. Larimer	inactive	1944	1987–2009	1996–2002	2009–present	Reagan
12	Senior Judge	Richard Arcara	Buffalo	1940	1988–2015	2003–2010	2015–present	Reagan
13	Senior Judge	William M. Skretny	inactive	1945	1990–2015	2010–2015	2015–present	G.H.W. Bush
14	Senior Judge	Charles J. Siragusa	Rochester	1947	1997–2012	—	2012–present	Clinton
15	Senior Judge	Frank P. Geraci Jr.	Rochester	1951	2013–2023	2015–2021	2023–present	Obama

== Former judges ==
#	Judge	Born–died	Active service	Chief Judge	Senior status	Appointed by	Reason for termination
1	John R. Hazel	1860–1951	1900–1931	—	—	McKinley	retirement
2	Simon L. Adler	1867–1934	1927–1934 (Note: Recess appointment; formally nominated on December 6, 1927, confirmed by the United States Senate on January 16, 1928, and received commission the same day.)	—	—	Coolidge	death
3	John Knight	1871–1955	1931–1955 (Note: Recess appointment; formally nominated on December 15, 1931, confirmed by the Senate on January 6, 1932, and received commission on January 9, 1932.)	1948–1955	—	Hoover	death
4	Harlan W. Rippey	1874–1946	1934–1936	—	—	F. Roosevelt	resignation
5	Harold P. Burke	1895–1981	1937–1981	1955–1967	1981	F. Roosevelt	death
6	Justin C. Morgan	1900–1959	1956–1959	—	—	Eisenhower	death
7	John Oliver Henderson	1909–1974	1959–1974	1967–1974	—	Eisenhower	death
8	John Thomas Curtin	1921–2017	1967–1989	1974–1989	1989–2017	L. Johnson	death
9	John T. Elfvin	1917–2009	1974–1987	—	1987–2009	Ford	death
10	Michael Anthony Telesca	1929–2020	1982–1996	1989–1995	1996–2020	Reagan	death

== Chief judges ==
Chief Judge
Knight	1948–1955
Burke	1955–1967
Henderson	1967–1974
Curtin	1974–1989
Telesca	1989–1995
Larimer	1996–2002
Arcara	2003–2010
Skretny	2010–2015
Geraci	2015–2021
Wolford	2021–present

Chief judges have administrative responsibilities with respect to their district court. Unlike the Supreme Court, where one justice is specifically nominated to be chief, the office of chief judge rotates among the district court judges. To be chief, a judge must have been in active service on the court for at least one year, be under the age of 65, and have not previously served as chief judge.

A vacancy is filled by the judge highest in seniority among the group of qualified judges. The chief judge serves for a term of seven years, or until age 70, whichever occurs first. The age restrictions are waived if no members of the court would otherwise be qualified for the position.

When the office was created in 1948, the chief judge was the longest-serving judge who had not elected to retire, on what has since 1958 been known as senior status, or declined to serve as chief judge. After August 6, 1959, judges could not become or remain chief after turning 70 years old. The current rules have been in operation since October 1, 1982.

== Succession of seats ==
Seat 1
Seat established on May 12, 1900 by 31 Stat. 175
Hazel	1900–1931
Knight	1931–1955
Morgan	1956–1959
Henderson	1959–1974
Elfvin	1974–1987
Arcara	1988–2015
Vilardo	2015–present

Seat 2
Seat established on March 3, 1927 by 44 Stat. 1370
Adler	1927–1934
Rippey	1934–1936
Burke	1937–1981
Telesca	1982–1996
Siragusa	1997–2012
Wolford	2013–present

Seat 3
Seat established on March 18, 1966 by 80 Stat. 75
Curtin	1967–1989
Skretny	1990–2015
Sinatra, Jr.	2019–present

Seat 4
Seat established on July 10, 1984 by 98 Stat. 333 (temporary)
Seat made permanent on December 1, 1990 by 104 Stat. 1589
Larimer	1987–2009
Geraci	2013–2023
Vacca	2024–present

== See also ==
- Courts of New York
- List of current United States district judges
- List of United States federal courthouses in New York
