= John Sinatra =

American judge (born 1972)

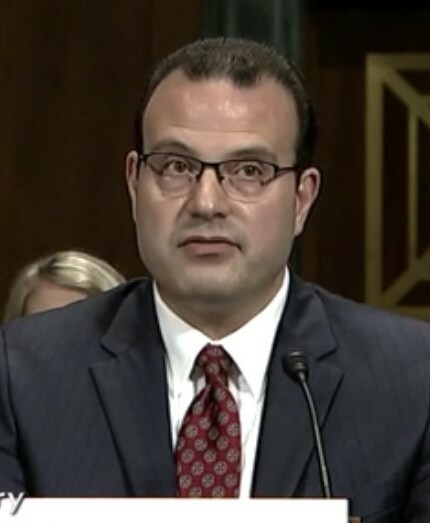

Judge of the United States District Court for the Western District of New York
- Incumbent
- Assumed office December 5, 2019
- Appointed by: Donald Trump
- Preceded by: William M. Skretny

Personal details
- Born: John Leonard Sinatra Jr. 1972 (age 52–53) Buffalo, New York, U.S.
- Education: University at Buffalo (BA, JD)

John Leonard Sinatra Jr. (born 1972) is a United States district judge of the United States District Court for the Western District of New York.

== Education and career ==
Sinatra received a Bachelor of Arts degree, magna cum laude, in 1993 from the University at Buffalo. He received his Juris Doctor, cum laude, in 1996 from the University at Buffalo Law School. He was a law clerk for the New York Court of Appeals from 1996 to 1998. Sinatra litigated at Jones Day, then was appointed to the General Counsel Office of the United States Department of Commerce, where he was the third ranking lawyer in the 400 attorney department. He then came to Hodgson Russ LLP, and served as a partner in the firm's Buffalo, New York, office.

== Federal judicial service ==
On May 15, 2018, Sinatra was nominated by President Donald Trump to serve as a United States District Judge of the United States District Court for the Western District of New York, to the seat vacated by Judge William M. Skretny, who assumed senior status on March 8, 2015. Sinatra was recommended to President Trump by United States Representative Chris Collins and his nomination was agreed to by United States Senator Chuck Schumer. On August 1, 2018, a hearing on his nomination was held before the Senate Judiciary Committee. On September 13, 2018, his nomination was reported out of committee by a 16–5 vote.

On January 3, 2019, his nomination was returned to the President under Rule XXXI, Paragraph 6 of the United States Senate. On April 8, 2019, President Trump announced the renomination of Sinatra to the district court. On May 21, 2019, his nomination was sent to the Senate. On June 20, 2019, his nomination was reported out of committee by a 16–6 vote. On December 3, 2019, the Senate invoked cloture on his nomination by a 76–16 vote. On December 4, 2019, his nomination was confirmed by a 75–18 vote. He received his judicial commission on December 5, 2019. He was sworn in on December 6, 2019.

== Memberships ==
He has been a member of the Federalist Society since 1993.

Legal offices
Preceded by William M. Skretny	Judge of the United States District Court for the Western District of New York; 2019–present	Incumbent
