= Meredith Vacca =

American judge (born 1980)

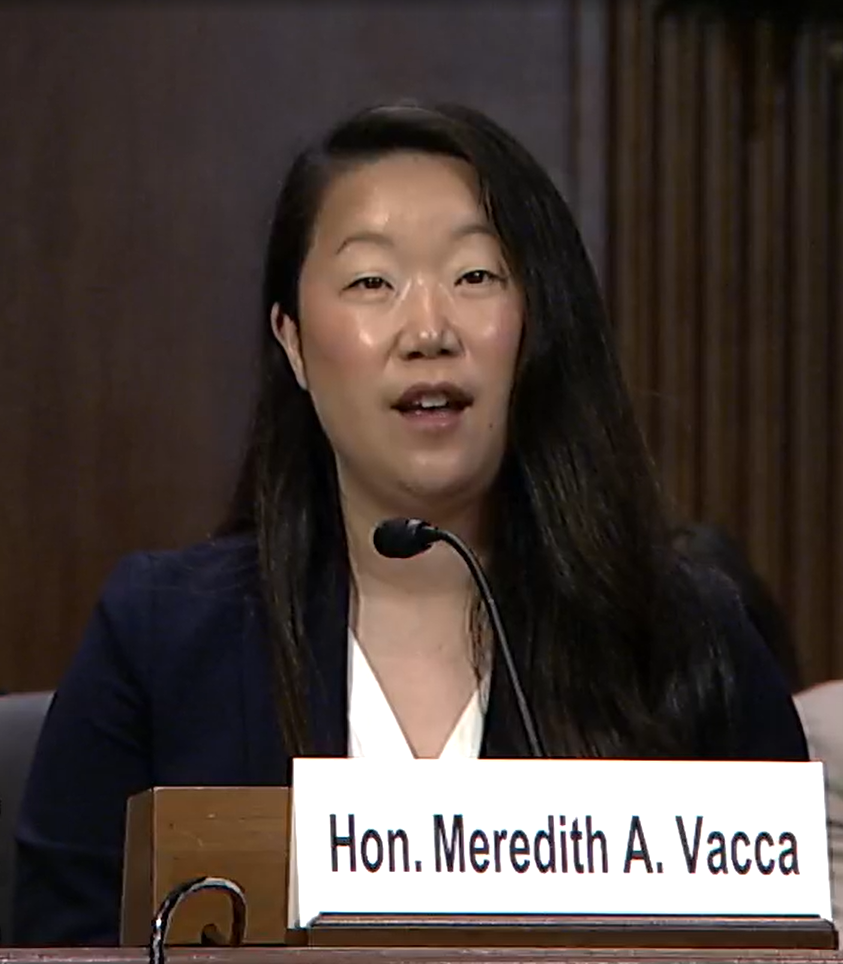

Judge of the United States District Court for the Western District of New York
- Incumbent
- Assumed office August 1, 2024
- Appointed by: Joe Biden
- Preceded by: Frank P. Geraci Jr.

Judge of the Monroe County Court
- In office 2021 – August 1, 2024

Personal details
- Born: Meredith Anne Vacca; 1980 (age 45–46) Busan, South Korea
- Party: Democratic
- Parent: Paul Vacca (father)
- Education: Colgate University (BA); University at Buffalo (JD)

Meredith Anne Vacca (born 1980) is an American lawyer who has served as a United States district judge of the United States District Court for the Western District of New York since 2024. She previously served as a judge on the Monroe County Court from 2021 to 2024 and an acting justice on the New York Supreme Court from 2023 to 2024.

== Education ==
Vacca received a Bachelor of Arts from Colgate University in 2002 and a Juris Doctor from the University at Buffalo School of Law in 2005.

== Career ==
From 2005 to 2007, she was as an associate at Hamberger & Weiss LLP in Buffalo. From 2007 to 2020, she worked as an assistant district attorney in the District Attorney's Office for Monroe County in Rochester, New York. In 2020, she was elected as judge of the Monroe County Court, becoming the only Asian American judge on the bench in the seventh judicial district. She was elected in 2021 to serve as a judge on the Monroe County Court. She was an acting justice on the New York Supreme Court from 2023 to 2024.

=== Federal judicial service ===
Senator Chuck Schumer recommended Vacca to the Biden administration. On May 8, 2024, President Joe Biden announced his intent to nominate Vacca to serve as a United States district judge of the United States District Court for the Western District of New York. On May 14, 2024, her nomination was sent to the Senate. President Biden nominated Vacca to the seat vacated by Judge Frank P. Geraci Jr., who assumed senior status on April 1, 2023. On June 5, 2024, a hearing on her nomination was held before the Senate Judiciary Committee. During her confirmation hearing, she was questioned by Senator John Kennedy about a 2020 radio interview in which she said that the U.S. criminal justice system is institutionally racist. On July 11, 2024, her nomination was reported out of committee by a 12–9 vote. On July 31, 2024, the United States Senate invoked cloture on her nomination by a 51–43 vote. Later that day, her nomination was confirmed by a 50–41 vote. She received her judicial commission on August 1, 2024. She was sworn in on August 5, 2024. She became the first Asian American on the court.

== Personal life ==
Vacca was born in Busan, South Korea. She was adopted at 6 months old and raised in Greece, New York. Her father is Paul Vacca, a criminal defense attorney in Rochester, New York.

== Electoral history ==
2020 Monroe County Court Judge election
Party	Candidate	Votes	%
Democratic	Meredith Vacca	217,532	61.32%
Republican	Derek Harnsberger	137,191	38.68%
Total votes		354,723	100.0%
Democratic gain from Republican			

== See also ==
- List of Asian American jurists

Legal offices
Preceded by Frank P. Geraci Jr.	Judge of the United States District Court for the Western District of New York; 2024–present	Incumbent
