= Lawrence J. Vilardo =

American judge (born 1955)

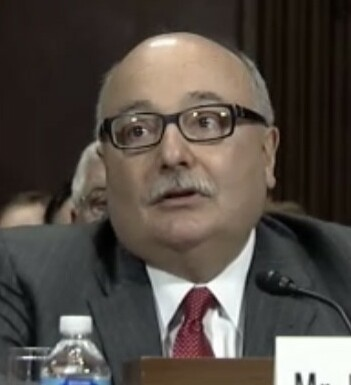
- Vilardo in 2015

Judge of the United States District Court for the Western District of New York
- Incumbent
- Assumed office October 29, 2015
- Appointed by: Barack Obama
- Preceded by: Richard Arcara

Personal details
- Born: Lawrence Joseph Vilardo; 1955 (age 70–71) Buffalo, New York, U.S.
- Education: Canisius College (BA); Harvard University (JD)

Lawrence Joseph Vilardo (born 1955) is a United States district judge of the United States District Court for the Western District of New York.

== Biography ==
Vilardo was born in 1955, in Buffalo, New York. He graduated from Canisius High School and then received a Bachelor of Arts summa cum laude, in 1977 from Canisius College. He received a Juris Doctor magna cum laude, in 1980 from Harvard Law School. He served as a law clerk to Judge Irving Loeb Goldberg of the United States Court of Appeals for the Fifth Circuit, from 1980 to 1981. From 1981 to 1986, he was an associate at the law firm of Damon Morey LLP in their Buffalo office. From 1986 to 2015, he was a founding partner of the law firm of Connors & Vilardo, LLP., in Buffalo, where he conducted a wide range of civil and criminal litigation in State and Federal courts at the trial and appellate levels.

=== Federal judicial service ===
On February 4, 2015, President Barack Obama, on the recommendation of Senator Chuck Schumer, nominated Vilardo to serve as a United States district judge of the United States District Court for the Western District of New York, to the seat vacated by Judge Richard Arcara, who assumed senior status on January 3, 2015. He received a hearing before the United States Senate Judiciary Committee on May 6, 2015. On June 4, 2015, his nomination was reported out of committee by a voice vote. On October 26, 2015, the United States Senate confirmed his nomination by a 88–0 vote. He received his judicial commission on October 29, 2015.

== See also ==
- List of Hispanic and Latino American jurists

Legal offices
Preceded by Richard Arcara	Judge of the United States District Court for the Western District of New York; 2015–present	Incumbent
