= Simon L. Adler =

American judge (1867–1934)

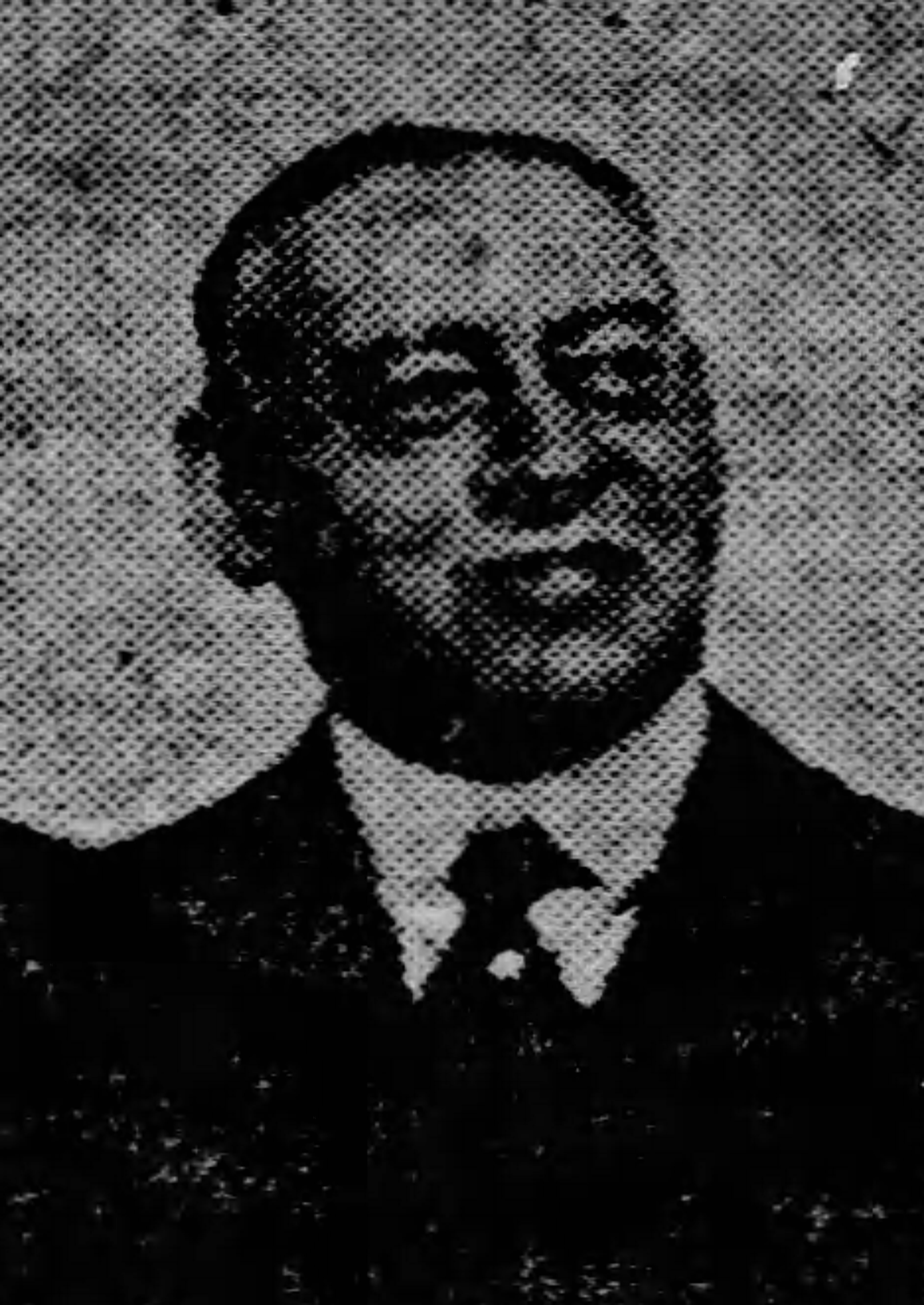

Judge of the United States District Court for the Western District of New York
- In office May 19, 1927 – May 23, 1934
- Appointed by: Calvin Coolidge
- Preceded by: Seat established by 44 Stat. 1370
- Succeeded by: Harlan W. Rippey

Member of the New York State Assembly from the Monroe County, 2nd district
- In office January 1, 1911 – December 31, 1926
- Preceded by: James L. Whitley
- Succeeded by: Harry J. McKay

Personal details
- Born: Simon Louis Adler; August 30, 1867 Seneca Falls, New York, U.S.
- Died: May 23, 1934 (aged 66)
- Education: Cornell University (B.L.); Harvard Law School

Simon Louis Adler (August 30, 1867 – May 23, 1934) was a United States district judge of the United States District Court for the Western District of New York.

== Education and career ==
Born on August 30, 1867, in Seneca Falls, New York, Adler received a Bachelor of Laws from Cornell University in 1889, and graduated from Harvard Law School in 1892. He practiced law in Rochester, New York. Adler was a member of the New York State Assembly (Monroe Co., 2nd D.) in the 134th New York State Legislature through the 149th New York State Legislature, from 1911 to 1926, and was Chairman of the Committee on Banks in 1915, and Majority Leader from 1916 to 1926.

== Federal judicial service ==
Adler received a recess appointment from President Calvin Coolidge on May 19, 1927, to the United States District Court for the Western District of New York, to a new seat authorized by 44 Stat. 1370. He was nominated to the same position by President Coolidge on December 6, 1927. He was confirmed by the United States Senate on January 16, 1928, and received his commission the same day. His service terminated on May 23, 1934, due to his death.

== Sources ==
New York State Assembly
| Preceded by James L. Whitley | New York State Assembly Monroe County, 2nd District; 1911–1926 | Succeeded by Harry J. McKay |
Political offices
| Preceded by Harold J. Hinman | Majority Leader of the New York State Assembly; 1916–1926 | Succeeded by Russell G. Dunmore |
Legal offices
| Preceded by Seat established by 44 Stat. 1370 | Judge of the United States District Court for the Western District of New York; 1927–1934 | Succeeded by Harlan W. Rippey |
