= Courts of New York =

Courts of New York include:

State courts of New York

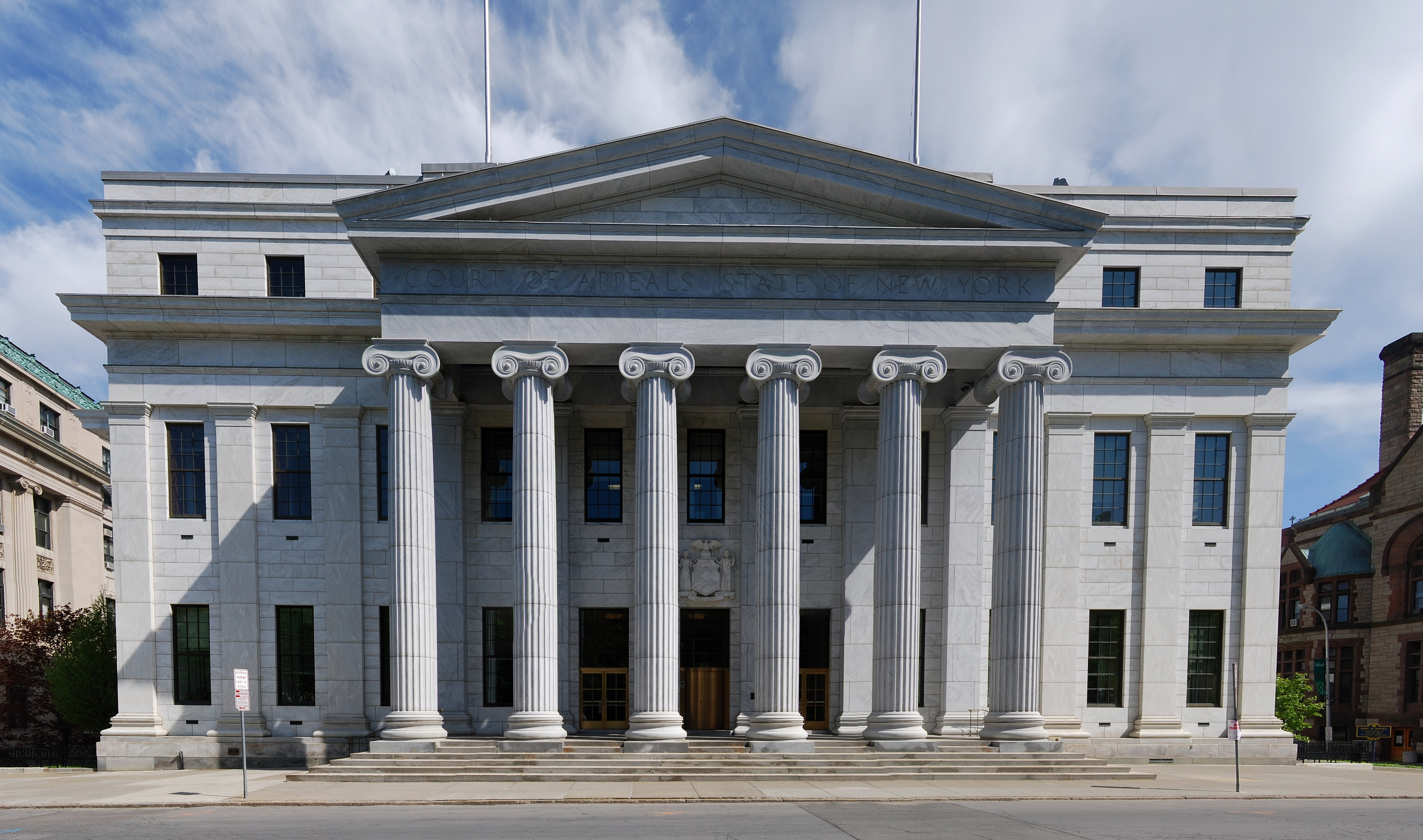
The 1842 courthouse of the New York Court of Appeals in Albany

- New York Court of Appeals
  - New York Supreme Court, Appellate Division (4 departments)
    - New York Supreme Court (13 judicial districts)
    - New York County Court (57 courts, one for each county outside New York City)
    - New York Surrogate's Court
    - New York Family Court
    - New York Court of Claims
    - New York City courts
      - New York City Criminal Court
      - New York City Civil Court
    - New York District Court
    - New York town and village courts

Federal courts located in New York

- United States Court of Appeals for the Second Circuit (headquartered in Manhattan, having jurisdiction over the United States District Courts of Connecticut, New York, and Vermont)
  - United States District Court for the Eastern District of New York
  - United States District Court for the Northern District of New York
  - United States District Court for the Southern District of New York
  - United States District Court for the Western District of New York
- United States Court of International Trade (headquartered in New York City)

Former federal courts of New York

- United States District Court for the District of New York (extinct, subdivided)

== See also ==
- Judiciary of New York
- New York Court of Common Pleas (historical)
- New York Court for the Trial of Impeachments (historical)
- New York Court of Chancery (historical)
- New York Court of General Sessions (historical)
