= United States Post Office (Lockport, New York) =

- US Post Office--Lockport
- U.S. National Register of Historic Places
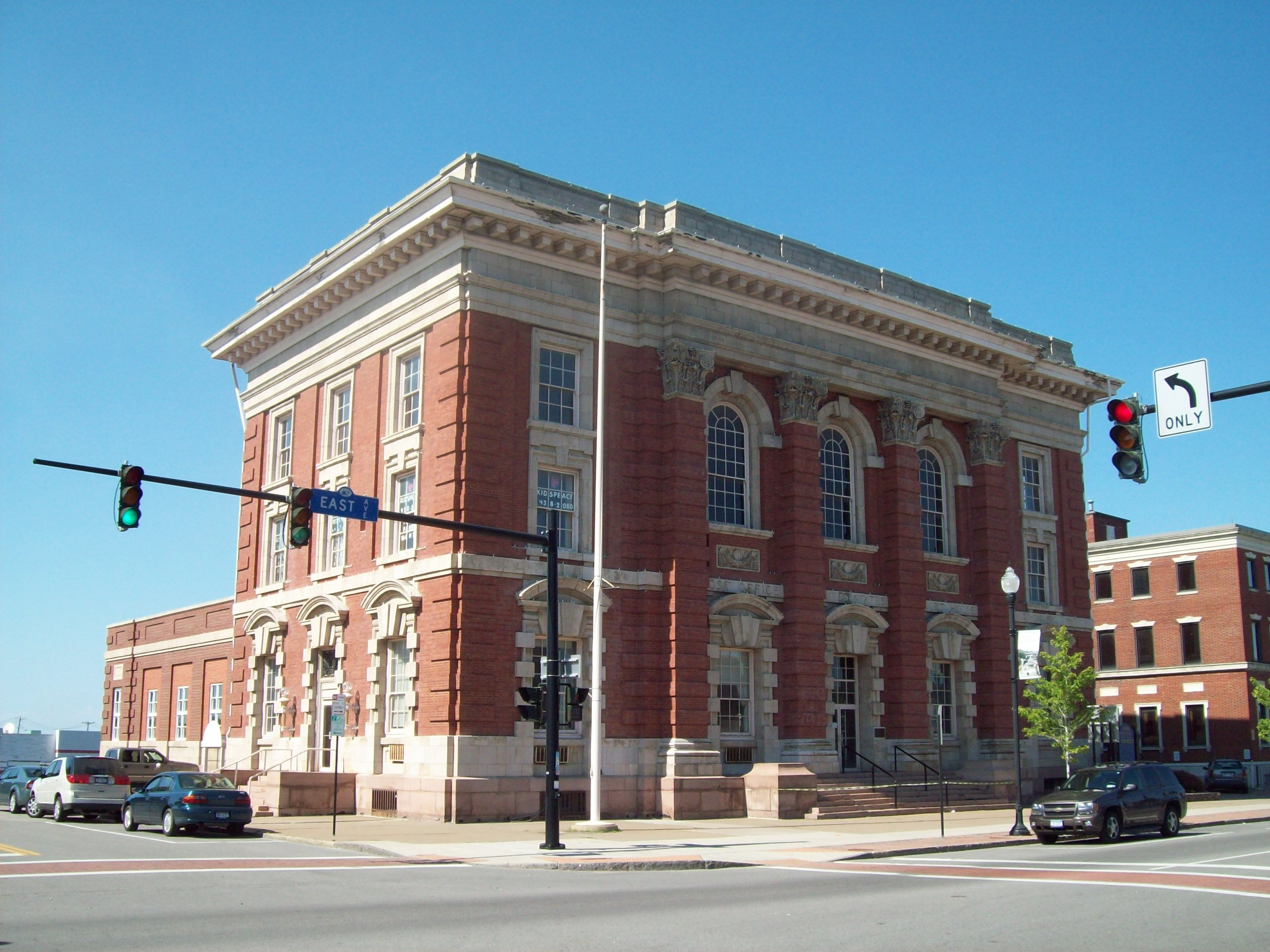
- US Post Office-Lockport, June 2009

- Location within New York Location within the United States
- Location: 1 East Ave., Lockport, New York
- Coordinates: 43°10′16″N 78°41′18″W
- Built: 1902
- Architect: Taylor, James Knox; US Treasury Department
- Architectural style: Beaux Arts
- MPS: US Post Offices in New York State, 1858-1943, TR
- NRHP reference No.: 88002345
- Added to NRHP: May 11, 1989

The United States Post Office is a historic post office building located at Lockport in Niagara County, New York. It was designed and built 1902–1904, and is one of a number of post offices in New York State designed by the Office of the Supervising Architect of the Treasury Department, James Knox Taylor. It is a three-story brick and limestone structure in the Beaux-Arts style. The United States District Court for the Western District of New York met here from 1904 until 1916.

It was listed on the National Register of Historic Places in 1989.
