= Harlan W. Rippey =

American judge (1874–1946)

Judge of the United States District Court for the Western District of New York
- In office June 18, 1934 – December 31, 1936
- Appointed by: Franklin D. Roosevelt
- Preceded by: Simon L. Adler
- Succeeded by: Harold P. Burke

Personal details
- Born: Harlan Watson Rippey; September 8, 1874 Livingston County, New York, U.S.
- Died: March 11, 1946 (aged 71) Rochester, New York, U.S.
- Education: University of Rochester (A.B., A.M.)

Harlan Watson Rippey (September 8, 1874 – March 11, 1946) was a United States district judge of the United States District Court for the Western District of New York.

== Education and career ==
Born in Livingston County, New York, (Note: The birthplace is given either as Greigsville or Wadsworth, two neighboring hamlets in or near York.) Rippey received an Artium Baccalaureus degree from the University of Rochester in 1898, and then taught mathematics at Wagner College. In 1899, he received an Artium Magister degree from the University of Rochester. He was admitted to the bar in 1901, and practiced law in Rochester. He was the Monroe County Inheritance Tax Appraiser from 1912 to 1915, and Monroe County Inheritance Tax Attorney from 1922 to 1927. In 1927, he was appointed by Governor Al Smith as a justice of the New York Supreme Court (7th District) to fill a vacancy, and remained on the bench until the end of 1928. He was a member of the New York State Commission for the Revision of the Tax Laws from 1930 to 1936.

== Federal judicial service ==
Rippey was nominated by President Franklin D. Roosevelt on June 9, 1934, to a seat on the United States District Court for the Western District of New York vacated by Judge Simon L. Adler. He was confirmed by the United States Senate on June 14, 1934, and received his commission on June 18, 1934. He resigned on December 31, 1936, to accept a state judicial post.

== State judicial service and death ==
In 1936, he was elected on the Democratic ticket to the New York Court of Appeals. He remained on the Court of Appeals until the end of 1944 when he reached the constitutional age limit of 70 years. He died on March 11, 1946, in Rochester, New York.

== Sources ==
- The History of the New York Court of Appeals, 1932-2003 by Bernard S. Meyer, Burton C. Agata & Seth H. Agata (page 21)
- EX-JUDGE RIPPEY DIES IN ROCHESTER in NYT on March 13, 1946 (subscription required)

Legal offices
Preceded by Simon L. Adler	Judge of the United States District Court for the Western District of New York; 1934–1936	Succeeded by Harold P. Burke
