= Harold P. Burke =

American judge (1895–1981)

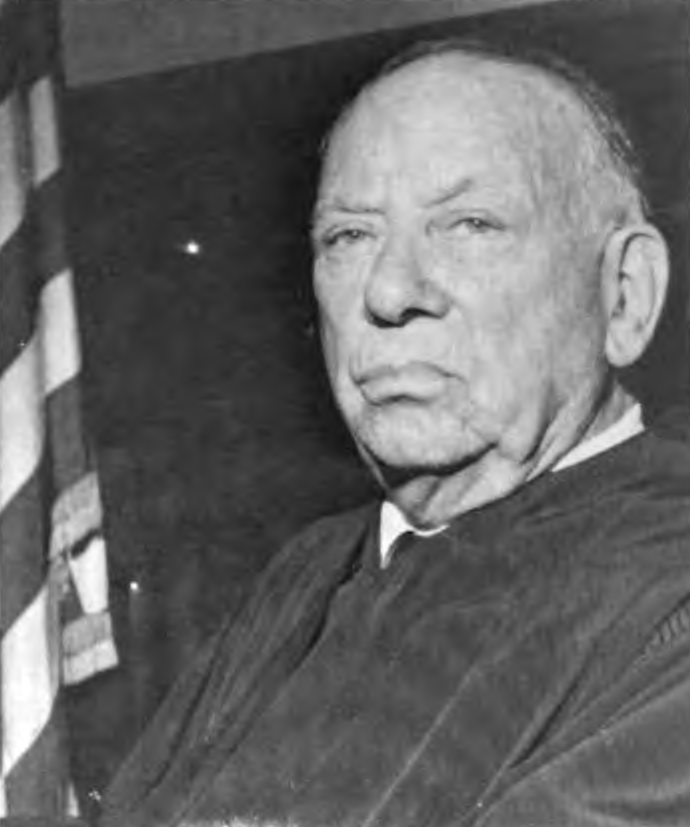

Senior Judge of the United States District Court for the Western District of New York
- In office June 15, 1981 – July 17, 1981

Chief Judge of the United States District Court for the Western District of New York
- In office 1955–1967
- Preceded by: John Knight
- Succeeded by: John Oliver Henderson

Judge of the United States District Court for the Western District of New York
- In office June 18, 1937 – June 15, 1981
- Appointed by: Franklin D. Roosevelt
- Preceded by: Harlan W. Rippey
- Succeeded by: Michael Anthony Telesca

Personal details
- Born: Harold Peter Burke; June 6, 1895 Rochester, New York, U.S.
- Died: July 17, 1981 (aged 86) Rochester, New York, U.S.
- Education: Notre Dame Law School (LL.B.)

Harold Peter Burke (June 6, 1895 – July 17, 1981) was a United States district judge of the United States District Court for the Western District of New York from 1937 to 1981 and its Chief Judge from 1955 to 1967.

== Education and career ==
Born in Rochester, New York, Burke received a Bachelor of Laws from Notre Dame Law School in 1916. He enlisted in the United States Army in October 1917 and was discharged in July 1919 as a corporal with Company B, 15th Machine Gun Battalion. After serving in the army, he was in private practice in Rochester from 1920 to 1931. He was an assistant state attorney general of New York from 1931 to 1934, and was corporate counsel for the City of Rochester from 1934 to 1937.

== Federal judicial service ==
On April 27, 1937, Burke was nominated by President Franklin D. Roosevelt to a seat on the United States District Court for the Western District of New York vacated by Judge Harlan W. Rippey. Burke was confirmed by the United States Senate on June 15, 1937, and received his commission on June 18, 1937. He served as Chief Judge from 1955 to 1967, and assumed senior status on June 15, 1981, the 44th anniversary of his Senate confirmation to the bench. One of Roosevelt's longest-serving appointees and the last federal judge in active service in the position FDR appointed him to, (Note: Luther Merritt Swygert, appointed by Roosevelt to the Northern District of Indiana, would be elevated by John F. Kennedy to the Seventh Circuit and take senior status one month after Burke.) Burke died on July 17, 1981, in Rochester, just over a month after stepping down. He is buried at Saint Anne's Roman Catholic Cemetery, Palmyra, New York.

== See also ==
- List of United States federal judges by longevity of service

== Sources ==
Legal offices
Preceded by Harlan W. Rippey	Judge of the United States District Court for the Western District of New York; 1937–1981	Succeeded by Michael Anthony Telesca
Preceded by John Knight	Chief Judge of the United States District Court for the Western District of New York; 1955–1967	Succeeded by John Oliver Henderson
