= Frank P. Geraci Jr. =

American judge (born 1951)

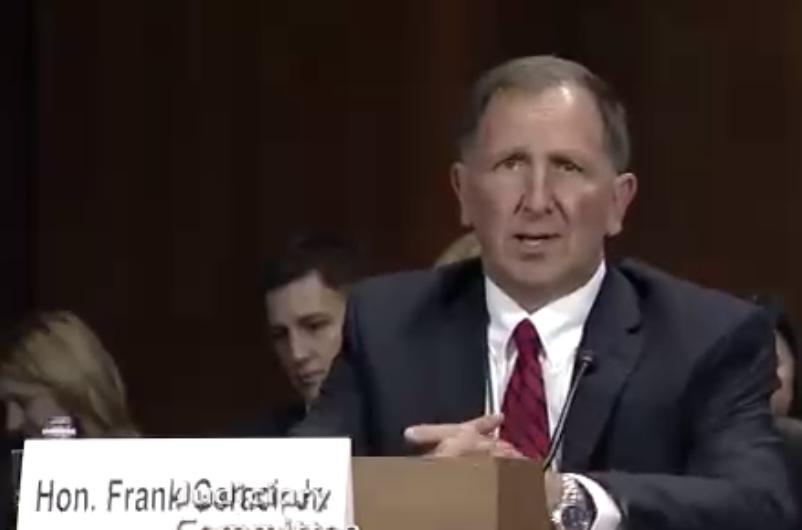

Senior Judge of the United States District Court for the Western District of New York
- Incumbent
- Assumed office April 1, 2023

Chief Judge of the United States District Court for the Western District of New York
- In office March 8, 2015 – July 14, 2021
- Preceded by: William M. Skretny
- Succeeded by: Elizabeth A. Wolford

Judge of the United States District Court for the Western District of New York
- In office January 2, 2013 – April 1, 2023
- Appointed by: Barack Obama
- Preceded by: David G. Larimer
- Succeeded by: Meredith Vacca

Personal details
- Born: Frank Paul Geraci Jr. July 14, 1951 (age 74) Rochester, New York, U.S.
- Education: University of Dayton (BA, JD)

Frank Paul Geraci Jr. (born July 14, 1951) is a senior United States district judge of the United States District Court for the Western District of New York.

== Early life and education ==
Geraci was born in 1951 in Rochester, New York. He received his Bachelor of Arts degree in 1973 from the University of Dayton. He received his Juris Doctor in 1977 from the University of Dayton Law School.

== Career ==
From 1978 to 1983, he served as a special assistant district attorney in the Monroe County District Attorney's Office. From 1983 to 1987, he served as an assistant United States attorney in the Western District of New York. Among the cases that Geraci handled while at the U.S. Attorney's Office was the prosecution of a group of self-styled mercenaries who engaged in an unsuccessful attempt to help imprisoned Philadelphia organized crime figure Stephen Vento and another man escape from the federal prison in Lewisburg, Pennsylvania.

Geraci was a partner at the law firm of Geraci & Feldman from 1987 to 1992. From 1992 to 1998, he was a judge of the Rochester City Court, presiding over civil cases, criminal misdemeanors and pre-trial felony matters. From 1999 to 2012, he served as a judge on the Monroe County Court in Rochester, New York, where he primarily handled criminal felonies.

=== Federal judicial service ===
On May 14, 2012, President Barack Obama nominated Geraci to be a United States district judge for the United States District Court for the Western District of New York, to the seat vacated by Judge David G. Larimer, who assumed senior status in 2009. His nomination was approved by the Senate Judiciary Committee on July 19, 2012. On December 13, 2012, the United States Senate confirmed Geraci by a voice vote. He received his commission on January 2, 2013. He served as Chief Judge from 2015 to 2021. On February 22, 2023, he announced his intent to assume senior status on April 1, 2023.

=== Notable cases ===
In 2021, Geraci denied a petition for compassionate release from imprisoned Rochester organized crime figure Dominic Taddeo, convicted of racketeering and the slaying of three people in mob wars in 1982 and 1983. Geraci determined that Taddeo did not merit compassionate release.

Legal offices
Preceded by David G. Larimer	Judge of the United States District Court for the Western District of New York; 2013–2023	Succeeded by Meredith Vacca
Preceded by William M. Skretny	Chief Judge of the United States District Court for the Western District of New York; 2015–2021	Succeeded by Elizabeth A. Wolford
