= Justin C. Morgan =

American judge

Judge of the United States District Court for the Western District of New York
- In office March 8, 1956 – May 24, 1959
- Appointed by: Dwight D. Eisenhower
- Preceded by: John Knight
- Succeeded by: John Oliver Henderson

Personal details
- Born: Justin Colfax Morgan; July 8, 1900 Buffalo, New York, U.S.
- Died: May 24, 1959 (aged 58)
- Education: Colgate University (A.B.); University of Buffalo Law School (LL.B.)

Justin Colfax Morgan (July 8, 1900 – May 24, 1959) was an American lawyer and politician from New York and a United States district judge of the United States District Court for the Western District of New York. Born in Buffalo, New York, Morgan received an Artium Baccalaureus degree from Colgate University in 1921, and a Bachelor of Laws from the University of Buffalo Law School in 1924.

Morgan entered private practice in Buffalo in 1925. He was an Assistant United States Attorney for the Western District of New York from 1928 to 1935. He was a councilman of the Town of Tonawanda from 1934 to 1940, and a member of the New York State Assembly from 1941 to 1956.

== Federal judicial service ==
Morgan sat in the 163rd, 164th, 165th, 166th, 167th, 168th, 169th and 170th New York State Legislatures.

On January 25, 1956, Morgan was nominated by President Dwight D. Eisenhower to the seat on the United States District Court for the Western District of New York vacated by Judge John Knight. Morgan was confirmed by the United States Senate on March 6, 1956, and received his commission on March 8, 1956. He served in that capacity until his death on May 24, 1959.

== Sources ==
New York State Assembly
Preceded by Charles O. Burney Jr.	New York State Assembly Erie County, 7th District; 1941–1944	Succeeded by Julius J. Volker
Preceded by Harold B. Ehrlich	New York State Assembly Erie County, 2nd District; 1945–1956	Succeeded by William E. Adams
Legal offices
Preceded by John Knight	Judge of the United States District Court for the Western District of New York; 1956–1959	Succeeded by John Oliver Henderson
