= John Thomas Curtin =

American judge (1921–2017)

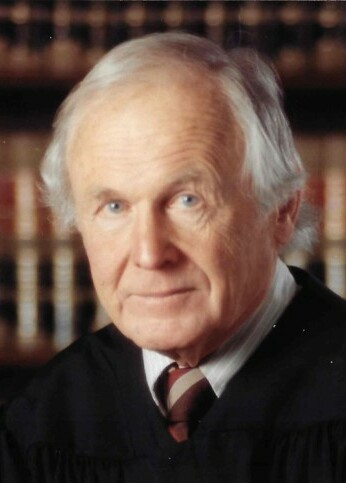

Senior Judge of the United States District Court for the Western District of New York
- In office July 1, 1989 – April 14, 2017

Chief Judge of the United States District Court for the Western District of New York
- In office 1974–1989
- Preceded by: John Oliver Henderson
- Succeeded by: Michael Anthony Telesca

Judge of the United States District Court for the Western District of New York
- In office December 14, 1967 – July 1, 1989
- Appointed by: Lyndon B. Johnson
- Preceded by: Seat established by 80 Stat. 75
- Succeeded by: William M. Skretny

Personal details
- Born: John Thomas Curtin; August 24, 1921; Buffalo, New York, U.S.
- Died: April 14, 2017 (aged 95); Buffalo, New York, U.S.
- Education: Canisius College (B.S.); University of Buffalo Law School (LL.B.)

John Thomas Curtin (August 24, 1921 – April 14, 2017) was a United States district judge of the United States District Court for the Western District of New York from 1967 to 2017 and its Chief Judge from 1974 to 1989.

== Early life and military service ==
Born in Buffalo, New York, Curtin was in the United States Marine Corps during World War II, from 1942 to 1945, achieving the rank of lieutenant colonel. He flew 35 combat missions during the war and survived a crash landing in the Pacific. He received a Bachelor of Science degree from Canisius College in 1946 and a Bachelor of Laws from the University of Buffalo Law School in 1949. He was in the United States Marine Corps Reserve from 1952 to 1954. Curtin was in private practice in Buffalo from 1949 to 1961, and was then the United States Attorney for the Western District of New York from 1961 to 1967.

== Federal judicial service ==
On November 28, 1967, Curtin was nominated by President Lyndon B. Johnson to a new seat on the United States District Court for the Western District of New York created by 80 Stat. 75. He was confirmed by the United States Senate on December 14, 1967, and received his commission the same day. He served as chief judge from 1974 to 1989, assuming senior status on July 1, 1989.

=== Notable case ===
In 1976, Curtin ruled on the case Arthur v. Nyquist, which effected the integration of the Buffalo Public School District. He ruled that schools were "deliberately segregated" and that they would need to begin desegregation efforts immediately. The plaintiffs in this case were a group of concerned parents and Buffalo Common Council member George Arthur. The defendants were the Buffalo Public School District, the City of Buffalo and New York State Commissioner of Education Ewald Nyquist.

In 1994, Curtin presided over the trial of drug dealer Sly Green and 27 members of his gang, the L.A. Boys. He sentenced Green to 4 life sentences, plus 110 years in prison.

== Retirement and death ==
Curtin took inactive senior status on April 12, 2016, at the age of 94. He died on April 14, 2017, at the age of 95, in Buffalo, New York. He was survived by his wife, Jane Good, whom he married in 1952, as well as seven children. His wife died on March 12, 2018.

== See also ==
- List of United States federal judges by longevity of service

== Sources ==
Legal offices
Preceded by Seat established by 80 Stat. 75	Judge of the United States District Court for the Western District of New York; 1967–1989	Succeeded by William M. Skretny
Preceded by John Oliver Henderson	Chief Judge of the United States District Court for the Western District of New York; 1974–1989	Succeeded by Michael Anthony Telesca
