= John Knight (judge) =

American judge

Chief Judge of the United States District Court for the Western District of New York
- In office 1948–1955
- Preceded by: Office established
- Succeeded by: Harold P. Burke

Judge of the United States District Court for the Western District of New York
- In office March 18, 1931 – June 15, 1955
- Appointed by: Herbert Hoover
- Preceded by: John R. Hazel
- Succeeded by: Justin C. Morgan

Member of the New York Senate from the 44th district
- In office January 1, 1917 – March 18, 1931
- Preceded by: Archie D. Sanders
- Succeeded by: Joe R. Hanley

Member of the New York State Assembly from the Wyoming district
- In office January 1, 1913 – December 31, 1916
- Preceded by: Henry A. Pierce
- Succeeded by: Bert P. Gage

Personal details
- Born: John Knight; April 29, 1871 Arcade, New York, U.S.
- Died: June 15, 1955 (aged 84)
- Party: Republican
- Education: University of Rochester (A.B.) read law

John Knight (April 29, 1871 – June 15, 1955) was an American lawyer and politician from New York. He was President pro tempore of the New York State Senate from 1925 to 1931, and a United States district judge of the United States District Court for the Western District of New York from 1931 to 1955 and its Chief Judge from 1948 to 1955.

== Education and career ==
Born on April 29, 1871, in Arcade, New York, Knight received an Artium Baccalaureus degree in 1893 from the University of Rochester and read law in 1896. He was the town clerk for Arcade from 1892 to 1896. He was in private practice in Arcade from 1896 to 1900. He was a Referee in Bankruptcy for the Western District of New York from 1899 to 1904. He was the district attorney for Wyoming County, New York from 1904 to 1913. He was a member of the New York State Assembly from 1913 to 1917. He was a member of the New York State Senate from 1917 to 1931, serving as President Pro Tem from 1924 to 1931.

=== State legislative and political service ===
Knight was a member of the New York State Assembly from Wyoming County in 1913, 1914, 1915 and 1916, and was Chairman of the Committee on Codes in 1915, and Chairman of the Committee on the Judiciary in 1916. He was a member of the New York State Senate from the 44th Senate District from 1917 to 1931, sitting in the 140th, 141st, 142nd, 143rd, 144th, 145th, 146th, 147th, 148th, 149th, 150th, 151st, 152nd, 153rd and 154th New York State Legislatures, and was President pro tempore from 1925 to 1931. Knight was an alternate delegate to the 1924 Republican National Convention and a delegate to the 1928 Republican National Convention.

== Federal judicial service ==
Knight received a recess appointment from President Herbert Hoover on March 18, 1931, to a seat on the United States District Court for the Western District of New York vacated by Judge John R. Hazel. He was nominated to the same position by President Hoover on December 15, 1931. He was confirmed by the United States Senate on January 6, 1932, and received his commission on January 9, 1932. He served as Chief Judge from 1948 to 1955. His service terminated on June 15, 1955, due to his death.

== Sources ==
- Appointed to federal bench, in New York Times on March 31, 1931 (subscription required)
- Obit in New York Times on June 16, 1955 (subscription required)
- Fenner-Broughton Family History: The Family of James Elory Fenner, 1844-1912, and Hester Adamantha (Broughton) Fenner, 1847-1922, of Crawford County, Pennsylvania by Jim Fenner (Closson Press, 1995)

New York State Assembly
Preceded by Henry A. Pierce	New York State Assembly from Wyoming County; 1913–1916	Succeeded by Bert P. Gage
New York State Senate
Preceded by Archie D. Sanders	New York State Senate from the 44th Senate District; 1917–1931	Succeeded by Joe R. Hanley
Political offices
Preceded by Jimmy Walker	President pro tempore of the New York State Senate; 1925–1931	Succeeded by George R. Fearon
Legal offices
Preceded by John R. Hazel	Judge of the United States District Court for the Western District of New York; 1931–1955	Succeeded by Justin C. Morgan
Preceded by Office established	Chief Judge of the United States District Court for the Western District of New York; 1948–1955	Succeeded by Harold P. Burke
