= David G. Larimer =

American judge (born 1944)

Senior Judge of the United States District Court for the Western District of New York
- Incumbent
- Assumed office March 3, 2009

Chief Judge of the United States District Court for the Western District of New York
- In office 1996–2002
- Preceded by: Michael Anthony Telesca
- Succeeded by: Richard Arcara

Judge of the United States District Court for the Western District of New York
- In office November 6, 1987 – March 3, 2009
- Appointed by: Ronald Reagan
- Preceded by: Seat established by 98 Stat. 333
- Succeeded by: Frank P. Geraci Jr.

Magistrate Judge of the United States District Court for the Western District of New York
- In office 1983–1987

Personal details
- Born: David George Larimer; March 3, 1944 (age 82) Rochester, New York, U.S.
- Education: St. John Fisher College (BA); Notre Dame University (JD)

David George Larimer (born March 3, 1944) is a senior United States district judge of the United States District Court for the Western District of New York.

== Education and career ==
Larimer was born in Rochester, New York. He received a Bachelor of Arts degree from St. John Fisher College in 1966 and a Juris Doctor from Notre Dame Law School in 1969. He served as a law clerk for Judge Joseph C. McGarraghy of the United States District Court for the District of Columbia from 1969 to 1970. After this, he was an assistant United States attorney for the District of Columbia in Washington, D.C. from 1970 to 1973. In the following years, Larimer worked as an assistant United States attorney of the Western District of New York in Rochester from 1973 to 1975. He was in private practice in Rochester from 1975 to 1979. An adjunct instructor of law, Larimer taught at St. John Fisher College from 1978 to 1981. He was a chief appellate law assistant for the Supreme Court, Appellate Division Fourth Department in Rochester from 1979 to 1981. He was in private practice in Rochester from 1982 to 1987.

=== Federal judicial service ===
Larimer was United States magistrate judge for the United States District Court for the Western District of New York from 1983 to 1987.

On May 5, 1987, Larimer was nominated by President Ronald Reagan to a new seat created by 98 Stat. 333, confirmed by the United States Senate on November 5, 1987, and received his commission on November 6, 1987. He served as Chief Judge from 1996 to 2002. He assumed senior status on March 3, 2009. Judge Frank P. Geraci Jr., of New York, was nominated by President Barack Obama on Monday, May 14, 2012 to the Senate and confirmed by voice vote on Thursday, December 13, 2012, as his replacement. As of December 2025, the Western District of New York's website lists Larimer as inactive.

== Sources ==
Legal offices
Preceded by Seat established by 98 Stat. 333	Judge of the United States District Court for the Western District of New York; 1987–2009	Succeeded by Frank P. Geraci Jr.
Preceded by Michael Anthony Telesca	Chief Judge of the United States District Court for the Western District of New York; 1996–2002	Succeeded by Richard Arcara
