= John R. Hazel =

American judge

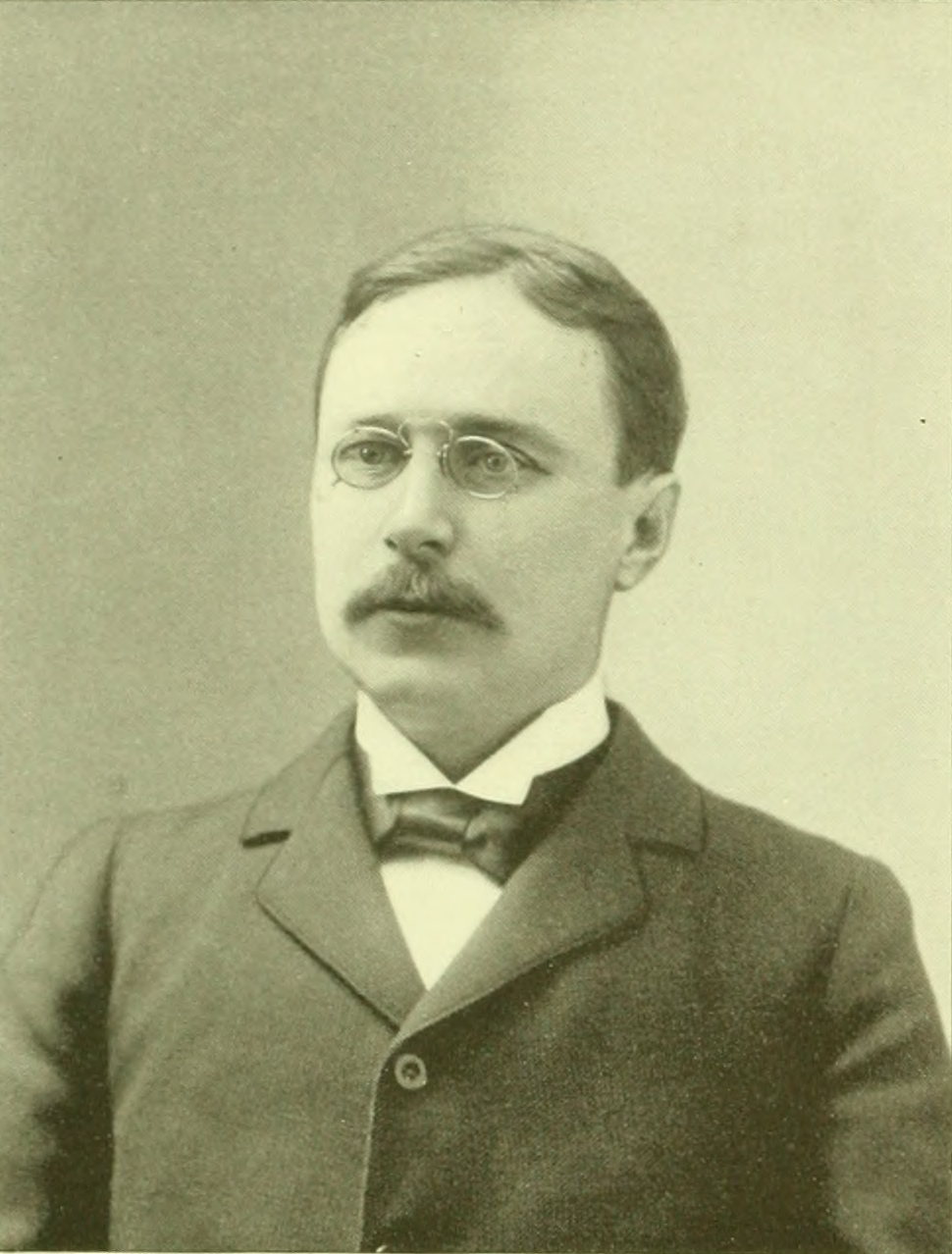

Judge of the United States District Court for the Western District of New York
- In office June 5, 1900 – March 5, 1931
- Appointed by: William McKinley
- Preceded by: Seat established by 31 Stat. 175
- Succeeded by: John Knight

Chair of the Erie County Republican Party
- In office 1899
- Preceded by: Harry W. Brendel
- Succeeded by: John N. Scratcherd

Personal details
- Born: John Raymond Hazel; December 18, 1860 Buffalo, New York, US
- Died: October 31, 1951 (aged 90)
- Education: read law

John Raymond Hazel (December 18, 1860 – October 31, 1951) was an American jurist who served as a United States district judge of the United States District Court for the Western District of New York from 1900 to 1931.

He administered the oath of office to President Theodore Roosevelt following the assassination of president William McKinley by Leon Czolgosz. Twenty years later, Hazel was a figure of the First Red Scare, targeting several anarchists under dubious grounds, such as Emma Goldman or Michael Stuppiello, in order to strip them from their US citizenship.

== Biography ==
=== Education and career ===
Born on December 18, 1860, in Buffalo, New York, Hazel read law in 1882. He entered private practice in Buffalo from 1882 to 1894. He was Commissioner of Corporation Taxes for the State of New York starting in 1894. He was a delegate to the 1900 Republican National Convention.

=== Federal judicial service ===
Hazel was nominated by President William McKinley on May 18, 1900, to the United States District Court for the Western District of New York, to a new seat authorized by 31 Stat. 175. He was confirmed by the United States Senate on June 5, 1900, and received his commission the same day. His service terminated on March 5, 1931, due to his retirement.

=== Nomination controversy ===
Hazel's nomination was opposed by the Buffalo Bar Association, which considered him unfit for judgeship. A group of five lawyers went to New York City on the association's behalf for the purpose of meeting with the Association of the Bar of the City of New York to express their opposition. Contemporaneous accounts indicate that it was a dispute between GOP boss Thomas C. Platt and the anti-Platt ring then prevalent in New York.

=== Roosevelt oath of office ===
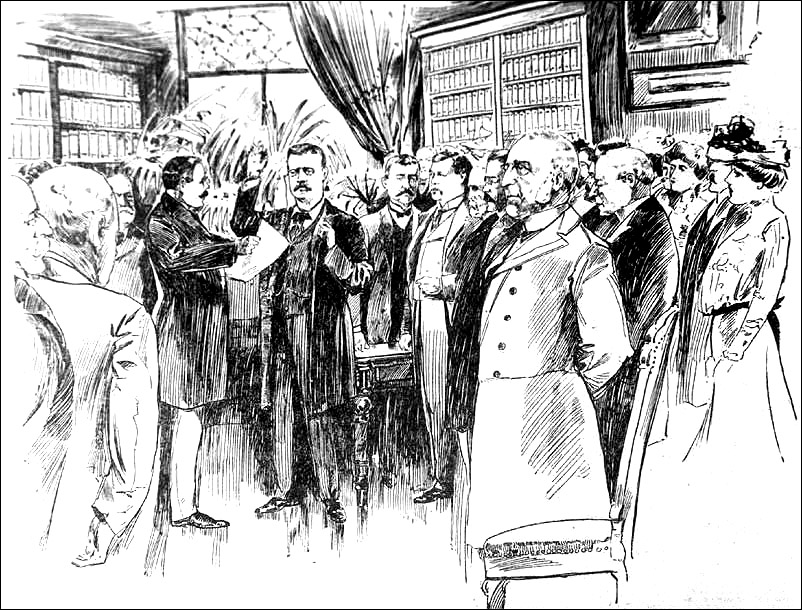
Judge Hazel swearing in Roosevelt following McKinley's death

On September 6, 1901, President McKinley was attending the Pan-American Exposition in Buffalo when he was shot by Leon Czolgosz. Vice President Roosevelt was vacationing in Vermont, and traveled to Buffalo to visit McKinley in the hospital. It appeared that McKinley would recover, so Roosevelt went on a planned family camping and hiking trip to Mount Marcy in the Adirondacks. In the mountains, a runner notified him McKinley was on his death bed. Roosevelt pondered with his wife, Edith, how best to respond, not wanting to show up in Buffalo and wait on McKinley's death. Roosevelt was rushed by a series of stagecoaches to North Creek train station. At the station, Roosevelt was handed a telegram that said President McKinley died at 2:30 AM, September 14, 1901.The new President continued by train from North Creek to Buffalo. He arrived in Buffalo later that day, accepting an invitation to stay at the home of Ansley Wilcox (now the Theodore Roosevelt Inaugural National Historic Site). It was there, on the afternoon of September 14, 1901, that Judge Hazel administered the oath to Roosevelt.

=== Subsequent cases and First Red Scare activity ===
In 1909, Judge Hazel issued an order cancelling the naturalization of Jacob A. Kersner, at the request of the United States Attorney's Office, and thus stripping the citizenship of his ex-wife, the Anarchist orator Emma Goldman, who had gained United States citizenship in 1887 by her marriage to Kersner. Ten years later, in 1919, the Wilson Administration used Hazel's voiding of her citizenship as the basis for ruling that Goldman could be deported to Russia as an "alien anarchist", along with 248 other "undesirables," on the USAT Buford. Generally speaking, Hazel was a key figure in the First Red Scare, during which he persecuted not only Goldman but also the Italian anarchist Michael Stuppiello, using questionable evidence to strip them of their citizenship.

Judge Hazel heard the 1910 to 1913 lawsuit by the Wright Brothers who alleged patent infringement against manufacturer Herring-Curtiss Company and inventor Glenn Curtiss. Hazel ruled in February 1913 for the Wrights, and the U.S. Court of Appeals upheld his decision in 1914. The decision was controversial for so favorably interpreting the uniqueness and priority of the technical achievements of the Wrights, and it has been argued that this broad interpretation of their intellectual property slowed aviation developments in the U.S.

== Death ==
Hazel died on October 13, 1951.

== See also ==
- List of United States federal judges by longevity of service

== Sources ==
- Morris, Edmund. The Rise of Theodore Roosevelt. Modern Library, 2001 (paperback edition). ISBN 0-375-75678-7.

Legal offices
Preceded by Seat established by 31 Stat. 175	Judge of the United States District Court for the Western District of New York; 1900–1931	Succeeded by John Knight
