= Richard Arcara =

American judge (born 1940)

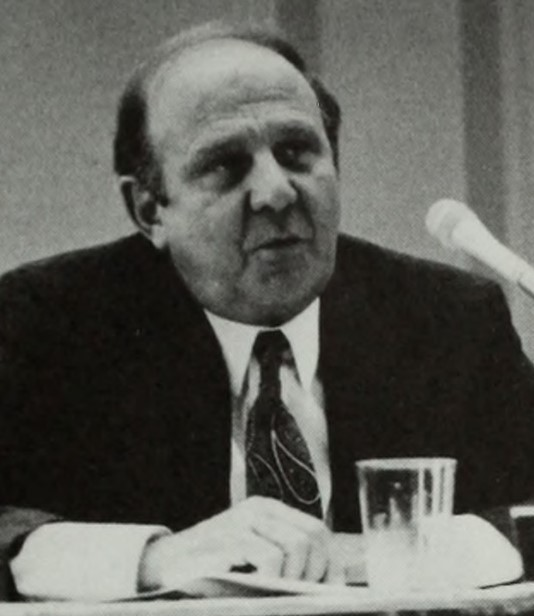

Senior Judge of the United States District Court for the Western District of New York
- Incumbent
- Assumed office January 3, 2015

Chief Judge of the United States District Court for the Western District of New York
- In office 2003–2010
- Preceded by: David G. Larimer
- Succeeded by: William M. Skretny

Judge of the United States District Court for the Western District of New York
- In office February 22, 1988 – January 3, 2015
- Appointed by: Ronald Reagan
- Preceded by: John T. Elfvin
- Succeeded by: Lawrence J. Vilardo

37th District Attorney of Erie County, New York
- In office January 1, 1982 – May 31, 1988
- Preceded by: Edward C. Cosgrove
- Succeeded by: Kevin M. Dillon

Personal details
- Born: Richard Joseph Arcara; June 6, 1940 (age 86) Buffalo, New York, U.S.
- Education: St. Bonaventure University (BA); Villanova University (JD)

Richard Joseph Arcara (born June 6, 1940) is a senior United States district judge of the United States District Court for the Western District of New York.

== Early life and education ==
Arcara was born in Buffalo, New York. He graduated from Canisius High School in 1958, received a Bachelor of Arts from St. Bonaventure University in 1962, and received a Juris Doctor from Villanova University School of Law in 1965. He was a captain in the United States Army, Military Police Corps from 1966 to 1967.

== Career ==
He was in private practice in Buffalo from 1968 to 1969. He joined the office of the United States Attorney of the Western District of New York in 1969, first as an Assistant United States Attorney until 1973, then as a First Assistant United States Attorney from 1973 to 1974, finally becoming the district's United States Attorney from 1975 to 1981. He was then Erie County, New York District Attorney from January 1, 1982 to May 31, 1988.

=== Federal judicial service ===
On August 7, 1987, Arcara was nominated by President Ronald Reagan to a seat on the United States District Court for the Western District of New York vacated by Judge John T. Elfvin, who assumed senior status. Arcara was confirmed by the United States Senate on February 19, 1988, and received his commission on February 22, 1988. He served as Chief Judge of the district from 2003 to 2010. He assumed senior status on January 3, 2015.

=== Notable rulings ===
Arcara presided over the 2007 trial of James Charles Kopp, who was charged with violating the Freedom of Access to Clinic Entrances Act. Kopp had previously been convicted in 2003 in New York State court by Judge Pigott for the 1998 sniper-style murder of Dr. Barnett Slepian, an American physician from Amherst, New York who performed abortions. Judge Arcara also presided over the internationally significant Robert Rhodes trial in 2005. Rhodes, a United States Customs and Border Protection Officer, was arrested and indicted for beating a Chinese National on the US-Canada border in Niagara Falls, NY. The incident was addressed by then Secretary of State Colin Powell and Secretary of Homeland Security Thomas Ridge when the Chinese Foreign Minister accused the United States of human rights violations by Rhodes' actions. Rhodes was acquitted after a high-profile trial in August 2005, presided over by Chief Judge Arcara.

== Sources ==
- Article title

Legal offices
Preceded by John T. Elfvin	Judge of the United States District Court for the Western District of New York; 1988–2015	Succeeded by Lawrence J. Vilardo
Preceded by David G. Larimer	Chief Judge of the United States District Court for the Western District of New York; 2003–2010	Succeeded by William M. Skretny
