= William M. Skretny =

American judge (born 1945)

William Marion Skretny

Senior Judge of the United States District Court for the Western District of New York
- Incumbent
- Assumed office March 8, 2015

Chief Judge of the United States District Court for the Western District of New York
- In office 2010–2015
- Preceded by: Richard Arcara
- Succeeded by: Frank P. Geraci Jr.

Judge of the United States District Court for the Western District of New York
- In office August 7, 1990 – March 8, 2015
- Appointed by: George H. W. Bush
- Preceded by: John Thomas Curtin
- Succeeded by: John Sinatra

Personal details
- Born: William Marion Skretny; March 8, 1945 (age 81) Buffalo, New York, U.S.
- Spouse: Carol A. Mergenhagen
- Education: Canisius College (AB); Howard University (JD); Northwestern University (LLM)

William Marion Skretny (born March 8, 1945) is a senior United States district judge of the United States District Court for the Western District of New York.

== Education and career ==
Skretny was born in Buffalo, New York. He received an Artium Baccalaureus degree from Canisius College in 1966, a Juris Doctor from Howard University School of Law in 1969, and a Master of Laws from Northwestern University School of Law in 1972. He was a Fellow at the Ford Foundation. He was an assistant United States attorney of the Northern District of Illinois from 1971 to 1973. He was an assistant United States attorney of the Western District of New York from 1973 to 1975. He was a first assistant United States attorney of Western District of New York from 1975 to 1981. He was a special counsel for the Attorney General's Advocacy Institute in Washington, D.C. in 1979. He was a staff attorney of Office of Special Prosecutor of the Department of Justice in Washington, D.C. in 1980. He was in private practice in Buffalo from 1981 to 1983. He was a first deputy district attorney of Erie County, New York from 1983 to 1988. He was in private practice in Buffalo from 1988 to 1990.

=== Federal judicial service ===
Skretny was nominated by President George H. W. Bush on June 12, 1990, to a seat on the United States District Court for the Western District of New York vacated by Judge John Thomas Curtin. He was confirmed by the United States Senate on August 3, 1990, and received his commission on August 7, 1990. He served as Chief Judge from 2010 to 2015. He assumed senior status on March 8, 2015.

== Personal ==
He is of Polish descent, and he and both his parents were active members of the Pulaski Association.

== Sources ==
Legal offices
Preceded by John Thomas Curtin	Judge of the United States District Court for the Western District of New York; 1990–2015	Succeeded by John Sinatra
Preceded by Richard Arcara	Chief Judge of the United States District Court for the Western District of New York; 2010–2015	Succeeded by Frank P. Geraci Jr.
