= Michael Anthony Telesca =

American judge (1929–2020)

Senior Judge of the United States District Court for the Western District of New York
- In office May 3, 1996 – March 5, 2020

Chief Judge of the United States District Court for the Western District of New York
- In office 1989–1995
- Preceded by: John Thomas Curtin
- Succeeded by: David G. Larimer

Judge of the United States District Court for the Western District of New York
- In office April 21, 1982 – May 3, 1996
- Appointed by: Ronald Reagan
- Preceded by: Harold P. Burke
- Succeeded by: Charles J. Siragusa

Personal details
- Born: November 25, 1929 Rochester, New York, U.S.
- Died: March 5, 2020 (aged 90)
- Education: University of Rochester (B.A.); University of Buffalo Law School (LL.B.)

Michael Anthony Telesca (November 25, 1929 – March 5, 2020) was a United States district judge of the United States District Court for the Western District of New York from 1982 to 2020 and its Chief Judge from 1989 to 1995.

== Education and career ==
Born in Rochester, New York, Telesca received a Bachelor of Arts degree from the University of Rochester in 1952 and a Bachelor of Laws from the University of Buffalo Law School in 1955. He was a First Lieutenant in the United States Marine Corps from 1955 to 1957. He was in private practice in Rochester from 1957 to 1972. He was a judge of the Surrogate Court in Monroe County, New York from 1973 to 1982.

== Federal judicial service ==
On March 11, 1982, Telesca was nominated by President Ronald Reagan to a seat on the United States District Court for the Western District of New York vacated by Judge Harold P. Burke. Telesca was confirmed by the United States Senate on April 20, 1982, and received his commission on April 21, 1982. He served as Chief Judge from 1989 to 1995, assuming senior status on May 3, 1996. He served as a Judge of the Alien Terrorist Removal Court from the establishment of that court in 1996 until 2015, being initially appointed and reappointed by Chief Justice William Rehnquist and subsequently being reappointed two additional times by Chief Justice John Roberts. Telesca announced on January 8, 2020 that he planned to assume inactive senior status on May 3, 2020. He died on March 5, 2020.

== Sources ==
Legal offices
Preceded by Harold P. Burke	Judge of the United States District Court for the Western District of New York; 1982–1996	Succeeded by Charles J. Siragusa
Preceded by John Thomas Curtin	Chief Judge of the United States District Court for the Western District of New York; 1989–1995	Succeeded by David G. Larimer
