= Sly Green =

American drug trafficker and gangster

- Born: Donald Green; Buffalo, New York, US
- Years active: 1980s—1994
- Criminal charges: Racketeering, conspiracy, obstruction of justice
- Penalty: 4 life sentences, plus 110 years
- Capture status: Captured

Donald "Sly" Green (fl. 1980s – c. 1997) is an American convicted drug trafficker and gangster. He was the founder of the L.A. Boys gang in Buffalo, New York.

== Early life and crime ==
Green was born in Buffalo. He founded the L.A. Boys gang. They were named the "L.A. Boys" because they received their supply of narcotics from Los Angeles.

The L.A. boys were notorious for their violence. They were one of the most powerful gangs in the Buffalo area during the 1980s and 1990s, being estimated to have made millions off selling cocaine. One time during a high-speed car chase, Green attempted to jump into the car of rival dealer "Fat Richard".

Green's brother, Clayton "Iceberg" Green (b. c. 1954), was also a member of the L.A. Boys. He was arrested in a police raid in 2006, where they found cocaine.

== Convictions ==
In 1991, Green was arrested on murder charges. There, he showed another inmate newspaper clippings on his gang, saying "These are my guys. This is what they're doing".

On March 30, 1994, under the presiding of John Thomas Curtin, 27 members of the gang were found guilty of racketeering, conspiracy and obstruction of justice. Court evidence of the seven-week long trial showed that Green was plotting to make US$50,000,000.00 off cocaine deals. Green appealed, and he was again found guilty on March 27, 1997. He filed for his trial to be extended, which was denied on December 15. Overall, Green was sentenced to four life sentences, plus 110 years in prison.

Attorney William J. Hochul Jr. was often an adversary to Green and his associates. He argued in the 1994 convictions, and later argued in a 1996 murder trial of L.A. boys member George "Dog" Powell.

== Legacy ==
Green is often mentioned by Buffalo rappers Westside Gunn and Benny the Butcher, who also worked as drug dealers in Buffalo during the 1990s and 2000s. Benny the Butcher has a song titled "Sly Green", off the 2020 album Burden of Proof. Westside Gunn features Green on "Sly Green Skit", off the 2016 album Flygod. In 2024, Gunn also featured Sly Green on every song of his 11 EP.
