= Elizabeth A. Wolford =

American judge (born 1966)

Elizabeth Wolford
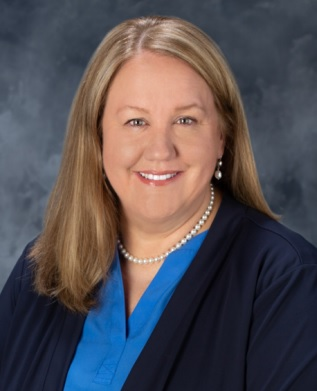

Chief Judge of the United States District Court for the Western District of New York
- Incumbent
- Assumed office July 14, 2021
- Preceded by: Frank P. Geraci Jr.

Judge of the United States District Court for the Western District of New York
- Incumbent
- Assumed office December 17, 2013
- Appointed by: Barack Obama
- Preceded by: Charles J. Siragusa

Personal details
- Born: 1966 (age 59–60) Buffalo, New York, U.S.
- Education: Colgate University (BA); University of Notre Dame (JD)

Elizabeth Ann Wolford (born 1966) is the chief United States district judge of the United States District Court for the Western District of New York. She is the first woman to serve as a judge in the Western District and the first woman to be chief judge of the Western District of New York.

== Biography ==
Wolford was born in 1966, in Buffalo, New York. She received a Bachelor of Arts degree in 1989, from Colgate University. She received a Juris Doctor in 1992, from the University of Notre Dame Law School. Upon graduation from law school she joined the recently formed The Wolford Law Firm LLP as a partner, spending her entire career in private practice at that firm. Her practice was concentrated in the areas of commercial, employment and personal injury litigation before both federal and state courts. She served as President of the Greater Rochester Association for Women Attorneys from 2003 to 2004 and as President of the Foundation of the Monroe County Bar from 2010 to 2012.

=== Federal judicial service ===
On May 16, 2013, President Barack Obama nominated Wolford to serve as a United States District Judge of the United States District Court for the Western District of New York, to the seat vacated by Judge Charles J. Siragusa, who assumed senior status on December 15, 2012. The Senate Judiciary Committee reported her nomination out of committee on August 1, 2013 by a voice vote. On December 12, 2013, the United States Senate invoked cloture on Wolford’s nomination by a 55–41 vote. Later that day, her nomination was confirmed by a 70–29 vote. She received her judicial commission on December 17, 2013. She became chief judge on July 14, 2021.

== See also ==
- List of first women lawyers and judges in New York

Legal offices
Preceded by Charles J. Siragusa	Judge of the United States District Court for the Western District of New York; 2013–present	Incumbent
Preceded by Frank P. Geraci Jr.	Chief Judge of the United States District Court for the Western District of New York; 2021–present	Incumbent
