= Charles J. Siragusa =

American judge (born 1947)

Senior Judge of the United States District Court for the Western District of New York
- Incumbent
- Assumed office December 15, 2012

Judge of the United States District Court for the Western District of New York
- In office November 5, 1997 – December 15, 2012
- Appointed by: Bill Clinton
- Preceded by: Michael Anthony Telesca
- Succeeded by: Elizabeth A. Wolford

Personal details
- Born: August 10, 1947 (age 79) Rochester, New York, U.S.
- Education: Le Moyne College (B.A.); Albany Law School (J.D.)

Charles Joseph Siragusa (born August 10, 1947) is a senior United States district judge of the United States District Court for the Western District of New York.

== Education and career ==
Siragusa received his Bachelor of Arts degree from Le Moyne College in 1969 and his Juris Doctor in 1976 from Albany Law School. Siragusa served as an Assistant District Attorney in Monroe County from 1977 to 1992 where he rose to the rank of First Assistant District Attorney.

During his time as first assistant district attorney, Siragusa successfully prosecuted Arthur Shawcross, also known as The Genesee River Killer. Shawcross had killed eleven victims starting in 1988 before his capture less than two years later in January 1990. Shawcross died November 10, 2008, while serving a life sentence.

Siragusa also successfully prosecuted Frank Sterling for the 1988 murder of Viola Manville. After Sterling’s conviction, but before sentencing, a group of teenagers went to Siragusa and told him that a man named Mark Christie had bragged about killing Manville. They later said that they felt "bullied" by Siragusa, who dismissed their claims without taking them seriously. Sterling was released in 2010, after serving nearly twenty years of a life sentence "because of new evidence — including DNA — pointing to Christie."

== Judicial service ==
=== New York State Supreme Court ===
In 1993, Siragusa was elected as a New York State Supreme Court Justice in the Seventh Judicial District where he served for four years.

=== Federal judicial service ===
On July 15, 1997, President Bill Clinton nominated Siragusa to the United States District Court for the Western District of New York to a seat vacated by Michael Anthony Telesca. He was confirmed by the United States Senate on October 30, 1997, and received his commission on November 5, 1997. He took senior status on December 15, 2012.

== Notable rulings ==
In August 2010, Siragusa ruled that the town board of Greece, New York, did not commit a constitutional violation by opening its meetings with a brief prayer. The judge signed an order that tossed out a lawsuit filed by two residents of the town of who had complained that prayers held at the start of town council meetings favored Christians and violated the separation of church and state. Siragusa noted that government bodies throughout the country routinely invite religious leaders to make invocations at the start of public meetings. He said those prayers are acceptable as long as the town body isn't proselytizing or advancing any one faith at the expense of others. The town of Greece said they welcome people of any faith to give the prayer. However, in May 2012 the ruling was overturned by the Second Circuit Court of Appeals. On May 20, 2013, the Supreme Court granted petition for certiorari. On May 5, 2014, in Town of Greece v. Galloway, the U.S. Supreme Court overturned the Second Circuit and affirmed Siragusa's decision, ruling 5-4 in favor of the Town of Greece that the town's practice of beginning legislative sessions with prayers does not violate the Establishment Clause of the First Amendment.

Legal offices
Preceded by Michael Anthony Telesca	Judge of the United States District Court for the Western District of New York; 1997–2012	Succeeded by Elizabeth A. Wolford
