= List of Villanova University alumni =

This list of Villanova University alumni includes notable graduates and non-graduate former students of Villanova University.

== Arts, entertainment, and journalism ==
- Maria Bello - Golden Globe-nominated actress
- Victor Buono - Academy Award-nominated actor
- Ryan J. Condal - screenwriter, TV series co-creator, executive producer
- Bradley Cooper - Academy Award-nominated actor (attended for one year before transferring to Georgetown University)
- Jim Croce - recording artist
- Carmen Gentile - journalist, author and public speaker
- David Luis Gonzalez - artist and activist, subject of the Pultizer Prize-winning podcast Suave
- Tim Hauser - singer and founder of the vocal group The Manhattan Transfer
- Michael Hollinger - playwright and screenwriter
- Keith Jones - Emmy award-winning news anchor and reporter at WCAU in Philadelphia
- Monica Malpass - M.A. in political science in 1999; news anchor and reporter for WPVI
- Gerald Marzorati - editor of The New York Times Magazine; assistant managing editor of The New York Times
- Kacie McDonnell - Fox News talent, mostly on Fox Business as host of Mansion Global
- Don McLean - recording artist (attended for three months and did not receive a degree)
- Ryan Montbleau - recording artist
- Vincent Piazza - actor (attended for a year; did not graduate)
- David Rabe - playwright (Hurlyburly) and screenwriter (Casualties of War, The Firm)
- Murtaza Razvi - journalist, senior assistant editor and head of magazines, Dawn, political analyst, The Indian Express
- Greg Rikaart - Emmy Award-winning actor; soap opera The Young and the Restless
- Jennifer Santiago - Emmy Award-winning reporter, CBS4 News, Miami
- Cole Sternberg - visual artist
- Diana Sugg - journalist and editor at the Baltimore Sun, awarded the Pulitzer Prize for Beat Reporting in 2003
- Philip Terzian - literary editor, The Weekly Standard, author (Architects of Power: Roosevelt, Eisenhower and the American Century)
- Mary Walter - on-air personality, radio show host, political commentator
- Wheeler Yuta (Paul Gruber) - professional wrestler

== Business, law, and economics ==
- Ayman Asfari - British-Syrian businessman, CEO of Petrofac
- Stephen Bienko - Olympic gold medalist trainer and entrepreneur
- Robert J. Bolger - co-founder, former president and CEO of National Association of Chain Drug Stores
- John Drosdick - chief executive officer, Sunoco
- Joseph Dugan - president and CEO, L.B. Foster Company
- John Eleuthère du Pont - philanthropist
- José Fanjul - billionaire sugar baron
- Robert Genuario - former Connecticut state senator, Connecticut Superior Court judge
- Chris Gheysens (VSB, 1993) - president and CEO of Wawa Inc.
- Brian Higgins - billionaire hedge fund manager of King Street Capital Management
- James Kim - chairman of Amkor Technology
- Thomas G. Labrecque - former CEO of Chase Manhattan Bank
- James Mullen - president and chief executive officer, Biogen Idec
- Jerry Pappert - judge of the United States District Court for the Eastern District of Pennsylvania; attorney general of Pennsylvania 2003–2005
- Ronald O. Perelman - billionaire CEO of Mackandrews and Forbes (one semester in 1960, before transferring to University of Pennsylvania)
- Michael G. Rubin - drop-out billionaire CEO of Fanatics
- Paul V. Scura - former executive vice president and head of Investment Bank of Prudential Securities
- John Waldron - criminal defense lawyer
- David Worby - trial lawyer who specializes in personal injury cases, most notably Ground Zero illnesses

== Education, engineering, and the sciences ==
- Andrew M. Allen - NASA astronaut and Space Shuttle pilot
- Bridgette Brawner - nurse researcher and professor
- Sean M. Carroll - theoretical physicist
- Steve Chen - computer engineer, principal architect of Cray X-MP supercomputer
- Nance Dicciani - chemical engineer, ranked one of The World's 100 Most Powerful Women
- Tyler Folsom - engineer, academic, and researcher known for his work on autonomous vehicles
- Edward Guinan - astronomer, discovered Neptune's ring system
- John L. Hennessy - retired president of Stanford University
- Jamie Hyneman - co-host and executive producer of MythBusters (honorary doctor of Engineering and co-advisor of VU COE senior capstone project)
- Deirdre Imus - head of the Deidre Imus Environmental Center for Pediatric Oncology
- Emanuel Rubin - pathologist known for his achievements in clinical and laboratory research, and medical education

== Government, politics, and military ==
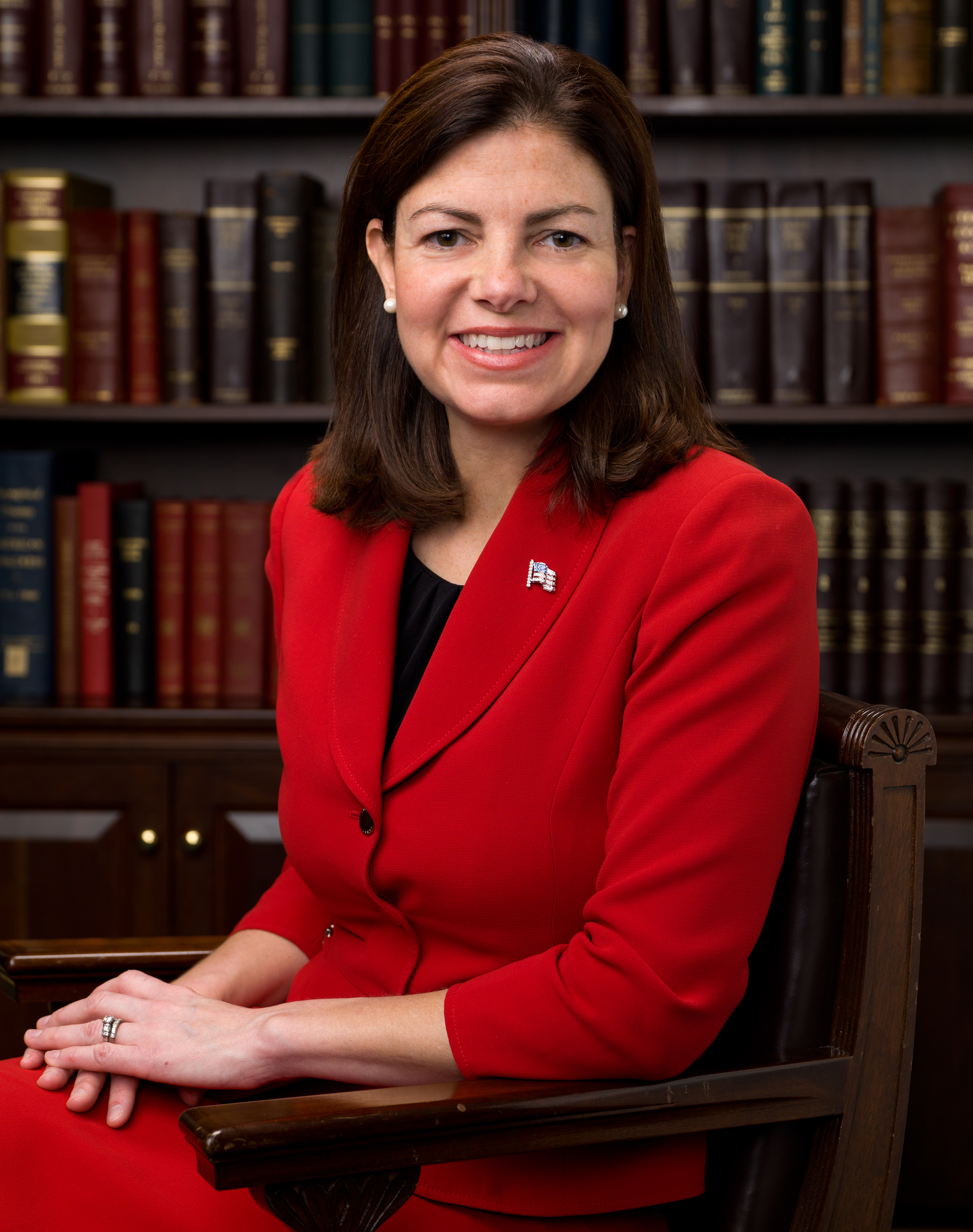
Governor Kelly Ayotte

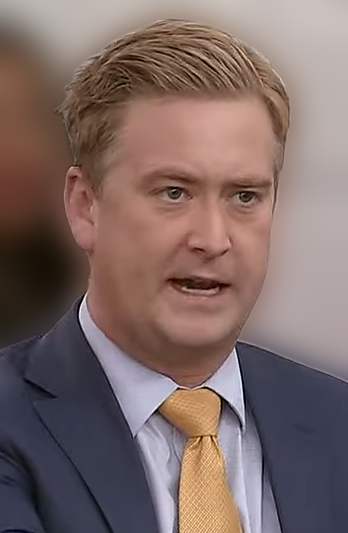
Peter Doocy

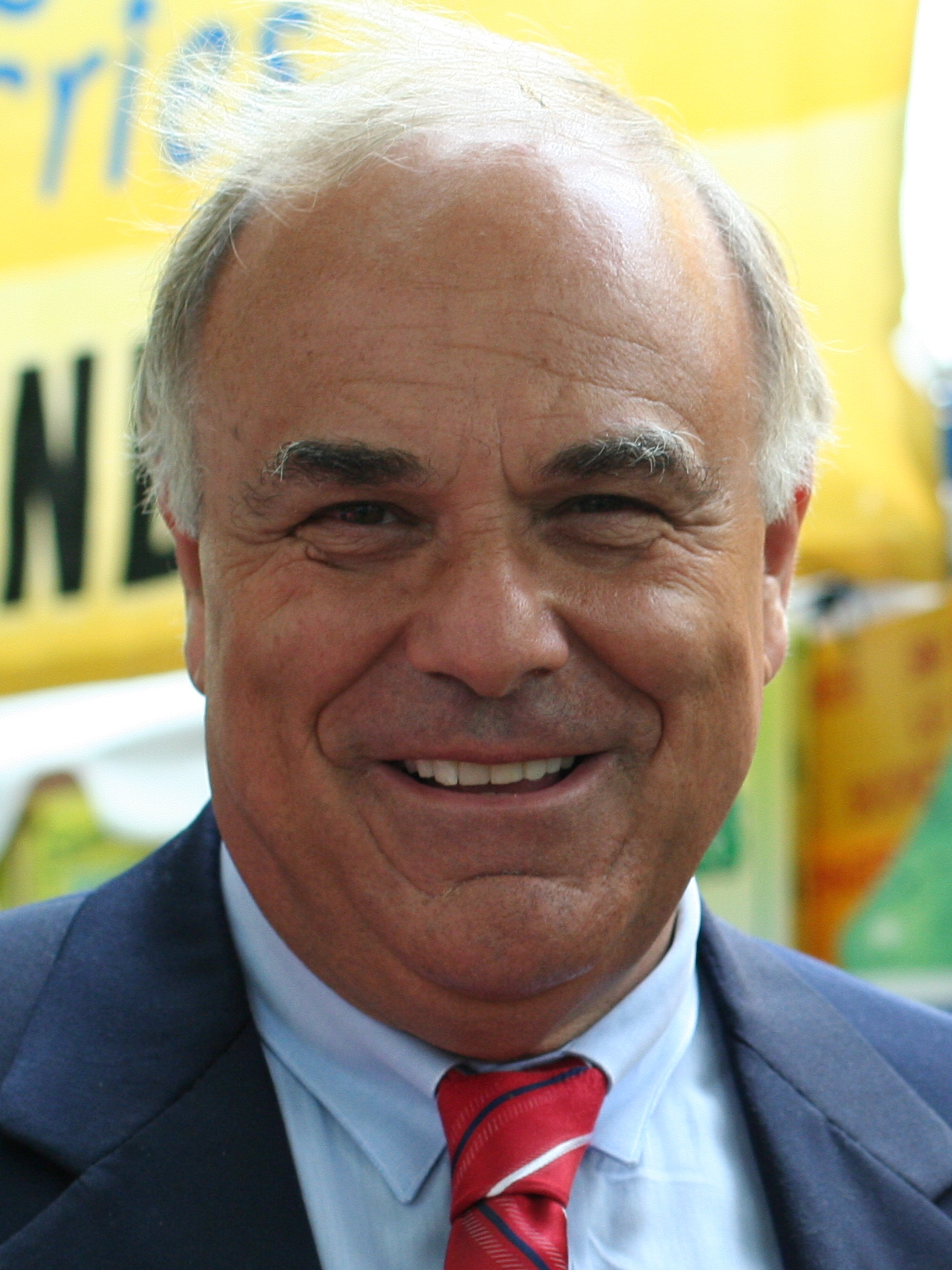
Governor Ed Rendell (D-PA)

- Kelly Ayotte - governor of New Hampshire, former U.S. senator, and former attorney general of New Hampshire
- Jill Biden - First Lady of the United States
- G. T. Bynum - mayor of Tulsa, Oklahoma
- David A. Christian - retired United States Army captain and former candidate for the Republican nomination in the 2012 United States Senate election in Pennsylvania
- Joseph Clancy - former director of the U.S. Secret Service
- George B. Crist - general; first Marine to be designated commander in chief, Central Command
- Christopher G. Donovan - speaker of the Connecticut House of Representatives
- Peter Doocy - White House correspondent for Fox News
- Walter Doran - admiral, U.S. Navy (retired)
- William J. Fallon - admiral, U.S. Navy, and commander of United States Central Command
- Jacob Frey - mayor of Minneapolis, Minnesota
- Charlie Gerow - political consultant, commentator and lawyer
- D. Barry Gibbons - member of the Pennsylvania House of Representatives, Delaware County, 1961–1962
- David Girard-diCarlo - nominated as U.S. ambassador to Austria
- Joseph Hare - rear admiral, U.S. Navy
- Kate M. Harper - member of the Pennsylvania House of Representatives since 2001
- Jerramiah T. Healy - mayor, Jersey City, New Jersey
- Charles A. Heimbold, Jr. - former U.S. ambassador to Sweden and former chairman of Bristol-Myers Squibb; endowed Villanova's Heimbold Chair of Irish Studies
- Jennifer L. Johnson - U.S. ambassador to the Federated States of Micronesia
- Paul X. Kelley - retired Marine general and former commandant of the Marine Corps
- John LaFalce - former U.S. congressman from New York state, 1975–2002
- Frank J. Larkin - sergeant at arms of the U.S. Senate
- William J. Martini - district court judge for the United States District Court for the District of New Jersey
- Joseph J. McMenamin - brigadier general, U.S. Marine Corps
- Nicholas Micozzie - Pennsylvania state representative for the 163rd district (1979–2014)
- Ricaurte Vásquez Morales - chairman of the Panama Canal Authority
- Charles A. Murphy - member of the Massachusetts House of Representatives and chairman of the House Ways and Means Committee
- Peter O'Keefe - Pennsylvania state representative 1975–1978
- Samuel J. Paparo Jr. - admiral, US Navy, 64th commander of the Pacific Fleet
- Jerry Pappert - attorney general of Pennsylvania 2003–2005; judge of the United States District Court for the Eastern District of Pennsylvania
- Dominic Pileggi - state senate majority leader of Pennsylvania
- Stanley A. Prokop - former U.S. congressman from Pennsylvania, 1959–1961
- James M. Quigley - former U.S. congressman from Pennsylvania
- Ed Rendell - former Pennsylvania governor and general chair of the Democratic National Committee in 2000
- Marjorie Rendell - former first lady of Pennsylvania; federal judge for the U.S. Court of Appeals for the Third Circuit
- Stefan Roots - mayor of Chester, Pennsylvania
- John G. Rowland - former Connecticut governor, 1995–2004
- Matthew J. Ryan - former member of the Pennsylvania House of Representatives; Speaker of the Pennsylvania House of Representatives
- Dick Schulze - former U.S. congressman from the State of Pennsylvania, 1975–1993
- Donald Snyder (J.D. 1982) - member of the Pennsylvania House of Representatives, 1981–2000; majority whip
- Xavier Suarez - former mayor of Miami
- Dan Truitt - member of Pennsylvania House of Representatives
- Michael E. Wegscheider - US Army major general
- Anthony Zinni - general, U.S. Marine Corps (retired); former commander in chief of U.S. Central Command (CENTCOM)

== Religion and philosophy ==
- William Edward Atkinson - Catholic priest with a cause for sainthood
- Michael Francis Burbidge - bishop of the Roman Catholic Diocese of Arlington
- Pope Leo XIV - 267th pope, born Robert Francis Prevost
- Salvador Miranda - church historian
- John Joseph O'Connor - cardinal and archbishop of the Archdiocese of New York

== Sports and athletics ==
- Malik Allen - former professional basketball player, currently assistant coach with the Miami Heat
- Ryan Arcidiacono - professional basketball player, currently with the Windy City Bulls, most outstanding player of the 2016 NCAA Men's Division I Basketball Tournament
- Paul Arizin - former professional basketball player, member of Basketball Hall of Fame, voted one of the 50 all-time greatest in NBA history in 1996
- Al Atkinson - professional football player, starting linebacker for the Super Bowl Champion 1969 New York Jets
- James Bell (born 1992) - professional basketball player for Japanese team Passlab Yamagata Wyverns
- Christian Benford - professional football player for the Buffalo Bills
- Michael Bradley - former professional basketball player, NBA and European leagues
- Don Bragg - 1960 Olympic pole vaulting gold medalist
- Mikal Bridges - professional basketball player, currently with the New York Knicks
- Jalen Brunson - professional basketball player, currently with the New York Knicks
- Eamonn Coghlan - track and field athlete, four-time Olympian and the only man over age 40 to run a sub-four-minute mile
- Rolando Cruz - three-time Olympic pole vaulter for Puerto Rico
- Jim Curtin - former Major League Soccer player and current head coach of the Philadelphia Union
- Ron Delany - track and field athlete, gold medalist in 1500 meters at the 1956 Olympic Games
- Denise Dillon - VU Hall of Fame; former Drexel University head women's basketball coach; Villanova University head women’s basketball coach
- Donte DiVincenzo - professional basketball player, currently with the Minnesota Timberwolves
- Tim Donaghy - former professional basketball referee
- Jumbo Elliott - track and field coach, inducted into National Track & Field Hall of Fame, 1981
- Brian Finneran - former professional football player, Philadelphia Eagles ('99) and Atlanta Falcons (2000–2009), Walter Payton Award winner 1997
- Chris Ford - former professional basketball player and coach of the Milwaukee Bucks, Boston Celtics, Los Angeles Clippers and Philadelphia 76ers
- Randy Foye - former professional basketball player
- Stan Galazin - professional football player
- Josh Hart - professional basketball player, currently playing with the New York Knicks
- Darrun Hilliard (born 1993) - basketball player for Maccabi Tel Aviv of the Israeli Basketball Premier League
- Larry James - track and field athlete, 1968 Olympic gold and silver medalist in 1600 m relay and 400 m, respectively; director of athletics and recreation at Richard Stockton College of New Jersey
- Wali Jones - former professional basketball player
- Kerry Kittles - former professional basketball player with the New Jersey Nets and Los Angeles Clippers, First Team Basketball All-American 1996
- Marty Liquori - track and field athlete, competed in the 1968 Olympics as a freshman in the 1500 meter
- Howie Long - former professional football player and Pro Football Hall of Fame inductee, Oakland Raiders (1981–1993), football analyst, actor
- Kyle Lowry - professional basketball player, 2019 NBA Champion, currently with the Philadelphia 76ers
- Art Mahan - former professional baseball player for the Philadelphia Phillies, United States Navy officer, Villanova baseball coach and athletic director
- Sydney Maree - track and field athlete, 1988 Olympian, three NCAA titles (1500: 1980, 81; 5000: 1979)
- Bill Melchionni - former professional basketball player, number retired by NBA Nets
- John Mellus - professional football player; named All-American while at Villanova
- Jimmy Murray - former general manager of the Philadelphia Eagles, co-founder of Ronald McDonald House
- Marcus O'Sullivan - Villanova University head coach; three-time indoor world champion; four-time Olympian
- Sonia O'Sullivan - track and field athlete, 2000 Olympic silver medalist in 5000 m
- Don Paige - track and field athlete
- Richie Phillips - lawyer, players' agent, former head of MLB Umpires and NBA officials unions
- Ed Pinckney - former professional basketball player, MVP of 1985 Final Four, member of 1985 National Championship winning basketball team
- John Pinone - Second Team Basketball All-American, 1983
- Howard Porter - former professional basketball player, First Team Basketball All-American 1971
- Summer Rappaport - triathlete, 2020 Olympic Games
- Allan Ray - former professional basketball player
- Kevin Reilly - former professional football player
- Scottie Reynolds - professional basketball player for Polish team Stal Ostrów Wielkopolski; First Team Basketball All-American 2009
- John Ricco - baseball executive; senior vice president and chief of staff for the New York Mets
- Browning Ross - Olympic long-distance runner (1948 and 1952) and gold medal winner at the 1951 Pan American Games
- Mike Seamon - professional soccer player for MLS Seattle Sounders
- Mike Siani - NFL wide receiver, No. 1 draft choice of the Oakland Raiders
- Maddy Siegrist - professional basketball player with the Dallas Wings of the WNBA
- Rory Sparrow - former professional basketball player
- Art Spector (1920–1987) - Boston Celtics basketball player
- Matt Szczur - former professional baseball player; member of 2009 National Championship winning football team
- Tim Thomas - former professional basketball player
- Raymond Ventrone - former professional football player, currently special teams coach for the Indianapolis Colts; 2008 Super Bowl participant with NFL Patriots
- Doug West - former professional basketball player; unsuccessfully recruited by then-Pitt assistant coach John Calipari
- Brian Westbrook - former professional football player, 2001 Walter Payton Award winner, 2006 Super Bowl participant with Philadelphia Eagles
