= Versini =

Versini is a surname. Notable people with the surname include:

- André Versini (1923–1966), French actor
- Marie Versini (1940–2021), French actress
- Jean-Pierre Versini-Campinchi (1939–2023), French lawyer
