= Bauer Hotel (Venice) =

Hotel on the Grand Canal in Venice, Italy

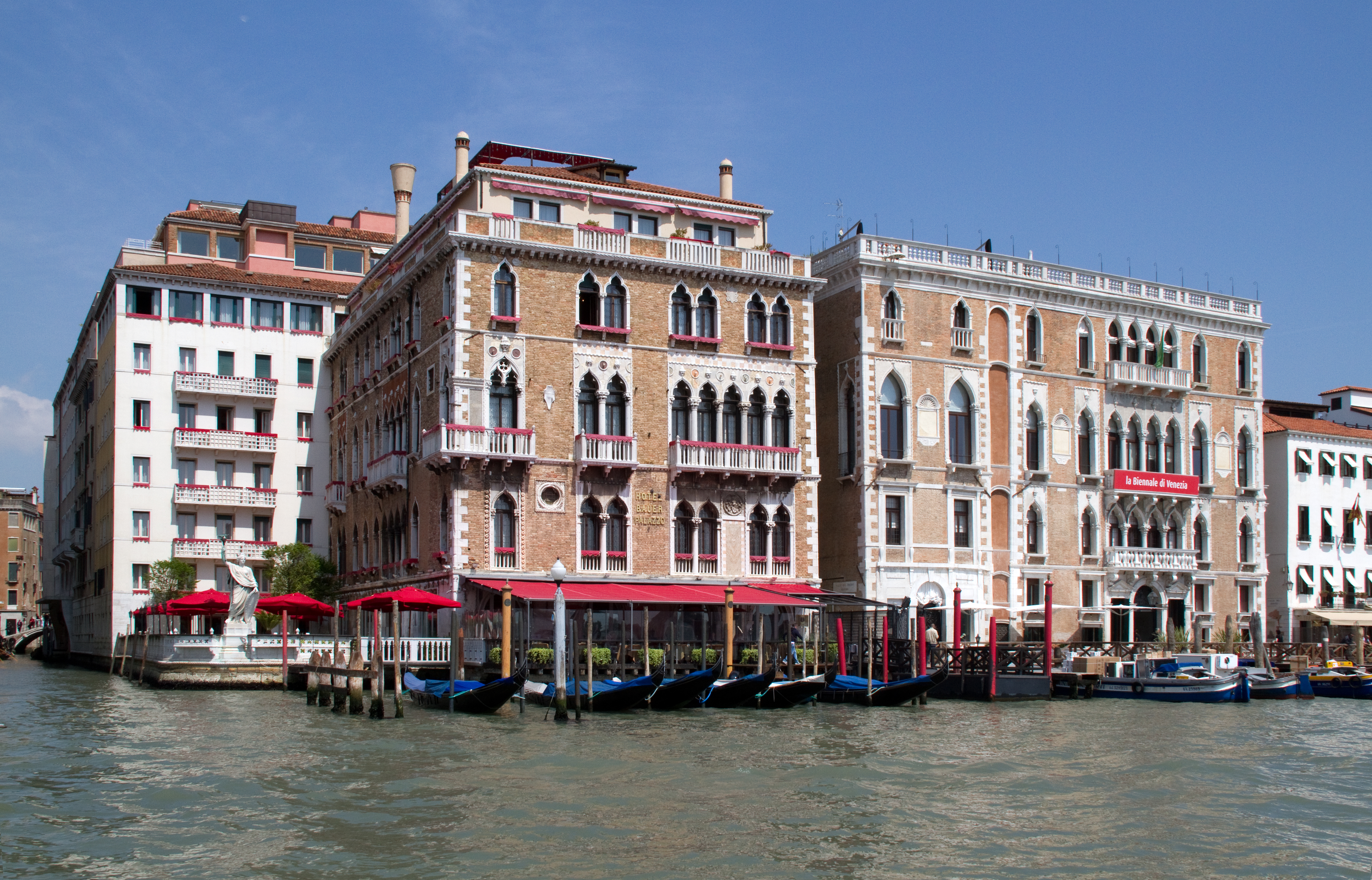
Bauer Hotel from the Grand Canal

The Bauer Hotel is a historic five-star hotel located on the north bank of the Grand Canal in the San Marco sestiere of Venice, Italy, near the Piazza San Marco. It closed in November 2022 for renovations, with plans to reopen in 2025.

== History ==
The hotel was founded in 1880 as the Grand Hotel d'Italie Bauer-Grünwald by Mr. Bauer, a director of Venice's Hotel de la Ville, and Julius (Giulio) Grünwald, an Austrian who married Bauer's daughter.

The main hotel building, facing the Grand Canal, was rebuilt from 1900 to 1902, to designs by architect Giovanni Sardi in an eclectic neo-Gothic style, which has been described as "perhaps the most significant representative of late-nineteenth century Venetian medieval mannerism".

On the southwest corner is the Canal Bar, a large ground-level terrace surrounded by a stone fretwork fence; at the corner there stands and a 3.6m tall statue of a woman representing Italy, a work of Carlo Lorenzetti. Before the hotel's construction, this was a public square called dei Felzi. The hotel's site previously held a 15th-century building in the "Arabo-Byzantine" style, which was demolished in 1844. Some fragments of that building were incorporated into Sardi's construction.

In 1930, Grünwald's heirs sold the Hotel Bauer-Grünwald to Arnaldo Bennati, a Ligurian shipbuilder. An extra floor was added on top in 1939 by Giovanni or Giuseppe Berti. The 7th-floor terrace "Settimo Cielo" is the highest terrace in Venice.

The hotel was closed for much of the 1940s, during which time Bennati undertook extensive renovations and added an extension to the hotel in the rear, facing the Campo San Moisè. The new wing was designed by Marino Meo in 1945 and completed in 1949.

The adjacent San Moisè church, with "the busiest façade in town", contrasts with the travertine cladding and light-colored marble columns of the Bauer extension, which has been called "brutally modernist in its plainness"; Joseph Brodsky described the juxtaposition as "Albert Speer having a pizza capricciosa".

In 1999, Francesca Bortolotto Possati, granddaughter of Arnaldo Bennati, became the chairwoman and CEO of the hotel. The hotel underwent a major renovation that year, overseen by Bortolotto Possati. The 1949 wing was marketed as the Hotel Bauer, while the older section was separately marketed as the Hotel Bauer Palazzo. Elliott Management and Blue Skye investments acquired the hotel through a series of debt restructuring deals between 2017 and 2019. In 2020, the Austrian real estate investment group Signa bought the hotel.

The hotel closed in November 2022 for a major renovation. It plans to reopen in 2025, managed by Rosewood Hotels as the Rosewood Hotel Bauer. The hotel is a member of Leading Hotels of the World.

In April 2024, Signa (by that point insolvent) arranged a sale of the shuttered hotel for an undisclosed amount to German industrialist family business Schoeller Group. However, the deal was stopped by Signa's primary financier, US-based King Street Capital Management, which instead assumed direct ownership of the hotel and sold it in November 2024 to Mohari Hospitality and Omnam Investment Group for €300 million, as work continued on renovations, with Rosewood still on board to operate the hotel once it reopens.

== Services ==
The Bauer offers 56 suites and 135 rooms.

The hotel restaurant is De Pisis. Breakfast is served on the 7th floor terrace, the Settimo Cielo, which in the evening serves drinks and snacks. The Canal Bar is outside, at ground level, and the B Bar offers live jazz performances.

== Location ==
To the left of the hotel, across the Rio San Moisè, is the Palazzo Treves-Barozzi, and to its right, separated by the Calle Tredici Martiri, is the Ca' Giustinian. The hotel's main entrance is on the north, on the Campo San Moisè. On its west runs the Rio San Moisè, on which it has a boat landing. It faces the Dogana and the Salute across the Grand Canal.

== Other Bauer properties in Venice ==
For a period in the 2010s, the Bauer group operated three additional properties: the Residenza Grunwald (formerly Bauer Casa Nova), located adjacent to the hotel on the Campo San Moisè; and the Bauer Palladio and the Villa F, both located on the Giudecca, facing San Marco across the Giudecca Canal.

== In literature ==
The Bauer-Grünwald is one of the settings of Chekhov's novella An Anonymous Story (1893).

== Gallery ==
Bauer Hotel

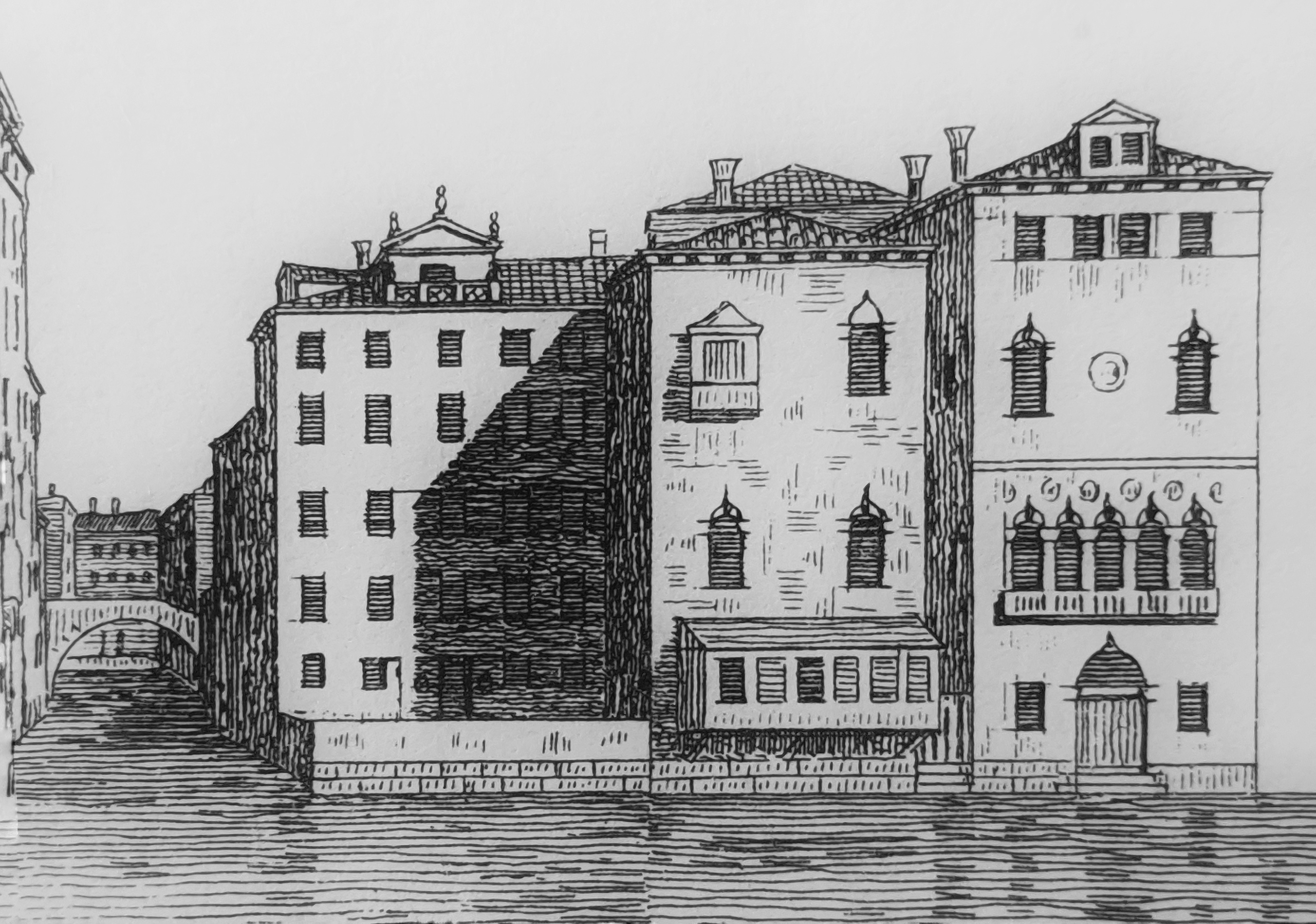
Site of Bauer in 1828, before 1844 and 1900 demolitions

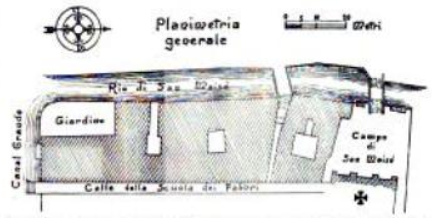
Ground plan of 1902

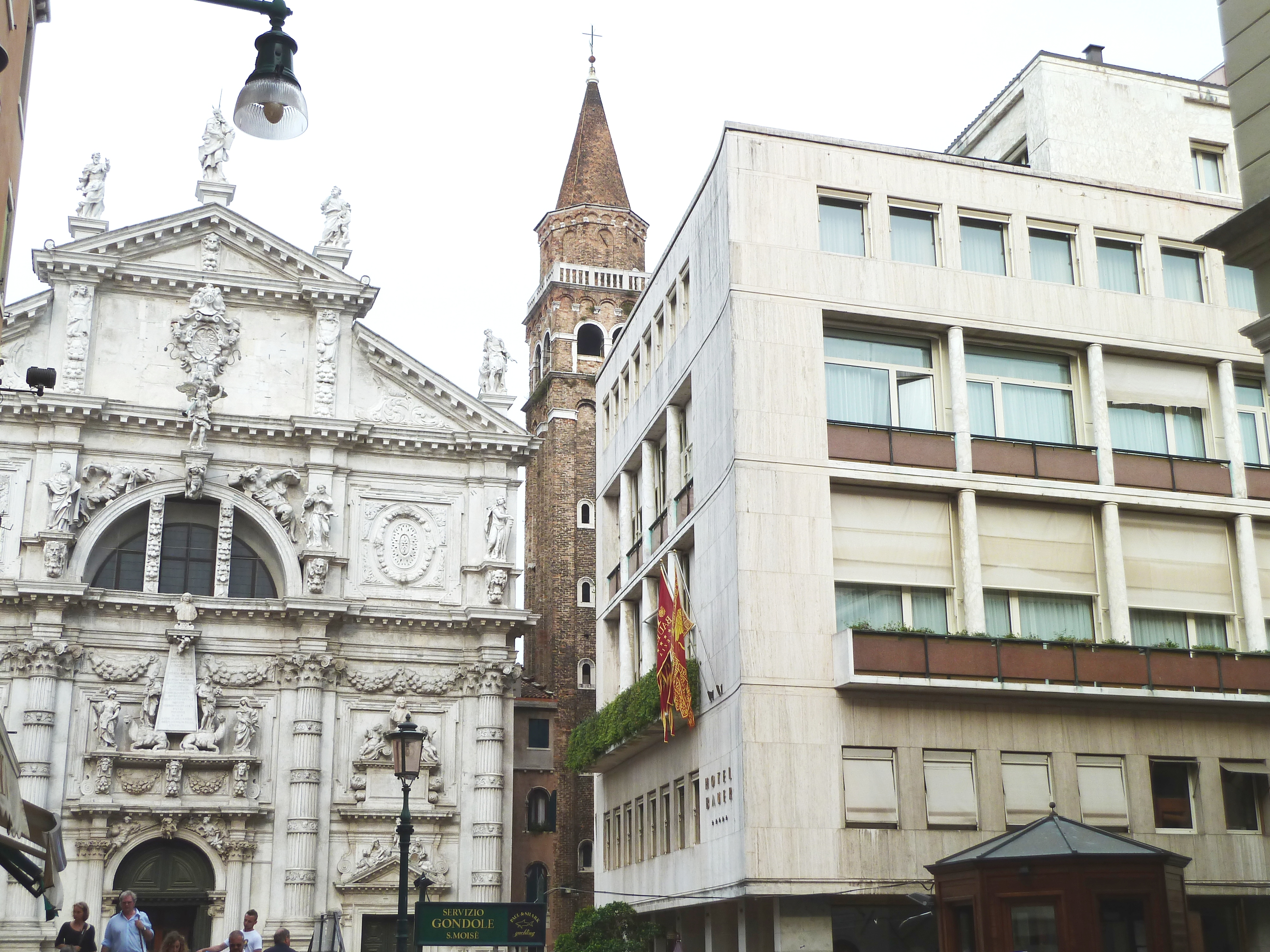
Elaborate façade of San Moisè contrasting with the modernist façade of the Bauer

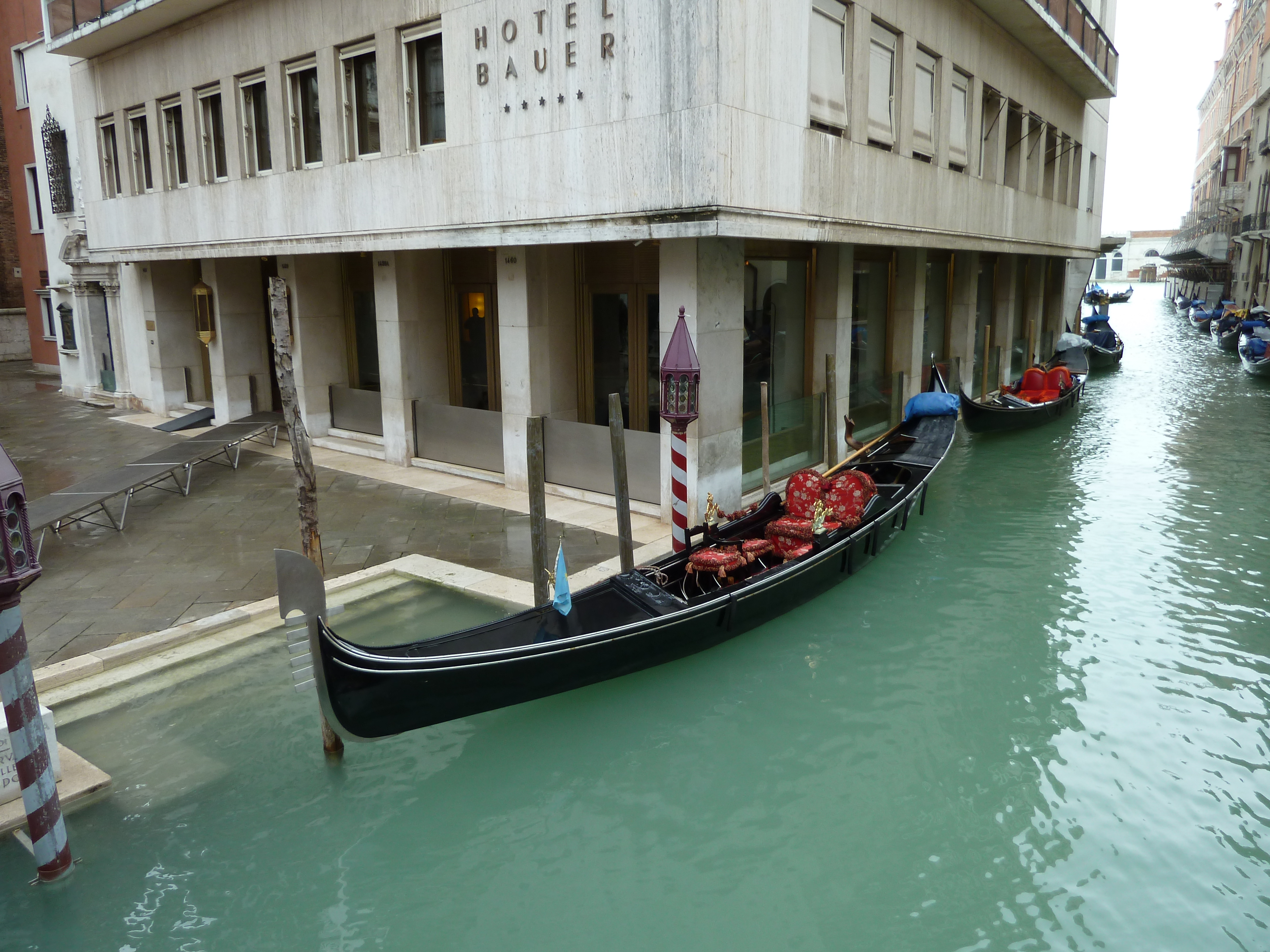
The San Moisè entrance
