= Richard Harvey =

Richard Harvey may refer to:

== Music ==
- Richard Harvey (composer) (born September 1953), British musician and composer known for his film and television soundtracks
- Richard Harvey (drummer), co-founding member of Australian rock band Divinyls

== Sports ==
- Richard Harvey (American football) (born 1966), former American football linebacker
- Richard Harvey (footballer) (born 1969), English former football player
- Richard Harvey (cricketer) (born 1974), English cricketer
- Lefty Harvey (Richard Harvey, born 1890), American baseball player

== Medicine ==
- Richard P Harvey (scientist), professor of heart research at the University of New South Wales
- Richard J Harvey (surgeon), professor of rhinology and skull base surgery at the University of New South Wales

== Others ==
- Richard Harvey (astrologer) (1560–1630), English theologian and controversialist
- Richard Harvey (priest) (1864–1944), British clergyman
- Richard Harvey (politician) (born 1985), Australian politician
- J. Richard Harvey, professor of accounting

== See also ==
- Richard Harvey Chambers (1906–1994), United States federal judge
- Richard Hervy, MP for Lostwithiel
