= Mary Cooper =

Mary Cooper may refer to:

- Mary Cooper (publisher) (died 1761), English publisher and bookseller
- Mary Little Cooper (born 1946), U.S. federal judge
- Mary-Charlotte Cooper, bassist and vocalist for The Subways

== Characters ==
- Mary Cooper (The Big Bang Theory), a character in The Big Bang Theory and Young Sheldon
- Mary Cooper (Torchwood), a recurring character in Torchwood
- Mary Cooper, a character in Harlots

== See also ==
- Cooper (surname)
