= Jean-Pierre Versini-Campinchi =

French lawyer (1939–2023)

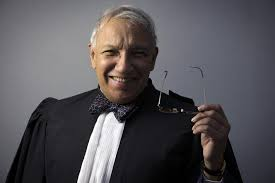
- Born: 12 November 1939; Ambleny, France
- Died: 12 October 2023 (aged 83); Paris, France
- Occupation: Lawyer

Jean-Pierre Versini-Campinchi (12 November 1939 – 12 October 2023) was a French lawyer and a member of the Paris Bar Association.

== Biography ==
Versini-Campinchi was born on 12 November 1939 in Ambleny, In the family home where he would live his whole life. He was of Corsican origin on his father's side, with the Versini and Campinchi families coming from villages along the Golfe de Sagone. He was the grand-nephew of César Campinchi, a prominent lawyer, a member of the Chamber of Deputies, and Minister of the Navy in the French Third Republic. His mother was of Martinican origin and raised by his maternal grandfather, Robert Attuly, a magistrate and the first West Indian to serve on the Court of Cassation. Married at the age of 20, Versini-Campinchi had three daughters from a first marriage and two more children from a second. His son, François, was also a lawyer.

Versini-Campinchi first specialized in commercial and highly contentious cases before moving towards criminal law in the 1980s. His firm was made up of three partners: himself, Fanny Colin, and Alexandre Merveille. The firm mainly dealt with criminal cases and commercial disputes. He was a member of the Paris Bar Association from 2003 to 2005.

In the 1990s, Versini-Campinchi represented GIFCO in a case of financing the French Communist Party, in which he obtained recusal of the president of the correctional chamber. In the Michel Mouillot case, he defended the former mayor of Cannes accused of corruption and obtained the recusal of investigating judge Murciano de Grasse. At the end of the 1990s and start of the 2000s, he represented businessman Jeffrey Steiner at the beginning of the Elf Affair. He also represented Jean-Christophe Mitterrand during the Mitterrand–Pasqua affair, in which he was acquitted on charges of human trafficking.

Versini-Campinchi represented founder of Buffalo Grill Christian Picart, who was accused of violating the embargo on English meats allegedly responsible for Creutzfeldt–Jakob disease. During the trial, Versini-Campinchi was sanctioned by the Paris Bar Association for violating the secrecy of the investigation. The case was taken up to the Court of Cassation and the European Court of Human Rights, which are studied today as case law on the interception of telephone communications between a lawyer and their client.

In the Agnès Le Roux Affair, Versini-Campinchi, alongside François Saint-Pierre, defended Maurice Agnelet, who was convicted of the murder of Agnès Le Roux. However, Agnelet maintained his innocence and was eventually acquitted of the charges. He represented Prime Minister François Fillon in his opposition to Jean-Pierre Jouyet. He also represented Vinci SA following a complaint from the Association Sherpa on the treatment of construction workers in Qatar. In the Uramin affair, he represented former Areva president Anne Lauvergeon. In 2017, he became the lawyer for Bernard Laporte, president of the French Rugby Federation. In 2019, he defended Éliane Houlette, former National Financial Prosecutor (Parquet national financier), prosecuted by the Conseil supérieur de la magistrature.

For many years, Versini-Campinchi campaigned to remove authorization for lawyers to wear decorations on their attire. He also refused the Legion of Honour bestowed upon him by the Minister of Justice in 2011.

Outside of his professional life, Versini-Campinchi also inspired a bill allowing parents to declare their home to be the birthplace of their children, not the hospital in which they were born. He created the Association Renaissance des Villages alongside Jean-Cyril Spinetta.

Jean-Pierre Versini-Campinchi died on 12 October 2023, at the age of 83.

== Book ==
- Papiers d'identités (2020)
