= Joseph Dugan =

- Born: March 1, 1925; Osceola Mills, Pennsylvania, United States
- Died: July 3, 2007 (aged 82); Franklin Lakes, New Jersey, United States
- Occupation: Businessman

Joseph H. Dugan Sr. (March 1, 1925 – July 3, 2007) led L.B. Foster Company as President and chief executive officer from 1986 to 1990, during the time that the company re-established itself as a leading manufacturer and distributor of industrial products serving the infrastructure markets. Prior to joining LB Foster, Dugan was chief financial officer of Todd Shipyards Corporation from 1976 to 1985; Treasurer of Fairchild Corporation from 1969 to 1986; and he held senior finance positions at the Stratos Division of Fairchild, Soundscriber Corporation and Airpax Electronics Corporation. Dugan served as a member of the board of directors of LB Foster, Todd Shipyards and several investment funds of the U.S. Trust Corporation.

Dugan served in the US Navy during World War II as a Chief Petty Officer aboard the USS Memphis in the Southern Atlantic Theater and following the war attended Villanova University, graduating with a BS Degree in Economics in 1950.

Dugan obtained his Master of Business Administration from the State University of New York in 1967. Dugan retired from LB Foster in 1990 and spent over 15 years volunteering his time and talents for Christian organizations located throughout Northern New Jersey. He was active in the Most Blessed Sacrament Roman Catholic Church, the Diocese of Paterson and the Archdiocese of Newark, New Jersey. Dugan died at his home on July 3, 2007.

- Father: Joseph L. Dugan, former mayor of Osceola Mills
- Mother: Oral Ruth Dugan (Maiden Name: Williams)
- Spouse: Florence C. Dugan
- Children: Joseph, Michael, Francis, Patricia, and John
