= Francesca Bortolotto Possati =

Italian hotelier

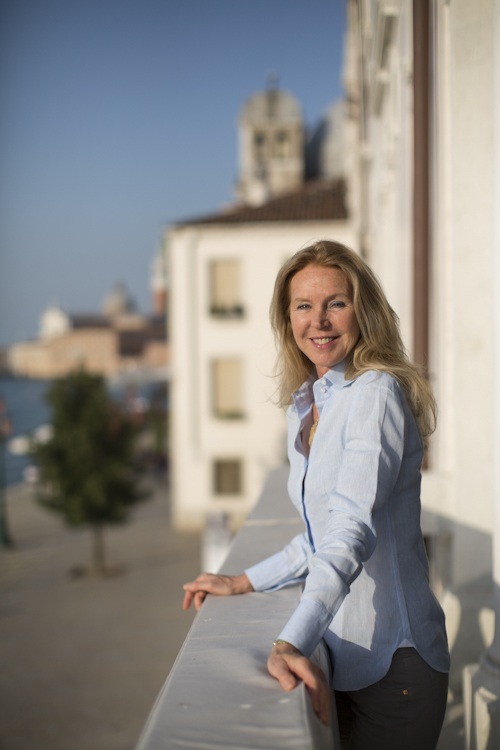
- Bortolotto Possati on a balcony of the Villa F. (2012)
- Occupations: Entrepreneur, author, interior designer, hotelier

Francesca Bortolotto Possati is an Italian entrepreneur, author, interior designer, philanthropist and hotelier. She is the chief executive officer of the Bauer Hotel group in Venice, and the granddaughter of Arnaldo Bennati, a Ligurian shipbuilder who purchased the Bauer Hotel in 1930. She was the only female CEO in the city of Venice as of 2008.

== Biography ==
Bortolotto Possati was raised in Venice, and moved to the United States in 1982 with her then-husband, Marco Possati. During her time in the U.S., she earned two degrees in English. Following her studies, she settled in New York for a time, where she became an independent consultant for interior designers and decorators.

Upon her return to Venice in the late 1990s, she started a real estate agency, but soon after took control of the family estates at the Bauer Hotel.

Bortolotto Possati is a member of the board of Save Venice Inc. and of the board of Altagamma, and sponsored the Zuecca Project Space, a non-profit area on the Giudecca island that hosts art exhibitions and events. She owns high-end real estate in Venice, a winery, and a dairy company.

She has published a recipe book, Celebrate in Venice, co-authored by Csaba dalla Zorza.

== Personal life ==
Bortolotto Possati divorced from her husband, Marco Possati, in 1993; she remains unmarried. She has two children, Alessandro and Olimpia.
