= Pierre Antoine Poiteau =

French botanist and scientific illustrator (1766–1854)

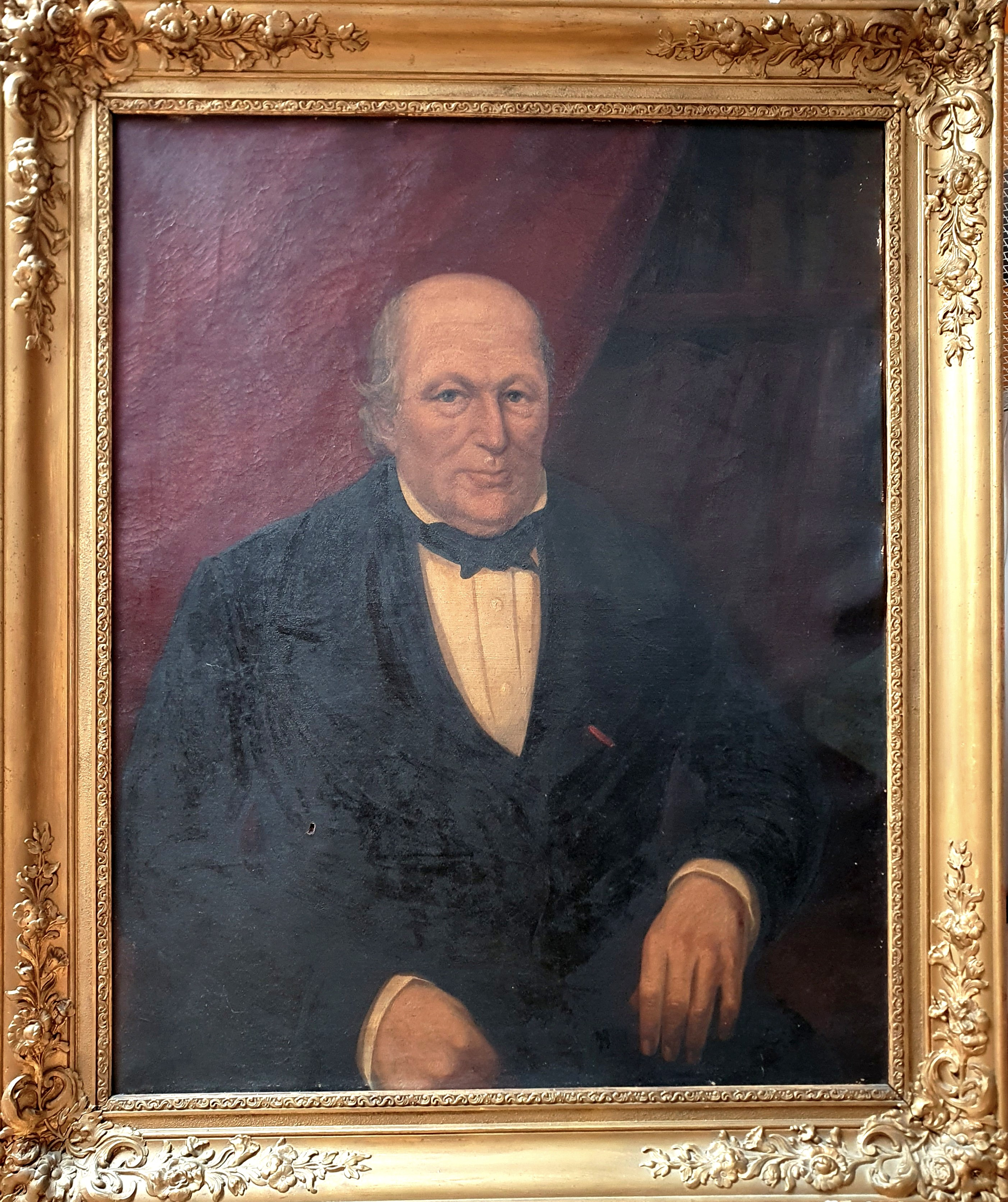
Pierre-Antoine Poiteau circa 1850

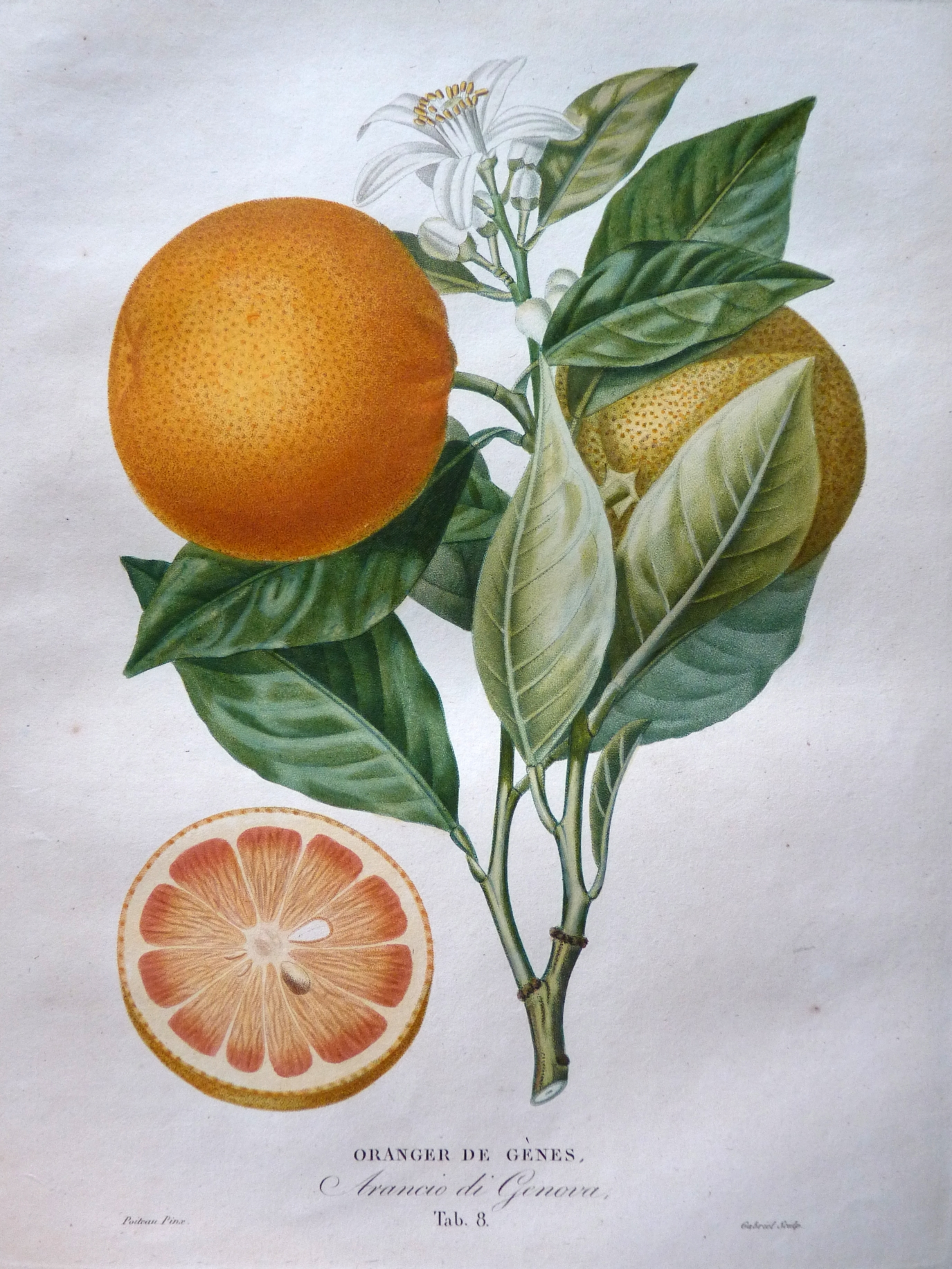
Plate from l’Histoire Naturelle des Orangers

Pierre-Antoine Poiteau (23 March 1766 – 27 February 1854) was a French botanist, gardener and botanical artist.

== Biography ==
He was born in Ambleny, France. After having worked in kitchen gardens and for the Parisian market gardeners, he was appointed by André Thouin (1746–1824) garçon jardinier in 1790 at the Muséum national d'Histoire naturelle of Paris. There he studied the Linnaeus' Systema vegetabilium and the art of painting with the artist of the museum Gérard van Spaendonck (1746–1822) but his main influence is Redouté (1759–1840). Thouin named him, two years later, head of the Botanical school of Paris, but in 1793, Daubenton chose him to establish a botanic school and garden in Bergerac. This project failed and in 1796 Thouin offered Poiteau to go to Santo Domingo. He was arrested as soon as he landed because he did not have official papers to justify his presence. Soon afterwards he was in Haiti, at the head of the new botanical garden of Cape. Receiving no wages, he had to join the administration as an assistant to Hédouville and Roume, the governors of the island. In 1802, he brought back to France six hundred packets of seeds and 1,200 species, all named and classified by him. Among them were 97 species of mushrooms and 30 species of lichens. He published, in Paris in 1808 with Pierre Jean François Turpin (1775–1840) whom he met in Haiti, Flora Parisiensis secundum systema sexuale deposita et plantarum circa Lutetiam sponte nascentium descriptiones, icones....

After some years of free literary activities, he was appointed in 1815 head of the Royal tree nursery of Versailles. In 1816, he published a description of the plants cultivated in the botanical garden of the School of medicine of Paris. Two years later, with Antoine Risso (1777–1845), he published Histoire naturelle des orangers (Natural history of the orange trees).

In 1818, Poiteau went to French Guiana where he supervised the cultures of the plantations of the royal houses. Back in France in 1822, he was appointed head gardener of the castle of Fontainebleau. From 1829 to 1851 he directed the Revue horticole (Horticultural review). In 1835, with Pierre-Jean-François Turpin, he published a new edition of the Traité des arbres fruitiers (Treatise of the fruit trees) by Henri Louis Duhamel du Monceau (1700–1782) and, in 1846, Pomologie française. Recueil des plus beaux fruits cultivés en France... (French pomology). In 1848 and 1853 the two volumes of his Cours d'horticulture (Lessons of horticulture) were published. A member of many scientific societies, Poiteau later became head of the museum of natural history, to which he offered all the animals and plants he had brought back from Guiana. Poiteau discovered numerous species of plants and animals, he even created some families (cyclanthae, for example). As a gardener and a pomologist, he much contributed to the amelioration of the edible fruits. As an artist, he is appreciated and his colored lithographs are sought after by amateurs. On this ground, he is often compared to Pierre-Joseph Redouté. He died in Paris.

== Bibliography ==
- On WorldCat
