= Dave Frankel =

American weather presenter (1957–2025)

Dave Frankel (1957 – February 26, 2025) was an American television weatherman and news anchor in Philadelphia before leaving the air to become an attorney.

== Early life and education ==
Frankel grew up in Monmouth County, New Jersey. He graduated from Dartmouth College and cum laude from Villanova University School of Law.

== Broadcasting career ==
Frankel joined Philadelphia’s WPVI-TV 6-ABC in 1984 as an investigative reporter, reporting on a variety of topics including dangerous seafood, Philadelphia trash collection and the lack of production of the sanitation crews, the perils of pesticides, the risks of tired truck drivers in a story called “Big Rigs, Big Risks”, a trip to Haiti to track down illegal dumping of Philadelphia’s trash, an exclusive jailhouse interview with cocaine empire dentist Larry Lavin, and an expose about Philadelphia’s mob family called Disorganized Crime.

In 1989, he became the morning weatherman, co-hosting the morning newscast alongside Monica Malpass and later Rick Williams. The newscast became the most viewed local morning news show in the country. Dave was a prominent and popular personality at the station. On February 26, 2025, 6abc aired a segment on Dave Frankel’s career at Action News.

In 1997 he moved onto KYW-TV CBS-3 where he anchored the 6pm news with the late Siani Lee. Dave was also a freelance reporter for ESPN.

Frankel received two Emmy Awards: one for a report on a bionic breakthrough enabling a deaf child to hear and another for a five-part series on balding titled “Hair Today, Gone Tomorrow.”

== Legal career ==
In 2003, at age 46, Frankel enrolled at Villanova Law School.

After a stint as a practicing entertainment lawyer with Montgomery, McCracken, Walker & Rhoads in Philadelphia representing broadcast journalists, Frankel co-founded the law firm of Frankel & Kershenbaum to represent children with special needs and their families in special education law, civil rights, and personal injury matters.

== Community involvement ==
Frankel had a longstanding relationship with Alex’s Lemonade Stand Foundation, proudly hosting its Original Lemonade Stand annually and helping raise significant funds for pediatric cancer research. He also served as an auctioneer for various charitable events and hosted Radnor Township’s Memorial Day Parade.

== Personal life and death ==
Frankel was married to Marjie (née Schlessinger). They had three children—Bailey, Scott, and Charlie— and six grandchildren.

He died from complications of primary progressive aphasia, a form of frontotemporal dementia, on February 26, 2025, at the age of 67.
