= Michael A. Shipp =

American judge (born 1965)

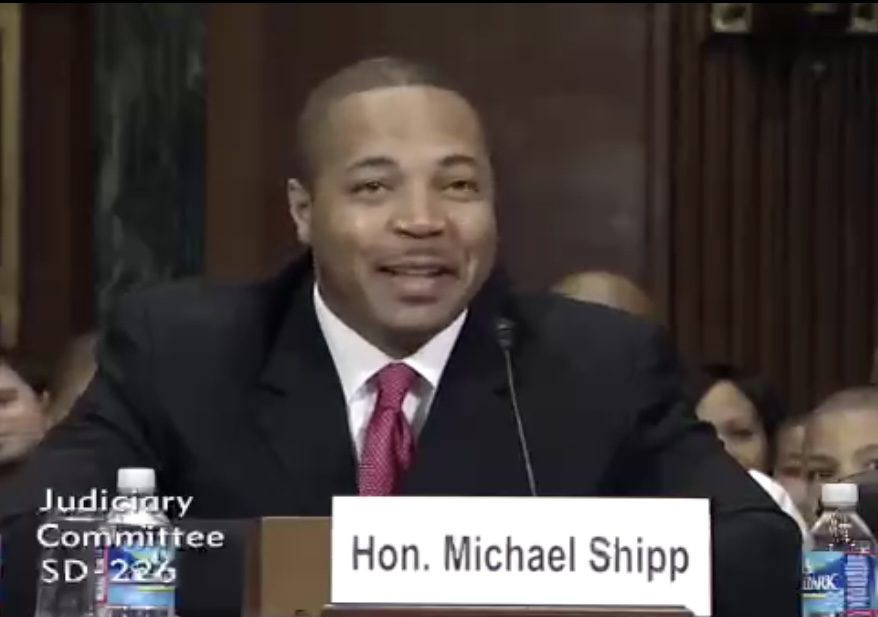

Judge of the United States District Court for the District of New Jersey
- Incumbent
- Assumed office July 26, 2012
- Appointed by: Barack Obama
- Preceded by: Mary Little Cooper

Magistrate Judge of the United States District Court for the District of New Jersey
- In office 2007 – July 26, 2012

Personal details
- Born: Michael Andre Shipp; October 1965 (age 60) Paterson, New Jersey, U.S.
- Education: Rutgers University (BS); Seton Hall University (JD); Duke University (LLM)

Michael Andre Shipp (born October 1965) is a United States district judge of the United States District Court for the District of New Jersey. He is a former United States magistrate judge of the same court.

== Biography ==
Shipp was born in October 1965 in Paterson, New Jersey. He received his Bachelor of Science from Rutgers University in 1987. He received his Juris Doctor from Seton Hall University School of Law in 1994. He served as a law clerk for Justice James H. Coleman of the New Jersey Supreme Court from 1994 to 1995. From 1995 to 2003, he worked as an associate at Skadden, Arps, Slate, Meagher & Flom LLP in Newark, New Jersey. From 2003 to 2007, he worked in the New Jersey Office of the Attorney General, first as an Assistant Attorney General in charge of Consumer Protection and later as Counsel to the Attorney General. In 2007, he was appointed as a United States magistrate judge of the United States District Court for the District of New Jersey (the first African American U.S. magistrate judge in that district) holding that position until his elevation to District Judge on that court. He is the brother of former NFL player, Marcel Shipp. Justice Shipp is a member of Alpha Phi Alpha fraternity. Shipp received his LLM in judicial studies from Duke Law School in 2020.

=== Federal judicial service ===
On January 23, 2012, President Barack Obama nominated Shipp to be a United States District Judge for the United States District Court for the District of New Jersey to the seat vacated by Judge Mary Little Cooper, who assumed senior status in 2011. He received a hearing before the Senate Judiciary Committee on March 14, 2012 and his nomination was reported to the floor on April 19, 2012, by a voice vote, with Senator Lee recorded as voting no based on unrelated general principles.

Despite the relatively uncontroversial nature of Shipp's nomination, Senator Rand Paul in July 2012 held up allowing an up-or-down, Senate floor vote on Shipp's nomination over an unrelated issue, involving Paul's desire to cut off all U.S. aid to Pakistan unless authorities there release Dr. Shakil Afridi. In a Senate floor speech on July 19, 2012, Paul announced his intention to hold up all Senate business until receiving a satisfactory answer to his question about why a Pakistani judicial panel has delayed Afridi's appeal of his conviction on charges related to assistance he provided to the CIA in the capture of Osama bin Laden. Paul also said he intended to seek a vote to terminate all aid to Pakistan. On July 19, 2012, Senate Majority Leader Harry Reid moved to invoke cloture in order to confirm Shipp's nomination. The cloture vote was vitiated on July 23, 2012 when Paul consented to a confirmation vote on the nomination. Shipp's nomination was confirmed that same day by a 91–1 vote, with Senator Mike Lee again casting the sole no vote. He received his commission on July 26, 2012.

== See also ==
- List of African-American federal judges
- List of African-American jurists

Legal offices
Preceded by Mary Little Cooper	Judge of the United States District Court for the District of New Jersey; 2012–present	Incumbent
