= Jennifer Santiago =

American journalist

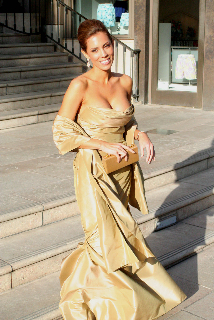
- Born: Jennifer Klarman
- Occupations: Attorney, freelance writer, photographer, journalist, model
- Notable work: Runnin' At Midnite (2001 film)
- Awards: Genesis Awards, Emmy

Jennifer Santiago is an attorney, freelance writer, photographer, model, and Emmy Award-winning reporter for HDNews.

== Early life and education ==
In 1997, she received her J.D. degree, with honors, from Villanova University School of Law in Pennsylvania where she was also a member of The Villanova Law Review.

== Career ==
In 1998, Santiago posed for pictorials (under her name at birth, Jennifer Klarman) that appeared in several Playboy special editions. In one of her pictorials, she posed alongside fellow Villanova Law School graduate and former Playboy playmate Victoria Zdrok.

Santiago is a lawyer, who began a journalism career with WFOR-TV, the CBS affiliate in Miami.

She co-produced the independent feature film Runnin' At Midnite, which was selected for several film festivals. The 2001 Chicano basketball drama was directed by Pablo Toledo.

Santiago cites her report that led to then governor Charlie Crist freeing a man named Richard Peay who was sentenced to a 25-year mandatory prison term as the highlight of her professional journalism career, according to an interview she did with Aventura Business Monthly.

In February 2006, Congressman Kendrick Meek sent President George W. Bush a copy of Santiago's report "Return to Haiti", urging the President to halt the deportations of Haitians because of an omission in the Haitian Refugee Immigration Fairness Act. "Return to Haiti" chronicled the story of an undocumented Haitian migrant who was sent back to Haiti after living in the United States for 15 years. He left behind three U.S. born children and a wife. "Return to Haiti" won numerous awards and recognition from prominent Haitian Advocates such as Congressman Meek and Haitian-American political activist Marleine Bastien.

Santiago, a reported vegetarian, received a Genesis Award in 2007 from the Humane Society of the United States. The award was given in recognition of a series of reports including "Stopping the Seal Hunt" — which also appeared on the CBS Evening News.

To mark his first 100 days in office, Florida Governor Charlie Crist gave Santiago an exclusive interview in Tallahassee.

Bloggers have called her "the Angelina Jolie of news" because of her diverse resume and penchant for traveling to third-world countries alone for news stories.

== Awards for television reporting ==
- Emmy Winner On Camera-Talent/Focus on South Florida 2007.
- SFBJA Award Reporting "A Sanctuary From Slavery" 2007.
- HSUS Genesis Award "Stopping the Seal Hunt" 2007.
- Emmy Nominee Historic/Cultural Reporting "Meet the Masai"; Public Affairs "Focus on South Florida" 2006.
- Telly Award Winner Reporting "Stopping the Seal Hunt" 2007.
- Chuck Stone Award of Excellence Reporting "A Sanctuary From Slavery"Problem Of Child Slavery 2007.
- Emmy Winner Reporting "Children for Sale"
- Telly Award Winner Reporting "Save the Elephants" 2006.
- Telly Award Winner Reporting "Return to Haiti" 2006.
- SPJ Sunshine State Nominee Investigative Reporting "A Painful Sentence" 2006.
- SPJ Sunshine State Award Investigative Reporting "Return to Haiti"2005.
- SFBJA Award Reporting "Return to Haiti" 2005.
- HSUS Genesis Award Commendation Reporting "Save the Elephants" 2005.
- Emmy Nominee Reporting "Death Row Debate" 2002.
