= Victoria Zdrok =

American pornographic actress (born 1973)

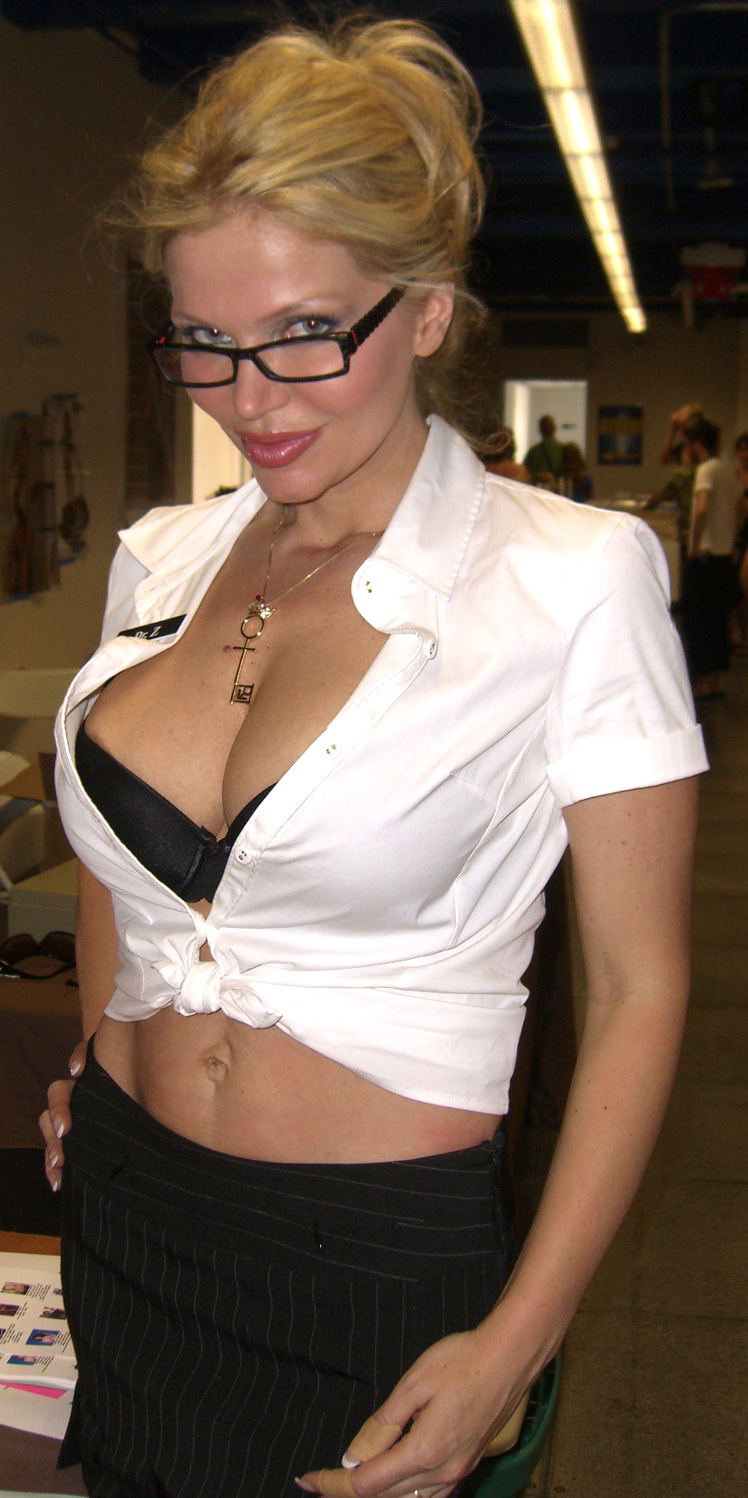
- Zdrok in 2008
- Born: March 3, 1973 (age 53); Kyiv, Ukrainian Soviet Socialist Republic
- Other names: Victoria Alexandrovna Zdrok; Victoria Nika Zdrok
- Education: West Chester University; Villanova University; Drexel University
- Occupations: Pornographic film actress; author; model
- Spouses: Alexander Zdrok; John Wilson

Playboy centerfold appearance
- October 1994
- Preceded by: Kelly Gallagher
- Succeeded by: Donna Perry

Personal details
- Height: 5 ft 9 in (1.75 m)

Victoria Zdrok Wilson (born March 3, 1973) is an American pornographic film actress, author, and model. She was Playboy's Playmate for October 1994. In June 2002 she became Penthouse magazine's Pet of the Month, and was later chosen as their 2004 Penthouse Pet of the Year. Zdrok is also a non-practicing attorney, as well as a clinical psychologist and sex therapist.

== Early life and education ==
Zdrok was born on March 3, 1973, in Kyiv, then the capital of the Ukrainian Soviet Socialist Republic. After immigrating to the United States, Zdrok did her undergraduate studies at West Chester University, obtained her J.D. from Villanova University School of Law, and her Ph.D. in psychology from Drexel University.

== Modeling career ==
Zdrok was crowned Philadelphia's "Best Beauty" in August 1994. In October of the same year, she became a Playboy centerfold as "Victoria Nika Zdrok".

Zdrok appeared in Penthouse as their June 2002 Pet of the Month. In 2004, she was named Penthouse Pet of the Year. She is the second centerfold, after Linn Thomas, to be both a Playboy Playmate and a Penthouse Pet.

== Filmography ==
- 2009 — Guide to Great Sex
- 2007 — Best of Facesitting POV 3
- 2006 — Asses of Face Destruction
- 2006 — Soloerotica 9
- 2005 — For Your Ass Only
- 2005 — Assturbators 2
- 2005 — Three's Cumpany
- 2004 — Lesbians in Lust
- 2004 — Dark Side
- 2003 — Temptation
- 2003 — Soloerotica 4
- 2002 — Bare-Skinned Captives
- 2000 — Centerfold Coeds: Girlfriends — Вера
- 1998 — Satin Smoke
- 1998 — Star of Jaipur

== Other work ==
Zdrok has written several books on sex, including The Anatomy of Pleasure and Dr. Z on Scoring: How to Pick Up, Seduce and Hook Up With Hot Women.

Anna-Marie Goddard	Julie Lynn Cialini	Neriah Davis	Becky DelosSantos	Shae Marks	Elan Carter
Traci Adell	Maria Checa	Kelly Gallagher	Victoria Zdrok	Donna Perry	Elisa Bridges

1970s	Evelyn Treacher	Stephanie McLean	Tina McDowall	Patricia Barrett	Avril Lund
1970s	Anneka Di Lorenzo	Laura Bennett Doone	Victoria Lynn Johnson	Dominique Maure	Cheryl Rixon
1980s	Isabella Ardigo	Danielle Deneux	Corinne Alphen	Sheila Kennedy	Linda Kenton
1980s	None	Cody Carmack	Mindy Farrar	Patty Mullen	Ginger Miller
1990s	Stephanie Page	Simone Brigitte	Jisel	Julie Strain	Sasha Vinni
1990s	Gina LaMarca	Andi Sue Irwin	Elizabeth Ann Hilden	Paige Summers	Nikie St. Gilles
2000s	Juliet Cariaga	Zdeňka Podkapová	Megan Mason	Sunny Leone	Victoria Zdrok
2000s	Martina Warren	Jamie Lynn	Heather Vandeven	Erica Ellyson	Taya Parker
2010s	Taylor Vixen	Nikki Benz	Jenna Rose	Nicole Aniston	Lexi Belle
2010s	Layla Sin	Kenna James	Jenna Sativa	Gina Valentina	Gianna Dior
2020s	Lacy Lennon	Kenzie Anne	Amber Marie	Tahlia Paris	Renee Olstead
2020s	Kassie Wallis	-	-	-	-
