= Giovanni Sardi =

Italian architect from Venice

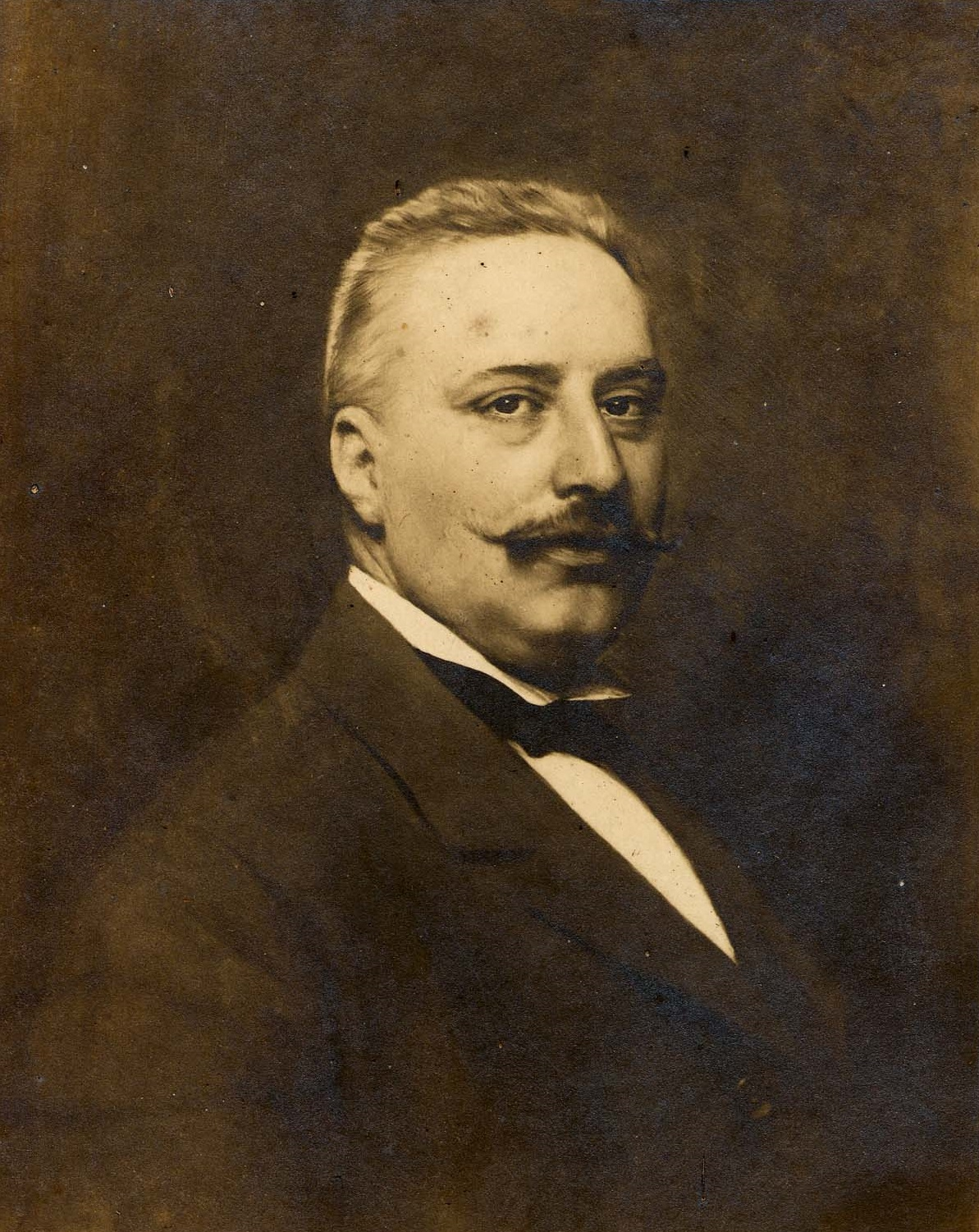
Giovanni Sardi

Giovanni Sardi (6 September 1863 – 26 June 1913) was an Italian architect, mainly active in his native Venice; his designs were an eclectic adaptation of gothic and byzantine elements.

== Biography ==
He was born to a craftsman of limited income. In 1875, he was able to enroll at the Venetian Academy of Fine Arts, where he studied under Giacomo Franco and the engineer Giovanni Antonio Romano. In 1898, he was commissioned by the hotelier Giulio Grünwald with the enlargement of his property, then known as the Hotel Bauer-Grünwald. The facade was remade in 1901 in a Venetian gothic or neo-gothic style. Sardi next major commission was the design of the Grand Hotel Excelsior in the Lido of Venice (1907–08). The large resort hotel including a mix of fanciful references to both gothic and Moorish architecture. The prestige of that construction also recommended him to more projects for the Lido, which was bustling with construction of beach villas, such as Villa Pasqualin (1912), now Villa Lisa, and Villa Fanna (1910–11). In the Venice of his day, his competition as an architect included Giovanni Sicher, Ernesto Corti, and Antonio Pedrazzoli. In 1915, he designed the Teatro Italia' (1915), now a supermarket, in central Venice.

In the terrafirme of the Veneto, mainly building around the area of Asolo and Treviso, he built a number of villas, of which few exist at all or as designed, including villa Guillion Mangilli in Cornuda (1903), villa Delord at Casella d’Asolo (1906–07), villa Boato in Mirano (1912–13), and the villino Guetta at Santa Maria della Rovere. He built himself a villa in Mogliano Veneto, near Treviso. He also designed the elementary school in the town. He died unexpectedly from an infection in 1913.

== Gallery ==
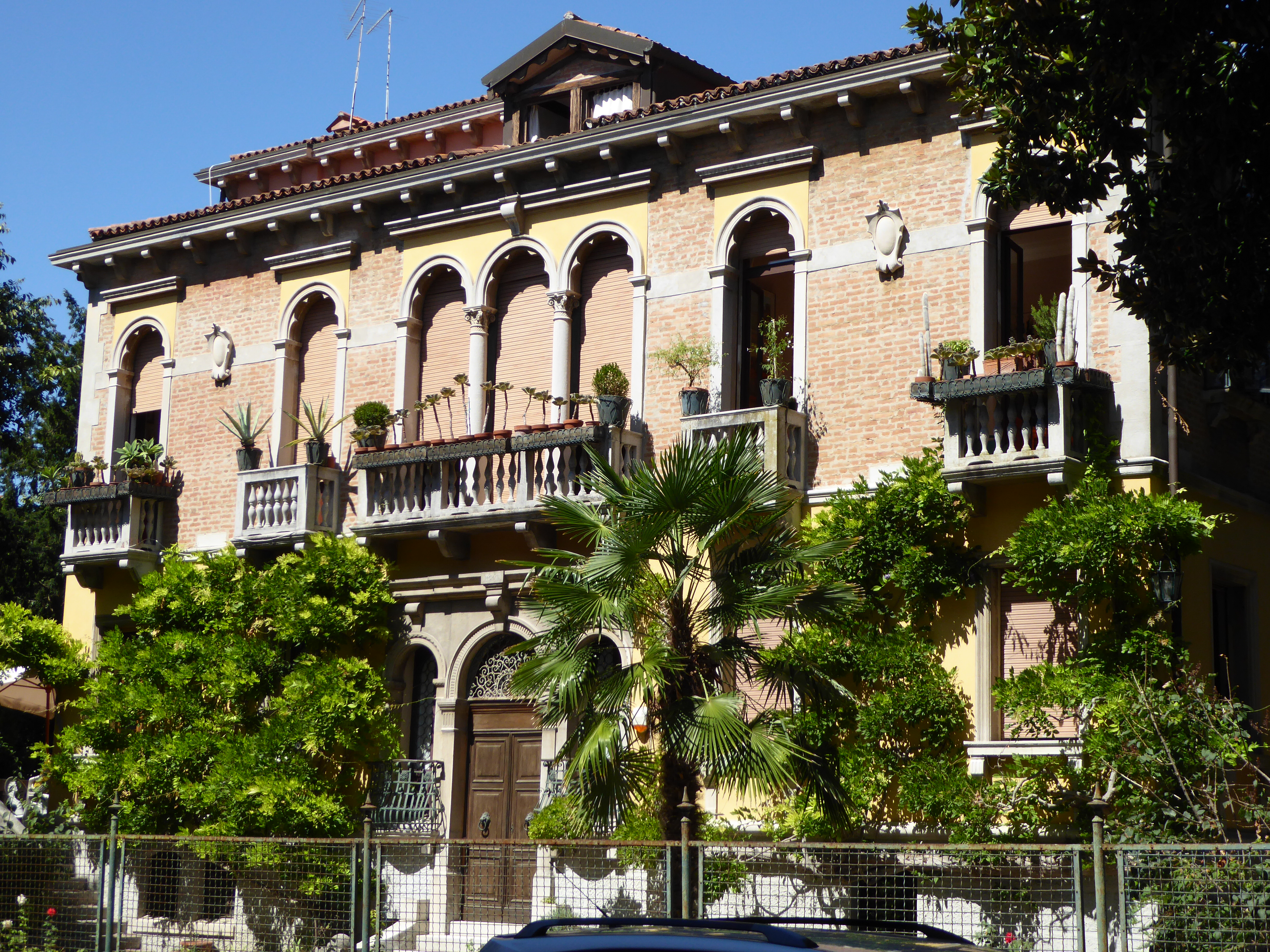
Villa Lisa

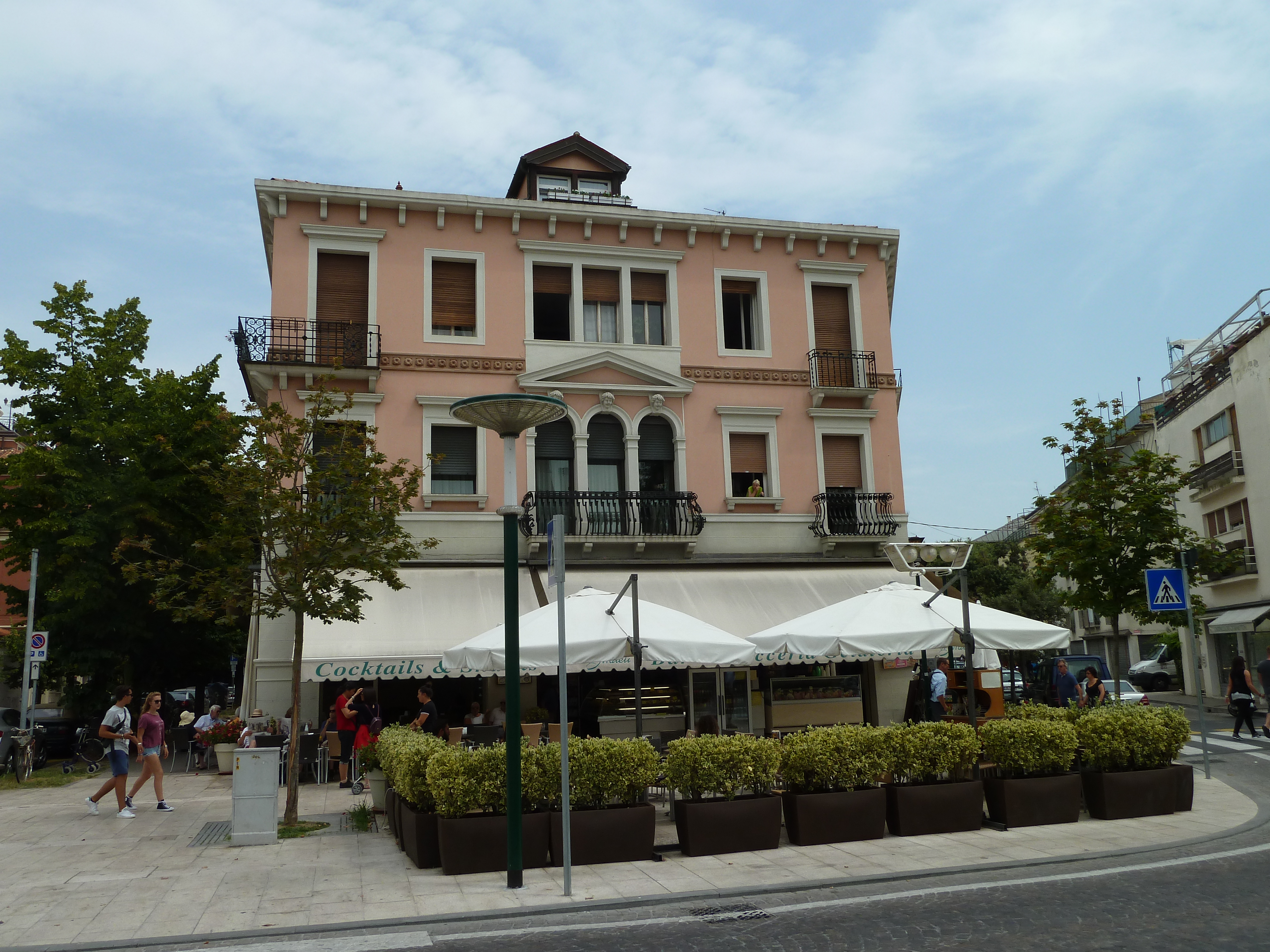
Villa Fanna

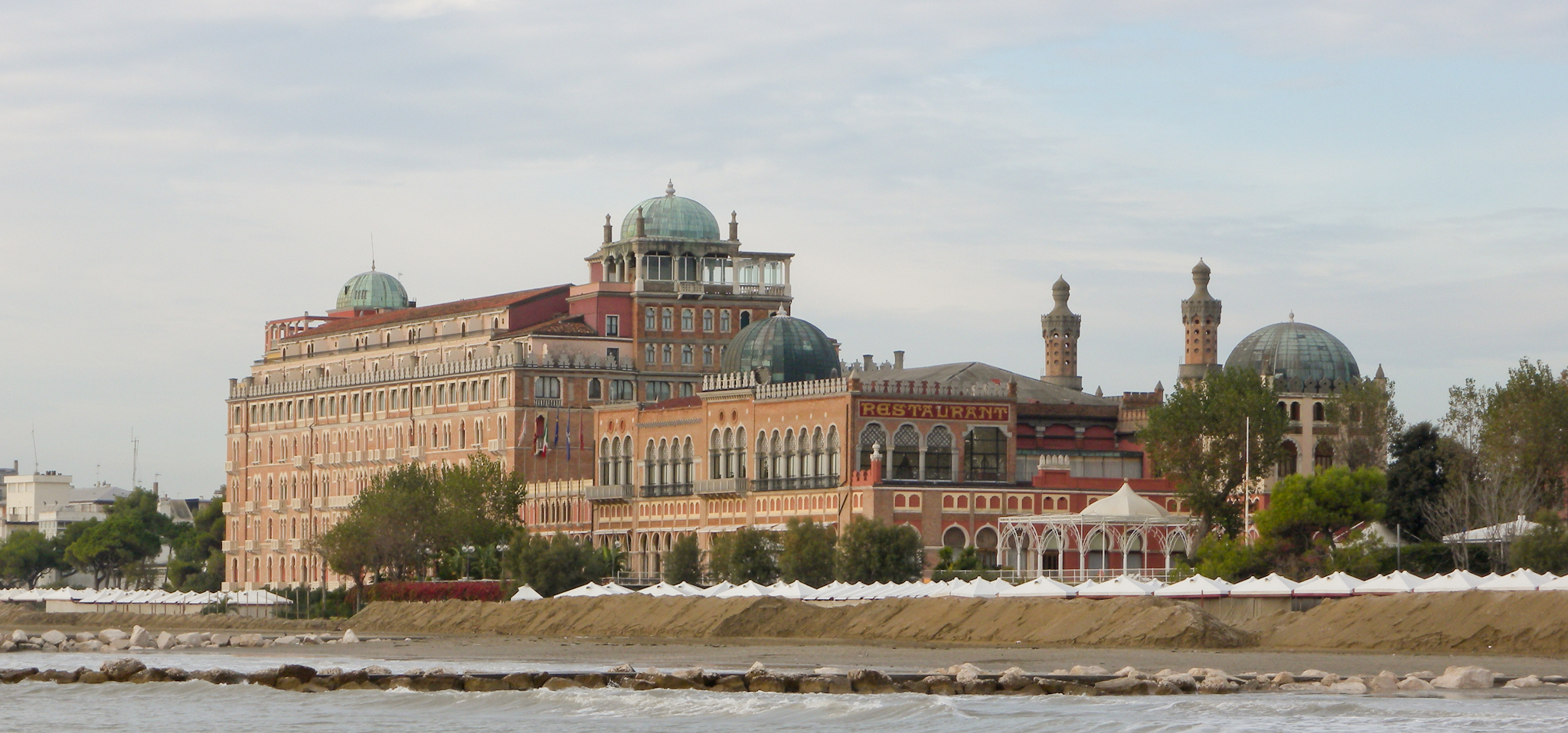
Hotel Excelsior, Lido of Venice

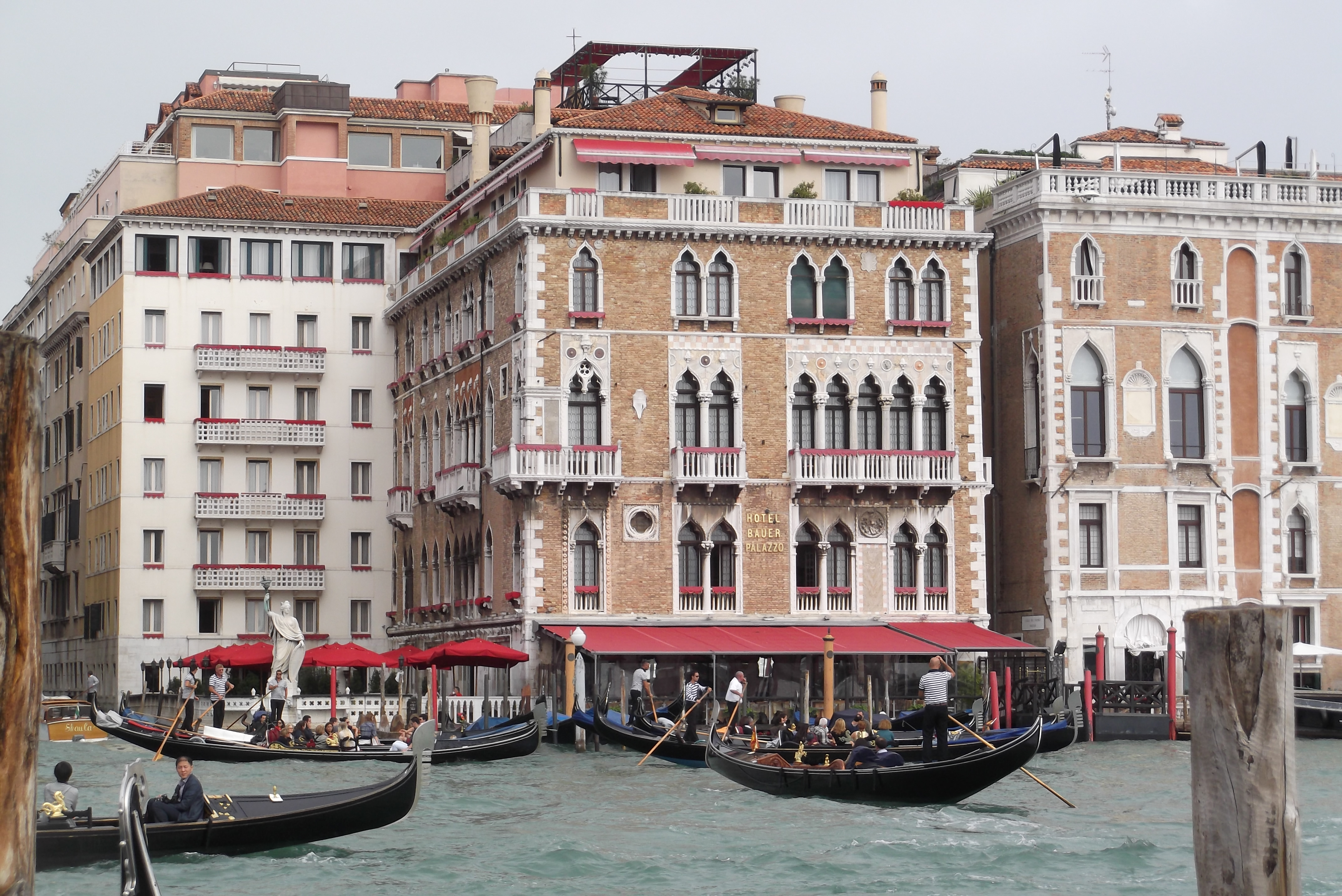
Hotel Bauer on the Grand Canal

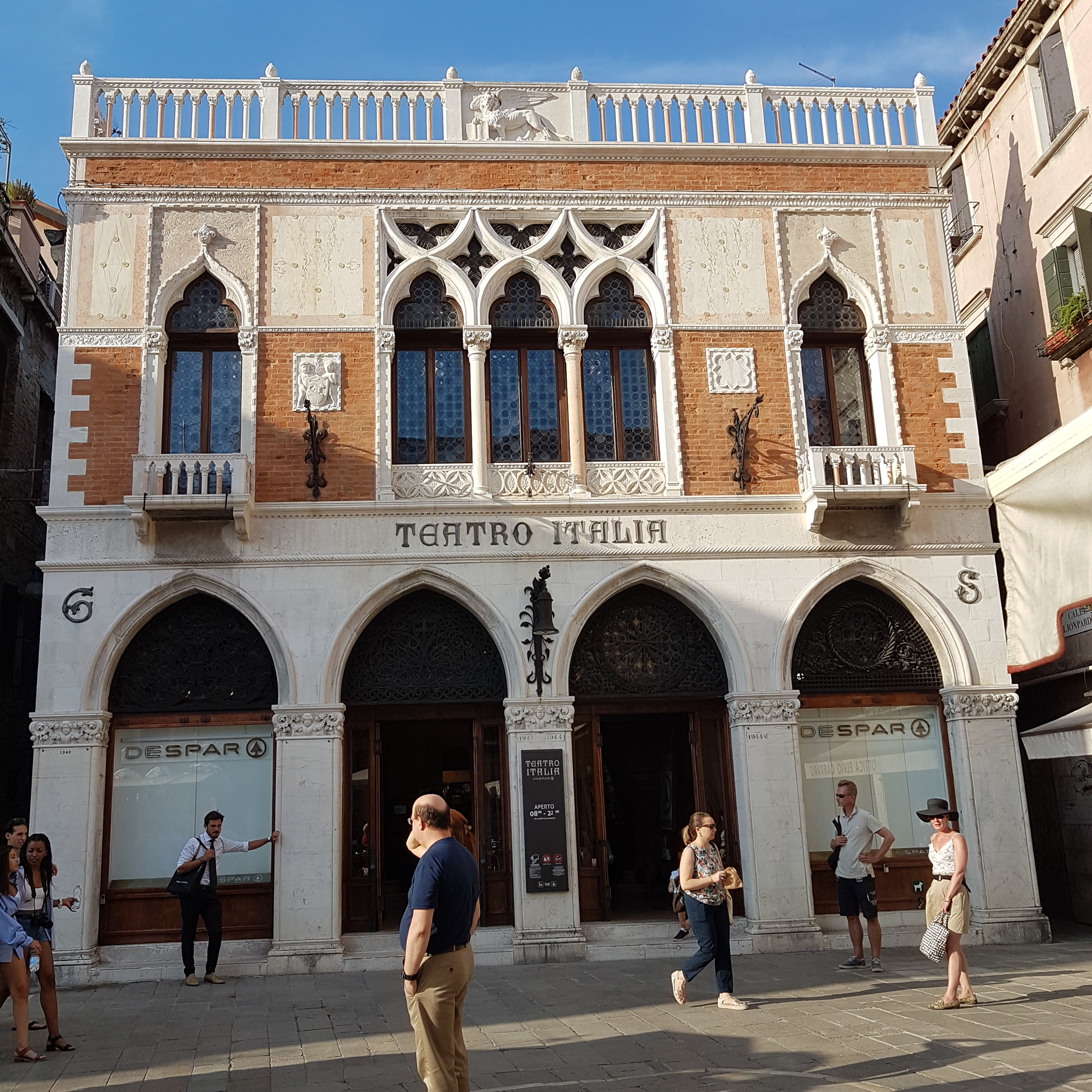
Teatro Italia
