= Villanova University School of Law =

Private law school in Villanova, Pennsylvania, US

Villanova University Charles Widger School of Law
- Parent school: Villanova University
- Religious affiliation: Roman Catholic (Augustinian)
- Established: 1953; 73 years ago
- School type: Private law school
- Dean: Mark Alexander
- Location: Villanova, Pennsylvania, United States
- Enrollment: 720
- USNWR ranking: 48th (2024)
- Website: law.villanova.edu

The Villanova University Charles Widger School of Law (known as Villanova Law) is the law school of Villanova University, a private Roman Catholic research university in Villanova, Pennsylvania. It was opened in 1953 and is approved by the American Bar Association (ABA) and a member of the Association of American Law Schools (AALS). Approximately 720 students study full-time in the J.D. program which offers more than 100 offerings including foundation courses, specialty offerings, drafting courses, clinical experiences, seminars, simulation courses and externships.

== Academics ==
The school has four degree programs:

- J.D.
- J.D./M.B.A. with School of Business
- J.D./LL.M. in Law and Taxation
- J.D./LL.M. in International Law

=== Juris Doctor (JD) ===
Villanova University Charles Widger School of Law offers a legal education designed to teach the rules of law and their application; to demonstrate how lawyers analyze legal issues and express arguments and conclusions; to inculcate the skills of the counselor, advocate, and decision maker; and to explore the ethical and moral dimensions of law practice and professional conduct.

=== Joint JD/MBA program ===
The Villanova University School of Law and the Villanova School of Business offer a joint-degree program permitting simultaneous study for the Juris Doctor and the Master of Business Administration degrees. The Villanova School of Business is one of the few business schools in the nation whose Master of Business Administration and Department of Accountancy program have been approved by the Association to Advance Collegiate Schools of Business. In the program, credit is given for certain courses by both the School of Law and the School of Business. Through this program, degrees may be completed in less time than it would take to obtain them separately.

=== Graduate Tax Program ===
The Graduate Tax Program is an interdisciplinary program led by Leslie M. Book conducted under the auspices of the Villanova University School of Law and Villanova's School of Business. The program has over 30 courses, which are also available to JD candidates, who are able to enroll in LL.M. courses as well as participate in the joint JD/LL.M. program. Business students participating in the Graduate Tax Program may earn a Master of Science in Taxation (MST) degree.

== Moorad Center for the Study of Sports Law ==
The Jeffrey S. Moorad Center for the Study of Sports Law was created in 2012, and was funded by a $5 million donation from San Diego Padres vice chairman and CEO Jeffrey S. Moorad (a 1981 graduate of the law school). The Center prepares students for careers in sports-related fields. It is one of only a few in the United States dedicated to the study of sports law, and it is run by director Andrew Brandt, a lawyer, former NFL team executive, and ESPN commentator.

== Rankings and reputation ==
The 2024-25 edition of U.S. News & World Report's "Best Graduate Schools" ranked Villanova Law at 48th (tied) in the country overall.

The 2022 edition of Above the Law's Top 50 Law Schools ranked Villanova as the 35th best law school in the country.

== Class statistics ==
Fall 2021 entering class profile:

- Total number of applicants: 2,972
- Admit rate: 17.8%
- Total enrolled: 219
- In-state: 45%
- Out-of-state: 55%
- Students of color: 24%
- Undergraduate schools represented: 125

GPA:

- Median GPA: 3.70
- 25th percentile GPA: 3.51
- 75th percentile GPA: 3.83

LSAT:

- Median LSAT: 162
- 25th percentile LSAT: 157
- 75th percentile LSAT: 164

== Notable faculty ==
- Mark C. Alexander
- Michelle Anderson (born 1967), President of Brooklyn College, and scholar on rape law
- J. Richard Harvey
- Edmund V. Ludwig
- John F. Murphy, emeritus law professor
- Gerald Pappert, adjunct professor and federal judge on the United States District Court for the Eastern District of Pennsylvania
- Joel Slomsky, adjunct professor and federal judge on the United States District Court for the Eastern District of Pennsylvania

== Notable alumni ==
- Frederick Anton III (law class of 1958), president and CEO of the Pennsylvania Manufactures Association and the Pennsylvania Manufactures Insurance Company
- Richard Arcara (law class of 1965), judge, United States District Court for the Western District of New York (1988–present; Chief Judge, 2003–2010)
- Adrienne Arsht, philanthropist and banking executive (namesake of the Adrienne Arsht Center for the Performing Arts)
- Kelly Ayotte (law class of 1993), former Republican United States senator from New Hampshire (2011–2017); formerly New Hampshire Attorney General (2004–2009)
- Lewis R. Carluzzo (law class of 1974), special trial judge of the United States Tax Court
- J. Scot Chadwick (law class of 1978), former Republican member of the Pennsylvania House of Representatives (1985–2000)
- Mary Little Cooper (law class of 1972), United States district judge on the United States District Court for the District of New Jersey (1992–present); formerly VP and General Counsel, Prudential Property and Casualty Insurance, Holmdel (1990–1992); Commissioner, New Jersey Department of Banking (1984–1990)
- Ryan Costello, former Chester County Commissioner and former member of the United States House of Representatives
- Craig Dally (law class of 1988), current judge for the 3rd District of the Northampton County Court of Common Pleas (2010–present); former member of the Pennsylvania House of Representatives for the 138th District (1996–2010)
- Joseph T. Doyle, Pennsylvania State Representative for the 163rd district (1971–1978)
- Bishop Michael Fitzgerald, auxiliary bishop of the Archdiocese of Philadelphia
- Dave Frankel, Philadelphia TV anchor
- Jacob Frey, former member of the Minneapolis City Council (2014–2018), Mayor of Minneapolis (2018–present)
- Charlie Gerow, Republican political strategist
- David F. Girard-diCarlo (law class of 1973), attorney and United States Ambassador to Austria (2008–2009); former Managing Partner and Chairman of Blank Rome
- William J. Green, III, former member of the United States House of Representatives (1964–1977); Mayor of Philadelphia (1980–1984)
- N. Christopher Griffiths, associate justice of the Delaware Supreme Court
- Joseph Hare, executive and retired rear admiral, US Navy
- Mark A. Kearney, United States district judge, United States District Court for the Eastern District of Pennsylvania (2014–present)
- Joanna McClinton, Pennsylvania House Speaker
- Matthew F. McHugh, former member of the United States House of Representatives
- Jeff Moorad, owner, San Diego Padres
- Ed Rendell, former governor of Pennsylvania (2003–2011); former Mayor of Philadelphia (1992–1999)
- Marjorie Rendell, federal judge on the United States Court of Appeals for the Third Circuit (1997–present); former judge for the United States District Court for the Eastern District of Pennsylvania
- Matthew J. Ryan, former Speaker of the Pennsylvania House of Representatives
- William H. Ryan, Jr., Acting Attorney General of Pennsylvania (2011); formerly District Attorney of Delaware County (1988–1996)
- Jennifer Santiago (law class of 1987), Emmy Award-winning journalist
- Collins J. Seitz, Jr., chief justice of the Delaware Supreme Court
- Donald Snyder (law class of 1982), member of the Pennsylvania House of Representatives (1981–2000; Majority Whip 1997–2000)
- Michael J. Stack III (law class of 1992), 33rd and former lieutenant governor of Pennsylvania
- Thomas J. Stapleton (law class of 1972), Pennsylvania State Representative for the 165th district (1975–1978)
- Gerald R. Stockman (law class of 1959), noted fair housing advocate and former New Jersey state senator (1982–1992)
- Michael Testa, New Jersey State Senator for the 1st Legislative district (2019–present)
- Richard Trumka, president of the AFL–CIO and former president of the United Mine Workers of America
- John Waldron, criminal defense lawyer
- David Worby, trial lawyer known for advocacy on behalf of 9/11 workers

=== Placement ===
According to Villanova's official 2014 ABA-required disclosures, 70% of the Class of 2014 obtained full-time, long-term, JD-required employment nine months after graduation, excluding solo practitioners.

ABA employment summary for 2014 graduates
Employment status	Percentage
Employed – Bar passage required	70%
Employed – J.D. advantage	17%
Employed – Professional position	1%
Employed – Non-professional position	1%
Employed – Undeterminable	0%
Pursuing graduate degree full time	1%
Unemployed – Start date deferred	1%
Unemployed – Not seeking	1%
Unemployed – Seeking	8%
Employment status unknown	0%
Total of 220 graduates

=== Pro bono programs ===
Pro bono programs, such as the clinics and other projects, provide students with the opportunity to serve the disadvantaged while developing skills and positive relationships with practicing attorneys.

==== Lawyering Together ====
Villanova Law's student body has the opportunity to participate in the "Lawyering Together" program. Through the program, law students are matched with volunteer attorneys who assist clients referred through Philadelphia pro bono organizations. The referring organizations include Senior Law Center, Philadelphia Volunteers for the Indigent Program (VIP) and the Support Center for Child Advocates.
