= Mary Little Cooper =

American judge (born 1946)

Senior Judge of the United States District Court for the District of New Jersey
- Incumbent
- Assumed office August 31, 2011

Judge of the United States District Court for the District of New Jersey
- In office March 2, 1992 – August 31, 2011
- Appointed by: George H. W. Bush
- Preceded by: Seat established by 104 Stat. 5089
- Succeeded by: Michael A. Shipp

Commissioner of the New Jersey Department of Banking
- In office July 11, 1984 – January 16, 1990
- Governor: Thomas Kean
- Preceded by: Dominick A. Mazzagetti
- Succeeded by: Robert M. Jaworski

Personal details
- Born: August 13, 1946 (age 79) Fond du Lac, Wisconsin, U.S.
- Education: Bryn Mawr College (AB); Villanova University (JD)

Mary Little Cooper (born August 13, 1946) is an inactive senior United States district judge of the United States District Court for the District of New Jersey.

== Education and career ==
Cooper was born in Fond du Lac, Wisconsin. She received an Artium Baccalaureus degree from Bryn Mawr College in 1968 and a Juris Doctor from Villanova University School of Law in 1972. She was in private practice in Newark, New Jersey from 1972 to 1984. She was a Commissioner, New Jersey Department of Banking in Trenton, New Jersey from 1984 to 1990, and was then vice-president and general counsel for Prudential Property and Casualty Insurance in Holmdel, New Jersey, from 1990 to 1992.

=== Federal judicial service ===
On July 26, 1991, Cooper was nominated by President George H. W. Bush to a new seat on the United States District Court for the District of New Jersey created by 104 Stat. 5089. She was confirmed by the United States Senate on February 27, 1992, and received her commission on March 2, 1992. She assumed senior status on August 31, 2011. She was confirmed and served on the court until February 26, 1998, under the name of Mary Little Parell.

== Sources ==
Legal offices
Preceded by Seat established by 104 Stat. 5089	Judge of the United States District Court for the District of New Jersey; 1992–2011	Succeeded by Michael A. Shipp
