= Tyler Folsom =

American engineer and academic

- Born: November 10, 1948 (age 77); Seattle Washington, U.S.
- Occupations: Engineer, academic, and researcher
- Employer: Sperry Univac (1973–1976)
- Parents: Tyler Cleveland Folsom Jr. (father); Phyllis Emily Greer Folsom (mother)

Tyler Cleveland Folsom III (born November 10, 1948) is an American engineer, academic, and researcher known for his work on autonomous vehicles, micromobility, and sustainable urban transportation systems. He is an affiliate professor in Computing and Software Systems and Electrical Engineering at the University of Washington Bothell, where he leads projects integrating automation and lightweight electric vehicles.

== Early life and education ==
Folsom was born in Seattle Washington, to Tyler Cleveland Folsom Jr. and Phyllis Emily Greer Folsom. He earned a Bachelor of Science in mathematics from Villanova University in 1970 and a Master of Arts in mathematics from the University of Maryland in 1972. Folsom later pursued engineering, completing both a Master of Science (1980) and a Doctor of Philosophy (1994) in Electrical Engineering at the University of Washington.

== Academic and professional career ==
Folsom started working at Sperry Univac from 1973 to 1976, where he worked on real-time operations control systems for two unmanned NASA spacecraft programs, the Orbiting Solar Observatory and Atmosphere Explorer, at the Goddard Space Flight Center.

Folsom transitioned into full-time academia in 2000, joining DigiPen Institute of Technology in Redmond, Washington. He taught there until 2006 and achieved the rank of full professor.

In 2004, he served as a visiting professor at Northwest University in Xi’an, China.

In 2013, he joined the University of Washington Bothell as an affiliate professor in the School of Science, Technology, Engineering & Mathematics (STEM).

At UW Bothell, Folsom directs student teams in the development of autonomous electric tricycles, vehicles that combine aspects of micromobility and automation. His project began in his garage and grew into a multi-year research and development effort supported by an Amazon Catalyst Grant of $75,000 in 2016.

== Research ==
Folsom's work centers on the convergence of micromobility, vehicle automation, and personal rapid transit, with the goal of creating environmentally sustainable transportation options. Through the Elcano Project and its associated repositories on GitHub, he promotes open-source collaboration on autonomous vehicle design.

His research emphasizes ultra-low energy consumption, seeking to achieve the equivalent of 1,000 to 2,000 miles per gallon of gasoline through lightweight design and low-speed operation.

He has presented his ideas at international conferences including IEEE SusTech (2024), Mobility Innovation Week Japan (Nagoya, 2024), and EAI Future Transport 2025.

Folsom co-founded Cogneta Inc., a company dedicated to commercializing automated vehicle technology, and established Micro-AV Social Purpose Corporation, focused on developing small autonomous transport solutions for urban areas.

Folsom is the author of Goddess at the Helm: Technology Taking Us Where Activists Wanted (2017), a book examining the social and ethical implications of technological progress.

== Selected publications ==
- Folsom, T.C.; Pinter, R.B. (1998). "Primitive features by steering, quadrature, and scale". IEEE Transactions on Pattern Analysis and Machine Intelligence. 20 (11): 1161–1173. Bibcode:1998ITPAM..20.1161F. doi:10.1109/34.730552. ISSN 0162-8828.
- Folsom, Tyler C.; Bondurant, Phillip D. (1999-10-06). "Non-Contact Internal Thread Inspection". SAE Technical Paper. SAE Technical Paper Series. 1 1999-01-3434. doi:10.4271/1999-01-3434.
- Folsom, Tyler (2012). "Energy and Autonomous Urban Land Vehicles". IEEE Technology and Society Magazine. 31 (2): 28–38. Bibcode:2012ITSMg..31b..28F. doi:10.1109/MTS.2012.2196339. ISSN 0278-0097.
- Folsom, Tyler C.; Cotter, Rob (2017). "Automation of ultra-light vehicles". 2017 IEEE Conference on Technologies for Sustainability (SusTech). IEEE. pp. 1–6. doi:10.1109/SusTech.2017.8333514. ISBN 978-1-5386-0452-6.
- Socha, David; Folsom, Tyler C; Justice, Joe (2013), "Applying Agile Software Principles and Practices for Fast Automotive Development", in SAE-China; FISITA (eds.), Proceedings of the FISITA 2012 World Automotive Congress, Lecture Notes in Electrical Engineering, vol. 196, Berlin, Heidelberg: Springer Berlin Heidelberg, pp. 1033–1045, doi:10.1007/978-3-642-33738-3_8, ISBN 978-3-642-33737-6
- Folsom, Tyler C. (2011). "An Invitation to a New Transportation Mode". Proceedings(743) 16th IASTED International Conf. Robotics and Applications. ACTAPRESS. doi:10.2316/P.2011.743-022. ISBN 978-0-88986-874-8.
- Folsom, Tyler C. (2011). "Social ramifications of autonomous urban land vehicles". 2011 IEEE International Symposium on Technology and Society (ISTAS). pp. 1–6. doi:10.1109/ISTAS.2011.7160596. ISBN 978-1-4244-9149-0.
- Folsom, Tyler C. (2007). "Non-pixel Robot Stereo". 2007 IEEE Symposium on Computational Intelligence in Image and Signal Processing. pp. 7–12. doi:10.1109/CIISP.2007.369285. ISBN 978-1-4244-0707-1.
- Folsom, T.C.; Pinter, R.B. (1994). "An interpretation of image processing in striate cortex". Proceedings of IEEE International Conference on Systems, Man and Cybernetics. Vol. 1. pp. 280–285. doi:10.1109/ICSMC.1994.399851. ISBN 0-7803-2129-4.
- Folsom, T.C.; Pinter, R.B. (1992). "Computational efficiency of the Gabor transform". [1992] Proceedings of the IEEE-SP International Symposium on Time-Frequency and Time-Scale Analysis. pp. 399–402. doi:10.1109/TFTSA.1992.274133. ISBN 0-7803-0805-0.
