= J. Richard Harvey =

American tax accountant

- Scientific career
- Fields: Accounting
- Institutions: Villanova University School of Law Bucknell University The College of New Jersey

J. Richard Harvey is Distinguished Professor of Practice at Villanova University School of Law and Graduate Tax Program. He joined the faculty in 2010, and previously served as professor at Bucknell University and The College of New Jersey. He is a frequent speaker quoted in the press, and has delivered speeches to the Canadian Tax Foundation, Multistate Tax Commission, American Bar Association, Tax Executive Institute, Wall Street Tax Association, and the Institute for International Bankers. He has also testified before the United States Congress on the international tax planning done by Apple, Inc. and other multinational companies.

Harvey has served as a senior government official in the United States Treasury Department and the Internal Revenue Service (IRS) during the Ronald Reagan, George W. Bush, and the Barack Obama administrations. He was senior advisor to the IRS Commissioner, and also served as a liaison with the U.S. Treasury Department, Congressional staff, and the United States Department of Justice. He was involved in the IRS efforts to deal with off-shore tax evasion.

He was tax partner at PricewaterhouseCoopers, where as an expert in the financial accounting for income taxes he provided tax consulting advice to companies around the world.

From 1986 to 1988 he was a senior accountant at the U.S. Treasury Department and was involved in the negotiation and implementation of the 1986 Tax Reform Act.
