= Fairchild Corporation =

Successor to Fairchild Industries, Inc.

- Formerly: Fairchild Industries, Inc.
- Type: Public (defunct)
- Industry: Conglomerate
- Defunct: 2009 (Chapter 11 bankruptcy)
- Fate: Bankrupt
- Key people: Jeffrey Steiner (former CEO), Phillip Sassower (interim CEO)
- Divisions: Banner Aerospace, Fairchild Fasteners

The Fairchild Corporation is the successor corporation of Fairchild Industries, Inc. In March 2009, the company filed for Chapter 11 bankruptcy protection. Banner Aerospace was one of the company's major subsidiaries.

The last major Fairchild asset sold was Fairchild Fasteners, a Sherman Fairchild company, which was sold to industrial corporation Alcoa for US$657,000,000 on December 3, 2002. It was subsequently renamed Alcoa Fasteners. In the summer of 2006, the corporation sold a shopping mall they had built on the Republic Airport property of Fairchild Hiller for US$95,000,000.

Jeffrey Steiner was the company's CEO until his resignation in October 2008; he died a month later. As of February 2009, the firm has been delisted from the New York Stock Exchange; a number of executives had recently left the company's senior management team, including Steiner's son, Eric; and the firm was being run by interim chief executive Phillip Sassower, the head of a New York private equity firm that is Fairchild's largest shareholder.
