= Jeffrey Steiner =

American businessman (1937–2008)

Jeffrey Steiner (April 3, 1937, Vienna – November 1, 2008) was the chief executive officer of the Fairchild Corporation, the successor corporation of Fairchild Industries, Inc.

Steiner was born in Vienna, Austria. His family fled to Turkey during World War II, when Hitler's troops invaded Austria. He spoke French, English, Turkish, German, Italian, and Spanish. He became the leading executive of the Fairchild Corporation in 1985. He introduced Michael Milken of Drexel Burnham to many of the European banks which would become buyers of Drexel's junk bonds. In 2006 his compensation from Fairchild was halved, following a shareholder lawsuit alleging overpayment.

Steiner was a leader and contributor among the youth of the Jewish community. The New York Times called him a "globe-trotting takeover artist". The French government honored him for his contributions to the arts, naming him a Chevalier des Arts et des Lettres.

After a series of surgeries, six months in a wheelchair and more than a year of rehabilitation with his personal trainer and close friend Jakob Panotas, Steiner was able to walk again. He died in November 2008 of cancer, and was survived by five children (Eric, Natalia, Benjamin, Alexandra and Tama Tama, (first and second wife) and six grandchildren.
