= Ricaurte Vásquez Morales =

Panamanian economist

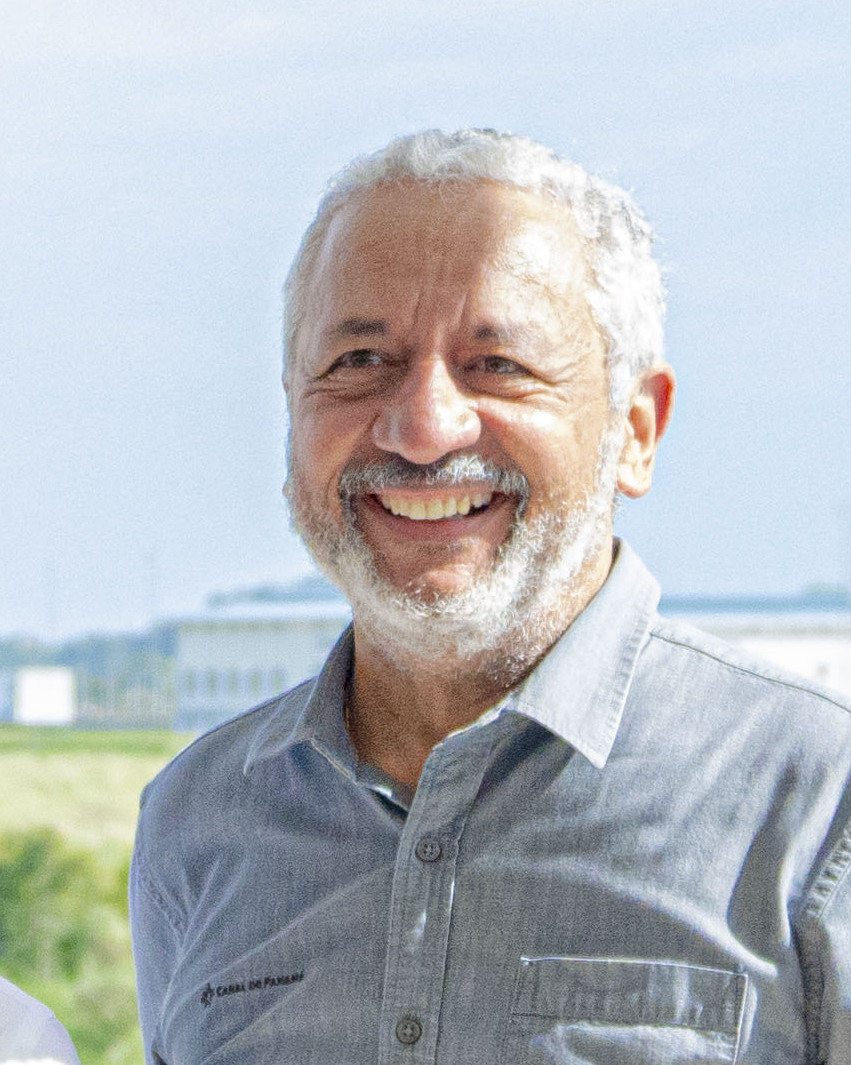

Administrator of Panama Canal
- Incumbent
- Assumed office 31 December 2019
- Preceded by: Jorge L. Quijano

Personal details
- Born: Ricaurte Vásquez Morales; 28 Octubre 1952 (71 years) Panama
- Education: Villanova University, RPI, NCSU

Ricaurte Vásquez Morales is a Panamanian economist, who currently serves as the administrator of the Panama Canal. He has held key roles in the Panamanian government, including Minister of Finance and Treasury, Minister of Economy and Finance, and Minister of Planning and Economic Policy. He was Panama Canal's first non-US Chief Financial Officer.

== Education ==
Vásquez earned his Doctor of Philosophy in Managerial Economics (1977-1979) from Rensselaer Polytechnic Institute, where he also obtained his Master of Science in Operations Research & Statistics (1976-1977). Prior to that, he completed his Master of Economics (1974-1975) at North Carolina State University and his Bachelor of Science in mathematics (1971-1973) at Villanova University.

== Career ==
Vásquez was appointed as the fourth administrator of the Panama Canal in 2019. This position was bestowed upon him by the Board of Directors of the Panama Canal, for a period of seven years. During his tenure, he has implemented significant changes to the Panama Canal's business model, including the introduction of a new pricing strategy that values water to ensure the sustainable management of resources.

Previously, he worked with General Electric for 7 years, where he oversaw lllGas-to-lllPower initiatives in Latin America. After retiring from General Electric in 2015, Vásquez had a tenure with SIGMA Management Advisors Corp.

From 1996 to 2000, he was director of finance of the Panama Canal. During this time, Vásquez played a pivotal role in facilitating the financial transition of the canal to the Panamanian administration in accordance with the 1977 Torrijos-Carter Treaties.

Subsequently, Vásquez advanced to the position of deputy administrator of the Panama Canal, serving from 2000 to 2004. He played a major role in the creation of the Panama Canal Master Plan 2006–2025, and later, from 2004 to 2006, he held the positions of Minister for Canal Affairs and chairman of the Panama Canal's board of directors. Throughout his career, Vásquez has been an economics and finance professor in both Panama and internationally.
