= Ambleny =

- Commune
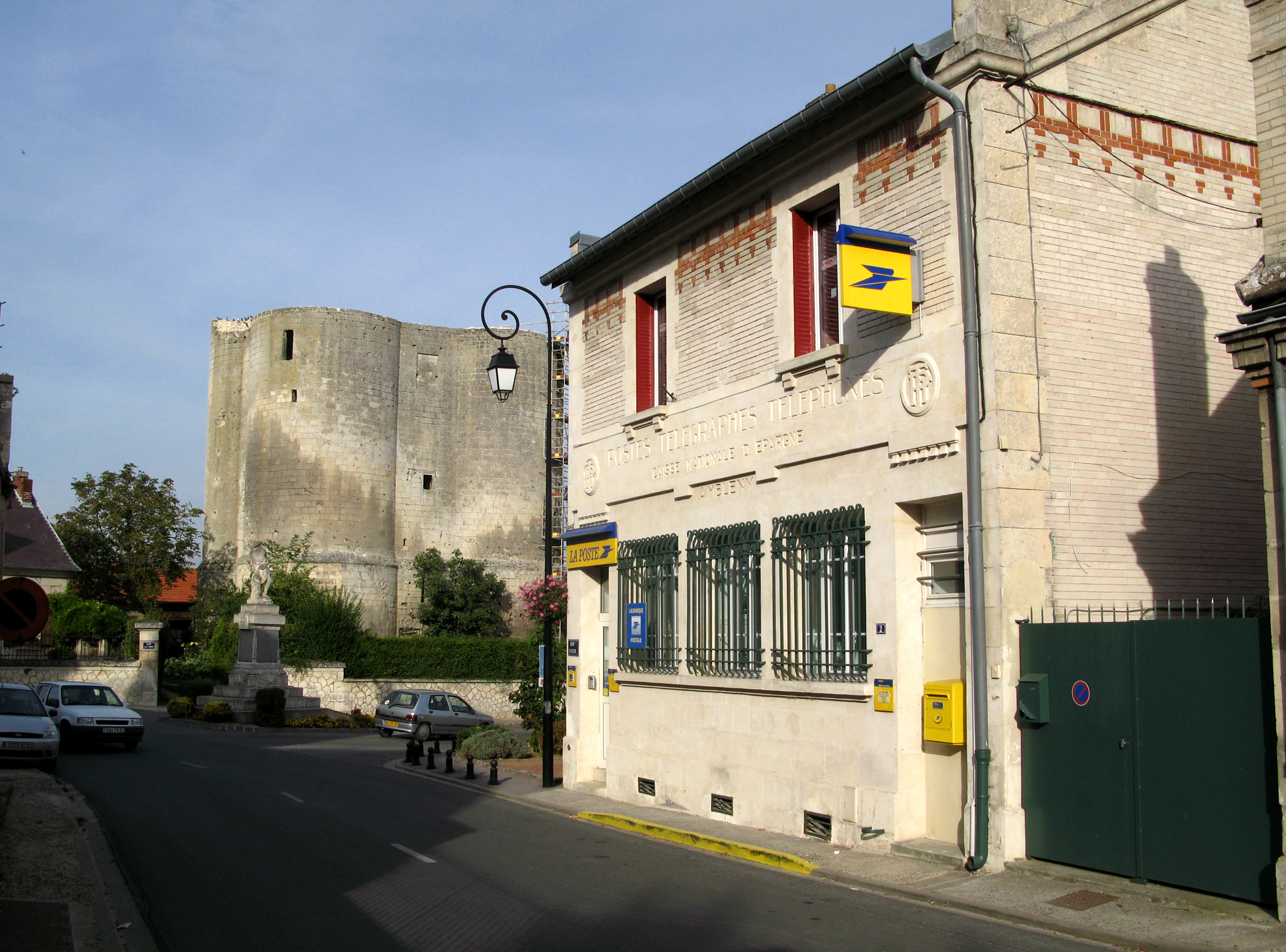
- Keep, war memorial, and post office

- Coat of arms
- Location of Ambleny
- Location within France Location within Hauts-de-France
- Coordinates: 49°22′51″N 3°11′04″E
- Country: France
- Region: Hauts-de-France
- Department: Aisne
- Arrondissement: Soissons
- Canton: Vic-sur-Aisne
- Intercommunality: Retz-en-Valois

Government
  - Mayor (2026–32): Philippe Lefevre
- Area^{1}: 17.32 km^{2} (6.69 sq mi)
- Elevation: 42 m (138 ft)
- Highest elevation: 153 m (502 ft)
- Lowest elevation: 38 m (125 ft)
- Population (2023): 1,205
  - Density: 69.57/km^{2} (180.2/sq mi)
- Time zone: UTC+01:00 (CET)
  - Summer (DST): UTC+02:00 (CEST)
- INSEE/Postal code: 02011 /02290
- ^{1} French Land Register data, which excludes lakes, ponds, glaciers > 1 km^{2} (0.386 sq mi or 247 acres) and river estuaries.

Ambleny (French pronunciation: [ɑ̃bləni]) is a commune in the department of Aisne in the Hauts-de-France region of northern France.

== Geography ==
Ambleny is located 8 km west of Soissons and 20 km east of Compiègne. Route National N31 passes through the northern part of the commune between those two cities with an exit to the D943 road which runs south to the town. The D17 road also runs from Fontenoy in the north to the town then continues south to Coeuvres-et-Valsery. The D1631 road also runs from the town southeast to join the D94 road at the southern tip of the commune. There are a number of hamlets in addition to the town: Le Soulier, Montaigu, Hignieres, and Le Rollet. The northern part of the commune is mixed forest and farmland while the southern portion is entirely farmland.

The Ru de Retz waterway forms part of the south-western boundary of the commune before flowing north through the town and continuing to the river Aisne just north of the commune as it flows west to join the Oise at Compiègne. The Quenneton stream joins the Ru de Retz south of the town at the commune boundary from the west.

== History ==
The former hamlets of Fosse-en-Haut and Fosse-en-Bas served as the starting point for several French units (including the 418th Infantry Regimanet) during the Second Battle of the Marne on 18 July 1918.

== Administration ==
List of Mayors of Ambleny

| From | To | Name | Party |
|---|---|---|---|
| 2001 | 2008 | Yvan Checler | DVG |
| 2008 | 2014 | Bernard de Re | PS |
| 2014 | 2020 | Jean-Claude Stolaric | |
| 2020 | 2026 | Jean-Marie Bouvier | |
| 2026 | incumbent | Philippe Lefevre | |

== Population ==
Historical population
| Year | Pop. | ±% p.a. |
|---|---|---|
| 1968 | 889 | — |
| 1975 | 844 | −0.74% |
| 1982 | 960 | +1.86% |
| 1990 | 1,119 | +1.93% |
| 1999 | 1,112 | −0.07% |
| 2007 | 1,146 | +0.38% |
| 2012 | 1,137 | −0.16% |
| 2017 | 1,155 | +0.31% |
| 2023 | 1,205 | +0.71% |
Source: INSEE

== Sites and monuments ==
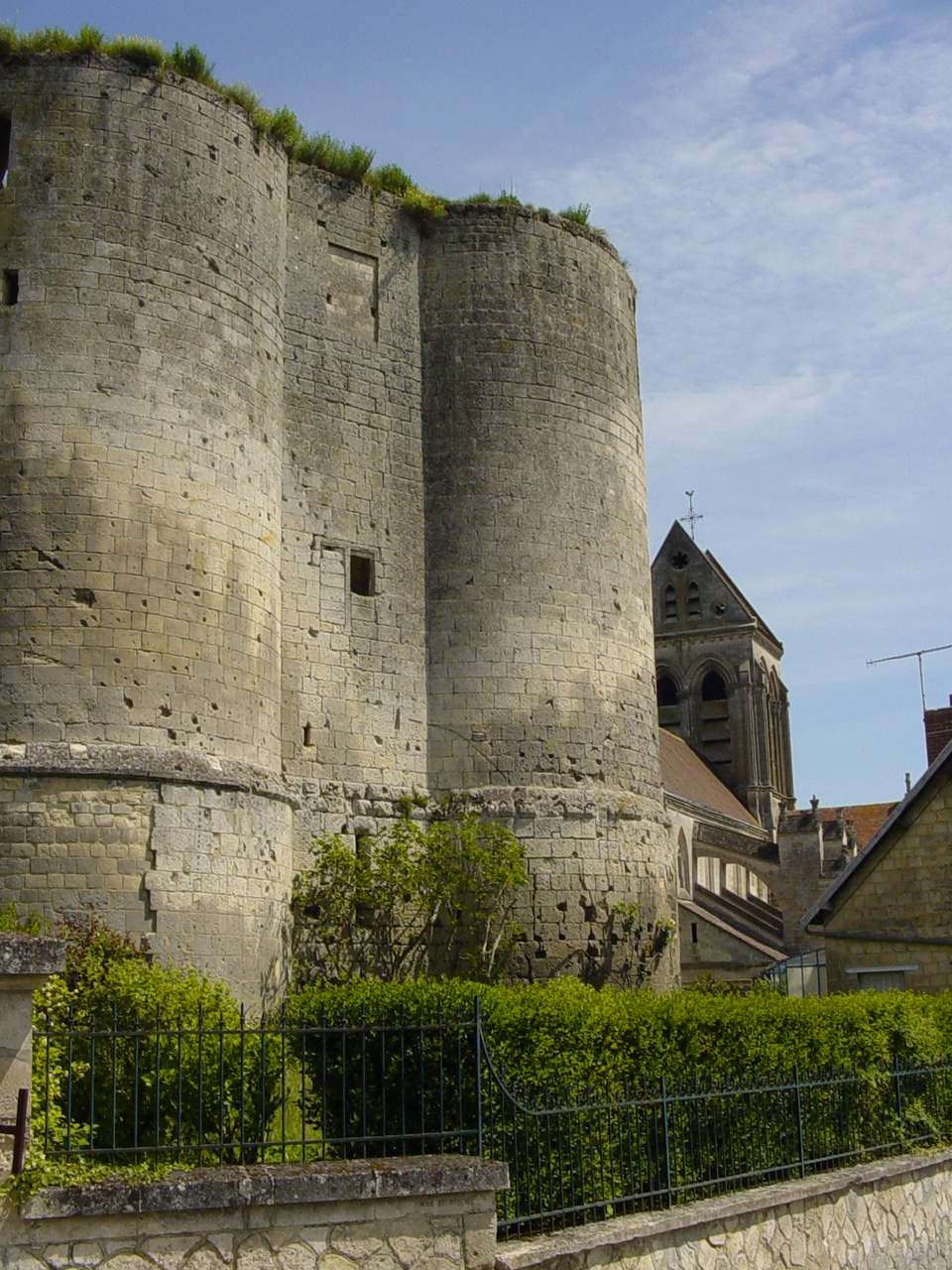
Ambleny Castle with the church in the background (2004)

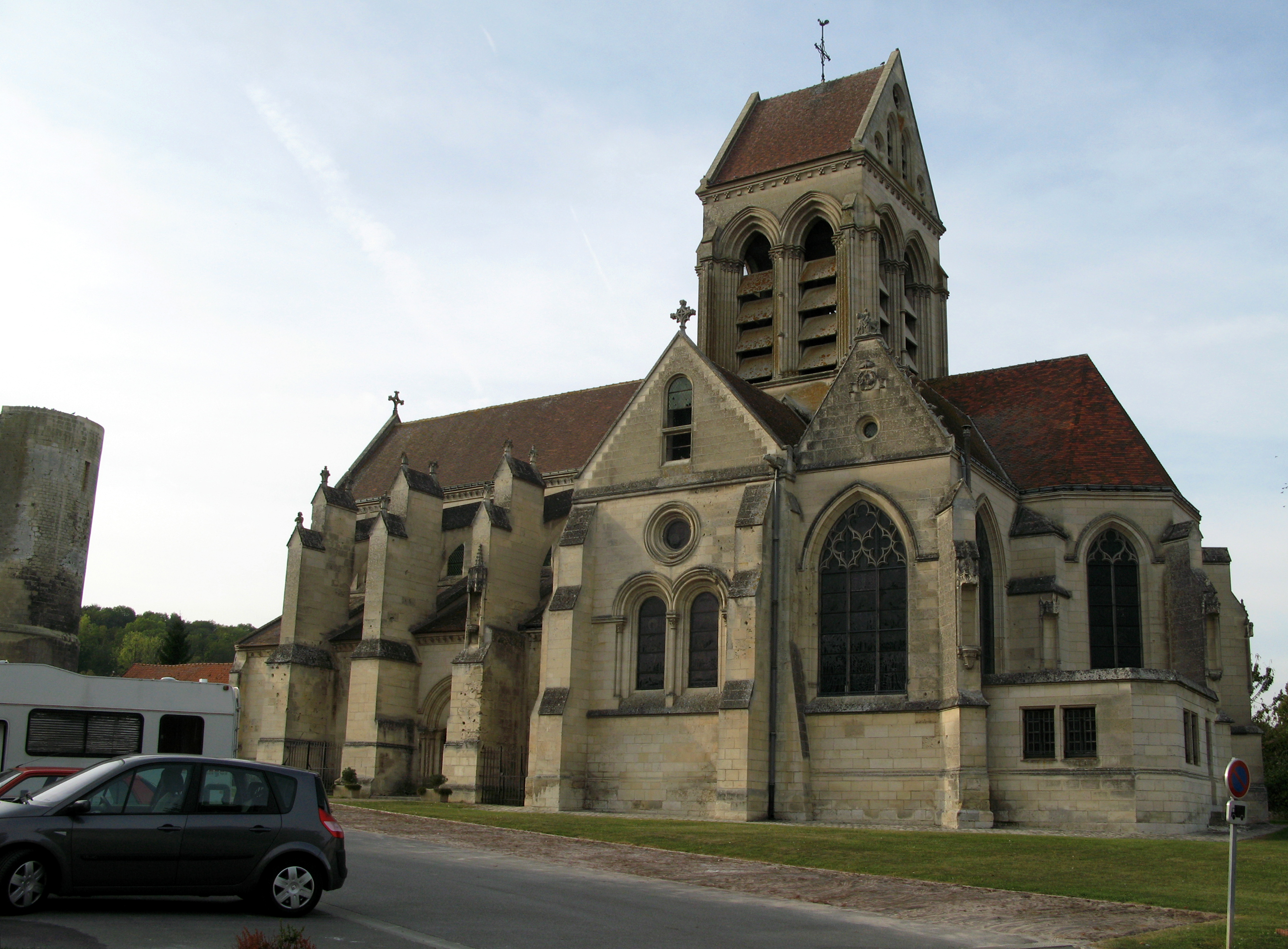
The Church of Saint-Martin

- The Keep of Ambleny (12th century) is registered as an historical monument.
- The Church of Saint Martin (12th century) is registered as an historical monument. The church contains several items that are registered as historical objects:
  - A Fresco: Vision of Saint Hubert (15th century)
  - The Funeral Plaque of Antoinette Rousin (1734)
  - The Funeral Plaque of the Priest Louis Brayer (1724)
  - A Statue: Saint Sebastian (16th century)
  - A Statue: Saint Paul (16th century)
  - A Statue: Saint Martin (16th century)
  - A Statue: Christ of Pity (16th century)
  - A Statue: Virgin of Sorrow (16th century)
  - A Baptismal font (18th century)
  - A Tombstone (14th century)
  - A Stained glass window (16th century)
- The Lavoir (Public Laundry) in Maubrun

== Notable people linked to the commune ==
- Pierre Antoine Poiteau, botanist and horticulturist

== See also ==
- Communes of the Aisne department
