= Joseph Hare =

United States admiral

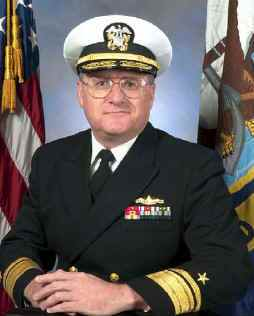
RADM Joseph C. Hare's Biography Picture

Rear Admiral Joseph C. Hare is a Pennsylvania native, a 1972 graduate of the Naval ROTC program of Villanova University, and a 1978 graduate of the Villanova University School of Law.

Following his training in naval communications and cryptography, he served as communications officer, electronic material officer, and cryptographic security officer in U.S. Atlantic Fleet destroyers Lowry (DD-770) and Corry (DD-817).

Afloat tours in the Naval Reserve have included deck watch officer in Emory S. Land (AS-39), weapons officer in Harold J. Ellison (DD-864), and selected reserve coordinator in Oliver Hazard Perry (FFG-7).

Shore billets have included executive officer of Shore Intermediate Maintenance Activity (SIMA) Philadelphia, Surface Group Four Squadron liaison officer, and plans officer of Naval Reserve Readiness Command Region Four.

Major staff billets have included assistant chief of staff to commander, Naval Base Philadelphia, and assistant deputy to commander, Iceland Defense Force.

Hare was promoted to flag rank in October 1996. His notable assignments in flag rank included serving as commander of Military Sealift Command Atlantic, commander of Military Sealift Command Europe, commander of Naval Reserve Readiness Command Region Four, deputy commander of Naval Surface Force, U.S. Atlantic Fleet, and deputy for Training Integration at Naval Education and Training Command. Hare retired on March 1, 2005.

In his civilian employment, Hare was the Vice President for Shipyard Operations of Rhoads Industries, Inc. a defense industry contractor at the Philadelphia Navy Yard, as well as a private consultant in legal and defense-industry-related matters. He has formerly served as the chief operating officer and general counsel of Granary Associates, Inc., a health-care-facility design and development company in Philadelphia, and he has formerly served as a partner in the law firm of Weir & Partners, as the CEO of a 200-bed acute care hospital, as general counsel of a hospital system, and as treasurer and general counsel of a member firm of the Philadelphia Stock Exchange. Hare has served as a member of the boards of various professional organizations, including the Maritime Exchange of the Delaware River and Bay, Philadelphia Council of the Navy League of the United States, the Philadelphia Chapter of the Surface Navy Association, the USO Of Pennsylvania and South Jersey, and the Armed Services Council of the Union League of Philadelphia.

Hare resides in the suburbs of Philadelphia.

== Awards and decorations ==
Hare has been the recipient of the Distinguished Service Medal, the Legion of Merit (three awards), the Meritorious Service Medal (two awards), the Navy Commendation Medal (three awards), and various other service medals and ribbons.

Navy Distinguished Service Medal
Legion of Merit with three golden award stars
Meritorious Service Medal with two award stars
