= King Street Capital Management =

New York investment management firm

King Street Capital Management, L.P.
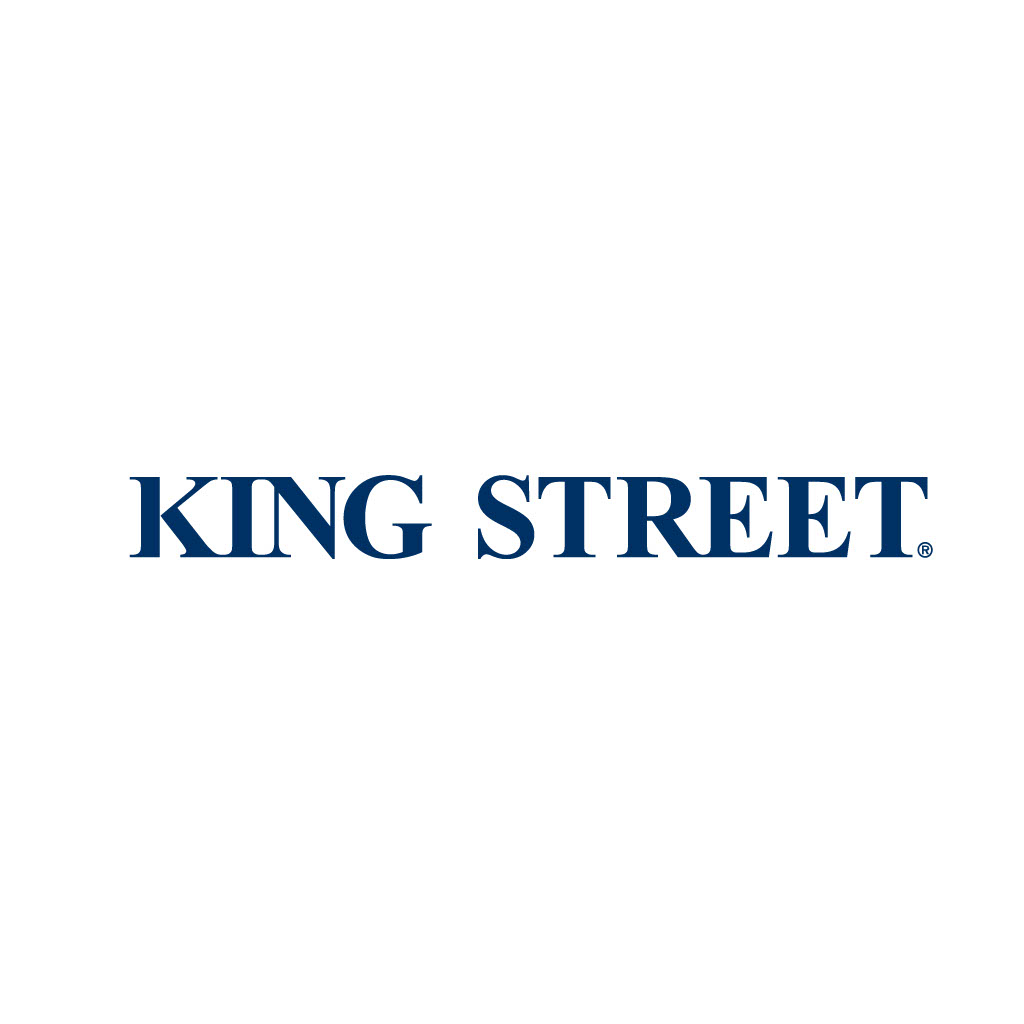
- Company type: Limited Partnership
- Industry: Investment management
- Founded: 1995; 31 years ago
- Founders: Brian J. Higgins and Francis Biondi Jr
- Headquarters: New York, New York, U.S.
- Area served: Worldwide
- AUM: US$ 26 billion (2024)
- Number of employees: 250 (2024)
- Website: www.kingstreet.com

King Street Capital Management is an American investment management company founded in 1995 by Brian J. Higgins and Francis Biondi Jr. As of 2024, King Street Capital Management managed approximately $26 billion of assets. The firm employs approximately 250 employees and operates offices in New York, London, Singapore, Charlottesville, Virginia, Dublin, Tokyo, Dubai and Palo Alto.

The company investments include public equity and fixed income markets globally with a focus in special situations credit, equity, bonds, and foreign exchange. Significant investments included Dish Network, PG&E, and Allergan.

== History ==
King Street Capital Management was founded in 1995 and initially focused on distressed debt. Over the following years the firm invested in credit markets, including in performing, stressed, distressed, corporate, structured, asset-backed credit, and real estate.

In 2017, the firm launched Rockford Tower, a collateralized-loan obligations business.

In 2022, the firm launched a dedicated strategy investing in private credit.
