= Bolger =

Bolger may refer to:

== People ==
- Andrew Keenan-Bolger (born 1985), American actor
- Barnaby Bolger, Anglican priest
- Ben Bolger (born 1989), English rugby league footballer
- Benjamin Bolger (born 1975), second most credentialed person in modern history
- Bill Bolger (1931–2009), American basketball player
- Billy Bolger (1910–1977), Australian golfer
- Cian Bolger (born 1992), Irish footballer
- Celia Keenan-Bolger (born 1978), American actress and singer
- Daniel P. Bolger (born 1957), U.S. Army Lieutenant General and author
- David Bolger (born 1968), Irish choreographer
- Deirdre Bolger (born 1938), Irish politician
- Dermot Bolger (born 1959), Irish novelist, playwright and poet
- Emma Bolger (born 1996), Irish actress
- Jase Bolger (born 1971), American politician
- Jim Bolger (1935–2025), New Zealand politician, Prime Minister of New Zealand
- Jim Bolger (baseball) (1932–2020), American baseball outfielder
- Jim Bolger (racehorse trainer) (born 1941), Irish racehorse trainer
- Joel Bolger (born 1955), American lawyer
- John A. Bolger, Jr. (1908–1990), American sound engineer
- John Michael Bolger (born 1957), American actor
- Jordan Bolger (born 1994), Afro-British actor
- Kevin Bolger (born 1993), American cross-country skier
- Laurie Bolger (born 1989), English poet, stand-up and presenter
- Maggie Keenan-Bolger (born 1983), American actress
- Marguerite Bolger, Irish judge
- Martin Bolger (1906–1991), Australian rules footballer
- Merv Bolger (1919–1993), Australian rules footballer
- Nicola Bolger (born 1993), Australian football player
- Patrick Bolger (1948–2024), Canadian wrestler and judoka
- Phil Bolger (1927–2009), American naval architect
- Ray Bolger (1904–1987), American entertainer
- Robert J. Bolger (1922–2007), American businessman
- Sarah Bolger (born 1991), Irish actress
- Thomas Bolger (Irish politician) (1856–1938), Irish politician
- Thomas A. Bolger (1887–1953), American politician
- Thomas Bolger (wrestler) (1904–1995), Australian wrestler
- William F. Bolger (1923–1989), 65th Postmaster General of the United States

== Fictional characters ==
- James Bolger, character in 11/11/11

== Places ==
- Bolger, Ontario

== See also ==
- Bulger (disambiguation)
