= Bulger =

Bulger may refer to:

== People ==
- Andrew Bulger (1789–1858), British soldier and colonial administrator
- Charles W. Bulger (1851–1922), American architect
- Chet Bulger (1917–2009), American football player
- Daniel Delany Bulger (1865–1930), Irish athlete
- James Bulger (1990–1993), Murder victim
- Jason Bulger (born 1978), American baseball pitcher
- Jay Bulger (born1982), American film director and writer
- Lawrence Bulger (1870–1928), Irish rugby union player, athlete and doctor
- Marc Bulger (born 1977), former American football quarterback
- Michael Joseph Bulger (1867–1938), Irish rugby player, doctor, and Olympic official
- Paul G. Bulger (1913–2000), third president of Buffalo State College (1959–1967)
- Peggy Bulger, American folklorist and the director of the American Folklife Center at the Library of Congress
- Whitey Bulger (born James Joseph Bulger Jr., 1929–2018), former American organized crime figure from Boston, Massachusetts (brother of William M. Bulger)
- William M. Bulger (born 1934), American politician, lawyer, and educator (brother of Whitey Bulger)

== Places ==
=== Albania ===
- Bulgër, a village in the administrative unit of Rubik, Albania

=== United States ===
- Bulgers, Alabama, an unincorporated community in Tallapoosa County, Alabama
- Bulger, Pennsylvania, an unincorporated community in Smith Township, Washington County, Pennsylvania
- Bulger, West Virginia, an unincorporated community in Lincoln County, West Virginia

== See also ==
- Bolger (disambiguation)
- Boulger
- Bulgur
