= The Moth Poetry Prize =

Irish prize for unpublished poems

The Moth Poetry Prize is a prize given for single unpublished poems. Founded in 2011 by Irish magazine The Moth, it offers a prize fund of €11,000.

== Judging and eligibility ==
The competition is open to any candidate, as long as their poems are previously unpublished. Each year the prize attracts thousands of entries from new and established poets from over 50 countries.

The prize is judged anonymously by a single poet.

Past judges include Hannah Sullivan (2024), Nobel Laureate Louise Glück (2023), Warsan Shire (2022), Jacob Polley (2019), Claudia Rankine, Marie Howe, Deborah Landau, Daljit Nagra, Leontia Flynn, Billy Collins, and Nick Laird.

The competition closes annually on 31 December. A shortlist of four candidates is announced in the spring, alongside eight commended poems. The shortlisted poems are published in The Irish Times online. The overall winner (€6,000) is announced at a special, online, award ceremony.

== Winners ==
Award recipients
Year	Poet	Work	Result	Ref.
2011	Paul McMahon	Bourdon	1st place	
2011	Sarah Clancy	I Crept Out	2nd place	
2011	Lydia Macpherson	The Fisherman	3rd place	
2012	Tom Moore	The Astronaut	1st place	
2012	Kita Shantiris	Oranges	2nd place	
2012	Paula Cunningham	Fathom	3rd place	
2013	Ann Gray	My Blue Hen	1st place	
2013	Elena Tomorowitz	Elegy	2nd place	
2013	Jo Bell	Rations	3rd place	
2014	Lisa Bickmore	Eidolon	1st place	
2014	Jude Nutter	Disco Jesus and the Wavering Virgins in Berlin, 2011	Shortlist	
2014	Kathryn Simmonds	Fantasia on a Theme by Elvis	Shortlist	
2014	Matt Hohner	Saratoga Passage, August 2014	Shortlist	
2015	Abigail Parry	Arterial	1st place	
2015	David McLoughlin	Tom Crean Sings Sean-nos at the Tiller on the Southern Ocean	Shortlist	
2015	James Leader	Phoebe and the Troopship	Shortlist	
2015	Natalya Anderson	Dance Therapy	Shortlist	
2016	Lee Sharkey	Letter to Al	1st place	
2016	C. Mikal Oness	On the Sprocket Side of the Hay Rake	Shortlist	
2016	Greg Geis	Marriage	Shortlist	
2016	Katie Hale	You’re in my Blood like Holy Wine	Shortlist	
2017	Natalya Anderson	A Gun in the House	1st place	
2017	Audrey Molloy	Fortune Reshuffled, Reshuffled	Shortlist	
2017	Cheryl Moskowitz	Shirtless	Shortlist	
2017	Teresa Ott	In what way are forest black or white. We saw them blue. With forget-me-nots.	Shortlist	
2018	Jude Nutter	Dead Drift	1st place	
2018	David Stavanger	Octonaut	Shortlist	
2018	Margaret Park Haas	Sestina	Shortlist	
2018	Steven Heighton	Christmas Work Detail, Samos	Shortlist	
2019	Damen O’Brien	The Nave	1st place	
2019	Claudia Daventry	I do not appear in photos	Shortlist	
2019	Kate Potts	A Telephone Conversation with my Sister/Footnotes	Shortlist	
2019	Nicholas Ruddock	Genetic Memory	Shortlist	
2020	Michael Lavers	Chaos Soliloquy	1st place	
2020	Abigail Parry	In the dream of the cold restaurant	Shortlist	
2020	Rowland Bagnall	A Week in March	Shortlist	
2020	Suzanne Cleary	For the Poet Who Writes to Me While Standing in Line at CVS, Waiting for his Mothers Prescription	Shortlist	
2021	Aniqah Choudhri	The Unloving Ground	1st place	
2021	Heather Treseler	Chase Street	Shortlist	
2021	Mark Fiddes	Hotel Petroleum	Shortlist	
2021	Roz Goddard	Small Moon Curve	Shortlist	
2022	Laurie Bolger	Parkland Walk	1st place	
2022	J. P. Grasser	Last Year in Baltimore	Shortlist	
2022	Kit Fan	Workers Leaving the Lumière Factory	Shortlist	
2022	Tom Laichas	Travel Advisory	Shortlist	
2023	Lance Larsen	Things I'm Against	1st place	
2023	Catherine Ann Cullen	Pencilling the Dates	Shortlist	
2023	Craig van Rooyen	Extinction Picnic	Shortlist	
2023	Jade Angeles Fitton	And Other Mirages	Shortlist	
