= Edey & Duff =

Defunct American sailboat manufacturer

Edey & Duff was a Massachusetts-based yacht building company known for creating fiberglass versions of traditional designs. The company was founded in 1968 by Mait Edey and Peter Duff. Specializing in sailboat manufacturing, the company manufacturing such notable designs the Dovekie 21, the Stone Horse 23, and the Stuart Knockabout. In addition to their sailboat line, Edey & Duff also manufactured powerboats. However, after 42 years of operation, Edey & Duff ceased its operations in 2010.
