= Stuart Knockabout =

Sailboat class

- SK

Development
- Designer: L. Francis Herreshoff
- Location: United States
- Year: 1932
- No. built: 76
- Builders: Edey & Duff/Ballentines's Boat Shop; Stuart Knockabout LLC
- Role: Day sailer
- Name: Stuart Knockabout

Boat
- Displacement: 4,000 lb (1,814 kg)
- Draft: 5.50 ft (1.68 m) with centerboard down

Hull
- Type: monohull
- Construction: Wood or fiberglass
- LOA: 28.00 ft (8.53 m)
- LWL: 22.83 ft (6.96 m)
- Beam: 6.92 ft (2.11 m)
- Engine: Torqeedo 1003C 1.5 hp (1 kW) electric engine

Hull appendages
- Keel: modified long keel and centerboard
- Ballast: 2,400 lb (1,089 kg)
- Rudder: keel-mounted rudder

Rig
- Rig type: Bermuda rig
- I foretriangle height: 24.00 ft (7.32 m)
- J foretriangle base: 8.75 ft (2.67 m)
- P mainsail luff: 28.60 ft (8.72 m)
- E mainsail foot: 13.00 ft (3.96 m)

Sails
- Sailplan: fractional rigged sloop
- Mainsail area: 185.90 sq ft (17.271 m^{2})
- Jib/genoa area: 105.00 sq ft (9.755 m^{2})
- Total sail area: 290.90 sq ft (27.025 m^{2})

Racing
- PHRF: 185

The Stuart Knockabout is an American trailerable sailboat that was designed as a daysailer, by L. Francis Herreshoff and first built in 1932. The boat is L.F. Herreshoff design number 53.

The boat was a commission for a single boat to be designed and built for Willoughby Stuart in 1932. Stuart was seeking a large daysailer with a shallow draft that had ease of handling, capacity and comfort. The boat only entered production in 1989, some 17 years after the designer's death.

== Production ==
The design was initially just a single boat in 1932, with a few more completed from wood. It was put into production in 1989, with the hulls being built by Edey & Duff in Mattapoisett, Massachusetts, United States and the boats finished by Ballentines's Boat Shop in Cataumet, Massachusetts. Edey & Duff ceased operations in 2010 when General Manager Dave Devignon died and Steve Ballentine and his daughter Amy Ballentine Stevens bought the molds and rights to the design. They formed Stuart Knockabout LLC as a subsidiary of Ballentine's Boat Shop and continue to produce the boat. A total of 16 boats had been completed by 1994 and 76 by 2020.

== Design ==
The Stuart Knockabout is a recreational keelboat, initially built of wood and later adapted for fiberglass over an Airex foam core construction by Bill Harding of Edey & Duff. It has a fractional sloop rig, with a boom-mounted, self-tending jib. The hull has a spooned, raked stem; a raised counter, angled transom; a keel-mounted rudder controlled by a tiller and a fixed modified long keel, with a cutaway forefoot and a retractable, solid PVC centerboard, with raising gear with a 2:1 mechanical advantage. It displaces 4,000 lb (1,814 kg) and carries 2,400 lb (1,089 kg) of lead ballast, all in the long keel.

The boat has a draft of 5.50 ft (1.68 m) with the centerboard extended and 2.75 ft (0.84 m) with it retracted, allowing operation in shallow water.

The boat may be optionally fitted with a German Torqeedo Travel 1003C electric engine of 1.5 hp (1 kW) or the 3.0 hp (2 kW) Torqeedo Cruise 2.0 Pod Drive, mounted on a side bracket for docking and manoeuvring.

For sailing the design has a 4:1 mainsheet. It is equipped with standard equipment that includes sails, navigation lights, a fixed bilge pump, two life jackets and an oar. Factory options include teak seats, a boat trailer for road transport, a spinnaker, genoa, a second oar, a side-mounted outboard motor bracket and a swimming ladder.

The design has a PHRF racing average handicap of 185.

== Operational history ==
In a 1994 review Richard Sherwood wrote, "while there are not too many Knockabouts, the design warrants inclusion. The original boats were wood, and while now in fiberglass, the classic wood lines are retained ... The cockpit is over 9 feet long, has bench seats, and the coaming is a backrest. Forward, shelves and a decked-over space provide storage for sails. In addition, there is a stern locker ... As with many Herreshoff designs, the Knockabout is shallow draft."

Rob Peake wrote a review for Classic Boat magazine, in which he said, "the 28ft Knockabout carries 265 square foot of sail and is a common step-up for the Herreshoff 12½ sailor, also for those downsizing from a yacht. You get plenty of space, enough for a family, an easy-to-handle rig and judging by her performance in the perfect evening breeze we’re blessed with, a stable hull (a light, foam-cored fibreglass sandwich with 400 pounds [2400 lbs] of keel ballast). The centreboard reduces draft from 5ft 6in to 2ft 9in."

== See also ==
- List of sailing boat types

Similar sailboats

- Eagle 38
