= Boulger =

Boulger may refer to:

- Abraham Boulger (1835–1900), Irish officer, recipient of the Victoria Cross
- Demetrius Charles Boulger (1853–1928), British author
- E. V. Boulger (1846–1910), Irish academic, Professor of Classics in Adelaide
- George Simonds Boulger (1853–1922), English botanist
- John Boulger (born 1945), Australian speedway rider

== See also ==
- Bulger (disambiguation)
- Boulder (disambiguation)
