= Barnaby Bolger =

Irish Anglican cleric

Barnaby Bolger was an Anglican priest in Ireland during the seventeenth century.

Bolger was born in County Kilkenny and educated at Trinity College, Dublin. He was Prebendary of Clonamery in Kilkenny Cathedral from 1591 until 1615; and Prebendary of St John's in Christ Church Cathedral, Dublin from 1602 until 1613. He was Dean of Ossory from 1612 until his death in 1617. Bolger was also Prebendary of Kilmactalway in St Patrick's Cathedral, Dublin from 1615.
