= Dovekie 21 =

Sailboat class

Development
- Designer: Phil Bolger
- Location: United States
- Year: 1978
- No. built: 152 (by 1994)
- Builder: Edey & Duff
- Role: Cruiser
- Name: Dovekie 21

Boat
- Displacement: 600 lb (272 kg)
- Draft: 2.50 ft (0.76 m) with a leeboard down

Hull
- Type: monohull
- Construction: fiberglass
- LOA: 21.42 ft (6.53 m)
- LWL: 19.00 ft (5.79 m)
- Beam: 6.67 ft (2.03 m)

Hull appendages
- Keel: two leeboards
- Rudder: spade-type rudder

Rig
- Rig type: catboat rig

Sails
- Sailplan: catboat
- Mainsail area: 143.00 sq ft (13.285 m^{2})
- Total sail area: 143.00 sq ft (13.285 m^{2})

The Dovekie 21, often called just the Dovekie, is an American sailing dinghy, named for the sea bird. It was designed by Phil Bolger as a cruiser and first built in 1978.

== Production ==
The design was built by Edey & Duff in the United States. It was reported in 1994 that 152 examples had been completed, but it is now out of production.

== Design ==
The Dovekie is a recreational sailboat, built predominantly of fiberglass over an Airex foam core. It has a catboat rig with an aft-raked mast and a wishbone boom. The hull is flat-bottomed, with a raked stem, a canoe stern, a spade-type rudder controlled by a tiller and dual retractable leeboards, with a retractable bow centerboard. It displaces 600 lb (272 kg) and carries no ballast.

The boat has a draft of 2.50 ft (0.76 m) with a leeboard extended and 4 in (10 cm) with it retracted, allowing beaching or ground transportation on a trailer.

It may be powered by oars or a small outboard motor of up to 2 hp (1 kW) for docking and maneuvering.

For sailing the design is equipped with two sets of reefing points. For furling the sail is roll-gathered against the mast. It has built-in flotation and is unsinkable. The cockpit can accommodate four people and boat has space for two people to sleep overnight, on top of two stowage lockers in the forward cabin.

Factory standard equipment provided included an anchor, life jackets, oars and a signaling kit.

== Operational history ==
In a 1994 review Richard Sherwood described the design as "a cruising sailboat for two, with power available, but not necessary ... Meant for short cruises, and with the exceptional draft, gunkholing, (For minimum draft the leeboards are raised, and the small centerboard forward and the rudder reduce leeway.) The leeboards provide more space in the cabin. Since Dovekie is very light, oars, which are provided, may be used for auxiliary power. There are two sets of reef points, and an unusual method of furling: the sail is rolled forward on itself, but not on the mast."

In a 2010 review Steve Henkel wrote, the "Dovekie is basically a decked-over open boat. Bolger's design is unusual (some would say radical) with a dead-flat bottom (no rocker, no deadrise), leeboards, a tiny bow centerboard for working to weather in shallows, and oar ports so she can be used without resorting to outboard power (though a side-mounted outboard bracket is a popular option). Best features: Dovekie feels like a big skiff under sail, and is fairly stable both underway and at anchor, especially considering her light, unballasted hull .. Worst features: Rowing power or a 2-hp outboard will only move her at about 2 to 3 knots. Accommodations are minimal, though no worse than her [competitors]. Be prepared to rough it."

== See also ==
- List of sailing boat types
