= Stone Horse =

1931 recreational keelboat design

Development
- Designer: Samuel S. Crocker
- Location: United States
- Year: 1931
- No. built: 150
- Builder: Edey & Duff
- Name: Stone Horse

Boat
- Displacement: 4,500 lb (2,041 kg)
- Draft: 3.50 ft (1.07 m)

Hull
- Type: Monohull
- Construction: Fiberglass
- LOA: 23.33 ft (7.11 m) (hull length)
- LWL: 18.33 ft (5.59 m)
- Beam: 7.08 ft (2.16 m)
- Engine: Westerbeke Vire 6 hp (4 kW) inboard engine or an outboard motor

Hull appendages
- Keel: long keel
- Ballast: 2,000 lb (907 kg)
- Rudder: keel-mounted rudder

Rig
- Rig type: Cutter rig
- I foretriangle height: 28.50 ft (8.69 m)
- J foretriangle base: 10.50 ft (3.20 m)
- P mainsail luff: 25.75 ft (7.85 m)
- E mainsail foot: 12.83 ft (3.91 m)

Sails
- Sailplan: Cutter rigged sloop
- Mainsail area: 165.19 sq ft (15.347 m^{2})
- Jib/genoa area: 149.63 sq ft (13.901 m^{2})
- Total sail area: 314.81 sq ft (29.247 m^{2})

Racing
- PHRF: 246 (average)

The Stone Horse (sometimes called the Stone Horse 23 or Stone Horse 26) is an American trailerable sailboat that was designed by Samuel S. Crocker as a cruiser-racer and first built in 1931.

The design has a length overall of 23.33 ft (7.11 m) and a waterline length of 18.33 ft (5.59 m), but with a bowsprit and aft boomkin, the total length of the boat can exceed 26.00 ft (7.92 m).

Stone Horse is a shoal in Nantucket Sound, south of Cape Cod and had an associated lightvessel stationed there for many years.

== Production ==
The design was initially built starting in 1931 in Harwich Port, Massachusetts, with 38 built out of wood before the Second World War. The boat was redesigned for construction in fiberglass and was built by Edey & Duff in Massachusetts, United States, starting in 1968. Edey & Duff was a boat builder specializing in fiberglass versions of traditional wooden boat designs. A total of 150 Stone Horses were completed up to 2009, but Edey & Duff shut down when its general manager, Dave Davignon died that year. The boat is now out of production.

== Design ==
The design goals for the boat were established by the first customer, "a gentleman who asked Crocker for a stout boat that would handle the seas on Buzzards Bay and south of Cape Cod, have a good turn of speed, a large cockpit for sailing with friends and a comfortable cabin for occasional overnighting." The result was Crocker's Design Number 159.

The Stone Horse is a recreational keelboat, designed as a fast racer and cruiser for the Cape Cod and Buzzards Bay waters of the US east coast. The boats built between 1931 and World War Two were made from wood. The design was later built with Airex core fiberglass construction, with wood trim and built from 1968 to 2010.

The design has a cutter rig (although the manufacturer referred to it as a sloop rig, due to the small headsail size), a spooned raked stem, a canoe transom, a keel-mounted rudder controlled by a tiller and a fixed long keel. It displaces 4,500 lb (2,041 kg) and carries 2,000 lb (907 kg) of lead ballast.

Either of the two headsails made be fitted with a boom or a wishbone boom. The staysail is self-tacking and the jib has roller furling. The mainsail has two reefing points.

The boat has a draft of 3.50 ft (1.07 m) with the standard long keel fitted.

The boat can be fitted with a Westerbeke Vire 6 hp (4 kW), BMW 7 hp (5 kW) gasoline engine or a small outboard motor for docking and maneuvering. The fuel tank holds 5 U.S. gallons (19 L; 4.2 imp gal) and the fresh water tank has a capacity of 12 U.S. gallons (45 L; 10.0 imp gal).

The raised deck design provides good headroom in the cabin. Accommodation includes three bunks, one in the bow and two small quarter berths in the cabin, with the portable marine head located just aft of the mast. The galley is split between the port and starboard sides. The port side sink does not have a drain and instead a sink inset is emptied over the side. A cabin heater is also located on the port side. The cabin sole is typically carpeted and interior woodwork is mahogany. Cabin headroom is 45 in (114 cm). During the years in production the design was offered with a wide variety of options.

The design has a PHRF racing average handicap of 246 with a high of 243 and low of 255. It has a hull speed of 5.74 kn (10.63 km/h).

== Operational history ==
In a 2006 review in Cruising World, Ginny Walters, wrote, "Technically a sloop with two headsails, the Stone Horse, with its large mainsail, moves in the merest whisper of a breeze while the long keel holds it on course and facilitates self-steering. The boat is safe, kicky, and a sheer delight even in high-wind conditions that leave other boats at their moorings. The 8-foot cockpit welcomes guests and stays dry."

In a 2010 review Steve Henkel termed the design, "a fine little cruising boat for two people" and noted, "she's quite a pretty boat in a traditional way ... but in light air ... she's no speed demon."

In a 2011 user boat review on boats.com writer Steve Knauth described the design "The 23-foot Stone Horse sloop has enough room below for a spontaneous overnight or a weekend away, thanks to a deep, beamy hull with a full keel and keel-hung rudder. Above the waterline, she shows a distinctive profile with a spoon bow and a gentle faux sheer line ... The flush deck makes for a low cabin house, giving the boat pleasing proportions. Crocker gave the Stone Horse an ample cockpit, made larger by running the backstay to a boomkin."
