= Bulger, West Virginia =

Unincorporated community in West Virginia, United States

- Unincorporated community
- Location within West Virginia Location within the United States
- Coordinates: 38°8′00″N 81°58′52″W
- Country: United States
- State: West Virginia
- County: Lincoln
- Elevation: 804 ft (245 m)
- Time zone: UTC-5 (Eastern (EST))
  - Summer (DST): UTC-4 (EDT)
- GNIS feature ID: 1549616

Bulger is an unincorporated community in Lincoln County, West Virginia, United States. Its post office is closed.

The community was named after Andrew Jackson Mullins (Bulger) from the local Mullins family.
