= Robert J. Bolger =

American businessman

Robert J. Bolger (1922 – October 7, 2007) was an American businessman, the Founder and President of the National Association of Chain Drug Stores, and oversaw the transition of the drug store industry from regional to national chains.

== Biography ==
Robert J. Bolger was born in 1922 and raised in Philadelphia. He graduated from Villanova University with a B.S. degree in economics. He was a Navy fighter pilot during World War II and served on the Boxer and Independence aircraft carriers flying missions in F4U Corsairs.

He was the first president and CEO of the National Association of Chain Drug Stores from 1962 to 1987. Along with other founding drugstore chain executives, he helped to build the architecture of NACDS, and the entire drugstore chain industry. He helped establish the "Annual Meeting" of high-level figures in the industry.

Bolger helped to forge both the philosophical identity and physical home of NACDS, leading the project to secure the land and construct NACDS' current headquarters offices in Alexandria, Virginia, with the location partly chosen for its proximity to Capitol Hill. During his time at NACDS, Bolger expanded the association's government lobbying activities, helping to give the U.S. pharmaceutical industry the influence over government that it has today.

Bolger subsequently served as a member of the NACDS Honorary Board, and also served on the board of directors for Barr Pharmaceuticals from 1988 to 2002. In addition, he is one of the authors of the book, Chain Drug Store Management and Operations.
