= Paul G. Bulger =

US academic (1913-2000)

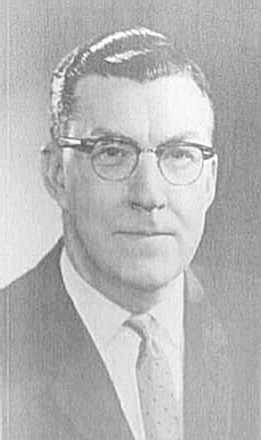

Dr. Paul Grutzner Bulger (July 25, 1913 - February 8, 2000) was the third president of Buffalo State College (State University of New York, College at Buffalo), serving from July 1, 1959 until January 1, 1967.

Known as "a gentleman and a scholar", President Bulger led some of the most sweeping changes in Buffalo State College's history including the planning and construction of new buildings for the fine arts, physical education, science, the student union, the library, the campus school and residence halls. He is also credited with doubling student enrollment and expanding the curriculum from that of a teacher's college to the largest multi-purpose college of arts and sciences in the SUNY system. Bulger was awarded the Alumni Lifetime Achievement Award from SUNY at Albany in 1998, and the Bulger Communications Center on the Buffalo State campus was named in his honor in 1993.

== College and University degrees ==
- B.S. SUNY at Albany, Albany, NY, 1936; M.S. 1941
- Ed.D Columbia University, New York, NY, 1951
- Doctor of Humane Letters, Canisius College, Buffalo, NY 1967
- Doctor of Humane Letters, Buffalo State College, Buffalo, NY, 1988
