= Phil Bolger =

American boat designer

Philip Cunningham Bolger
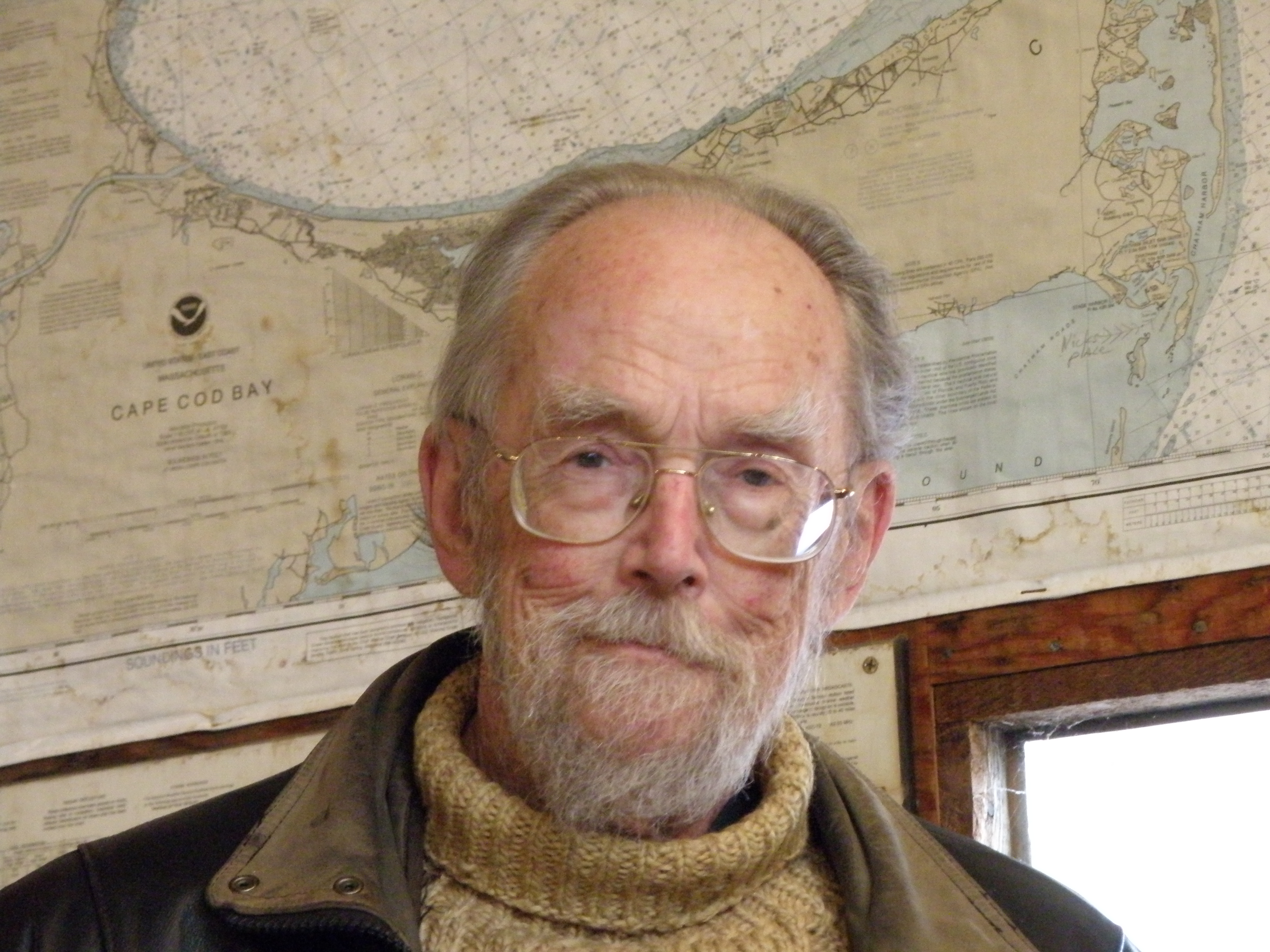
- Born: December 3, 1927; Gloucester, Massachusetts
- Died: May 24, 2009 (aged 81)
- Occupation: Boat designer
- Years active: 1950s–2009
- Spouse: Susanne Altenburger

Philip C. Bolger (December 3, 1927 – May 24, 2009) was a prolific American boat designer, who was born and lived in Gloucester, Massachusetts. He began work full-time as a draftsman for boat designers Lindsay Lord and then John Hacker in the early 1950s.

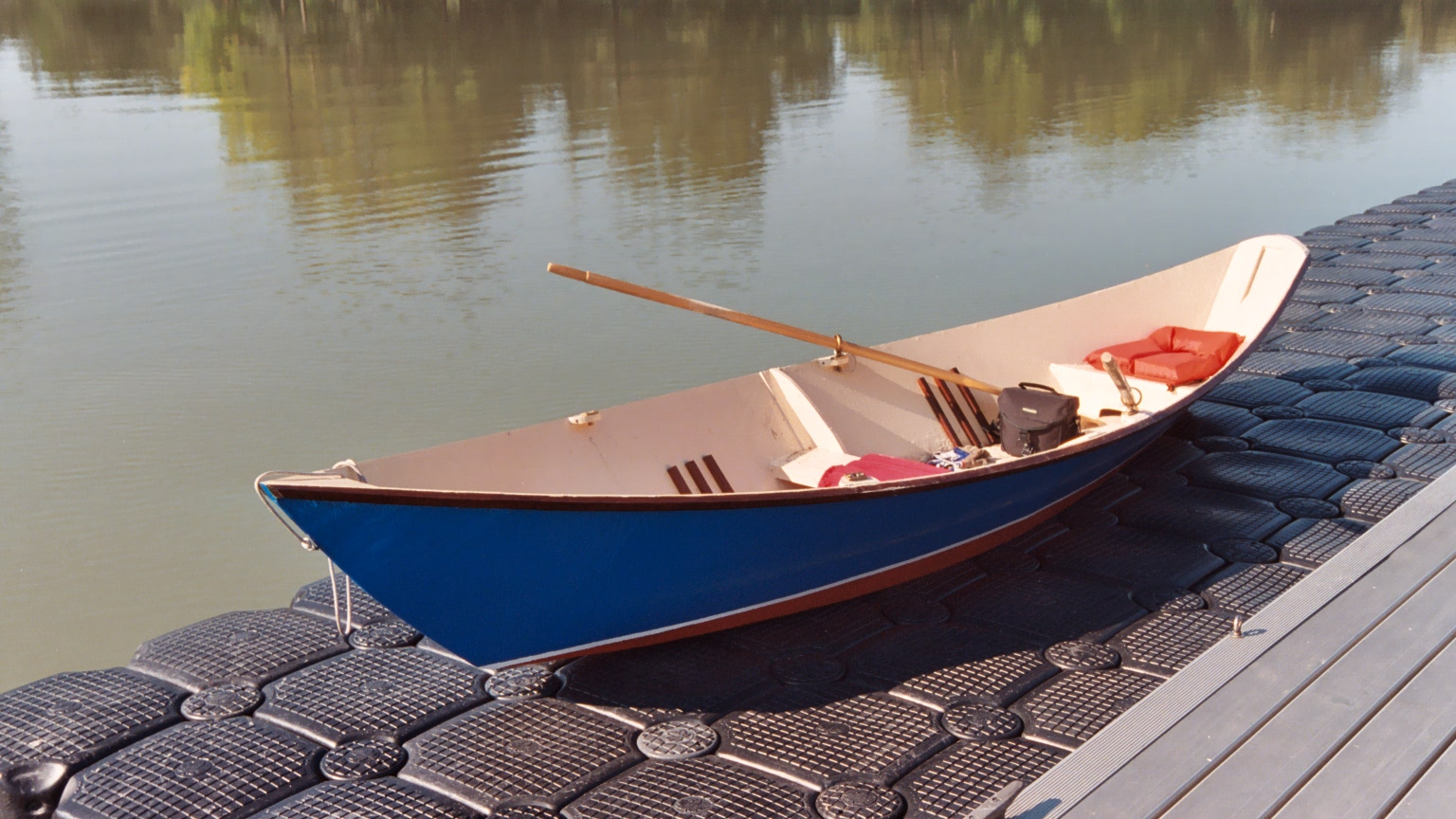
The Gloucester Light Dory, one of Bolger's better-known designs

Bolger's first boat design was a 32-foot (9.75 m) sportfisherman published in the January 1952 issue of Yachting magazine. He subsequently designed more than 668 different boats, from a 114-foot-10-inch (35 m) replica of an eighteenth-century naval warship, the frigate Surprise (ex-Rose), to the 6-foot-5-inch (1.96 m) plywood box-like dinghy Tortoise.

Although his designs ranged through the full spectrum of boat types, Bolger tended to favor simplicity over complexity. Many of his hulls are made from sheet materials — typically plywood — and have hard chines. A subclass of these designed in association with Harold Payson called Instant Boats were so named because they were intended to be easily built by amateurs out of commonly available materials. Bolger also advocated the use of traditional sailing rigs and leeboards.

From the 1990s, Phil Bolger teamed with his wife Susanne Altenburger, designing boats under the name Phil Bolger & Friends Inc. During this time, they emphasized the design of sustainable and fuel-efficient boats for the fishing industry. Also, they participated in a large military commission with the Naval Sea Systems Command on new designs for military landing craft utility boats.

Bolger was a prolific writer and wrote many books, the last being Boats with an Open Mind, as well as hundreds of magazine articles on small craft designs, chiefly in Woodenboat, Small Boat Journal and Messing About in Boats.

Bolger died on May 24, 2009, of a self-inflicted gunshot wound. His wife explained that "[h]is mind had slipped in the last several months, and he wanted to control the end of his life while he was still able."

== Instant Boats ==
Phil Bolger was unconventional in many ways and, among many large boats, yachts and custom designs, took an interest in what he termed "evolving crafty ways of building boats". As far back as 1957 he designed "Poohsticks" as a small plywood rowing skiff to be simply and economically built at home (originally by his brother). From this simple start he went on to develop a large number of designs for small- and medium-sized craft using plywood as a material for one-off construction at home or by small boatyards.

A Bolger-designed sharpie schooner, built of plywood in the "instant boat" style

In the 1970s, Phil Bolger began a long and successful collaboration with Harold 'Dynamite' Payson with Bolger designing the boats and Payson building them as well as selling plans and writing books about how to do it. 'Dynamite' called the first series of easy-to-build plywood boats "Instant Boats". Unlike traditional boat construction which involves building of jig and full size lofting of the shape of the hull prior to construction, the Instant Boat method uses shaped plywood panels on pre-shaped frames made of plywood and standard dimensional lumberyard wood. This results in quick construction and less requirement for skilled craftsmanship, and has proved appealing to amateur boat builders as well as many later designers who have followed in his footsteps, albeit much less prolifically.

Following articles in WoodenBoat magazine, Dynamite Payson published Instant Boats (1979, 152 pages, 7" × 10", 48 illustrations). It describes the original "Instant Boat" technique. Generically known as the "chine log method" or "simplified chine log method" the technique consists of (i) cutting body panels to a predetermined shape as given on the plans, (ii) wrapping them around frames or bulkheads, (iii) adding chines (small section planks of lumberyard wood) along the joints (either internally or externally) and fastening them together using glue and mechanical fasteners (nails or screws). The book described all the basic techniques (gluing, nailing and screwing with some fiberglass) to produce five designs: 12' Teal, 7'9" Elegant Punt, 12' Kayak, 31' Folding Schooner, 15'6" Surf, and 20'9" Zephyr. All these boats have single chines (i.e. have a bottom panel and two sides) and have their shape limited by the bevels given to the chines. The boats in Paysons book were designed for use on protected waters and none was self-bailing or designed to self-recover in case of capsize. However, Bolger designed many other boats using this building technique, including the ocean crossing AS-39 (or Loose Moose II) as well as a significant number of other boats.

Bolger's first generation of "chine log instant boats" for home building was followed by a generation of "stitch and glue" (aka "tack and tape") boats. This technique was made possible by the evolution of glues and the massification of polyester and epoxy resins combined with fiberglass tape. The new technique basically did away with the chine logs and mechanical fasteners and all the problems associated with their use (mainly the limitation of shape in the design phase, the carpentry challenge in the construction phase and damp/rot in the medium to long term). Instead of using a chine to join the precut panels, in stitch and glue, the preshaped panels are wrapped around bulkheads and/or frames in the same way as before. However, the panels are only temporarily held in place using nails, duct tape, cable ties, masking tape, wire or other mechanical means, while the seams are filled (both inside and outside the hull) with a resin and filler paste covered in one or more layers of fiberglass cloth or tape which in turn is saturated in resin. Once the resin hardens, the mechanical joint is stronger than the joined plywood and therefore structurally sound. Payson again popularised the technique in his book Build the New Instant Boats (1984, 160 pages, 8 1/2" × 11", 110 illustrations - Also still in print). In this book Payson introduces what he termed "Tack and tape" to the greater American public. The book includes plans for Gypsy (15' sail/oar/outboard), Nymph (7'9" dinghy with sail option), Diablo (15' motor boat for up to 25 HP outboard) as well as 8 more "traditional instant boats" using the chine log method: 16' Lug-rigger Windsprint, 6'5" Tortoise, 8' Skimmer, Dynamite Sailboard, 16'June Bug, Madeline a 19'6" Pedal-driven sidewheeler and the 23'6" Light Schooner. In 2007 Payson published his last book Instant Boatbuilding with Dynamite Payson which basically explains both techniques in less detail than the previous books and presents complete plans for 15 boats by Bolger. These are: Stitch and Glue: Payson's Pirogue (13' - canoe), Cartopper (11'6" - sail/oar), Sweet Pea (15' - sail/oar), Ruben's Nymph (7'9" - identical to Nymph but 1' wider - sail/oar), Diablo Grande (18' - power), Catfish (15' - sail/outboard) and Chebacco (19'8" - sail/outboard). The

== Sharpies ==
Bolger put a lot of thought into relatively cheap, high-performance boats. He is well known for designing a series of single chine sharpies, typically long and narrow with a flat bottom.

According to Bolger, sailing sharpies give good performance for the amount of sail they carry because of low to moderate displacement and light weight. In his opinion, the sharpie shape provides a simple construction in the plywood era with the added benefit that sailing sharpies extend the waterline as they heel, thereby effectively increasing the hull speed. Power sharpies can use low-horsepower motors (see, for example, the Bolger Tennessee, Idaho, and Sneakeasy designs) yet reach planing speeds in sheltered waters. Major critics of sharpies point to the fact that they tend to pound under certain conditions and that the relatively shallow draft makes them unseaworthy. Their advocates (including Bolger) point to the fact that they are exceptionally good boats for their cost, make excellent day boats and are increasingly seaworthy as (i) the length to beam ratio increases, (ii) they are adequately ballasted and (iii) they are given reserve stability and/or made watertight sufficiently to ensure that they self-right in the event of a capsize. Sharpies may be considered one of the simplest types of boat from the construction point of view. However, their design is controversial and primarily dependent on the intended use.

Bolger is particularly known for his Square Boats (derogatorily known as "Bolger Boxes"). Bolger reasoned that a simple rockered bottom and vertical sides gives the most volume, and form stability, on a given beam. After experimenting and studying traditional sharpies and the writings of small-boat historian Howard I. Chapelle and others, he developed the theory that the optimum chine line for a sailing sharpie should represent a regular curve without breaks, changes in radius or straight sections. He further reasoned that the curve of side and bottom should match as much as possible to reduce turbulence. He further reasoned that the sharpie was an ideal shape for a trailer sailer with either leeboards or bilgeboards to provide lateral plane. Bolger felt that the traditional sharpie shape Chapelle had documented based on traditional New England sharpies (with a slightly different chine profile) was inefficient and prone to causing steering difficulties.

Both designers thought traditional rigs and boat types were suitable for small yachts, especially sailing boats. Generally, Chapelle noted that neither transom nor bow should be immersed when the boat is loaded, a point on which Bolger agreed. Later in his career Phil Bolger and Friends developed modifications to the simple sharpie bow to avoid hull slap at anchor at the expense of a much more complex geometry.

Bolger evolved the concept of traditional sharpies and by squaring off the bow and stern to give the longest useful waterline. Most were configured as yawls (with main mast quite far forward and a small mizzen far aft). The bow on these designs is cut off and blunt and the sterns are vertical. In some designs an open bow can allow passage to land if the boat is beached, space for holding anchors and cables, or clearance to step and unstep a mast. Oldshoe, Micro and Long Micro have shallow ballasted full length keels whereas what he called the "Advanced Sharpies" AS19, AS29 and AS39 have one or two bilgeboards and inside ballast. The latter are very definitely in the extended cruise/liveaboard category.

== Leeboards and rigs ==
Bolger championed leeboards as low-tech and practical, to the chagrin of many yachties. The conventional wisdom is that they are ugly. Even many of his centerboard designs had boards that were off-center or all the way to one side or the other (for example, the Birdwatcher and the AS29). He concluded that a single leeboard is sufficient in many cases on small boats, and that rigs could be stepped off the centerline without much effect on performance. Bolger advocated leeboards as being a simple means of providing lateral plane to all types of sailing vessel, eliminating many of the disadvantages of centerboards, daggerboards and keels, following broadly in the concepts of L. Francis Herreshoff, various years his senior and, as stated by Bolger, one of the most influential yacht designers from his perspective.

He used traditional rigs, from the simplest "Cat rig" (single sail) through sloops, many yawls and schooners at a time when almost all other designers were concentrating purely on racing rule derived sloops. The diversity of rigs was accompanied by a broad spectrum of sails including the sprit-boomed leg of mutton, the sprit sail, the gaff sail, the lug sail and the lateen in addition to the classic Bermudan/marconi rig. His book '100 Sailing Rigs "Straight talk"' later reedited as '103 Sailing Rigs "Straight talk"' provides a fascinating look at both rig configurations and sail types as well as his insight into a subject in which he was undoubtedly an expert.

With experience spanning over 600 designs, he had ample opportunity to experiment with various designs, rigs, and materials. His commentary in books and periodicals is grounded in research, analysis, and firsthand experience with different configurations. He also clearly explains the mistakes he encountered, the corrections he made, and the reasoning behind them.

== Later years - Advanced Gloucester Fisherman Project ==
Isometric rendering of the hull shape of the composite plywood, fiberglass and foam 70 ft × 14 ft × 3 ft draft, 25 ton displacement, 160-200 hp, 10.5 knots, capable of being owner built. The Advanced Gloucester Fisherman Project boat.

Beginning in November 2002, Bolger and Altenberger began a re-examination of fisheries economics, as a result of the partial collapse of the industry both globally and locally in their hometown of Gloucester, Massachusetts. Their proposal centered on the principle that, in an era of high fuel cost and economic pressure for modernization of depressed fishing ports, sustainable fisheries require a balance of business economics and public planning versus the available fishery resources.

They argued the key to this was a restructuring of the fishing fleet towards boats with lower complexity, lower initial cost, better fuel economy, and lower operating costs.

Most modern vessels are horsepower intensive concepts with often oversized drive trains that cost extra in terms of hardware, operation, repair and replacement. ... Today this is as economical and sustainable as taking a Suburban™-size SUV to the mall to buy a pair of socks.

Large expensive complex boats demand taking a high number of fish to be economical. Simpler, lower powered, and lower cost boats can still be economical with lower fish catch rates.

Bolger and Altenberger expressed concern that existing governmental fishing permits issued based on length of the fishing boat, created an incentive to use inefficient wide and deep fishing boat hulls. If the fishing permits were issued based instead on displacement tonnage of the hull, then the incentive would be for the fishing industry to use long, narrow and shallow hulls which would be more economical to purchase and to operate per ton of fish caught.

The existing fishing fleet, composed of ever larger boats with high construction costs, debt loads and operational costs, in the long run forced fishermen to search for ever increasing catch sizes to remain economic while in a fight against regulatory quotas.

Bolger and Altenburger argued that, ultimately, fishermen would find it more economically sustainable to do more with less. A consolidated fleet of smaller more economical vessels could make it possible for fishermen to survive with lower catch rates, lower debt load, lower fuel burn, lower insurance rates and lower depreciation.

This idea was described in the September 2004 issue of the magazine National Fisherman, and again in 2007 as a series of essays published in the magazine Messing About in Boats. The project to build a prototype was authorised but was never developed on any significant commercial scale within Phil Bolger's lifetime.

== Design list ==
Listed below are a selection of more commonly encountered designs by Phil Bolger.

Design Name	Type	Design	Size	Reference	Comments	ImgURL	LinkURL
1952 Sport Fisherman					Phil Bolger's first published design	image	link
22 ft Motorsailer	Sail & 16 hp. Yanmar		22'9" x 7'9" x 21"		Gaff rig, box keel, from Small Boat Journal #74 5500 # disp.		
23 ft Fantail Launch	Power		23'0"x6'0"x1'10"		Cold-molded or carvel power launch in classic style. Ref: WoodenBoat Store		
23 ft Motorsailer	sail/OB	#601	22'7"x8'0"x9"		Plywood step sharpie with dipping lug rig, sleeps two. Ref: BDQ#4		
30 ft Camper/Daysailer		#423	32'x7'	V11-N22			
3-Meter Tri	sail	Concept	10'x8'	V08-N23, V14-N01	class racer trimaran, 60 sq. ft. sail, molded hull and amas.23		
40 Foot Diesel Cruiser						image	link
A Trailer Motor Sailer		#605	19'8"x7'5"	V11-N03		image	
Abbondanza	25-45 hp IB Diesel	#652	24'x8'3"	V16-N12	Step sharpie steel fishing boat	image	
Ada	Power, Sail		26' x6'		Cruiser - fast plywood motorsailer - ref: BWAOM Ch#61		
Advanced Fisherman 30							
Advanced Fisherman 70							
Africa	Sail - 8,800 lbs displ.	#350	28'8" x7'		Cruiser - carvel, fixed keel - ref: 30oddBoats Ch#33	image	
Alaska Motorsailing	sail, 488sf, 8 hp. Diesel		30' x 10' x 2',.		Box keel motorsailer with central cargo hold, sleeps 4		
Alaskan One-Man		#446	26'x10'	V09-N16			
Alert	Sail - 8,560 lbs. displ.	#357	33'6" x 7'8" x 1'6"	V15-N06,V16-N17	Leeboard Cat Yawl Cruiser - ref: Diff. Boats aka Manatee, Chinese Gaff Rig		
Alice	Power - 7,400 lbs displ.		28' x7'10"		Cruiser - displacement, inboard - ref: BWAOM Ch#37	image	
All-Weather Houseboat	Power	#250	29'10" x13'11"		Houseboat - inboard, displacement hull - ref: FoldingSch Ch#30	image	
Aluminum Diesel Launch		#332	30'x8'6"	V11-N12		image	
Aluminum Lugger		#456	42'x9'10"	V12-N12		image	
Aluminum Trailer Cruiser		#343	36'x7'11"	V11-N07		image	
Amesbury Skiff Mippet	oar	#260	9'6" x 3'6"		Multi-chined rowing skiff - Ref. SmallBoats Ch#1	image	
Amherst Galley	Schooner	#643	26'9" x 5'8"	V14-N24	Schooner BDQ#14	image	
Anhinga	Sailing canoe + oars	#484	23'3" x 5'	V06-N11		image	link
Antispray 48	Sail	#642	48'5" x 12'6" x 28"		Long Island Sound sharpie, offshore cruiser, 41,000 lbs displacement	image	
Apogee	Sail - 10,700 lbs displ.	#397	38' x9'8"		Cruiser - aluminum leeboard ketch - ref: 30oddBoats Ch#35		
Arava	Leeboard Sailboat	#509	9.0 x 3.03 x 0.6m	V12-N20	leeboard cruiser, MAIB 3-1-95 (29.5 x 9.95 x 1.96 ft)	image	
Archaeopteryx	Sail	#202	15'6" x6'		Daysailer - plywood scow - ref: SmallBoats Ch#23	image	
AS-19 Advanced Sharpie	191sf Cat Yawl rig, 8 hp	#550/559	19'6" x 5'6"	V17-N15,16	Trailerable lee-board daysailer. 500 lead ballast. Boxy with blunt bow.	image	
AS-29	Advanced Sharpie 29	#547	29'6"x7'10"	V06-N22, V11-N04	(Monster Micro) Cat Yawl		
AS-29 (Advanced Sharpie)	Sail	#547	29'6"x7'10"x1'1"	V11-N04,V19-N18	Gaff yawl, bilgeboards BWAOM Ch#69 Minimal bluewater liveaboard	image	link
AS-39	Sail - 10,920 lbs displ.	#576	37.7' x7.9'		Plywood liveaboard - ref: BWAOM Ch#70, AKA Loose Moose II, Advanced		
Ataraxia	Sail - 17,375 lbs displ.		36' x9.84'		Cruiser - lugsail - ref: BWAOM Ch#71	image	
Auckland Catamaran	Sail - 1,900 lbs displ.		31'6" x15'10"		Daysailer - plywood - ref: BWAOM Ch#33, BDQ#6	image	
Auray Punt	Row	#599	9'9" x4'2"	V10-N18,V18-N08	Punt - plywood - ref: BWAOM Ch#5;	image	link
Auxiliary Lugger			48'x13'	V12-N18			
Bahama Dinghy..Yacht		#524	12'x4'8"	V10-N16			
Bain Yacht Tender	S, P, R - 329 lbs displ.	#291	2.3m x1.06m		Dinghy - fibreglass - ref: FoldingSch Ch#18		
Balanced Lug Cat				V15-N13			
Baltic Sea Cruiser-Racer	Marconi sloop, OB	#168	10.1m x 2.51m x 1.5m	V15-N20	Cold molded or carvel blue water sailer.	image	
Bantam 16/20	15 hp - 25 hp	#654	6m x 2.44m	V17-N02	"Outboard Dayboat/Light Cruiser", low power planing trimaran hull. Collapsable	image	link
Barge Houseboat	none - 5,300 lbs displ.		25'6" x7'10"		Houseboat - plywood - ref: BWAOM Ch#58	image	
Barge Houseboat (scow)	OB	#481	20'x8'				
Barn Owl	Sail - 31,800 lbs displ.	#463	49.9' x12.47'		Cruiser - light-draft schooner - ref: BWAOM Ch#74	image	
Bateau		#517	24 ft rowboat		Old Common Sense Designs catalogue, 23'6" ft Teal type		
Beach Cat		#589			Improved internal ergonomics, seating, and centreboard. aka Catfish Beachcruiser		
Beach Cruiser Concept			19' x 4'3"	V16-N01		image	
Becky Thatcher	foot powered	#669	19' 9" x 5' 4" x 6"		Sternwheeler cabin extended cruiser.	image	
Bee	Power	#581	7' 5"		Minimum sized Step Sharpie	image	
Bell's Puffer	Ocean Passagemaker	#634	45'	V17-N11	Ocean Passagemaker	image	
Berengaria	Sail - 10,000 lbs displ.		32' x8'2"		Cruiser - slot cabin, water ballast - ref: BWAOM Ch#53	image	
Big Bird	Sail - 31,600 lbs. displ.	#334	18.84m x 3.68m		Leeboard Schooner Cruiser - ref: Diff. Boats Ch#27		
Big Query	Sail		29' x7' x11"		Ply Bowsteering Cruiser - ref: Diff. Boats Ch#30		
Big Tortoise	Row/sail		8' x 3'2"	Payson		image	
Bilge Keel Yawl		#333	23'6"x5'8"	V12-N16		image	
Bird of Dawning	Sail - 16,800 lbs. displ.	#361	12m x3m x0.6m		Leeboard Yawl Cruiser - ref: Diff. Boats Ch#27	image	
Birdwatcher	Sail	#496	23'6" x 5'7"		"Birdwatcher Style" Instant Boat, Oar/Sail		
Birdwatcher II	Sail, oar, power	#496B	23'6" x 5'7"		2004 upgrade of Birdwatcher, ref: Wooden Boat Magazine Aug2004 issue.	image	
Black Skimmer	Sail - 2,800 lbs displ.	#294	25'3" x7'		Sharpie Cruiser - plywood leeboard cat-yawl - ref: FoldingSch Ch#11, BDQ#1 & 6	image	link
Blackbird		#443			Old Common Sense Designs catalogue		
Blackgauntlet II	Sail - 7,400 lbs displ.	#267	33'6" x7'7"		Cruiser - plywood leeboard cat-yawl - ref: FoldingSch Ch#12	image	
Blacksnake	Keel Sloop		32' x 6'2"	V17-N03			
Blueberry	Sail - 4,000 lbs displ.	#420	20'3" x7'3"		Cruiser - plywood deep-keel cutter - ref: BWAOM Ch#57, SBJ No.66	image	link
Bobcat	Sail		12'3" x6'		Catboat Daysailer - multichine plywood - ref: BWAOM Ch#21	image	link
Bolger runabout						image	link
Bonefish	Sportfishing Boat		20'x7'9"	V12-N23	'Two cycle inboard' Econo-Concept		
Bowsteering Dovekie	Sail	#292a	21.4' x6'		Mini-cruiser - experimental - ref: 30oddBoats Ch#28	image	
Boxer	Sail - 300 lbs. displ.	#330	12' x3'6"		Styrofoam-fibreglass Daysailer - ref: Diff. Boats	image	
Boy's Launch	Power - 2,600 lbs displ.		14' x6'7"		Inboard Launch - displacement hull - ref: BWAOM Ch#27	image	
Breakdown Punt	Row		5'6" x3'6"		Punt - plywood tender - ref: BWAOM Ch#1	image	
Breakdown Schooner	Sail - 13,000 lbs displ.	#418	46'11" x7'8"		Cruiser - plywood c/b schooner - ref: BWAOM Ch#60	image	
Brick	Row, Sail	#458	8' x4'	V15-N23	Punt - plywood - ref: BWAOM Ch#2,	image	link
Brick Connecter	NA				aka "Grout" or "Mortar". Attach two bricks end to end to form an 18'x4' schooner.		
Brick, gaff rigged	Gaff rig for brick						
Brigantine	Sail		32' x9'		Square rigged cruiser, seven working sails, ref: BWAOM Ch#43, BDQ#5	image	
Bright Thread	Cat Yawl	#445	26'x10'	V09-N14		image	
Budget Bateau			25'6 x 4'10"	V05-N16			
Bulk Cargo Carrier	Sail - 460,000 lbs. displ.				Ketch Cargo Carrier - ref: Diff. Boats Ch#31		
Bunny R	6 cyl inboard, 36sf	#430	28'0"x10'0"x2'9"		Traditional Lobsterboat planked on bent oak frames.	image	link
Burgundy	Sail - 3,500 lbs displ.	#384	28' x6'3"		Dayboat-cruiser - keel cat ketch - ref: 30oddBoats Ch#10	image	link
Cabin Clam Skiff 18	Power 5 hp to 40 hp O.B.	#606-II	18'x5'3"	V17-N22,V19-N10	8' cabin on #606 "Clam Skiff" workboat	image	
Cagliostro	Power	#224	41.3' x11.8'		Dayboat - planing hull - ref: 30oddBoats Ch#26	image	
California Lobsterboat	Power	#271	30' x7'10"		Fishing boat - inboard, planing hull - ref: FoldingSch Ch#29		
Camp Cruiser	Sail or oars	Concept	19'0"x4'4"	V13-N09	Initial study for the Common Sense Skiff?		
Camper Sailboat		#640	18'x5'3x6"	V14-N18		image	link
Camping Trimaran	Sail	#554		V09-N18	Uses Hobie16 floats rig & hardware. Ref:		
Canard	Sail		20' x4'6"		Daysailer - experimental bowsteerer - ref: BWAOM Ch#23	image	
Canoe ("Payson Pirogue")	paddle	#495	13'x2'4"	V09-N09	Double-paddle canoe	image	
Canoe Yawl	Sailboat	#105-11-60	23 ft		Unknown Bolger design 1960 strip planked/ballasted keel sold in 2009 in Boston	image	
Canoe Yawl	Canoe Yawl	#433	21'x6'	V11-N10		image	
Canoe Yawl Concept			16'x6'6"	V10-N10			
Canoe Yawl Concept			28'x6'7"	V10-N20			
Caribbean Liveaboard		#355	38'x9'	V10-N03		image	
Cartopper	sail, row, power	#519	11'6'X4'			image	
Casual Sailing Dinghy	Sail Row		16' or 19'6 X 6'		gaff cat, centreboard, day-racer-sailer. aka Cartoon 40 aka Plywood Catboat		
Cat Ketch Power		#354	37'	V09-N06			
Catfish	Beachcruiser			V11-N08			
Catfish Beachcruiser	Cat sail	4##?	15' 1 1/2" x 6' 6"		Plywood catboat with salient keel fin. Flat bottom, double chine. aka Beach Cat		
Centennial II	Sail	#322	24'0" x 5'11" x 3'6"		Plywood Cat Yawl Cruiser - ref: Diff. Boats Ch#11	image	
Ceremonial Barge	Row		23'3" x4'6"		Rowboat - plywood, four oars - ref: BWAOM Ch#12	image	
Champlain	OB 9.9 hp	#636	22'	V14-N07,V16-N11	Step-sharpie 22' Trailerable OB cabin cruiser -	image	
Champlain, update		#636		V16-N11			
Charity	Power - 5,000 lbs displ.	#398	25'6" x8'		Outboard Dayboat - aluminum planing hull - ref: 30oddBoats Ch#17	image	
Charlie's Catboat		#530	29'x8'3"	V09-N08			
Chebacco	Sail	#540, #575	19'8" x 7'5"	V15-N16	Cat yawl. Ref: BWAOM,	image	link
Chebacco 25		#602	25'4"x7'11"	V12-N04		image	
Chebacco Boat #1	Sail - 1,740 lbs displ.		19'8" x7'5"		Dayboat - plywood cat yawl - ref: BWAOM Ch#45		
Chebacco Boat #2	Sail - 1,740 lbs displ.		19'8" x7'5"		Cruiser - plywood cat yawl - ref: BWAOM Ch#45		
Chebbaco		#575	15 4	V15-N04			
Chebbaco 20	Cat-Yawl	#540	19'8"x7'9"	V20-N02		image	
Chicago Coble	Power - 2,800 lbs displ.	#273	25'1" x6'		Dayboat - outboard, 2 versions - ref: FoldingSch Ch#26		
Chippewa	Power	#10-58	20' x7'9"		Dayboat - planing hull - ref: SmallBoats Ch#31	image	
Clam Cabin Skiff	5 hp to 40 hp O.B.	#606	18'x5'3"	V17-N22	Rugged flat bottom plywood workskiff. aka "Workskiff 18"	image	link
Clam Skiff	Power - 1,100 lbs displ.	#606	18' x5'3"	V11-N17	Fishing boat - outboard, plywood - ref: BWAOM Ch#15		
Class lV OSTAR Racer			29'6"x7'6"	V12-N24			
Coastal 22		#184-11-59	22'5" x 7'9"	Texas Dory catalogue			
Coastal Cruising				V13-N16			
Col.H.G.Hasler	Sail	#635	20'0"x8'0"x2'0"	V15-N07,12	Steel singlehand circumnavigator, centerboard, Chinese gaff yawl. BDQ#12 & 13	image	link
Cold Molded Sailboat	Sail with OB auxiliary	#483	36'0"x11'0"x4'6"	V13-N18	Cold-molded, free-standing mast, gaff rig.		
Cold-Water Outboard	15 hp outboard		21'3" x 7'2" x 9"		Strip planked outboard power, early glass house example. SBJ Cartoon #7		
Cold-water Sailboard	Sail	#301	15'9" x3'11"		Daysailer - daggerboard, plywood - ref: FoldingSch Ch#5		
Commercial Gill-Net	IB power		51'6"x16'0"x5'6"	V13-N08	Hard-chined wooden fishing vessel designed around a 600 hp twelve cylinder		
Common Sense Skiff		#571	15'6"x4'2"	V10-N13		image	
Commuter		#566	20'x7'9"	V11-N02			
Compact Charter Schooner		#348	45'3" x 14' 7"	V11-N15		image	
Corsair 24	Sail	#467	23'6" x5'10"		Aft-mast Daysailer - keel sharpie, no mainsail - ref: BWAOM Ch#30		
Cove Dweller						image	link
Cruising Canoe						image	link
Cruising Catamaran			31'x16'	V09-N		image	
Cruising Catamaran	Single staysail from aft				Motor, centreboard, workshop, rudder, cockpit	image	
Cruising Catamaran			50'x22'	V10-N14		image	
Cruising Catboat		#536	21'10"x7'9"	V12-N05		image	
Cruising Chebbaco				V15-N15	Cruising Chebbaco Light Cruiser version		
Cruising Cutter	Cruising Cutter Concept		25'6"x4'6"	V15-N24			
Cruising Lugger	sail	Concept	35'0"x8'1"x5'6"	V13-N12	Thames barge hull with dipping lug and a deep keel.		
Cruising Rowboat	Row - 2,050 lbs displ.		21' x5'		Rowboat - strip planked - ref: BWAOM Ch#13	image	
Cruising Sharpie	Cruising Sharpie		56'x10'7"	V10-N07			
Crystal	Row - 593 lbs. displ.	#352	15'6"" x 3'6"	V19-N05	Plywood Rowboat - ref: Diff. Boats Ch#3;	image	
Currach	Power - 6,400 lbs displ.	#408	24' x7'7"		Outboard Ferry - steel planing hull - ref: 30oddBoats Ch#16	image	
Cynthia J	Sail	#289	14'6" x5'6"		Mini-cruiser - plywood leeboard catboat - ref: FoldingSch Ch#10	image	
Dakini	Sailing dory		34'6" x 7'11"			image	link
Dakota	Ouboard, 50 hp		38'8"x7'3"x1'0"		'Prefabricated River Cruiser'	image	
Dart Dinghy	Sail		11'6" x4'6"		Dinghy - multichine plywood - ref: BWAOM Ch#6	image	
Dawn Treader			48' x 12'8"	Boatbuilder Sept'95	Steel dipping lugsail 'Solution48"	image	
Day Racing Schooner	Sail - 11,850 lbs displ.	#541	39'9" x8'11"	V09-N17,V19-N09	Cruiser - deep keel, fisherman style - ref: BWAOM Ch#42; BDQ#2		
Daysailer/Overnighter	Marconi Sloop, IB	#176	41'6"x7'7"x5'3"	V15-N21	Carvel planked keel day sailer with cuddy.	image	
Daysailer/Weekender	Daysailer/Weekender		33'x7'7"	V13-N04			
Defender	oar	#236	11' x 3'10"		Vintage lapstrake yacht tender	image	link
Delaware					Trawler	image	link
Design 344	Sail	#344	21' x 6'(?)	V26-N11	Proposed home-built version of Dovekie	image	link
Destrier	Power	#8-58	28' x11'		Cruiser - lapstrake planing hull - ref: SmallBoats Ch#33		
Deuce		#473	17' x 4'10" x 3'3"		Old Common Sense Designs catalogue, English Cutter "The Deuce"		
Diablo	Power (24 Max H.P.)	#432	15'x5'		Double chine open powerboat.	image	
Diablo Grande	power	#603	18'0"x6'0"		Double chine open powerboat for 40 hp OB. Ref: BDQ#18	image	
Diamond Cruising Kayak	double paddle	Concept	~19.5'	V15-N10	Plywood kayak with copious gear stowage. aka 'Diamond'	image	link
Dido	Sprit Cat Yawl, w/ 9' oar	#431	25'7"x6'7"x7"		Fiberglass/Airex homebuild option to a Dovekie + precursor to Birdwatcher.		
Diesel Launch	Yanmar diesel, mizzen	#379?	12m x 2.44m x .75m		Box keel slender 39'4" launch Construction #579? illegible number		
Diesel Launch			39'4"x8'	V12-N14			
Dolphin	Row, Sail - 1,200 lbs	#259	18' x4'		Dayboat - round-bilge double-ender - ref: SmallBoats Ch#9	image	
Donovan's Tender	Oars	#647	11'8" x 4'2"	V15-N18	Modified punt rowboat with low power OB option.	image	
Double Brick						image	link
Double Eagle	Sail/ yawlboat auxiliary	#646	39' x 16'6"	V16-N09,10	Plywood catamaran.	image	
Double Eagle 657	Sail designed for	#657	39'0"x20'0"	V18-N11,12	Enlarged, modified "Double Eagle" catamaran.		
Double Eagle Yawlboat	power	#651	12'2" x 6'3"	V16-N08	Yawlboat for the Double Eagle sailboat	image	
Double Query	Sail	#377	16' x7'9"		Ply Bowsteering Daysailer Catamaran - D.Boats#30		
Dovekie 21	Sail, Row	#292	21.4' x6'		Cruiser - production fibreglass - ref: FoldingSch Ch#24	image	
Dugong	167 sf sail / oars	#365	26'0"x5'4"x3 ft		Cold-molded Ref: Different Boats, Chapter 8 big sister to Dovekie	image	
Dugout	Power		11'9" x3'		Outboard Dayboat - carved from wooden lifts - ref: BWAOM Ch#35	image	
Dynamite Sailboard	Sail - 250 lbs displ.	#406	15'11" x2'		Sailboard - plywood - ref: 30oddBoats Ch#2	image	link
Economy Motorsailer	Power, Sail	#282	25'10" x7'8"		Cruiser - outboard, moulded hull - ref: FoldingSch Ch#28		
Economy Seagoing Cruiser	Sail - 8,300 lbs displ.		34'6" x6'6" x1'1.5"		Sharpie Cruiser - plywood, leeboards - ref: 30oddBoats Ch#1	image	
Eeek!	Sail - 280 lbs displ.	#407	11'6" x2'		Cruising Canoe - plywood, leeboard - ref: 30oddBoats Ch#1	image	link
Egg Harbor 31	Power	May 1957	31				
Electric Launch	24V 1 hp electric	#321	15'11" x 4'6"		Electric Motor Inboard Launch Airex fiberglass - DBoats Ch#5 also SBJ V2#2		
Electric Spartina						image	link
Elegant Folkboat						image	link
Elegant Punt	Sail	#279	7'9" x3'7"		Dinghy - plywood - ref: FoldingSch Ch#1	image	link
Express 22	Power	#149	22'6"x 7'6" x 8"	Texas Dory plan 25	80-250 hp outboard or I/O		
Fancy	Sail - 725 lbs displ.	#394	15'7" x13'3"		Dayboat - Friendship sloop lookalike - ref: 30oddBoats Ch#29	image	
Fantail Launch		#419	21'x6'	V11-N20	23?'x6'	image	
Fast Beach Landing			36'x8'3"	V12-N02			
Fast Brick						image	
Fast Cruising Schooner			50'x13'6"	V12-N09			
Fast Motorsailer		#560	25'x6'6"	V10-N02			
Fast Sport Fisherman			32'x12'	V10-N19			
Fast Sternwheeler	Power		25'6" x7'8"		Cruiser - plywood garvey hull - ref: BWAOM Ch#59	image	
Featherwind	sail/row	#262	15'6" x 4'6"		Modified twice by Carnell, approved by Bolger.	image	
Felucca	Sail - 665 lbs. displ.	#349	4.9m x 1.52m		Leeboards Beach Cruiser - ref: Diff. Boats Ch#7	image	
Fenestra				V21-N05			
Ferra							
Fiddler II	Power - 2,000 lbs displ.	#391	15'10" x6'8"		Minimal Cruiser - planing hull, outboard - ref: 30oddBoats Ch#4	image	
Fie Fia		#154	32'x9'	V11-N23	Tropical Commuter	image	
Fieldmouse	sail	#234	7'9" x 4'0"		Lapstrake sailing pram	image	
Fiji	sail with I/O diesel	#662	39'4"x12'1"x2'1"	V20-N10,11,12	Plywood box-cutwater sharpie bluewater cruiser Ref: BDQ#22,	image	
Firebrand	Power - 1,120 lbs displ.	#388	26'6" x4'3"		Steam Launch - plywood, planing hull - ref: 30oddBoats Ch#9	image	
Fishcat	Power	#469 (?)	16 feet		catamaran	image	link
Fisher-Boy 15	OB	#201	15'4" x 5'6"	Texas Dory plan #10	20 hp outboard dory runabout		
Fisher-Boy 15 inboard	OB	#201b	15'4" x 5'6"	Texas Dory plan #10	4 hp inboard motor, November '66 'rental fishing boat'		
Fisherman's Launch	Power	#537	21'4"		WoodenBoat #164 or Small Boat Journal #67 aka Sometime or Never		
Flat Bottom Outboard Cruiser						image	link
Flat Iron Skiff		#414	14'x3'3"	V11-N13	21'?x6'?		
Flying Cloud	Sailing Pram	#614?	8'x4'	V11-N17?			
Flying Splinter	Power - 3,900 lbs displ.	#319	29.5' x6.86'		Dayboat - planing, auxiliary sail - ref: 30oddBoats Ch#22		
Folding Schooner	Sail	#268	31' x 5'	V17-N07	Open skiff hull folds for compact storage	image	link
Forest Belle	Sailboat	Cartoon			Carvel planked yawl. Narrow beam. Woodenboat #66 Sep/Oct 1985	image	
Garvey Daysailer			18'x6'9"	V12-N15		image	link
Garvey Outboard Utility			16'x6'	V12-N22			
Gill-netter Houseboat	Power - 15,650 lbs displ.	#302	35'10" x12'		Houseboat - inboard, lobsterboat hull - ref: FoldingSch Ch#31		
Gloucester Yawl	Sail	#261	21' x5'6"		Dayboat - 3 masts, box keel - ref: SmallBoats Ch#10		
Glouchester Gull runabout	OB		15'4"x4'2	Texas Dory plan 12	7 1/2 to 20 hp Outboard runabout "Gas Saver Dory Skiff"		
Grandpa's Pirate Ship	Sail - 5,300 lbs displ.		22' x8'11"		Cruiser - bilge keels, cat rig - ref: BWAOM Ch#51	image	
Grout					See: "Brick Connecter"		
Gulf of Mexico Cruiser	Cruiser	Concept	49'x15'x2'6"	V13-N02			
Gypsy	58 sf sprit rig sail	#436	15' x 4'	V14-N06?	150 lbs two chine tack + tape daggerboard fast sailboat	image	link
Halloween	Power - 2,500 lbs displ.	#211	25'6" x6'10"		Dayboat - round-bilge planing hull - ref: SmallBoats Ch#32	image	
Harbinger	Sail	#280	15' x7'1"		Dayboat - moulded hull, cat rig - ref: FoldingSch Ch#22	image	
Hard Bottom Inflatable			7'6"x4'	V13-N22		image	
Hard Bottom Inflatable	Hard Bottom Inflatable	#438	20'	V11-N14		image	
Hardbottom Inflatable	oars	Concept	7'6"/6'5"x4'0"/2'9"	V13-N22	Rigid Inflatable Boat		
Hawkeye			18'	V10-N09	Step-Sharpie Outboard Utility	image	
Hawkeye	Power	#587	18'6" x7'9"	V12-N07	Outboard Dayboat - plywood, box cutwater-keel - ref: BWAOM Ch#1, BDQ#3	image	
Hermes	Long Distance Rowing	#585	21'	V17-N23	Long Distance Rowing Cruiser		
Hesperus	Sail - 21,600 lbs displ.	#156	45' x10'6"		Cruiser - RORC racer - ref: 30oddBoats Ch#36		
His and Her Schooner	Sail 126sf	#512	19'6" x 4'3" x 3'		ref: BWAOM Ch#25, SBJ No.57 Oct87 aka Singlehand Schooner	image	link
Homebuilt Yawl	Sail w/ob		39' x 10'5" x2'	V14-N12	Multi-chine ply Bermudan centerboard cruising yawl.		
Hope	Power	#258	16' x6'4"		Lobsterboat - round-bilge planing hull - ref: SmallBoats Ch#30	image	
Houseboat Concept 38'			38'x11'1"	V11-N18		image	link
Houseboat Concept 47'	Low power	Concept	47'x11'x15"	V13-N21	Houseboat disguised as a power cruiser.		
Hrairoo	Sail - 2,500 lbs. displ.		16' x 6'6" x 1'6"		Folding Wing Keel Micro-cruiser - Dboats preface		
Iceboat	Sail				Iceboat - concept - ref: BWAOM Ch#4	image	link
Idaho	OB power	#556	31'0"x5'3"x6"		Wheelchair accessible plywood flat-bottomed cruiser. BDQ#7	image	link
Illinois	50 hp OB	#630	63'1" x 10'0"	V16-N14	Self-Propelled Houseboat "A residence" cheap giant simulated yacht		
Inboard Diesel Sport	power	#551	22'x 7	V17-N17			
Inboard Power Cruising			50'	V09-N04			
Inlet Runner	OB power	Concept	22'0"x3'5"	V14-N10	Plywood (or other sheet) rough water utility. No completed plans.	image	link
Insolent 60	sail	#666	63'0"	V19-N14	Maximum folding schooner, sleeps 6, folds to 30' on trailer	image	link
International				V11-N01	Rig Conversion		
Jack Hanna	sail	#565	29' 6"		Double-ended cruising ketch.		
Japanese Beach Cruiser	Spritsail, Cat Yawl rig	#522	3.8M x 1.8M		Plywood lapstrake, leeboards, pram bow Ref: SBJ No 68. BWAOM Ch26	image	link
Jessie Cooper	Sail - 6,150 lbs displ.	#389	25'6" x7'6"		Cruiser - minimal liveaboard - ref: 30oddBoats Ch#12	image	link
Jinni	Sloop rigged. 158sqft		19'6"x5'	V15-N19	Hard chined, double ended-family daysailer designed in June 1954.	image	
Jinni #426	123SF sprit rig cat yawl	#426	15'6" x 4'2"	V06-N17	plumb sided plywood camp cruiser		
Jochems Schooner						image	
June Bug	Rowing Sailing Tender	#400	14'x3'3"	V15-N17	Plywood box boat.	image	
Keel Canoe Yawl		#514	25'6"x7'5"	V12-N03			
Keel Canoe Yawl	Sail	#614?	15' 6"	V11-N17?	Cold-molded double-ended cruising yawl. Gaff main w/topsail.		
Keel Catboat	Cat yawl	Concept	20'0"x7'10"x2'0"		cold-molded sim. Long Micro 4 berths, 280SF sprit sail, w/7 hp inboard motor		
Keel Catboat/Cat Yawl			20'x7'10"	V13-N05			
Keel Daysailer			17'10" x 6'1"	V13-N01		image	
Keel Daysailer	Sail - 1,640 lbs displ.		18'10" x5'6"		Daysailer - gaff cat rig, round bilge - ref: BWAOM Ch#29	image	
Keel Sailing Dinghy	Sail		8' x 3'9"		Lapstrake yacht tender with long shallow keel	image	
Keel Sailing Dinghy		#427	8'x3'	V11-N09		image	
Keel Sharpie Live Aboard			55' x 9'6	V16-N06			
Keel Whaler Sloop	Sail - 2,680 lbs displ.	#396	20' x6'		Daysailer - lapstrake double-ender - ref: 30oddBoats Ch#31	image	
Keelboat	Sail - 6,600 lbs displ.		38'9" x8'		Cruiser - river keelboat representation - ref: BWAOM Ch#38	image	
Kotick	Paddle	#240	15' x1'11"		Canoe - strip-planked kayak - ref: SmallBoats Ch#13	image	link
Ladyslipper	Sail - 925 lbs. displ.	#318	7'6" x 5' x 1'11"		Keel dinghy - ref: Diff. Boat Ch#2	image	
Lake Launch, 15'6"	power	#549	15'6" x4'1"	V13-N03	Open skiff, like Sneakeasy. Surrey top, ducktails	image	link
Lake Launch, 40 ft	dual OB power	#553	40'x8'x1'1.5"	V14-N02	Plywood launch with small cabin.		
Lake Launch, steel	Power - 8,500 lbs displ.	#290	44' 11" x9'1"		Dayboat - steel - ref: 30oddBoats Ch#15		
Lapstrake Chebacco	Sail		19'6" x7'9"		Dayboat - lapstrake cat yawl - ref: BWAOM Ch#45	image	
Lapstrake Chebacco 25	Sail - 2,300 lbs displ.		25'4" x7'11"		Dayboat-cruiser - lapstrake cat yawl - ref: BWAOM Ch#45		
Lapstrake Express 22	OB	#155	22'6" x 7'8"	Texas Dory plan 16	60-100 hp single or dual outboards, lapstrake dory		
Le Dulci-Mer	Balanced Lug Sail	#457	30 ft		Plywood sailboat, wing keel ballast like Insolent 60	image	
Leeboard Catboat	Sail - 6,650 lbs displ.		21'10" x7'9"		Cruiser - cat rig - ref: BWAOM Ch#67	image	
Leeboard Yawl	sail	Concept	22'0"x7'0"x1'6"	V14-N05	Marconi rigged yawl, cold molded.		
Libboo	Power - 7,300 lbs displ.	#393	25'6" x10'		Cruiser - carvel hull - ref: 30oddBoats Ch#20		
Light Cruiser			51'6"x13'	V09-N22	V23-N20?	image	
Light Displacement Cruiser	Power - 33,600 lbs. displ.	#351	52' x15' x3'10"		Planing Hull Cruiser - ref: Diff. Boats Ch#22		
Light Dory (Type 1) Golden River	Oar	1952?	15'6" x 4'		Planked round-sided dory, early Light Dory design #140		
Light Dory (Type 2)		1961?			1961 Similar brief to round sided Golden River, but flat sided. PCB's own selfbuilt		
Light Dory (Type 3)	Oar	#140-11-	15'6"		SBJ Feb. 1980. "How to build the Gloucester Light Dory", Payson 1982.		
Light Dory (Type 4) Glouchester Gull Rowing Dory	7 ft Oar	#140-3	15'6" x 4'	Texas Dory plan 11	Gloucester Gull rowing dory, plans sold by Capt. Jim Orrell.		
Light Dory (Type 5)	oar	#265	4.74 m x 1.22 m		1973 Double-ended. Metric."Small Boats", Ch4, "Light Dory Type V" Refs: BDQ#16		
Light Dory (Type 6) Gloucester Gull	Oar	#140-6	15'6" x 4'		aka Gloucester Gull rev. Light Dory design #140 - 4 (Type 4) for Dynamite	image	link
Light Dory (Type 7))	Row	#526	19' 6" x 4'	V24-N20	Up to 3 people, 1 or 2 rowing. aka Long Light Dory, Stretched Light Dory		
Light Dory (Type 8) Three Man	rowboat	#555	23'6" x 4'	V18-N01, V24-N20	Up to 3 rowers. Largest stretch of the "Gull".	image	
Light Peapod	oars	#390	12'0"x3'8"	V13-N14	Cold-molded wooden rowboat.		
Light Power Cruiser	IB power	Concept	50'0"x9'4"x2'6"	V14-N04?	No completed design.		
Light Schooner	Sail	#395	23'6"		Open Daysailer or Camp Cruisers	image	
Lightfoot			24'x5'	V02?-N18	Schooner		
Lily	Electric Power	#627	15'4" x 4'10"	V14-N14,22;V17-N18	An Electric Picnic Launch.	image	
Lion's Paw	Sail - 15,000 lbs displ.	#404	38'9" 10'		Sharpie Cruiser - steel, leeboards - ref: 30oddBoats Ch#14	image	
Little Superior	Sail - 620 lbs displ.	#288	10'3" x5'		Dinghy - keel, lugsail - ref: FoldingSch Ch#19		
Live-On-Board Scow Schooner	sail/OB auxiliary	#501	35'0"x11'8"x1'6"	V19-N01	Leeboard scow, hard chines, commodious cabin.	image	
Lobsterboat	Power - 8,950 lbs displ.	#413	32' x11'		Fishing Launch - carvel, semi-planing - ref: 30oddBoats Ch#25	image	
Long Micro		#486	19'6"x6'	V11-N08		image	
Longship	Sail, Row		38' x8'		Open Boat - Viking ship representation - ref: BWAOM Ch#39	image	
Low Powered Outboard Cruiser	OB	#450	23'x6'10"	V15-N22			
Lun						image	link
Lynx	Sail	#255	14'8" x6'11"		Cruiser - deep keel, round bilge - ref: SmallBoats Ch#18	image	link
Madeline (Paddlin')	Pedal Power	#441	19'6" X 7' 10"	V??-N12	Sidewheeler. Pedal Power .Direct drive geometry.7 knots! 2 person	image	link
Margaret Mead	Sail		210'		cargo carrier - ref: Diff. Boats Ch#31		
Marina Cruiser	Power, Sail - 5,000 lbs		21'3" x7'10"	V17-N05	Cruiser - round bilge, lugsail - ref: BWAOM Ch#36		
Martha Jane	Sail 247sf lug rig	#510	23'6" x 6'0"	V18-N02	Boxy leeboard sharpie cruiser. Water ballast.	image	
Martha Jane Revised		#510a		V18-N03			
Master Hand	Sail	#152	22'6" x18'9"		Cruiser - Friendship sloop - ref: SmallBoats Ch#20	image	
Matsue Traveler							
Merlin (formerly Marina Cruiser)	motorsailer	#428	21'3"		Compact short-range cruiser. Flush deck. Carvel construction.	image	
Micro	Sail	#422	15'4"	V16-N16	Pocket cruiser sailboat	image	link
Micro Navigator		#422a	15'4"	V16-N16	Navigator cabin, Chinese Gaff rigged		
Microtrawler		#584	14'6x7'11	V09-N23		image	
Mikim	Power - 4,200 lbs displ.	#376	24' x7'10"		Fishing Launch - carvel hull - ref: 30oddBoats Ch#19 Also, called "Ilex"Vol.1#4 ABJ	image	
Miniature Steel Tug	Power - 5,360lbs displ.		15'11" x7'9"		Tug - box cutwater-keel - ref: BWAOM Ch#55	image	
Minimum Kayak	Power - 182 lbs displ.	#284	11'5" x1'11"		Kayak - plywood - ref: FoldingSch Ch#6	image	
Minimum Proa							
Minimum World Cruising		#635		V15-N07			
Minnesota	Twin Outboard Cruiser	#531	33' x 6'6"	V17-N08	Twin Outboard Cruiser	image	link
Minstrel III	Sail				Cruising Schooner - fisherman-type schooner - ref: 30oddBoats Ch#6		
Missouri River Keelboat		#528	38'9"x8'	V09-N11			
Moccasin	Sail - 12,200 lbs displ.	#297	36'9" x9'		Cruiser - c/b yawl - ref: FoldingSch Ch#27	image	
Moderate Speed Power		Concept	22'3" x 8'	V16-N04			
Modern Sandbagger						image	link
Modest Marina Cruiser						image	link
Monhegan	Sail - 3,300 lbs displ.	#237	18' x7'		Cruiser - Friendship sloop - ref: SmallBoats Ch#19	image	link
Morning Light 22	Sail, Power, & Oar.	#190	22'4.5" x 6'6"	Texas Dory plan 17	Sea/Surf & Rescue. July 1965. Fishing surf boat (motor well for small OB) boomless 80sf gunter rig w/36sf jib		
Mortar					See: "Brick Connecter"		
Motor Canoe	Row - 545 lbs displ.	#582	15'9" x3'	V09-N20	Dayboat - outboard, round bilge - ref: BWAOM Ch#14	image	
Motorsailing Cargo Boat	motorsailer	#610	30'0"x9'0"x2'0"		Plywood box forefoot hull with diesel inboard, cargo hold. Ref: Boatbuilder	image	
Mouser	Sail - 1,220 lbs displ.	#11-55-	16' x6'6"		Trailer- Sailer - chine catboat, SmallBoats Ch#17, BDQ#13	image	
Nahant	Sail	#242	25'6" x8'8"		Cruiser - c/b, round bilge sloop - ref: SmallBoats Ch#27	image	
Nancy Jack	Sail	#378	50' x9'11"		Plywood Cargo Carrier - ref: Diff. Boats Ch#31		
Navel Jelly	Row	#296	31' x4'3"		Disposable Racer - 'instant boat' plywood - ref: FoldingSch Ch#7	image	link
New England Fishing Vessel	160 to 200HP diesel		70'x14'x3'		Low cost/power self buildable 'economical' commercial fishing vessel		
Newfoundlander	Sail - 9,300 lbs displ.		29' x8'3"		Cruiser - deep keel, round bilge - ref: BWAOM Ch#32	image	
Nightingale	Sail	#206	25'6" x6'6" x 2'6"		Canoe Yawl Cruiser - ref: Diff. Boats Ch#19		
Nimbus	Power - 26,300 lbs. displ.	#368	34' x14' 3'5"		Displacement Hull Cruiser - ref: Diff. Boats Ch#24		
Nina	Sail - 565 lbs displ.	#196	16' x 4'		Dayboat - fibreglass - ref: SmallBoats Ch#16		
Nord Coster		#596	16'x6'6"	V14-N04?	Canoe Yawl	image	
Nymph	sail/oar	#425	7'9"x3'6"			image	
Nymph Cubed		#527	15'6" x 7'	V18-N02	Pocket Cruiser	image	
Ocean Crosser							
Ocean Racer		#127	30' x 6'10"	V10-N12	Racing Powerboat c. 1960 strip-built construction. Inboard motor 'big block		
Ocean-Crossing Rowboat	Row, Sail - 4,300 lbs		33' x6'		Rowboat - proposal - ref: FoldingSch Ch#25		
Ocean-Going Rowing Project	Row - 1,600 lbs displ.		30' x4'8"		Rowboat - round-bilge singlehander - ref: SmallBoats Ch#6		
Oceanic 30	OP	#184-11-59	30'1" x 7'2"	Texas Dory plan 18	45-80 hp dory		
Oceanic 36	I/O	#180	36' x 10'	Texas Dory plan 19	Inboard/outboard (optional extension to 39'3")		
Oceanic 45	Power	#178	45' x 10'	Texas Dory plan 20			
Odd Lot	Power - 11,000 lbs. displ.	#307	33' x 11' x 2'		Planing Hull Cruiser - ref: Diff. Boats Ch#21		
Offshore 26	Power OB	#135-7-60	26'9" x 8'1"	Texas Dory plan 22	35-100 hp OP single or twin.		
Offshore Leeboarder	Sail - 19,900 lbs displ.		39' x11'		Cruiser - cat rig - ref: BWAOM Ch#72	image	link
Old Shoe	91 SF cat yawl. 3 hp OB	#449	11'7" X 5'1" X 1'3"		200 lbs lead ballast. Day sailer with king-size bed. Tentable. Birdwatcherable.	image	link
Oldshoe	Cat Yawl		12' x 5'4"	V03-N06			
Omega	Power	#235	15m x4.6m x1.2m		Displacement Hull Cruiser - ref: Diff. Boats Ch#26		
One Man Liveaboard	One Man Liveaboard		19' x 7'6"	V16-N03			
Open Water Utility	Gas inboard power	#488	25'6"x7'6"	V18-N17	Precursor to "Shivaree", cold-molded, seats six.	image	
OSTAR Concept	sail	Concept	59'x11'x10'	V13-N11	Molded hull for ocean racing: fore and aft rudders, Ljungstrom rig.	image	
OSTAR Racer		#459	29'10"x7'10"	V10-N01		image	link
OSTAR Racer IV						image	link
Otter	Sail	#231	19'6" x4'10"		Daysailer-cruiser - leeboard plywood sharpie - ref: SmallBoats Ch#22	image	
Otter II	Sail	#375	19'6" x 5'10"		Plywood Cat Yawl Cruiser - ref: Diff. Boats Ch#13		
Out O'Gloucester 30	power	1957	30'0"x11'9"x2'5"		Carvel & cross-planked cabin cruiser. 1957-1962; approx, 200 built. Ref: BDQ#19		
Outboard cruiser	Power		36' x 10' x 1'6"		Twin Outboard Cruiser - ref: Diff. Boats Ch#12		
Outboard Powered Canal Cruiser						image	link
Outboard Utility	power	#323	21'x6'	V14-N06?		image	
Outboard Utility 23'	Outboard	#405	23'0" x 7'8"	V12-N19	Plywood utility boat, tortured ply for fine entrance lines [#40? illegible number]		
Paddling Skiff		#613	7'6"x2'	V11-N21		image	link
Palo de Agua	Sail - 12,500 lbs displ.	#373	35'4" x8'6"		Cruiser - c/b, cat rig - ref: 30oddBoats Ch#34	image	
Pari-Mutuel Schooner	Sail				Head Boat - steel 5-mast schooner - ref: FoldingSch Ch#14		
Party Fishing Boat	power	#263	50'11"x15'0"x4'0"	V13-N15	Ferrocement, 49,000 pounds	image	
Payson Pirogue	Padle - 330 lbs displ.		13' x2'4"		Canoe - plywood - ref: BWAOM Ch#3	image	link
Petty Yacht Tender	Row, Sail - 430 lbs displ.	#184	7'9" x 3'10"		Dinghy - fibreglass - ref: FoldingSch Ch#18		
Pico	Sail - 1,850 lbs displ.	#386	21.3' x6'		Daysailer - leeboard double-ender - ref: 30oddBoats Ch#32	image	
Pinky Schooner	Sail	#385	65'0"x14'0"x5'0"	V13-N20	Cold-molded over strip planking.	image	
Pirate Racer	Sail	#542	14'6" x4'		Dayboat - plywood, lateen rig - ref: BWAOM Ch#20	image	
Pirogue 12	Sail (gaff rig) 30.5 sf	#637	11'6" x 2'0" 45 lbs.	V15-N02	3 sheets of 1/2" plywood,. 6/1/97		
Pirogue 16	sail, oars, paddles	#451	16'0"x3'3"		Plywood flat-bottom boat with decks designed for cheap fast construction.		
Plain 18	power (1 or 2 OB to	#472	18' x 7'	V16-N24		image	
Plank Pipante	padled and poled	#_20	28'x4.5'		Planked replica of dugout canoe indigenous to Honduras [#?20] number illegible		
Planked Pipante			28'x4'5"	V12-N08			
Plywood 12 1/2	sail	#628	16'2"x5'8"x2'9"		Solent-rigged sloop keel daysailer designed after the Herreshoff 12 1/2. BDQ#9	image	link
Plywood Catboat		#535	15'6"x6'6"	V12-N10	(aka Cartoon 40, Casual Sailing Dinghy)		
Plywood Diesel Cruiser	Power - 3,090 lbs displ.	#574	23'6" x7'5"		Cruiser - inboard planing hull - ref: BWAOM Ch#56	image	
Plywood Trireme	Row				Cruiser - undeveloped idea - ref: FoldingSch Ch#17		
Pointer						image	link
Pointy Skiff	Power/Row	#329	10'6" x 3'6"	V17-N19	Row or small outboard (3HP)		
Poohsticks	oar	#010-ii-57	11'4" x 3'10"		Child's rowing skiff (Full details in Small Boats)	image	
Portland Skiff	Power		18' x 6'6",		Old Common Sense Designs 1996, similar to Diablo Grande		
Power Catamaran, 15'6"	Power	#598	15'6" x 6'	V12-N12			
Power Catamaran, 22'		#480	22' x 12'4"	V10-N23			
Power Yawlboat		#583	11'4" x 5'3"	V09-N15			
Prancing Pony	Sail	#208	22' x18'8"		Cruiser - deep keel, round bilge ketch - ref: SmallBoats Ch#26	image	
Prefabricated River Cruiser	OB	#684	38.7'x7.2'x1'	V13-N07	Plywood hull "State' series cruisers, many alternative superstructures & interiors.	image	
Presto Cruiser	Sail - 5,500lbs displ.		27' x6'10"		Cruiser - round bilge cat ketch - ref: BWAOM Ch#50		
Presto Gauntlet	Sail	#269			Cruiser - round-bilge hull for #267 - ref: FoldingSch Ch#12		
Prince William Sound Yawl	Sail, OB or oar auxiliary	#356	16' 3"x 4'6" 200#	V16-N23	Cold-molded cat yawl. Diff. Boats ch. 6	image	link
Proa	Sail	#217	39'6" x19'6"		Dayboat - plywood - ref: FoldingSch Ch#15	image	
Production Power Cruiser		#207	27' x 10'9"	V14-N11		image	
Providence	S & P		60+ft		Larger relation to AntiSpray, Walrus, box keel. Blue & brown water capable.		
Puffer 40	Power (1 or 2 OBs)	Concept	40'0"x14'0"x2'0"	V16-N15	Coastal cruising houseboat style after Scottish Puffer workboat, plywood box hull.	image	
Pulling Boat		#218	15'6" x 4'2"	V08-N15			
Pushmepullyou		#276	44'x7'6"	V17-N09	Two Section Cruiser	image	
Quahaug	Power - 2200 lbs. displ.	#325	15'11" x 7'6"		Inboard Launch - ref: Diff. Boats Ch#4		
Queen Mab	gaff rig cat sail, paddle	#638	84"x32"x5.25"	V14-N13	30 lbs lapstrake sailboat aka "A Small Yacht"	image	link
Queequeg	Cold Moulded Daysailer	#444	21'4"x6'6"	V10-N22		image	link
Query	Sail	#360	16' x4'6"		Plywood, Bow-steering Daysailer - ref: D Boats#30		
Quest	Power - 17,000 lbs displ.	#347	38' x11'9"		Cruiser - steel displacement hull - ref: 30oddBoats Ch#18	image	
Quickstep	Sail - 2,160 lbs displ.	#256	19'10" x5'8"		Cruiser - leeboards, round bilge - ref: SmallBoats Ch#24		
Racing Clipper Dory	sail	#194	25'6"	V19-N11	Open marconi sloop rigged boat in plywood or batten-seam.	image	
Recreational Rowboat	Row - 630 lbs displ.	#300	13'9" x4'	V18-N22	Dinghy - moulded hull - ref: FoldingSch Ch#21	image	
Red Zinger	Cat Yawl	#460	25'6x7'10	V09-N19	Cat Yawl	image	
Reiver II	Motorsailer	#621	49'2"x14'0"x2'4"		Molded hull with cabin, pilothouse, diesel inboard and dipping lug rig. Ref: BDQ#8		
Resolution	Sail - 27,000 lbs displ.	#312	48' x 11'		Houseboat - Bolger liveaboard - ref: FoldingSch Ch#32	image	
Retriever	50-100 hp OB	#631	22'	V14-N08,V16-N07	Step-sharpie fast cabin cruiser.	image	
Romp	Sail-no engine	#372	30' x 8'4"	V16-N13	Ocean cruising yawl, centerboard, cold-molded.	image	link
Rondo II	Sail - 2,000 lbs displ.	#295	39'6" x6'8"		Cruiser - plywood 3-mast schooner - ref: FoldingSch Ch#13	image	
Rose	Sail - 1,025,920 lbs displ.	#225	114' x30'		Frigate - based on 1751 ship - ref: 30oddBoats Ch#39	image	
Rose Pinnace	Row, Sail	#229	28' x6'6"		Dayboat - round bilge - ref: SmallBoats Ch#11		
Rough Water Outboard Utility	Power	#01-50	15'6"x6'0"	V13-N13	Speedboat with OB in a well—the first boat ever built from a PCB plan, in 1950.	image	link
Row/Sail Tender for Tahiti	Sail/Oar	#655	8'		punt with gaff sail & leeboard		
Rowing/Outboard Motor	oar or OB		16'0"x4'5"	V13-N10	Steam-bent framed carvel planked deckboats for use on the ship Rose Re:		
Rubens Nymph	sail, row or 2 HP	#516	7'9"x4'6"		Same length and construction as Nymph, but wider.	image	
Sailing St Pierre dory	Sail		26'10" x9'		Dory Cruiser - ref: 30oddBoats Ch#12		
Salvage I	Two Diesel inboards	#626	49'6"	V18-N14	46,500 lbs displacement steel tug yacht.	image	
Sampan Express	Power to 250 hp.	#147	22' 6" x 7' 6" x 8"		I/O Dory Skiff with cabin, 2 chine flat bottom plywood		
Sampan Express 30		#148	30 ft	Texas Dory catalogue			
Sampan/Express 17	Outboard	#188	17' x 6'6"	Texas Dory plan 23	5 panel plywood runabout, 25-75 hp outboard		
Sampan/Express 26	Power	#145-4/61	25'9" x 7'10" x 9"	Texas Dory plan 26	80-300 hp outboard or I/O single or twin		
Sampan/Express 30	Power	#148	30' x 7'10" x 9"	Texas Dory plan 27	80-300 hp outboard or I/O		
Sampan/Express 36	Power	#148x	36' x 7'10" x 9"	Texas Dory plan 27	+6 ft extension of Sampan/Express 30		
Samuel Clyde	Power - 8,000 lbs displ.	#544	31' x8'3"		Cruiser - plywood inboard-outboard - ref: BWAOM Ch#62	image	
Sandbagger							
Schooner proposal	Sail		44' x10'		Cruising Schooner - ref: 30oddBoats Ch#6		
Schooner Rigged				V11-N24			
Schorpioen	Chinese gaff sloop	#649	35'	V16-N19,20	Coastal Cruising Trimaran	image	
Schuyt Houseboat	Sail 447sf - 10 hp diesel		28'10" x 10'5"		Houseboat - leeboard double-ender - ref: BWAOM Ch#40, SBJ No.30 May83	image	
Scow Schooner	Sail - 7,700 lbs displ.		28' x9'10"		Cruiser - plywood - ref: BWAOM Ch#41		
Scow Schooner Concept			90'x28'	V11-N19			
Sea Hawk	Power	#170	38' x12'		Cruiser - carvel, semi-planing - ref: 30oddBoats Ch#24	image	
Sea Hawk, 15'6"	outboard to 20 hp.	#247	15' 6" x 4' 2"	Texas Dory catalogue	plywood dory skiff - ref: SmallBoats Ch#28, 160 lbs.		
Sea or Ski 19	outboard	#134-7-60	19'0" x 6'6"	Texas Dory plan 28	25-80 hp outboard		
Seabird '86	sail/OB auxiliary	#525	23'0"x7'9"x2'6"	V15-N09	Cabin cruiser 3 versions, Doghouse, Gaffrig, Lugrig. BDQ#15	image	link
Seaguin	Power	#232	15'6" x7'1"		Dayboat - round-bilge planing hull - ref: SmallBoats Ch#29	image	
Shadow	Power - 2,750 lbs displ.	#403	25'6"		Dayboat-camper - OMC Sea Drive - ref: 30oddBoats Ch#21	image	
Shady Lady	Power		39' x14'		Houseboat with offshore capability- steel, box keel - ref: BWAOM Ch#73	image	
Sharpie Camper Cruiser		#426	15' x 4'	V06-N17	aka Jinni		
Sharpie Catamaran Concept	sail	Concept	23'6"x12'0"	V14-N03	Cheap cat with a box cabin and a leg o' mutton rig.	image	
Sharpshooter	Power	#339	23' x5"7"		Outboard Launch - plywood, 2 versions - ref: 30oddBoats Ch#7	image	
Shearwater, 28'3"	Cat Yawl w/ sprit main		28'3		Fiberglass production, 'big sister' to Dovekie, circa 1984/5		
Shearwater, 39'6"	Sail - 5,250 lbs. displ.	#353	39'6" x 10' x 3'3"		Keel Schooner Cruiser - ref: Diff. Boats Ch#19		
Ship's Boat		#506	14'6"x4'5"	V09-N24		image	
Shivaree 16	25-50 hp OB	#518	16' x 7'	V17-N01	Center console OB utility for cold-molding, lapstrake or carvel.		
Shivaree 18/ Lobster Skiff	Power	#648	18'0"x7'0"		Molded or lapstrake center console OB. Ref: BDQ#18	image	link
Shoal Keel Daysailer	sail	Concept	24'0"x7'10"x2'0"	V13-N24	Cold-molded gaff sloop, bilge keels, cabin.		
Shoals Runner 17	Power	#189 5/65	17'3 1/2" x 6' 2 1/2"	Texas Dory plan 34	Fishing dory 9-15 hp		
Shoebox	Pram		5'6" x 3'3"	V07-N02			
Shoebox Punt	Oar	#539	5'6"x3'6"		Compact yacht tender/dingy		
Singapore Cutter	Sail/oars	#617	29'6"x7'6"	V12-N01, V18-N15	open sprit yawl designed for up to eight oars .	image	
Singlehander Cat	Sail	#523	20'			image	link
Sir Joseph Banks	Sail		95.1' x15.75'		Cargo Vessel - steel sharpie - ref: BWAOM Ch#75		
Six Gun Ship Of The Line			30'	V09-N07			
Skillygallee	Sail, w/ 6 hp to 10 hp O.B.	#416	29 ft x 7 ft x1'6"/5'3"	V14-N16	Cat Yawl, upsized Black Skimmer. 364sf sail area. Ch13 '30-Odd Boats'		
Skimmer	power 10-15 H.P.	#417	8'x4'		Poor-man's 'Boston Whaler'.	image	
Slicer	Power		29' x5'2"		Outboard Dayboat - plywood - ref: BWAOM Ch#19	image	link
Sliding Seat Bateau							
Small Auxiliary Cruising	Small Auxiliary Cruising		20'x9'	V17-N24			
Small Commercial Fishingboat		#588	19'6"x7'4"	V10-N15			
Sneakeasy	Power		26'6"		Power Sharpie	image	link
Snow Leopard	Power - 2,900 lbs displ.		28' x7'		Speedboat - concept/model boat - ref: BWAOM Ch#34		
Solution 48	Sail	#370	48' x12'8" x2'6"		Steel Hull Cruiser - ref: Diff. Boats Ch#25		
Sparkler	Sail - 1,360 lbs displ.	#409	19' x4'11"		Daysailer - c/b, plywood - ref: 30oddBoats Ch#5	image	link
Spartina	Catboat	#594	15'4"x7'	V11-N05		image	
Spartina, electric	Sail w/electric option	#594B	15' 4"		Lapstrake sailboat. Centerboard, or electric power with batteries in shoal keel.		
Special Olympics Bateau						image	link
Speed Launch		#492	29'x5'2"	V10-N05	AKA Gale		
Spur II	Utility Rowboat	#600	15'4"x4'6"	V10-N21	Rowboat - lapstrake - ref: BWAOM Ch#11, BDQ#11 500 lbs displ.	image	
Spur l (1963)	Oar - Whithall Type	#167	16'0" x 4'5"	V21-N19	Popular Boating Dec 1964 (cover story); 15Feb2004; See "Small Boats" dust		
St. Valery	Sail with OB Auxiliary	#625	7.66m x 2.1m	V15-N14	Normandy Lug Schooner in plywood lapstrake BDQ#10		
Staysail Cat	Sail - 4,000 lbs displ.		31' x6'1"		Aft-mast Daysailer - keel sharpie, no mainsail - ref: BWAOM Ch#30	image	
Steel Excursion Boat		Concept	60'x14'	V11-N06			
Steel Trawler		#409			Old Common Sense Designs catalogue		
Stone Camel	sail/IB auxiliary	#249	25'9"x7'10"x2'0"		Gaff-rigged leeboard sloop designed for GRP, after Crocker's Stone Horse. Ref:		
Storm Petrel	Sail/Outboard	#337	16'4" x 5'2"		Fixed Keel Cruiser - ref: Diff. Boats Ch#10	image	link
Striker	P		29'x7'5"	V12-N11	Early box keel steel production boats, 15Oct99, pre-Bell's Puffer		
Summer Ease	sail	#471	23' 6"	V16-N22	Hard-chine water-ballasted cat-ketch.	image	link
Summer Hen		#476			Reuben Trane (Mud hen, Marsh Hen, etc.,) commission for commercial frp		
Super Brick	Lateen rigged with OB	#559	19'6" x 7'10"	V08-N07, V10-N24	Box-hulled shanty boat, trailerable, sleeps four, enclosed head, full galley.	image	
Superbrick						image	link
Supermouse	Sail		11'6" x6'6"		Microcruiser - lapstrake pram - ref: BWAOM Ch#9	image	
Surf	Sail	#287	15'6" x3'7"		Daysailer - leeboard, plywood - ref: FoldingSch Ch#2		
Surfmaster 19	Outboard to 35 hp.	#167	19' 7" x 5' 4"	Texas Dory plan 35	2 chine plywood dory skiff 10-35 hp outboard		
Surfmaster 23	Outboard to 35 hp.	#158	23' 9 1/2" x 6'"	Texas Dory plan 35	2 chine plywood dory skiff 10-35hp outboard		
Surfmaster 27	OB	#179	27'0" x 7'6"	Texas Dory plan 36	I/O 80-260 hp V4 to V8		
Swallow	Sail - 615 lbs displ.	#392	12' x5'		Dinghy - fixed keel - ref: 30oddBoats Ch#27	image	
Swedish Cruiser	Sail - 22,700 lbs. displ.	#326	12.1m x 3.3m x 0.6m		C/b Chinese Rig Cruiser - ref: Diff. Boats Ch#20		
Sweet Pea	Row, Sail - weighs 150 lbs	#570	15' x4'4"		Dayboat - plywood surf dory sprit or sharpie rig - ref: BWAOM Ch#10	image	link
Swinging Ballast Concept	sail	Concept	23'6"x4'10"x4'6"/6"	V13-N23	Sharpie hull with laterally swinging balasted leeboards.	image	
Sybil's Yawl	outboard yawlboat pram	#507	7'6" x 3'1"	V10-N04	Was listed in 1990 era Common Sense Boats catalogue. Glued Clinker Pram		
Tahiti	Diesel Inboard	#653	38'6"	V17-N12,13,14	Ocean Passagemaker	image	link
Tahiti Design	Ocean Passagemaker	#653	38'6"	V17-N12			
Tarantula		#563	23'6x3'11"	V10-N17	Fast Keelboat	image	
Tartar		#424			Old Common Sense Designs catalogue		
Tasmanian Yawl		#447	25'6"x7'9"	V?09—N21		image	
Tasmanian Yawl?		#447	37'x11'3"	V?28-N			
Teal	Row-Sail	#310	12' X 3'6"	V16-N21	elegant small craft, 2 sheets of plywood, "Instant Boat type"	image	link
Tennessee	9.9 hp outboard	#359	29'11" x 6'2" x 5"		Power Sharpie Cruiser, 'poor man's Cigarette Boat' - ref: Diff. Boats Ch#12		
Texas Clipper 25	Sail 168sf	#195	25'6" x 6'4"	Texas Dory plan 37	racing sailing dory		
Texas Dory Express 19	Outboard	#186	19'-0"x7'0"	Texas Dory plan 24	25-75 hp outboard		
Thomastown Galley	R, S, P - 810 lbs displ.	#215	15'6" x4'1"		Dayboat - plywood - ref: SmallBoats Ch#8	image	link
Three-metre Multihull	Sail		10' x7'10"		Daysailer - minimal trimaran - ref: BWAOM Ch#8		
Tiger Lilly	Power - 9,200 lbs displ.		45' x10'3"		Cruiser - plywood, planing hull - ref: FoldingSch Ch#16		
Tiny Cat (or Bobcat)	sail 110sf- 690 lbs displ.	#470	12'3" x 6'		Tack & tape plywood Catboat homebuilt 'Beetle Cat': SBJ No.40 Jan85 Cartoon#16	image	link
Titania	Sail - 21,700 lbs displ.	#402	50' x10'10"		Cruiser - bilgeboard schooner - ref: 30oddBoats Ch#37	image	
Titmouse	Sailing Training Dinghy		11'x5'	V13-N17		image	link
Tonweya	Sail - 31,600 lbs displ.	#380	50' x13'		Cruiser - c/b, Chinese rig - ref: 30oddBoats Ch#38	image	
Topaz	Power, Trailerable	#650	31'1" x 7'4"	V16-N05,V19-N03	Elegant, trailerable, light, planing power cruiser with glass house	image	
Topaz Spyder	Power	#650-2	31'4"x7'9"	V19-N04	Modification of "Topaz", open utility OB cruiser.	image	link
Tortoise	Sailing Pram	#363	6'8 x 3'8	V16-N15	2 sheets of 1/4" plywood, Lateen rigged	image	
Toy Riverboat	Power	#272	20'5" x8'		Dayboat - plywood sidewheeler - ref: FoldingSch Ch#8		
Trailer Cruising Cat/Yawl	sail, OB auxiliary	Concept	28'0"x7'4"x6"	V13-N06	Molded fiberglass for Florida Bay Boats—failed design.	image	
Trailerable Yawl		#564	23'5"x7'6"	V10-N06		image	
Translucent Tender		#442	8 '	V09-N03			
Trashcat	Low power outboard, e.g.		15'6" x 8' x 7"		Ply SOP sharpie hulls.ref MAIB 15Dec2005		
Tri Tarantula	Sail		23'6" x16'		Daysailer - plywood trimaran - ref: BWAOM Ch#31		
Triad	Sail	#336	50'10" x7'10" x1'4"		Plywood Ketch Cruiser - ref: Diff. Boats Ch#29		
Triple-keel Sloop	Sail - 3,800 lbs. displ.	#320	22'0" x 7'4" x 1'6"		Cruiser - ref: Diff. Boat Ch#9		
Ultralight Cruiser	Power - 20,000 lbs. displ.	#374	15.75m 3.6m		Planing Hull Cruiser - ref: Diff. Boats Ch#23		
Ultra-light rowboat for homebuilders	oar	Cartoon #5	15' x 3'10"		30-35 lbs plywood lapstrake w/truss frames dbl ended rowboat, SBJ magazine.		
Unpretentious Cabin Cruiser		#578	33'x10'	V09-N10			
Utility for Homebuilders	Power	#305	22' x7'6"		Mini-cruiser - plywood, inboard - ref: FoldingSch Ch#9		
Utility Nesting Skiff	Rowboat	Concept	11'6"x4'2"	V13-N19	Rowboats designed to stack inside each other.	image	
Vanitie	Sail - 1,210 lbs displ.	#253	19'8" x15'		Daysailer - keel sloop - ref: SmallBoats Ch#21		
Variation on a Folkboat			25'8" x 7'3"	V16-N02			
Vectis	Sail	#309	5m x2.37m		Cruiser - Itchen cutter - ref: FoldingSch Ch#20		
Victoria	Row - 800 lbs displ.	#210	15'6" x4'2"	V08-N15	Rowboat - round-bilge wooden hull - ref: SmallBoats Ch#5 Ref:	image	
Viking Longship		#572	38'	V09-N05			
Viper	Power	#358	20'2" x3'8"		Inboard Launch - plywood - ref: 30oddBoats Ch#8	image	
Volunteer	Sail - 13,900 lbs displ.		35' x8'11"		Cruiser - leeboard cat yawl - ref: BWAOM Ch#65	image	
Walrus			60'x 13'		Chinese Gaff 1,881 SqFt. Jib 323, Twin Diesel auxiliary.		
Watervan	OB power	#632	22.7'x8.07'	V14-N09	Maximum Interior Volume 22' Cruiser	image	
Weekender Schooner		#239	39'4"x10'	V10-N11		image	
Weston Martyr	Sail, w/10 hp to 25 hp O.B.	#487	45' x 6'9"	V13-N18?	narrow enough for English canal locks. 421sf Dipping Lug on tabernacle mast	image	link
Whaler	sail/IB auxiliary		48'0"x11'0"x2'6"		Thames barge-type keel sloop Canard sail. Ref: BDQ#21	image	
Whaler ketch	Sail - 6,100 lbs. displ.	#369	28'9" x 7'0" x 2'3"		C/b Or Leeboard Cruiser - ref: Diff. Boats Ch#14		
Whalewatcher	Sail	#561	29'		Upsized birdwatcher type boat. Ref: BDQ#2	image	link
William D. Jochems	sail	#639	25'6"x7'1"	V14-N20	Family Schooner	image	
Willow		#464	30'x8'6	V09-N12	Leeboard Sloop		
Windermere	power	#633	31'		2 person, coastal, livaboard, trailerable cruiser	image	link
Windfola	Sail - 1,835 lbs displ.	#311	21' x7'		Dayboat - lapstrake yawl - ref: FoldingSch Ch#23	image	link
Windsprint	sail	#381	16'x4'6"		daysailer, Instantboat	image	
Wish II	Sail - 2,170 lbs displ.	#399	20' x6'6"		Micro-cruiser - plywood leeboard cat yawl - ref: 30oddBoats Ch#11	image	
Wisp	Sail - 685 lbs displ.	#411	20' x4'	V18-N18	Beach Cruiser - bilgeboards, canoe hull - ref: 30-Odd Boats Ch#30;	image	link
Wolf Pack						image	link
Wolf Trap	Sail - 6,600 lbs. displ.	#366	30' x10' x2'		Cat Yawl Cruiser - ref: Diff. Boats Ch#18	image	
Work Skiff		#618u	15'	V16-N21			
Work Skiff 15	power (OB)	#618	15'6"x4'1"	V12-N06		image	
Wyoming	Power	#520	51'6" x8'3"	V18-N06	Cruiser - giant plywood sharpie - ref: BWAOM Ch#66;	image	
Yacht Tender		#498	11'6"x3'6"	V12-N13		image	
Yamato Fishing Launch		#511	25'x6'	V11-N11			
Yarrow	Sail - 1,390 lbs displ.	#233	16'1" x12'11"		Daysailer - deep keel, round bilge - ref: SmallBoats Ch#25	image	
Yellow Leaf	Paddle - 470 lbs displ.	#257	15'6" x3'		Canoe - stitch & glue plywood - ref: SmallBoats Ch#12	image	
Yonder	865sf Chinese Cat Yawl	#665	30'4"x10'0"x2'0"		'Two-Some, Long Range Yawl', steel plate ballast shoe	image	link
Yorkhaven	Power - 8,500 lbs displ.	#278	30'2" x11'3"		Dayboat/ Trawler Yacht - two versions - ref: 30oddBoats Ch#23	image	
Zephyr	Sail	#316	20'9"		Double ended Camp Cruiser	image	link

== Bibliography ==
- Bolger, Philip C. (1973). Small Boats. Camden, ME: International Marine. ISBN 0-87742-036-X.
- Bolger, Philip C. (1976). The Folding Schooner, and Other Adventures in Boat Design. Camden, ME: International Marine. ISBN 0-87742-083-1.
- Bolger, Philip C. (1980). Different Boats. Camden, ME: International Marine. ISBN 0-87742-134-X.
- Bolger, Philip C. (1982). Thirty Odd Boats. Camden, ME: International Marine. ISBN 0-87742-152-8.
- Bolger, Philip C. (1983). Bolger Boats. Camden, ME: International Marine. ISBN 0-87742-168-4.
- Bolger, Philip C. (1986). Schorpioen: A Novel of Southern Africa. Camden, ME: International Marine. ISBN 0-941997-00-6.
- Bolger, Philip C. (1994). Boats with an Open Mind. Camden, ME: International Marine/Ragged Mountain Press. ISBN 0-07-006376-1.
- Bolger, Philip C. (1998). 103 Sailing Rigs "Straight Talk". Gloucester, ME: Phil Bolger & Friends, Inc. ISBN 0-9666995-0-5.
