= Merv Bolger =

Australian rules footballer, born 1919

Personal information
- Full name: Mervyn Leslie Lawrence Bulger
- Born: 14 June 1919; Broken Hill
- Died: 16 September 1993 (aged 74); South Australia
- Height: 166 cm (5 ft 5 in)
- Weight: 66 kg (146 lb)

Playing career^{1}
Years	Club	Games (Goals)
1940	North Melbourne	3 (0)
- ^{1} Playing statistics correct to the end of 1940.

Mervyn Leslie Lawrence Bolger (14 June 1919 – 16 September 1993) was an Australian rules footballer who played with North Melbourne in the Victorian Football League (VFL).

Bulger later served in the Royal Australian Air Force during World War II.
