= Clonamery Church =

- Cill Chluain Iomaire
- Location within Ireland
- 52.466944°N 7.031667°W
- Location: Clonamery, Inistioge, County Kilkenny
- Country: Ireland
- Denomination: Church of Ireland
- Previous denomination: Pre-Reformation Catholic

Architecture
- Functional status: inactive
- Style: Celtic Christianity
- Years built: 9th or 10th century

Specifications
- Length: 23 m (75 ft)
- Width: 10 m (33 ft)
- Materials: stone

Administration
- Diocese: Ossory

National monument of Ireland
- Official name: Clonamery Church
- Reference no.: 77

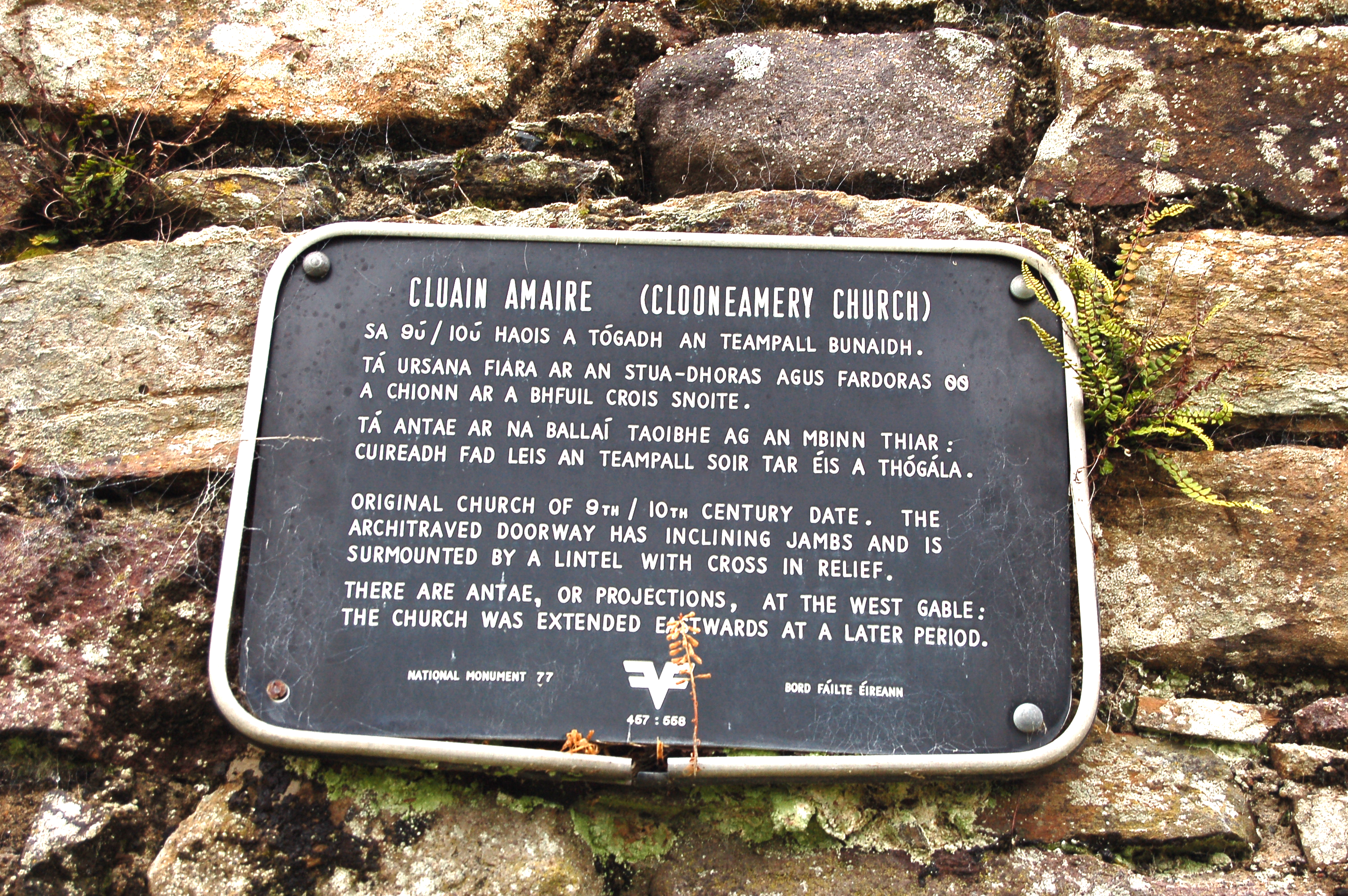
Cloneamery Church plaque in Irish Gaelic and English

Clonamery Church is a medieval church and National Monument in County Kilkenny, Ireland.

== Location ==
Clonamery Church is located 3 km (1.9 mi) southeast of Inistioge, on the north bank of the River Nore.

== History ==
St Broonahawn (pattern day 16 May) founded a monastery at Clonamery. The present church was built in the 9th or 10th century.

The Romanesque chancel was added in the 12th century, while the out-building (sacristy) be 15th/16th century, and a bell-cote was added at the same time.

Tradition states that the church continued in use until 1691, when Edward Fitzgerald of Cloone Castle died at the Battle of Aughrim.

== Church ==
Clonamery is a nave-and-chancel church with a sacristy built of roughly dressed stones not laid in regular courses with a slight batter. There is a flat-headed west doorway with a cross pattée above the lintel and antae in the west gable. The bell-cote had room for two bells: a sanctus bell and a bell for calling the people to prayer. At the doorway a Maltese cross with lines in relief extends down both sides of the doorway.

A pillar-stone of early date was found at Clonamery. It is made of greenish slate and bears three crosses and two cup marks. There are some cross slabs and a grave slab also.
