= The Roebuck =

Pub in Southwark, London

Coordinates: 51.498070°N 0.090617°W

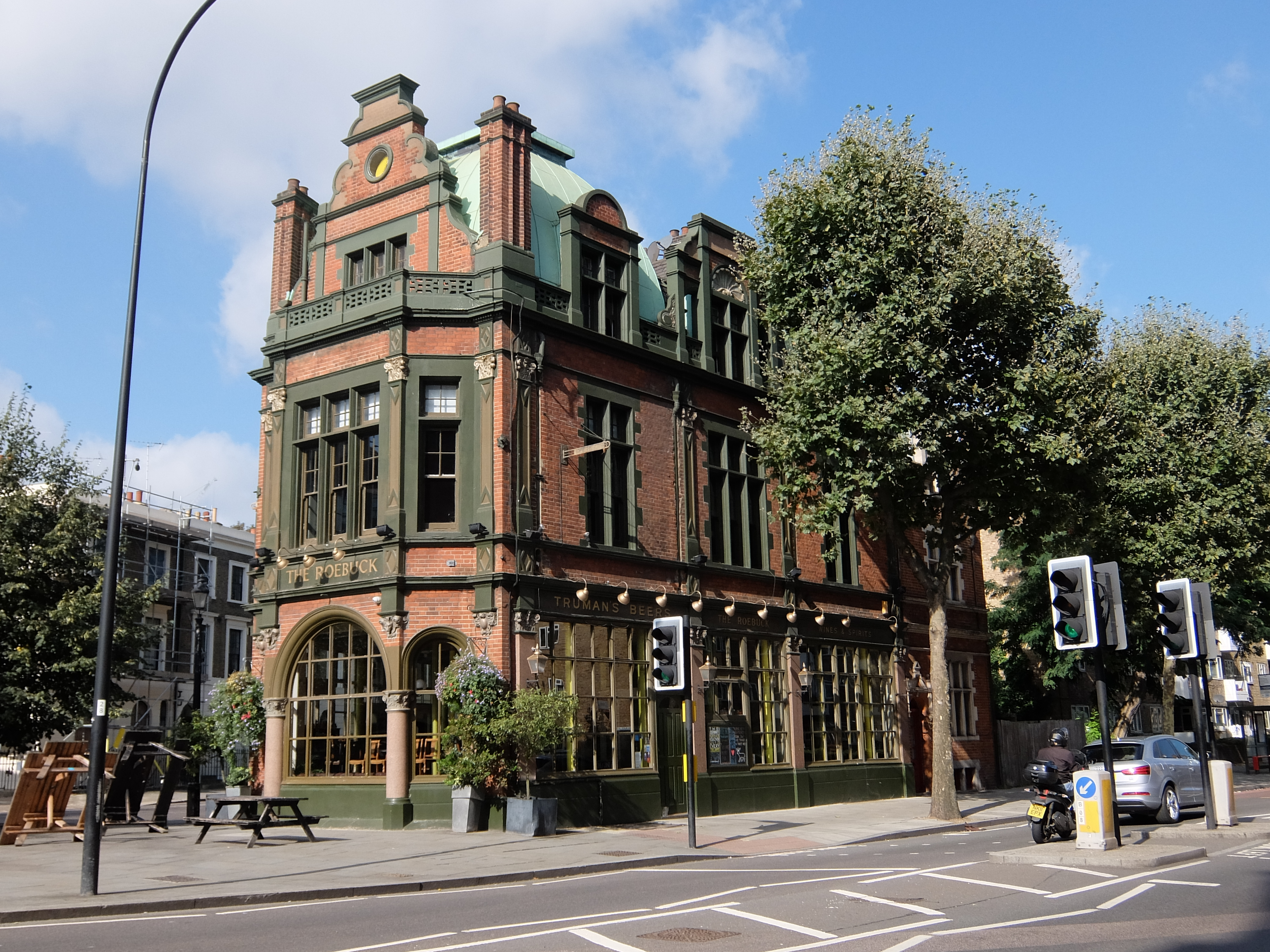
The Roebuck

The Roebuck is a Grade II listed public house at 50 Great Dover Street, Southwark, London SE1 4YG.

It was rebuilt circa 1892.

An 1825 image of the previous building at the turnpike shows a sculpture of a buck on the facade.

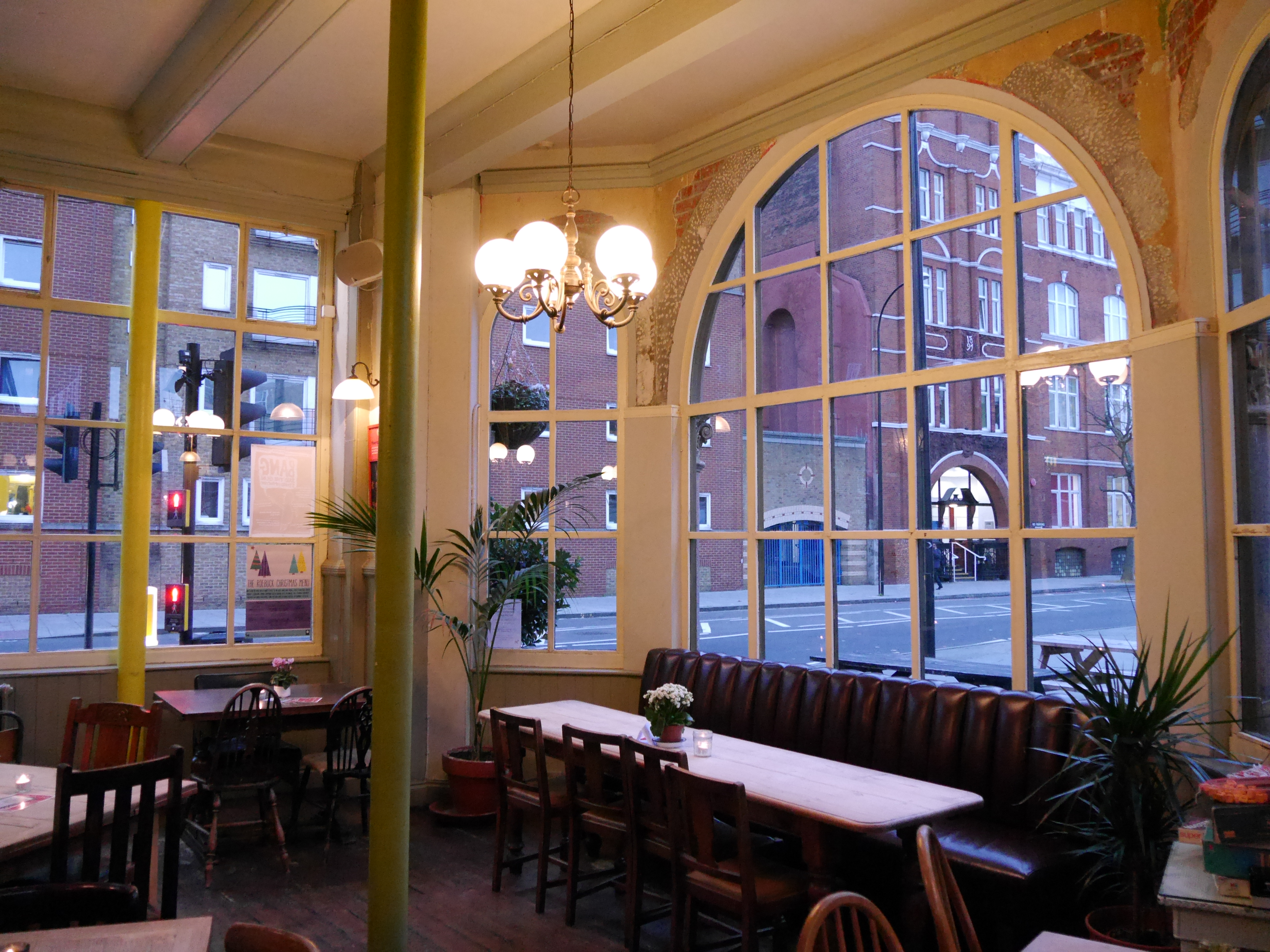
Interior of the Roebuck
