= Laurie Bolger =

English poet

- Bolger in 2024
- Born: July 10, 1989 (age 37); London W10
- Education: Bath Spa University; Mary Immaculate College
- Writing career
- Genre: Poetry
- Notable works: Lady (Nine Arches, 2025)

Laurie Bolger (born Lauren Bolger, 10 July 1989) is an English poet, stand-up and presenter based in London. In 2014 she was shortlisted for Young Poet Laureate of London. She currently tours her writing including her debut pamphlet collection Box Rooms, published by Burning Eye and one woman show Talking to Strangers as well as hosting Bang Said the Gun.

Bolger has performed at venues such as The Royal Albert Hall, Old Vic Theatre and St Paul's Cathedral as well as being Poet in Residence in various public spaces such as libraries, community centres, pubs and the Queen Elizabeth's Olympic Park.

== Early life ==
Bolger was born in London W10 and spent much of her school years on the South Coast of England with her parents and younger sister.

Bolger attended Bath Spa University to study Creative Arts and Mary Immaculate College, Limerick to study English and Irish Literature.

== Career ==
Bolger began to perform her poetry after leaving university where she toured with a punk band speaking poems at the start of gigs. She then went onto before at various events starting with Bath Lit Fest. Since then she has received national airplay on the BBC Radio 1, 1Xtra and BBC Radio 3's The Verb.

Laurie was shortlisted for Young Poet Laureate of London, performing at major London venues and has also performed at festivals across the UK including Glastonbury, Camden Lock Live Festival & Lovebox, Camp Bestival, Citadel, Cheltenham Lit Fest, Kaleidoscope Festival, and Oxford Festival of the Arts. In 2014 she performed as part of the Edinburgh International Book Festival as part of Pagematch.

Bolger was part of the Voices Nationwide Campaign in 2017 featuring young and promising performance poets from the UK. She has also written for many major brands, campaigns and independent businesses globally since 2014 and was involved in the Belfast Poetry Competition, officially opened by Nationwide in 2017.

Her debut collection Box Rooms was published by Burning Eye and launched at an event at The Roebuck, South London. It includes the poems Carrot Mash, Tea and Bill Bailey, Public House and Slippers. Bolger has recently started in the world of Stand-Up.

Bolger has also worked in radio, presenting the award-winning Round @ Laurie's on Roundhouse Radio between 2014 - 2016.

Bolger has frequently worked with the Apples and Snakes poetry organisation.

== Awards ==
- 2014 - Shortlisted for the Young Poet Laureate of London
- 2015 - Won both Best Presenter and Sound of The Roundhouse for her radio show Round @ Laurie's judged by Gemma Cairney and Roundhouse
- 2023 - Won The Moth Poetry Prize with her poem 'The Parkland Walk'. This poem was also Highly Commended in the Forward Prizes for Poetry
- 2024 - Poetry Business Poetry Pamphlet Award for'Spin'

== Publications ==
- Makeover: Poems (The Emma Press Poetry Pamphlets)
- Lady (Nine Arches, 2025)
- Spin (Poetry Business 2024)
- Box Rooms
- Verse Matters
- The Best Poetry Book in the World
