= Trump v. Barbara =

2026 United States Supreme Court case

- Supreme Court of the United States

Argued April 1, 2026 Decided June 30, 2026
- Full case name: Donald J. Trump, President of the United States, et al., Petitioners v. Barbara, et al.
- Docket no.: 25-365
- Decision: Opinion

Case history
- Prior: Petitioners' Motion for Classwide Preliminary Injunction granted. Barbara v. Trump, No. 25-cv-00244 (D.N.H. July 10, 2025).; Notice of appeal filed. No. 25-1861 (1st Cir. September 5, 2025).; Cert. before judgment granted. 607 U.S. 1079 (2025).

Questions presented
- Whether Executive Order No. 14,160 complies on its face with the Citizenship Clause and with 8 U.S.C. 1401(a), which codifies that Clause.

Holding
- People born in the United States to parents unlawfully or temporarily present are "subject to the jurisdiction" of the United States and are citizens at birth under the Fourteenth Amendment's Citizenship Clause.

Court membership
- Chief Justice John Roberts Associate Justices Clarence Thomas · Samuel Alito; Sonia Sotomayor · Elena Kagan; Neil Gorsuch · Brett Kavanaugh; Amy Coney Barrett · Ketanji Brown Jackson

Case opinions
- Majority: Roberts, joined by Sotomayor, Kagan, Barrett, Jackson
- Concurrence: Jackson, joined by Sotomayor (Introduction and Part I)
- Concur/dissent: Kavanaugh (in judgment)
- Dissent: Thomas, joined by Gorsuch
- Dissent: Alito
- Dissent: Gorsuch

Laws applied
- U.S. Const. amend. XIV, § 1, cl. 1

Trump v. Barbara, 609 U.S. ___ (2026) is a landmark decision of the Supreme Court of the United States, which held that children born in the United States, including to parents unlawfully or temporarily present, are "subject to the jurisdiction" of the United States and are citizens at birth under the Citizenship Clause of the Fourteenth Amendment to the United States Constitution (1868). The Court invalidated President Donald Trump's Executive Order 14160 (2025), which would have effectively denied birthright citizenship to U.S.-born children whose parents lacked U.S. citizenship or permanent residency.

In the 6–3 ruling, Chief Justice John Roberts and Justices Sonia Sotomayor, Elena Kagan, Amy Coney Barrett, and Ketanji Brown Jackson agreed, and Brett Kavanaugh agreed in part, to strike down the executive order. The Court split 5–4 on the executive order's constitutionality, with Roberts writing for the majority that the Fourteenth Amendment guarantees birthright citizenship to nearly everyone born on U.S. soil and Kavanaugh concurring based on statute. Justices Clarence Thomas, Samuel Alito, and Neil Gorsuch dissented, arguing that the executive order was not inconsistent with the Fourteenth Amendment.

The case arose when a federal district court in New Hampshire certified a nationwide class of children affected by the executive order and issued a class-wide preliminary injunction preventing its enforcement, a remedy shaped by Trump v. CASA, Inc. (2025). The Supreme Court granted the Trump administration's request for certiorari before judgment to resolve the constitutional question directly. Barbara led headlines and was regarded as one of the most high-stakes tests of the scope of the Citizenship Clause since the decision in United States v. Wong Kim Ark (1898), which both sides cited as precedent and which discussed the domicile of Wong Kim Ark's parents.

The Court rejected the administration's argument that precedent limited birthright citizenship to children of U.S.-domiciled parents, holding that Wong Kim Ark's discussion of domicile described the case's facts without limiting the constitutional requirement. It also rejected the argument that the Fourteenth Amendment's ratifiers intended such a limitation. Drawing on English common law and precedent including Lynch v. Clarke (1844), it reaffirmed the long prevailing understanding of the Citizenship Clause. It confirmed that neither the president by executive order nor Congress by statute may deny citizenship at birth to persons recognized as citizens by the Fourteenth Amendment, leaving broad changes to birthright citizenship to the constitutional amendment process.

== Background ==
=== Citizenship Clause ===
The Supreme Court ruled in Dred Scott v. Sandford (1857) that people of African descent, including descendants of enslaved people, could not be citizens of the United States. To repudiate Dred Scott, Congress and U.S. states constitutionalized the issue in the Citizenship Clause of the Fourteenth Amendment to the United States Constitution (1868): "All persons born or naturalized in the United States, and subject to the jurisdiction thereof, are citizens of the United States and of the State wherein they reside."

In United States v. Wong Kim Ark (1898), the Supreme Court held that a child born in the United States to noncitizen parents domiciled there was a citizen at birth, subject to narrow recognized exceptions such as children of foreign diplomats and members of tribal nations.

=== Modern interpretations ===
Debate stirred over the meaning of the Citizenship Clause, even among mostly originalist scholars. Defending a broad reading, Michael D. Ramsey, Keith Whittington (with James Heilpern), Akhil Reed Amar, Vikram Amar (with Jason Mazzone), and (initially) James Ho argued that the clause granted citizenship to almost anyone born on American soil. Narrow readings by Kurt Lash or (differently) by Ilan Wurman (with Randy Barnett) argued that "subject to the jurisdiction thereof" required an allegiance or domicile unmet by temporary, unlawful presence.

=== Executive Order 14160 ===
As promised in his 2024 presidential campaign, President Donald Trump's second administration cracked down on immigration, partly by ordering federal executive departments not to recognize the U.S. citizenship of children born in the U.S. to illegal immigrants or travel visa holders (Executive Order 14160, "Protecting the Meaning and Value of American Citizenship"):

Sec. 2. Policy. (a) It is the policy of the United States that no department or agency of the United States government shall issue documents recognizing United States citizenship, or accept documents issued by State, local, or other governments or authorities purporting to recognize United States citizenship, to persons: (1) when that person's mother was unlawfully present in the United States and the person's father was not a United States citizen or lawful permanent resident at the time of said person's birth, or (2) when that person's mother's presence in the United States was lawful but temporary, and the person's father was not a United States citizen or lawful permanent resident at the time of said person's birth.

=== Initial litigation ===
In San Francisco, where the U.S.-born Wong Kim Ark had sued the government for recognition of his citizenship after being detained under the Chinese Exclusion Act of 1882 and where Chinese and Chinese Americans organized against the executive order, City Attorney David Chiu was concerned that the order "would create a permanent generation of folks who have never lived anywhere else but are considered undocumented". He stood with Wong's great-grandson, a cook, who criticized the executive order as divisive.

The government asserted that the executive order ended birthright citizenship and related benefits for the U.S.-born children of undocumented immigrants, an issue that President Trump and his supporters viewed as critically important. Legal commentators widely considered birthright citizenship settled law under longstanding precedent. The executive order aimed to test that understanding in court and risked the birthright citizenship of about 250,000 U.S.-born children annually, including some 150,000 annually whose parents were not legal permanent residents.

==== Trump v. CASA ====
Many district court judges quickly blocked the order by issuing universal injunctions, including Judge Deborah Boardman, who said "no court in the country has ever endorsed the president's interpretation. This court will not be the first." These cases were consolidated into Trump v. CASA, Inc. (2025). The Trump administration asked the US Supreme Court to limit the injunctions to the plaintiffs who were suing against the order. On June 27, 2025, the Supreme Court ruled 6–3 that federal district courts generally cannot issue nationwide injunctions, avoiding the underlying birthright citizenship question. Justice Brett Kavanaugh appeared to endorse class-wide injunctions in his concurring opinion.

==== Barbara v. Trump ====
The day of the court's ruling in Trump v. CASA, the American Civil Liberties Union, seeing a class action as the best means to challenge the order, filed Barbara v. Trump, asking the United States District Court for the District of New Hampshire to grant a class-wide injunction covering those who would not qualify for birthright citizenship under the executive order. The representative plaintiff, Barbara, a Honduran citizen, is only known by her first name because she fears for her and her family's safety. CASA de Maryland filed a similar motion as well. On July 10, 2025, Judge Joseph Laplante granted the ACLU's request, certified a class of born and unborn babies who would be deprived of their citizenship per the administration's policy, and issued a preliminary injunction blocking the order from being enforced upon that class.

==== Washington v. Trump ====
A separate case, Washington v. Trump (2025), that had been consolidated with Trump v. CASA at the Supreme Court and similarly had its nationwide injunction lifted, was heard in full in June 2025 by the United States Court of Appeals for the Ninth Circuit. On July 23, 2025, that court ruled that Trump's executive order was unconstitutional, the first appeals court to reach this finding, and deemed that this case necessitated a national injunction based on the Supreme Court's limited exceptions outlined in CASA. Though the administration had also petitioned this decision to the Supreme Court, it had not been picked up along with Barbara.

== Supreme Court ==
The Trump administration petitioned the Supreme Court in September 2025, challenging the district court's injunction in Barbara and asserting high stakes. In December 2025, the Supreme Court granted certiorari before judgment as permitted by its procedures "upon a showing that the case is of such imperative public importance as to justify deviation from normal appellate practice and to require immediate determination". The question was "whether the Executive Order complies on its face with the Citizenship Clause and with 8 U.S.C. § 1401(a), which codifies that Clause."

Writing for the American Bar Association, legal scholar Steven D. Schwinn described the legal change that could be effected by a ruling in the government's favor as "seismic" but expected the government to face an uphill battle, given the Court's emphasis on "history, tradition, and original understanding." Legal scholar Michael C. Dorf also expected the executive order to be struck down but cautioned that the Roberts Court seemed unpredictable. Puzzled by the Court's granting of certiorari, he speculated on possible explanations (e.g., justices' interest, institutional caution, nonpartisanship signaling).

=== Amicus briefs ===
==== For petitioners ====
Eighteen amici curiae were filed in support of President Trump, including New York University law professor Richard Epstein, legal scholars Hans von Spakovsky and Ilan Wurman, Senators Ted Cruz and Eric Schmitt, Representatives Claudia Tenney, Chip Roy, and 27 other Republican members of Congress, Gun Owners of America, the organization Citizens United, and the Conservative Legal Defense and Education Fund, the Republican attorneys general of 25 U.S. states and Guam, and the Federation for American Immigration Reform.

==== For respondents ====
After the class respondents filed their brief on February 19, 2026, they were joined in condemnation of the order by briefs in 42 amici curiae from across the legal profession, civil rights groups, and others. Organizations writing in response included the National Association for the Advancement of Colored People (NAACP), the League of Women Voters, and the National Urban League, as well as more than 200 other immigrants' rights, legal defense, civil rights, veterans' rights nonprofits and organizations, 19 labor unions, hundreds of legal scholars and professors, and scholars on migration, sociology, economics, and political science.

Support also came from elected officials, including 217 Democratic members of Congress, more than 130 state and local governments and dozens of current and former judges, and over a dozen "former White House lawyers, senior government officials, federal judges, governors, and members of Congress who were appointed or nominated by Republican presidents, or who were elected as Republicans."

=== Oral arguments ===
Oral arguments were heard on April 1, 2026. Trump attended a portion of the session, the first time any sitting president had done so. Fox News viewed this as a sign of Barbara's importance to him and its nature as a "landmark case, which could upend more than 100 years of precedent that has allowed most babies born in the U.S. to receive automatic citizenship." John Eastman, a legal scholar better known for arguments against birthright citizenship before his role in attempts to overturn the 2020 United States presidential election, also attended.

Justices did not acknowledge Trump, who sat calmly in the front row of the public gallery. Parents of children in the plaintiff class did not attend. U.S. solicitor general D. John Sauer spoke about twice as much as the ACLU's Cecillia Wang. Questioning was mild but skeptical of Sauer's arguments, as Trump heard. Arguments centered on historical understandings of the Fourteenth Amendment, including precedent like Wong Kim Ark, which Wang said controlled the case. Among the disagreements were whether factual references to "domicile" in that case were also relevant to the reasoning.

==== Sauer's argument ====
Justice Sotomayor said of Sauer that "you are asking us to overrule Wong Kim Ark." Sauer responded that he was not and argued that he was only asking the Court to narrow it, claiming that it only decided permanent lawful residents due to its use of the word "domicile" (Note: In concurrent congressional hearings, experts advocated for the same.) and that it supported Trump's order. Justice Gorsuch replied, "Well, I'm not sure how much you want to rely on Wong Kim Ark."

Sauer argued that the Citizenship Clause required both U.S. birth and being "subject to the jurisdiction" of the U.S., which he interpreted as requiring primary national allegiance. Citing historical practice, the Civil Rights Act of 1866, and precedent, he argued that citizenship had traditionally depended on allegiance and permanent lawful domicile. Because parents who are only temporarily or unlawfully present lack permanent lawful domicile and sufficient allegiance, he concluded, their U.S.-born children would not automatically be citizens.

"[Y]ou're taking ... a revisionist [position] with respect to a substantial part of our history", Justice Kagan said. Like Justices Gorsuch and Jackson, she questioned these arguments' textualism. Sauer never mentioned the Lincoln administration, though Justice Thomas asked him to start with Dred Scott. He did, however, argue textually that the Fourteenth Amendment was only intended for newly emancipated slaves and their children, citing late nineteenth-century attorneys Alexander Porter Morse, Francis Wharton, and George D. Collins, who interpreted the Fourteenth Amendment narrowly.

Sauer cited Elk v. Wilkins (1884), which held that Native American children born on Indian reservations with tribal sovereignty were ineligible for birthright citizenship, as they were equivalent to "the children of subjects of any foreign government born within the domain of that government". (Note: The Indian Citizenship Act (1924) codified their birthright citizenship.) Justice Sotomayor asked him about United States ex rel. Hintopoulos v. Shaughnessy (1957), in which the Court had reasoned that "of course" a child of illegal aliens was "an American citizen at birth". She also asked about the executive order's possible retrospective application.

Sauer claimed that birthright citizenship "spawned a sprawling industry of birth tourism" and that people from enemy nations "flocked to give birth" in the U.S., yet when Chief Justice Roberts asked him about the prevalence of birth tourism, Sauer answered that "no one knows for sure." Eventually, he gave a large figure, to which Roberts replied: "Having said all that, you do agree that that has no impact on the legal analysis before us?" Justice Kavanaugh also seemed to consider these words more relevant to public policy than judicial interpretation. Sauer argued "we're in a new world now ... where 8 billion people are one plane ride away" from having a U.S. citizen child. Roberts replied, "well, it's a new world. It's the same Constitution". The exchange was viewed as a blow to Sauer's argument.

==== Wang's argument ====
Wang argued that the Fourteenth Amendment guaranteed citizenship to everyone born in the U.S. with narrow and sometimes historical exceptions (e.g., children of diplomats, foreign ships, enemy forces). Citing English common law, the Amendment's history, and precedent, she argued that "subject to the jurisdiction" referred to geographic jurisdiction, not parental allegiance or lawful domicile, that Wong Kim Ark rejected a domicile requirement, that birthright citizenship does not depend on a parent's legal immigration status or intent, and that Sauer's interpretation contradicted the Amendment's purpose.

Justice Alito asked whether the Fourteenth Amendment and the Civil Rights Act of 1866 use the same citizenship test to confront Wang with a possible inconsistency in her argument, but Justice Kavanaugh pointed out that the two laws have different texts, suggesting they may also have different meanings. Justice Barrett's questioning closely tracked Wang's core argument, suggesting that cases like Indian tribes, occupying armies, and foundlings were not exceptions to birthright citizenship so much as situations outside its scope.

President Trump left during Wang's arguments. If only for practical, administrative reasons, the Court seemed likely to rule against him. Justice Kavanaugh first suggested doing so via Wong Kim Ark as Fourteenth Amendment precedent. Then he raised the doctrine of constitutional avoidance and said that the decision could rest narrowly on statute (the Immigration and Nationality Act of 1952) granting birthright citizenship. Wang agreed to either basis, but Sauer favored the latter as avoiding broad constitutionalization and facilitating new laws.

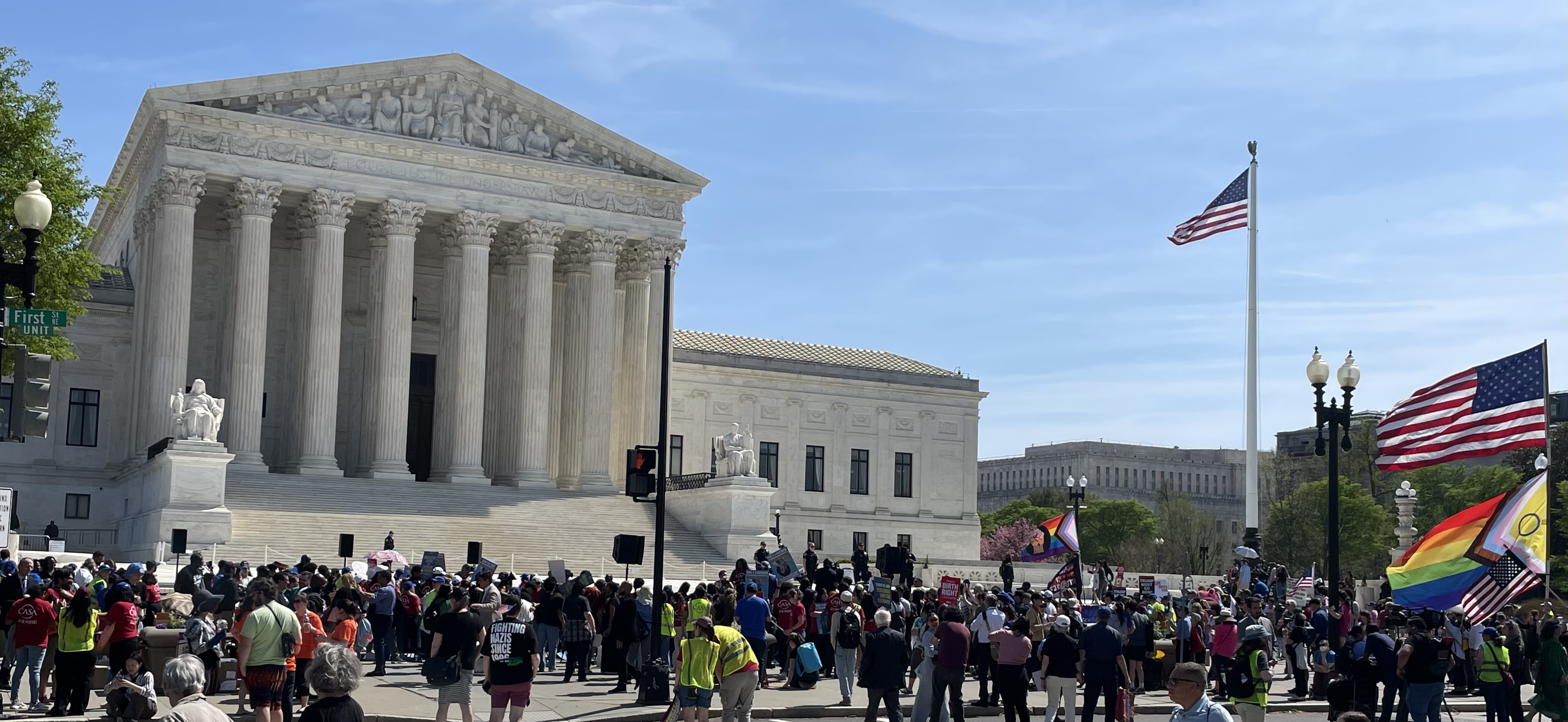
Protests outside the Supreme Court building on April 1, 2026, after arguments were presented in the case

An hour after leaving, Trump posted on social media: "We are the only Country in the World STUPID enough to allow 'Birthright' Citizenship!" (Note: In response to an earlier tariffs ruling, he had insulted Justices Barrett and Gorsuch.) Trump's assertion was incorrect since, at that time, over 30 other countries offered birthright citizenship unconditionally, including most of the Americas.

=== Decision ===
On June 30, 2026, the Supreme Court ruled against President Trump, voiding the executive order, in a 6–3 decision, within which there was a 5–4 split on the constitutionality of the order. Three views emerged on birthright citizenship: the majority held that it was broadly granted by birthplace and sovereign authority under the Fourteenth Amendment, Kavanaugh blocked Trump's order as inconsistent with statute without endorsing the majority's sweeping rule, and dissenters held forth at length on historical counter-narratives, centering their concerns around allegiance. The majority distinctly stressed common law and the dissents immigration, and both cited many precedents beyond Wong Kim Ark, including The Schooner Exchange v. McFaddon (1812, on the "jurisdiction of a nation within its own territory").

==== Majority opinion and concurrences ====
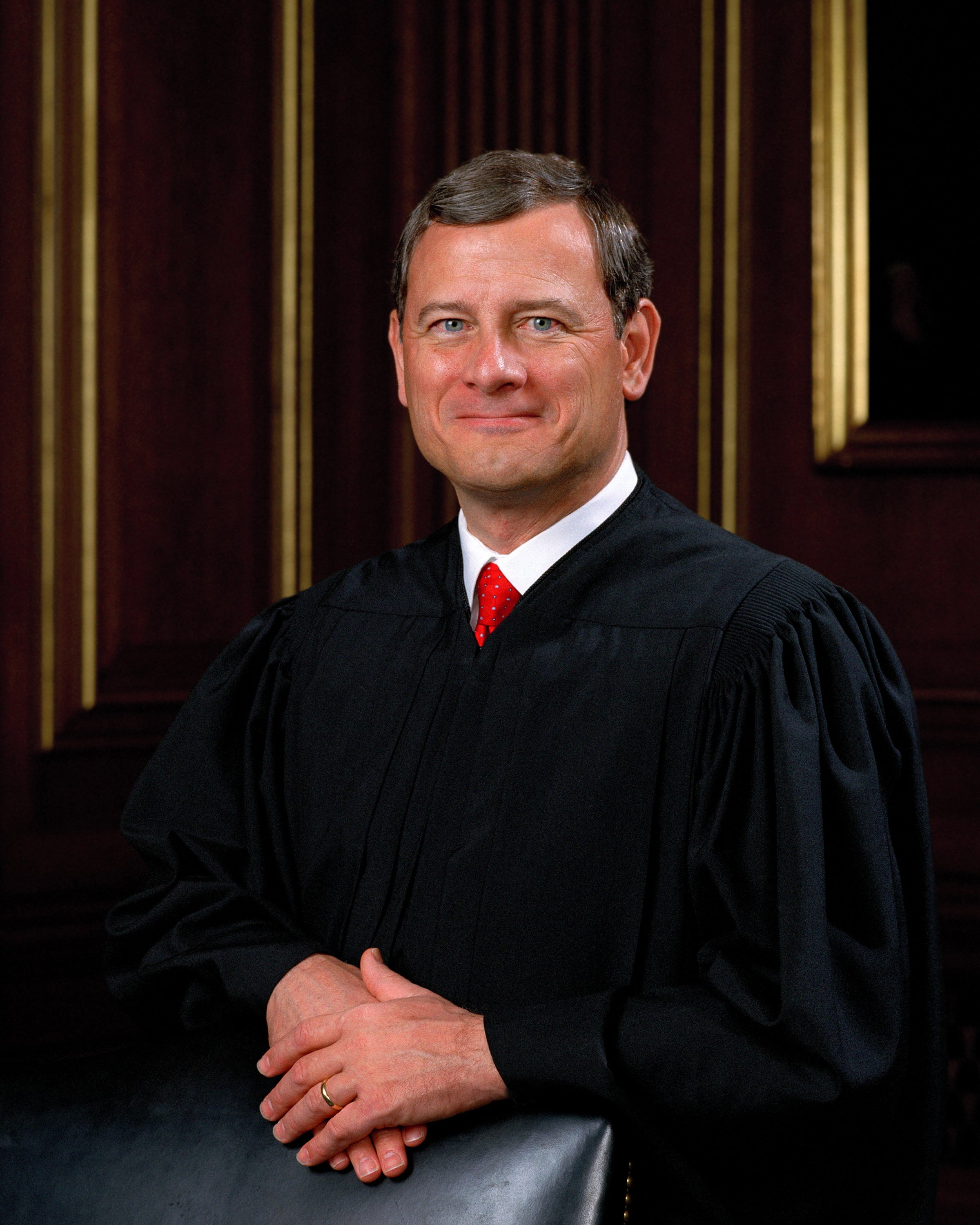
Chief Justice John Roberts wrote for the majority.

The majority opinion, authored by Chief Justice Roberts, and joined by Justices Sotomayor, Kagan, Barrett, and Jackson, ruled on the issue. The opinion held that "[p]eople born in the United States to parents unlawfully or temporarily present are 'subject to the jurisdiction' of the United States and are citizens at birth under the Fourteenth Amendment's Citizenship Clause".

Rejecting the government's argument that the Fourteenth Amendment tied birthright citizenship to primary allegiance based on parental domicile, the opinion held that the Citizenship Clause imposed no such requirement and found little historical support for that interpretation:

Attempts to narrow Wong Kim Ark by noting that the Court's opinion repeatedly referred to the domicile of Wong's parents fail because the holding's underlying reasoning cannot be squared with a domicile requirement; the Court exhaustively canvassed the text and history of the Citizenship Clause and at no point identified any evidence that the ratifiers thought themselves to be imposing a domicile limitation.

The opinion traced a history of U.S. citizenship from English common law and jus soli, or the right of soil, as carried to America and, after the American Revolution, prevailing in every state. The opinion cited Lynch v. Clarke (1844), a case at New York's state high court which found that an Irish child whose parents lived in New York for four years was a citizen by birth. But in Dred Scott v. Sandford (1857), the opinion continued, the U.S. Supreme Court departed from common law and adopted a view that citizenship was based on jus sanguinis, or the right of blood, in order to exclude the descendants of slaves. This was repudiated by abolitionists, it noted.

Amid the American Civil War (1861–1865), the opinion continued, President Abraham Lincoln's attorney general Edward Bates issued a landmark legal opinion that "every person born in the country is, at the moment of birth, prima facie a citizen ... without any reference to race or color, or any other accidental circumstances." This affirmed the right of soil, the majority's opinion noted. Congress' Radical Republicans, it noted, followed Bates' opinion, further affirming jus soli with the Civil Rights Act of 1866, which declared "all persons born in the United States and not subject to any foreign power, excluding Indians not taxed, ... citizens".

But, the majority's opinion continued, the act's opponents argued that Congress could not grant citizenship in such a vast way, with rulings following Dred Scott that might render Bates' opinion and the new act unconstitutional. Therefore, the majority's opinion held, both Congress and the states finished the matter by ratifying the Fourteenth Amendment, putting the "great question of citizenship" over and "beyond the legislative power" as settled constitutionally, "once and for all". With this, the opinion explained,

A child born on American soil and subject to American law was made an American citizen .... To be 'subject to' the jurisdiction of the United States, then, is to 'liv[e] under' its 'dominion', ... a meaning reinforced by the Clause's territorial focus on those born 'in' the United States. The Citizenship Clause uses jurisdiction in its ordinary sense—referring to the power of the United States to govern those within its territory.

The opinion reaffirmed the principle of "[w]hat the Court held in Wong Kim Ark", namely that "the Citizenship Clause incorporated the common law and granted citizenship to nearly all children born in the United States". The opinion added that "in the 128 years since, [the Court has] repeatedly understood the rule ... to guarantee citizenship to all children born in the United States and subject to its power." The opinion concluded that "citizenship, then and now, was the right to have rights—to freely participate in our political community. The Framers of the Fourteenth Amendment extended that promise to 'every free-born person in this land.' We keep that promise today."

==== Jackson's concurrence ====
Justice Jackson's concurring opinion, joined by Justice Sotomayor as to the introduction and first part, called the Reconstruction Amendments an "anticaste, antisubordination reset for the Nation, not a mere spot treatment for the dark stain of slavery", and warned against "Justice Thomas's telling elid[ing] the entire point of the Second Founding". The concurrence called it "the ultimate irony" that his dissent rejected Dred Scott and yet endorsed Dred Scott's core claim that "for certain people, being born on American soil will not suffice to confer citizenship", an "odious claim that the Citizenship Clause plainly rejects".

Quoting social reformer and abolitionist Frederick Douglass on the importance of national memory, the concurrence set the Citizenship Clause within Black Americans' long struggle for freedom and equal rights, and within a "universalist" understanding of liberty and equality as they "fought for the shared humanity of all people". The Fourteenth Amendment's framers aimed toward the "'perfect equality of every human being before the law'", the concurrence concluded, and "a majority ... remembered this today ... and preserved the most basic ... principle of our Nation's founding—that all human beings are created equal—once more".

==== Kavanaugh's concurrence and dissent ====
Justice Kavanaugh's opinion concurred in the judgment voiding the executive order but dissented from the majority's reasoning, arguing that the Citizenship Clause does not necessarily guarantee citizenship to children of "foreign citizens unlawfully or temporarily in the country". It accepted, however, that Congress has long operated on the understanding that it does, incorporating that view into the Nationality Act of 1940 and later immigration statutes. On that basis, the opinion concluded that the executive order is unlawful, though not necessarily unconstitutional, with legal and political implications if Congress were to amend the governing citizenship statute, 8 U.S.C. § 1401(a), with new legislation.

In a footnote, the opinion read that "nothing in this opinion is intended to suggest how birthright citizenship should be addressed as a policy matter". However, it was reported as "implicitly inviting Congress to address the situation" and elsewhere that "the dissenters would encourage Congress to use legislation to change the federal statute ... that codifies the Citizenship Clause to add new exceptions to citizenship as in Trump's order".

==== Dissents ====
Justice Thomas wrote his longest dissenting opinion in his tenure on the Court, which Justice Gorsuch joined, interpreting the Citizenship Clause narrowly. Quoting Frederick Douglass, the opinion argued that American blacks were entitled to citizenship as Americans with "no other homeland" or foreign allegiance, a status not true "for the children of foreign temporary visitors". The opinion further argued that the Fourteenth Amendment had first centered on "equal rights for the freed blacks" but had been "repurposed" to grant citizenship to children of undocumented immigrants and temporary visitors. (The majority opinion termed this historical argument "revisionist".)

Justices Alito and Gorsuch also wrote separate dissenting opinions. Alito's opinion called Barbara "one of the most important decisions in the history of the Court" and "a serious mistake." It argued that the Fourteenth Amendment conferred citizenship only on children who, at birth, owe allegiance solely to the United States, and read Wong Kim Ark as limited to children of parents lawfully present and permanently domiciled in the country.

Gorsuch's opinion would have rejected the facial challenge because, in its view, the executive order was lawful at least as applied to children born to temporary visitors. But, it hinted, long-term undocumented immigrants may be more firmly U.S.-domiciled.

== Reaction and aftermath ==
=== Early polls and reaction ===
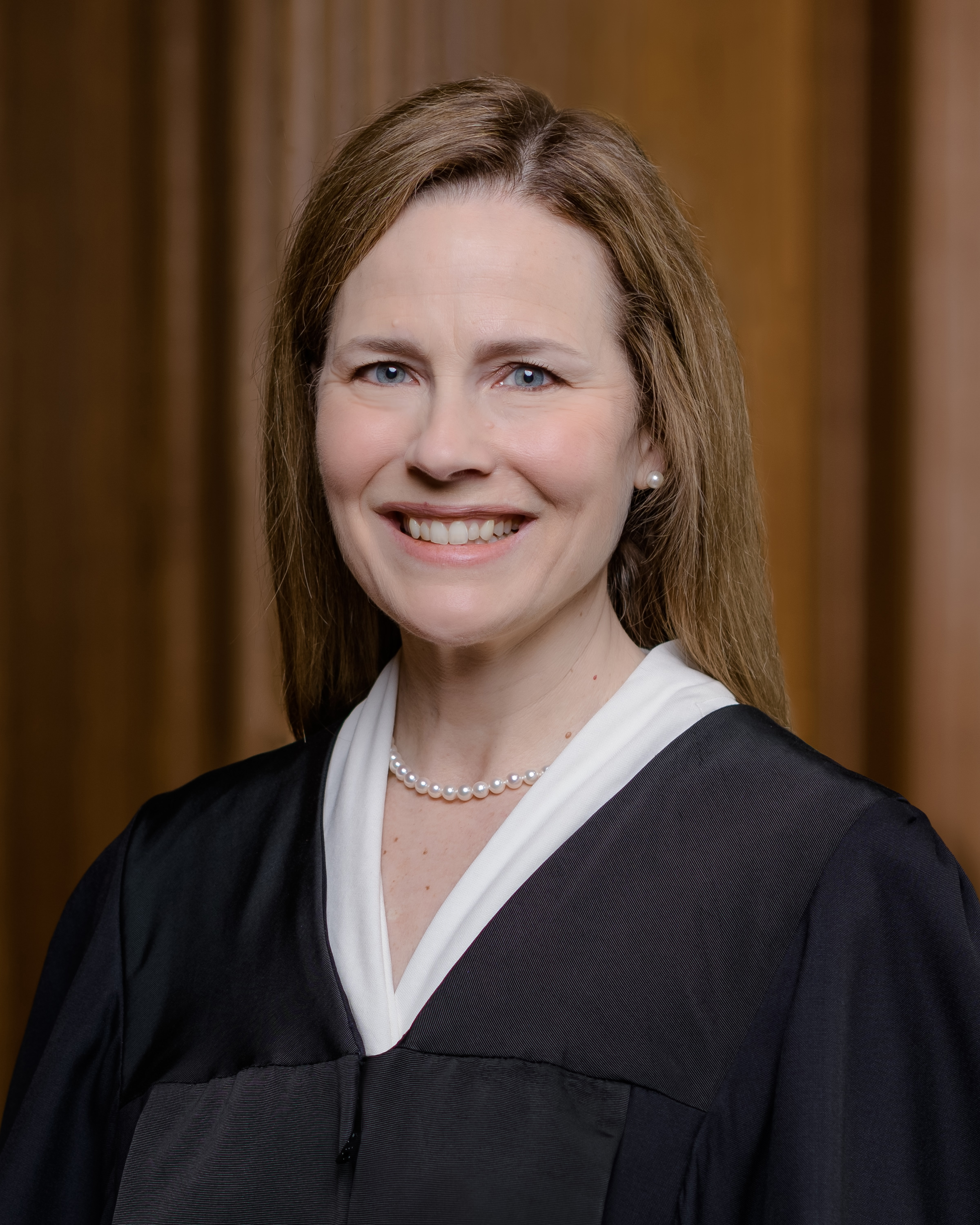
Some conservative backlash targeted Justice Amy Coney Barrett.

The case led news headlines throughout its court term and mixed predictable outcomes with unexpected nuances. Polls conducted shortly before the ruling showed a majority of Americans supported birthright citizenship, including most independents and a plurality of Republicans. Most Republicans who did not identify with the Make America Great Again movement were also opposed to ending birthright citizenship. Trump appointee Justice Barrett received backlash for her "betrayal" from some on the right naming her among "activist judges" to impeach and calling her a "DEI hire". (Vice President JD Vance later said she and the Court made a mistake.)

President Trump called birthright citizenship "expensive and unfair" to the U.S. and urged Congress to address it immediately with legislation. But because the Court's ruling rested on constitutional interpretation, Congress could not simply overturn it legislatively: court reporter Marcia Coyle, writing for the National Constitution Center, wrote that any legislation aiming to alter 8 U.S.C. § 1401(a) would "face steep odds in the current court" and could fail by a single Justice's vote. At the same time, the decision did not eliminate the political branches' ability to discourage or limit birthright citizenship through legislation and enforcement, so it did not completely foreclose reform.

Representative Mike Johnson, the Speaker of the House of Representatives, said "it certainly is time for us to do everything that is possible". He and Heritage Foundation leader Kevin Roberts endorsed a constitutional amendment. USA Today said options were speculative and unlikely amid upcoming midterm elections. Conservative hardliners, emboldened by Kavanaugh's dissent, had leverage in the House, with its very narrow Republican majority, to try forcing enactment by threatening gridlock. White House aides signaled continued immigration momentum by discussing enforcement measures like targeting alleged birth tourism and fraud, and restricting entry for pregnant women. The President's Department of Justice said it would prioritize investigating birth tourism schemes as a national security issue.

Wang said the Court "reaffirm[ed] a fundamental American promise" and continued, "A president cannot change the Constitution by executive fiat. Our brave clients and our legal team stand with millions of people around our country who spoke up for one of our most cherished rights." Wong Kim Ark's great-grandson Norman Wong criticized President Trump, called the executive order a "decree", and said that "[i]f it didn't fly in the face of the Constitution, the Supreme Court would have ruled differently today." Immigrant rights advocates celebrated Barbara, though its margin disappointed attorney Kica Matos. Congressional Asian Pacific American Caucus chair Grace Meng said Barbara protected immigrant families' American dream.

=== Scholarly and media commentary ===
Legal scholars Akhil Reed Amar and Vikram Amar viewed Barbara as a landmark decision, properly grounded in the Constitution, and as a "complete repudiation" of President Trump's "lawless" executive order, enshrining "equal birthright citizenship for all born on American soil and under the American flag". In group conversation with The New York Times, legal scholar William Baude viewed this and other fresh rulings on elections, (Note: Watson v. Republican National Committee) the Federal Reserve, (Note: Trump v. Cook) geofence warrants, (Note: Chatrie v. United States) and tariffs (Note: Learning Resources, Inc. v. Trump) as signs of judicial independence, while legal scholar Steve Vladeck was more skeptical, viewing the decision's narrow margin and dissents as implicating the Court's ability to respond forcefully to future constitutional challenges by the Trump administration, possibly involving future elections.

Writing for MS NOW, Brennan Center attorneys Thomas Wolf and Samuel Breidbart found Kavanaugh's dissent "ominous" and said that dissents with "flawed historical narratives" offered "a road map for a right-wing Congress to complete Trump's failed job". They called the dissents, including Kavanaugh's portion, "an unsettling reminder that we were one vote away from a ruling bringing back Dred Scott". Legal commentator Mark Joseph Stern concurred. Vox legal journalist Ian Millhiser said that the dissents in Barbara showed that the Court was close to destabilizing core constitutional protections and the rule of law, as in Korematsu v. United States (1944).

Journalist Amy Davidson Sorkin called Barbara a landmark in the newest stage of the long fight over birthright citizenship, noting that Roberts' majority opinion conceded that objections had existed from the start. Sorkin responded to Alito's opinion that the majority had made a "mistake", saying that the real mistake was underestimating the threat Alito and his allies posed to birthright citizenship. Judge Steven Menashi and legal scholar Elias Neibart argued that the close ruling made originalist challenges to the traditional understanding of birthright citizenship more credible and consequential, ensuring further constitutional debate.

The Christian Science Monitor also stressed ongoing debate, framed by views on race and ethnicity in the United States and on the intentions of the Fourteenth Amendment's framers. Arguing for a narrower understanding of the Fourteenth Amendment, Menashi and Neibart wrote that the debate would likely continue to intensify. Political advisor Stephen Miller said Barbara allowed people from "third-world nations" to have U.S.-citizen children. The Atlantic's Adam Serwer viewed these remarks as racist and anti-egalitarian. But the narrow margin on constitutionality, he wrote, would likely make overturning Barbara, as with Roe v. Wade (1973), a key conservative political aim. Legal scholar Kate Shaw concurred, comparing Barbara to Planned Parenthood v. Casey (1992).

== Subsequent developments ==
Several days after the Supreme Court decision, on July 8, President Trump posted on his social media platform Truth Social that he would seek a rehearing. He cited reports of Texas billboards advertising maternity healthcare pricing to claim that a massive birth tourism scam was exploiting birthright citizenship, which Texas began investigating. His projected request was considered a long shot, and by July 28, 2026 past the deadline, no petition for rehearing had been filed.

Inspired by Justice Kavanaugh's opinion, Representative John McGuire introduced the Birthright Citizenship Clarification Act on July 10, aiming to codify President Trump's executive order. On July 23, Representative Morgan Griffith introduced a bill to repeal federal laws that granted birthright citizenship to children born in the U.S. territories Guam, Puerto Rico, the Northern Mariana Islands and the U.S. Virgin Islands.

=== Executive Order 14418 ===
President Trump signed two new executive orders on August 6. One order, titled "Ending Birth Tourism", barred visas for suspected birth tourists. Reuters reported that existing federal regulations already barred "using temporary visas for the purpose of obtaining U.S. citizenship for a newborn" and that it was unclear how the new order would be enforced.

The other order, Executive Order 14418, was titled "Continuing to Protect the Meaning and Value of American Citizenship". This order purported to expand who is ineligible for birthright citizenship, including children of birth tourists, children of staff working for foreign governments, and children born to parents designated as "alien enemies". Executive Order 14418 also prohibited birthright citizenship to children born in U.S. territories "where citizenship is not conferred by Federal statute."

On August 11, the challengers in Trump v. Barbara filed a motion asking Judge Laplante to clarify that Executive Order 14418 violated his existing ruling. The challengers argued that the Supreme Court had reaffirmed that the Citizenship Clause "'granted citizenship to nearly all children born in the United States', save only 'the "children of ambassadors" and other representatives of foreign sovereigns' along with Native American Tribal members,'" and that the president could not create additional exceptions.

== See also ==
- Calvin's Case
- Ex parte Chin King
- Geary Act
- Look Tin Eli
- Koszta Affair
- McKay v. Campbell
- Natural-born-citizen clause (United States)
