= Ilan Wurman =

American law professor

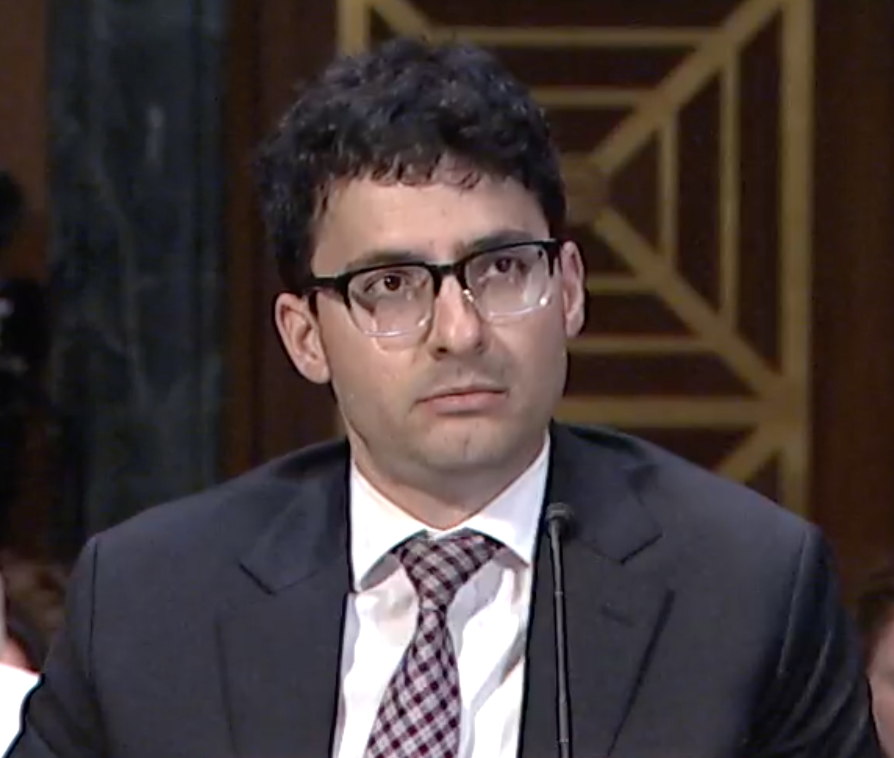
- Wurman speaking to the Senate Judiciary Committee in 2026

Academic background
- Education: Claremont McKenna College (BA); Stanford University (JD)

Academic work
- Discipline: U.S. constitutional law, U.S. administrative law
- Institutions: University of Minnesota Law School, Arizona State University (Sandra Day O'Connor College of Law)

Ilan Wurman is an American legal scholar. He is the Julius E. Davis Professor of Law at the University of Minnesota Law School, where he teaches administrative law and constitutional law. He previously taught at the Sandra Day O'Connor College of Law at Arizona State University. He is the author of A Debt Against the Living: An Introduction to Originalism (2017) and The Second Founding: An Introduction to the Fourteenth Amendment (2020). His scholarship focuses on originalism, the Fourteenth Amendment, administrative law, and separation of powers. In both 2025 and 2026, his scholarship on birthright citizenship received broader public attention in connection with Trump v. Barbara.

== Education and early career ==
Wurman graduated from Claremont McKenna College in 2009 with a major in government and physics, and from Stanford Law School in 2013. While at Stanford, he served as the senior articles editor of the Stanford Law Review. After law school, he clerked for Judge Jerry E. Smith of the United States Court of Appeals for the Fifth Circuit, and practiced law at Winston & Strawn in Washington, D.C. before entering academia.

== Academic career ==
Wurman taught at the Sandra Day O'Connor College of Law at Arizona State University, where he taught administrative law and constitutional law. In 2024, he joined the University of Minnesota Law School as an associate professor of law with tenure. Later that year, he was appointed Julius E. Davis Professor of Law.

== Scholarship ==
Wurman's scholarship focuses on administrative law, constitutional law, originalism, separation of powers, and the Fourteenth Amendment. His writing has appeared in the Yale Law Journal, Stanford Law Review, University of Chicago Law Review, University of Pennsylvania Law Review, Virginia Law Review, Duke Law Journal, Minnesota Law Review, Notre Dame Law Review, and Texas Law Review.

In A Debt Against the Living: An Introduction to Originalism (2017), Wurman defended originalism as a method of constitutional interpretation. In The Second Founding: An Introduction to the Fourteenth Amendment (2020), he examined the original meaning of the Fourteenth Amendment's Due Process, Equal Protection, and Privileges or Immunities Clauses. In 2021, The Second Founding was named a Choice Outstanding Academic Title.

His books have been reviewed in The Federal Lawyer, Claremont Review of Books, and Law & Liberty.

=== Birthright citizenship ===
In February 2025, Wurman and Randy Barnett co-authored a New York Times guest essay arguing that President Donald Trump's executive order restricting birthright citizenship had stronger constitutional support than many critics contended. In 2026, SCOTUSblog highlighted Wurman's amicus brief in Trump v. Barbara as one of the briefs supporting the Trump administration's position in the case, and Reuters quoted him before oral argument on the scope of birthright citizenship.

Wurman also testified before the United States Senate Committee on the Judiciary at a hearing titled Protecting American Citizenship: Birthright Citizenship for Illegal Aliens and Tourists, alongside Charles J. Cooper, Amanda Frost, Alejandro Barranco, and Peter Schweizer.

The federal government cited Wurman's article Jurisdiction and Citizenship in its merits brief and reply brief in Trump v. Barbara. During oral arguments, Solicitor General D. John Sauer referred the justices to Wurman's amicus brief.

Wurman's birthright-citizenship arguments drew criticism from legal commentators and scholars. In Lawfare, Chris Mirasola argued that Barnett and Wurman invoked a "nonexistent 'puzzle'" of international law to support their theory. In Just Security, Marty Lederman and David J. Bier described their defense of Trump's executive order as "fundamentally flawed". A 2025 Cornell Law Review Online essay by Anthony M. Kreis, Evan D. Bernick, and Paul A. Gowder characterized the position as an "ahistorical, revisionist interpretation" of the Citizenship Clause.

In his dissent in Trump v. Barbara, Justice Clarence Thomas cited Wurman's scholarship three times.

== Selected works ==
- A Debt Against the Living: An Introduction to Originalism (Cambridge University Press, 2017)
- The Second Founding: An Introduction to the Fourteenth Amendment (Cambridge University Press, 2020)
- Administrative Law Theory and Fundamentals: An Integrated Approach (Foundation Press, 2021; 3rd ed. 2025)
- Administrative Law Theory and Fundamentals: An Integrated Approach (Foundation Press, 2021; 3rd ed. 2025)
- The Constitution of 1789: A New Introduction (Cambridge University Press, 2026)
