= United States v. Wong Kim Ark =

- Supreme Court of the United States

Argued March 5, 8, 1897 Decided March 28, 1898
- Full case name: United States v. Wong Kim Ark
- Citations: 169 U.S. 649 (more) 18 S. Ct. 456; 42 L. Ed. 890; 1898 U.S. LEXIS 1515
- Decision: Opinion

Case history
- Prior: Appeal from the District Court of the United States for the Northern District of California; 71 F. 382

Questions presented
- Whether a child born in the United States, of parents of Chinese descent, who, at the time of his birth, are subjects of the Emperor of China, but have a permanent domicil and residence in the United States, and are there carrying on business, and are not employed in any diplomatic or official capacity under the Emperor of China, becomes at the time of his birth a citizen of the United States, by virtue of the first clause of the Fourteenth Amendment of the Constitution, "All persons born or naturalized in the United States, and subject to the jurisdiction thereof, are citizens of the United States and of the State wherein they reside."

Holding
- a) A child born in the United States to alien parents is a citizen.; b) The phrase "subject to the jurisdiction thereof" should be interpreted "in light of the common law".

Court membership
- Chief Justice Melville Fuller Associate Justices John M. Harlan · Horace Gray; David J. Brewer · Henry B. Brown; George Shiras Jr. · Edward D. White; Rufus W. Peckham · Joseph McKenna

Case opinions
- Majority: Gray, joined by Brewer, Brown, Shiras, White, Peckham
- Dissent: Fuller, joined by Harlan
- McKenna took no part in the consideration or decision of the case.

Laws applied
- U.S. Const. amend. XIV

United States v. Wong Kim Ark, 169 U.S. 649 (1898), is a landmark decision of the Supreme Court of the United States which held that "a child born in the United States, of parents of Chinese descent, who, at the time of his birth, are subjects of the Emperor of China, but have a permanent domicile and residence in the United States, and are there carrying on business, and are not employed in any diplomatic or official capacity under the Emperor of China" became "at the time of his birth a citizen of the United States by virtue of the first clause of the Fourteenth Amendment of the Constitution."

Wong Kim Ark was the first Supreme Court case to decide on the status of children born in the United States to alien parents. This decision established an important precedent in its interpretation of the Citizenship Clause of the Fourteenth Amendment to the Constitution.

Wong Kim Ark, who was born in San Francisco, had been denied re-entry to the United States after a trip abroad, under the Chinese Exclusion Act, a law banning virtually all Chinese immigration and prohibiting Chinese immigrants from becoming naturalized U.S. citizens. He challenged the government's refusal to recognize his citizenship, and the Supreme Court ruled in his favor, holding that the Citizenship Clause should be interpreted "in light of the common law". The case highlighted disagreements over the precise meaning of one phrase in the Citizenship Clause—namely, the provision that a person born in the United States who is "subject to the jurisdiction thereof" acquires automatic citizenship.

The Supreme Court's majority concluded that this phrase referred to being required to obey U.S. law; on this basis, they interpreted the Citizenship Clause to grant citizenship to children born in the United States, with only a limited set of exceptions based on English common law. The Court held that being born to alien parents was not one of those exceptions. The Court's dissenters argued that being subject to the jurisdiction of the United States meant not being subject to any foreign power—that is, not being claimed as a citizen by another country via jus sanguinis (inheriting citizenship from a parent)—an interpretation which, in the minority's view, would have excluded "the children of foreigners, happening to be born to them while passing through the country".

In the words of a 2007 legal analysis of events following the Wong Kim Ark decision, "[t]he parameters of the jus soli principle, as stated by the court in Wong Kim Ark, have never been seriously questioned by the Supreme Court, and have been accepted as dogma by lower courts." A 2010 review of the history of the Citizenship Clause notes that Wong Kim Ark held that the guarantee of birthright citizenship "applies to children of foreigners present on American soil" and states that the Supreme Court "has not re-examined this issue since the concept of 'illegal alien' entered the language." Since the 1990s, however, controversy has arisen over the longstanding practice of granting automatic citizenship to U.S.-born children of illegal immigrants, and legal scholars disagree over whether the Wong Kim Ark precedent applies when alien parents are in the country illegally. Attempts have been made from time to time in Congress to restrict birthright citizenship, either via statutory redefinition of the term jurisdiction, or by overriding both the Wong Kim Ark ruling and the Citizenship Clause itself through an amendment to the Constitution, but no such proposal has been enacted. In 2025, President Donald Trump issued Executive Order 14160, which sought to deny birthright citizenship to children of illegal immigrants and temporary residents; however, it was challenged in court and ultimately struck down by the Supreme Court on June 30, 2026, in Trump v. Barbara.

== Background ==
=== Early history of United States citizenship law ===
Throughout the history of the United States, the dominant legal principle governing citizenship has been jus soli—the principle that birth within the territorial limits of the United States confers automatic citizenship, excluding slaves before the American Civil War. Although there was no actual definition of citizenship in United States law until after the Civil War, it was generally accepted that anyone born in the United States was automatically a citizen.

The common law principle of jus soli was upheld in an 1844 New York state case, Lynch v. Clarke, in which a state judge held that a woman born in New York City, of alien parents temporarily sojourning there, was a U.S. citizen.

African slaves were originally excluded from United States citizenship. In 1857, the United States Supreme Court held in Dred Scott v. Sandford that slaves, former slaves, and their descendants were not eligible under the Constitution to be citizens. Additionally, Native Americans were not originally recognized as citizens, since Native American tribes were considered to be outside the jurisdiction of the U.S. government.

=== Citizenship clause of the Fourteenth Amendment ===
After the Civil War and the subsequent abolition of slavery, Congress enacted the Civil Rights Act of 1866. One provision of the statute granted citizenship to "all persons born in the United States and not subject to any foreign power, excluding Indians not taxed".

Concerns were raised that the citizenship guarantee in the Civil Rights Act might be repealed by a later Congress or struck down as unconstitutional by the courts. Soon after the passage of the Act, Congress drafted the Fourteenth Amendment to the Constitution and sent it to the states for ratification (a process which was completed in 1868). Among the Fourteenth Amendment's many provisions was the Citizenship Clause, which entrenched a guarantee of citizenship in the Constitution by stating, "All persons born or naturalized in the United States, and subject to the jurisdiction thereof, are citizens of the United States and of the State wherein they reside."

The Citizenship Clause was proposed by Senator Jacob M. Howard of Michigan on May 30, 1866, as an amendment to the joint resolution from the House of Representatives which had framed the initial draft of the proposed Fourteenth Amendment. The heated debate on the proposed new language in the Senate focused on whether Howard's proposed language would apply more broadly than the wording of the 1866 Civil Rights Act.

Howard said that the clause "is simply declaratory of what I regard as the law of the land already, that every person born within the limits of the United States, and subject to their jurisdiction, is by virtue of natural law and national law a citizen of the United States." He added that citizenship "will not, of course, include persons born in the United States who are foreigners, aliens, who belong to the families of ambassadors or foreign ministers accredited to the Government of the United States, but will include every other class of persons"—a comment which would later raise questions as to whether Congress had originally intended that U.S.-born children of foreign parents were to be included as citizens.

James R. Doolittle of Wisconsin objected that the citizenship provision would not be sufficiently narrow to exclude Native Americans from citizenship, and in an attempt to address this issue, he proposed to add a phrase taken from the Civil Rights Act—"excluding Indians not taxed". Although most Senators agreed that birthright citizenship should not be extended to Native Americans, a majority saw no need to clarify the issue, and Doolittle's proposal was voted down. Upon its return to the House of Representatives, the proposed Fourteenth Amendment received little debate; no one spoke in opposition to the Senate's addition of the Citizenship Clause, and the complete proposed amendment was approved by the House on June 13, 1866, and declared to have been ratified on July 28, 1868.

==== Cases prior to Wong Kim Ark ====
The Supreme Court ruled in an 1884 case (Elk v. Wilkins) that an Indian born on a reservation did not acquire United States citizenship at birth (because he was not subject to U.S. jurisdiction) and could not claim citizenship later on merely by moving to non-reservation U.S. territory and renouncing his former tribal allegiance. Native Americans were subsequently granted citizenship by the Indian Citizenship Act of 1924.

The question of whether the Citizenship Clause applied to persons born in the United States to Chinese immigrants first came before the courts in an 1884 case, In re Look Tin Sing. Look Tin Sing was born in Mendocino, California in 1870 to Chinese immigrants. In 1879, his merchant father sent him to China; but upon returning from China in 1884 at age 14, he was barred from reentering the United States by officials who objected to his not having met the documentation requirements imposed at the time on Chinese immigrants under the Restriction Acts of 1882 or of 1884. Look's case was heard in the federal circuit court for California by U.S. Supreme Court Associate Justice Stephen J. Field and two other federal judges. Lucy E. Salyer, a history professor at the University of New Hampshire, writes that Justice Field "issued an open invitation to all lawyers in the area to give their opinions on the constitutional questions involved" in the case. Field focused on the meaning of the subject to the jurisdiction thereof phrase of the Citizenship Clause, held that Look was indeed subject to U.S. jurisdiction at the time of his birth irrespective of the alien status of his parents, and on this basis ordered U.S. officials to recognize Look as a citizen and allow him to enter the United States. The Look Tin Sing ruling was not appealed and was never reviewed by the Supreme Court. A similar conclusion was reached by the federal circuit court for Oregon in the 1888 cases of Ex parte Chin King and Ex parte Chan San Hee.

In an 1892 case, Gee Fook Sing v. U.S., a federal appeals court in California for the same circuit (by this time known as the Ninth Circuit Court of Appeals) concluded that a Chinese man would have been recognized as a United States citizen if he could have presented satisfactory evidence that he had in fact been born in the U.S. This case was also never brought before the Supreme Court.

The Supreme Court's 1873 Slaughterhouse Cases decision contained the statement that "The phrase, 'subject to its jurisdiction,' was intended to exclude from its operation children of ministers, consuls, and citizens or subjects of foreign states born within the United States." However, since the Slaughterhouse Cases did not deal with claims of birthright citizenship, this comment was dismissed in Wong Kim Ark and later cases as a passing remark (obiter dictum) lacking any force as a controlling precedent. As to whether the Wong Kim Ark decision was correct on this point or not, modern scholars are divided.

=== Chinese Exclusion Acts ===
Like many other immigrants, Chinese were drawn to the United States—initially to participate in the California Gold Rush of 1849, then moving on to railroad construction, farming, and work in cities. An 1868 treaty (named the Burlingame Treaty after one of the American negotiators) expanded trade and migration between the United States and China. The treaty did not address the citizenship of children born in the United States to Chinese parents, or vice versa. Regarding naturalization (acquisition of citizenship other than at birth), the treaty contained a provision stating that "nothing herein contained shall be held to confer naturalization ... upon the subjects of China in the United States."

Chinese immigrants to the United States were met with considerable distrust, resentment, and discrimination almost from the time of their first arrival. Many politicians argued that the Chinese were so different in so many ways that they not only would never (or even could) assimilate into American culture, but that they represented a threat to the country's principles and institutions. In this climate of popular anti-Chinese sentiment, Congress in 1882 enacted the Chinese Exclusion Act, which placed limits on Chinese immigration to the United States. (The original Chinese Exclusion Act was amended several times—such as by the 1888 Scott Act and the 1892 Geary Act—and as a result, it is sometimes referred to in the plural as the "Chinese Exclusion Acts".) Chinese already in the U.S. were allowed to stay, but they were ineligible for naturalization and, if they left the U.S. and later wished to return, they needed to apply anew and obtain approval again. Chinese laborers and miners were specifically barred from coming (or returning) to the United States under the terms of the law.

== Case history ==
=== Wong Kim Ark ===
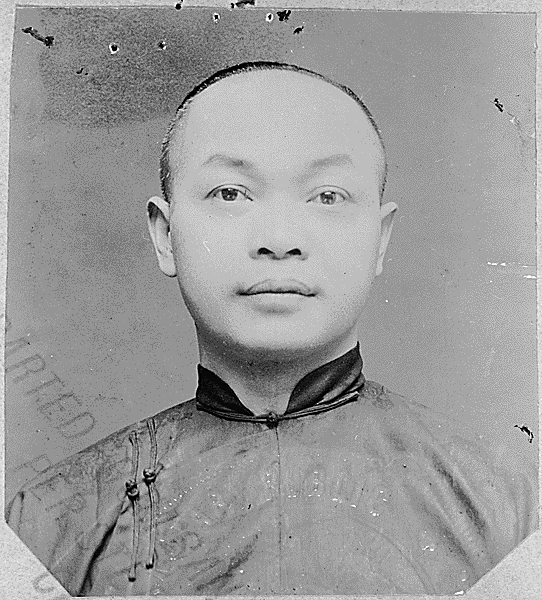
Wong Kim Ark, in a photograph taken from a 1904 U.S. immigration document

Wong Kim Ark (simplified Chinese: 黄金德; traditional Chinese: 黃金德; pinyin: Huáng Jīndé; Taishanese: Vong^{3} Gim^{1}-ak^{2}; c. 1868/73 – after 1931) was born in San Francisco, California, at 751 Sacramento Street, the address of a Chinatown business (Quong Sing) maintained by his merchant parents. Various sources state or imply his year of birth as being 1873, 1871, 1870, or 1868. His father, Wong Si Ping, and mother, Lee Wee, emigrated from Taishan, Guangdong, China and were not United States citizens, as the Naturalization Law of 1802 had made them ineligible for naturalization either before or after his birth. The family owned a combined general store and butcher shop and lived in an apartment above it. Wong did not become a merchant like his father, but worked as a cook. He would spend most of his documented life living in San Francisco's Chinatown and working as a cook in various local restaurants. During his working life, he sent part of his earnings to his family in China.

When Wong Kim Ark was a child, his parents took him back to China. The family's return to China may have been spurred by the San Francisco riot of 1877. His parents never returned to the United States, while he returned to California with an uncle a few years later and worked as a dishwasher and cook in a mining camp in the Sierra Nevada mountains. In 1889, he left for China and returned to his family's village in Taishan, Ong Sing. While in Taishan, Wong Kim Ark married Yee Shee, who was from a village near his familial one. He returned to California in 1890, where he settled in San Francisco and resumed working as a cook, leaving behind in Taishan not only his parents but also his wife, who gave birth to their first son after he left. Under the Chinese Exclusion Act of 1882, he as a laborer could not bring his wife to the United States. Upon arrival alone at San Francisco in July 1890, he was readmitted on the ground that he was a native-born citizen of the United States, but only after an unnamed Bureau of Immigration official left a note in his file questioning the veracity of his claim of birth in the United States.

In November 1894, Wong sailed to China for another temporary visit to his family in Taishan. He met his oldest son for the first time, and his second son was conceived. But when he returned in August 1895 on the SS Coptic, he was detained at the Port of San Francisco by the Collector of Customs, who denied him permission to enter the country, arguing that Wong was not a U.S. citizen despite his having been born in the U.S., but was instead a Chinese subject because his parents were Chinese. Wong was confined for five months on steamships off the coast of San Francisco while his case was being tried. He was eventually freed on $250 bail and continued to work as a cook while living in a rented room in San Francisco as the case progressed.

=== Lower Courts ===
According to Salyer, the San Francisco attorney George Collins had tried to persuade the federal Justice Department to bring a Chinese birthright citizenship case before the Supreme Court. An article by Collins was published in the May/June 1895 American Law Review, criticizing the Look Tin Sing ruling by Judge Field and the federal government's unwillingness to challenge it, and advocating the international law view of jus sanguinis citizenship. Eventually, Collins was able to convince U.S. Attorney Henry Foote, who "searched for a viable test case and settled on Wong Kim Ark".

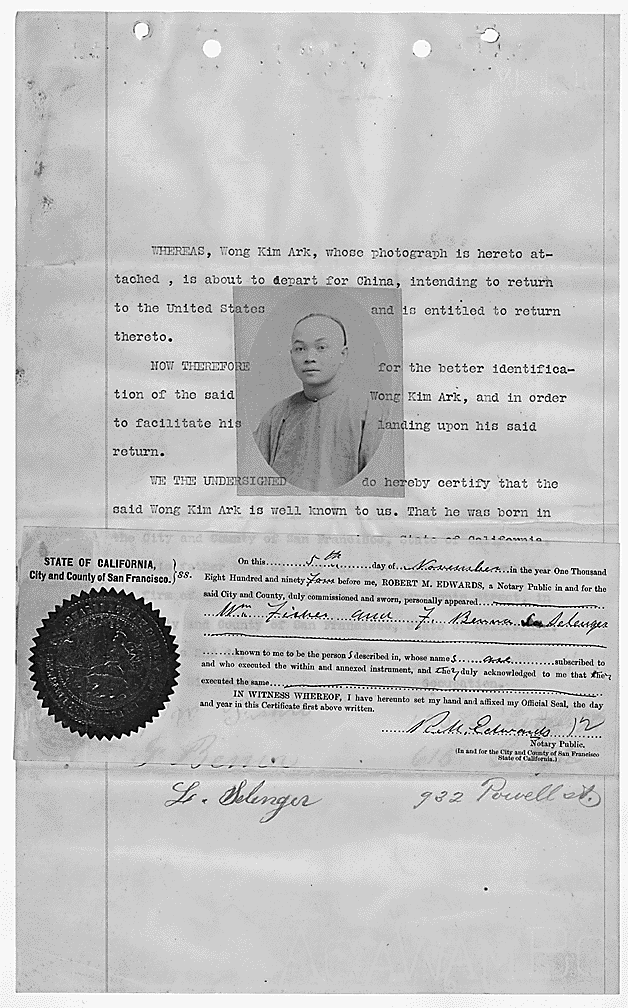
An 1894 notarized statement by witnesses attesting to the identity of Wong Kim Ark. A photograph of Wong is affixed to the statement.

With the assistance of legal representation by the Chinese Consolidated Benevolent Association, Wong Kim Ark challenged the refusal to recognize his birth claim to U.S. citizenship, and a petition for a writ of habeas corpus was filed on his behalf in federal district court.

The arguments presented before District Judge William W. Morrow centered on which of two competing interpretations of the phrase subject to the jurisdiction thereof in the Citizenship Clause should govern a situation involving a child born in the United States to alien parents.

The U.S. government claimed that subject to the jurisdiction thereof meant "to be subject to the political jurisdiction of the United States"—an interpretation, based on international law, which would exclude parents and their children who owed allegiance to another country via the principle of jus sanguinis (citizenship inherited from a parent). They argued that Wong's claim to U.S. citizenship was ruled out by the Supreme Court's interpretation of jurisdiction in its 1873 Slaughterhouse Cases ruling. The question of the citizenship status of U.S.-born children of alien parents had, up to this time, never been decided by the Supreme Court leading Judge Morrow to decide that the remark about the citizenship clause in Slaughterhouse was obiter dictum. The government also cited a similar statement in Elk v. Wilkins, but the judge was not convinced by this argument either.

Wong's attorneys argued that the phrase meant "'subject to the laws of the United States,' comprehending, in this expression, the allegiance that aliens owe in a foreign country to obey its laws"—an interpretation, based on the common law inherited by the United States from England, that would encompass essentially everyone born in the U.S. via the principle of jus soli (citizenship based on place of birth). Wong's attorneys cited the Look Tin Sing case, and the district judge agreed that in the absence of clear direction from the Supreme Court, this case definitively settled the question of citizenship for Wong and others like him as far as federal courts in the Ninth Circuit were concerned. The judge saw the Look Tin Sing holding reaffirmed in the Gee Fook Sing case and noted further that another part of the Supreme Court's Slaughterhouse Cases opinion said that "it is only necessary that [a man] should be born or naturalized in the United States to be a citizen of the Union." Concluding that the Look Tin Sing decision constituted a controlling precedent in the Ninth Circuit, Judge Morrow ruled that subject to the jurisdiction thereof referred to being subject to U.S. law (the first of the two proposed interpretations). On January 3, 1896, the judge declared Wong Kim Ark to be a citizen because he was born in the U.S.

The U.S. government appealed the district court ruling directly to the United States Supreme Court. According to Salyer, government officials—realizing that the decision in this case "was of great importance, not just to Chinese Americans, but to all American citizens who had been born to alien parents", and concerned about the possible effect of an early ruling by the Supreme Court on the 1896 presidential election—delayed the timing of their appeal so as to avoid the possibility of a decision based more on policy concerns than the merits of the case. Oral arguments before the Supreme Court were held on March 5, 1897. Solicitor General Holmes Conrad presented the government's case; Wong was represented before the Court by Maxwell Evarts, former U.S. Assistant Attorney General J. Hubley Ashton, and Thomas D. Riordan.

== Supreme Court ==
The Supreme Court considered the "single question" in the case to be "whether a child born in the United States, of parent[s] of Chinese descent, who, at the time of his birth, are subjects of the Emperor of China, but have a permanent domicil [sic] and residence in the United States, and are there carrying on business, and are not employed in any diplomatic or official capacity under the Emperor of China, becomes at the time of his birth a citizen of the United States." It was conceded that if Wong was a U.S. citizen, "the acts of Congress known as the 'Chinese Exclusion Acts,' prohibiting persons of the Chinese race, and especially Chinese laborers, from coming into the United States, do not and cannot apply to him."

=== Opinion of the Court ===
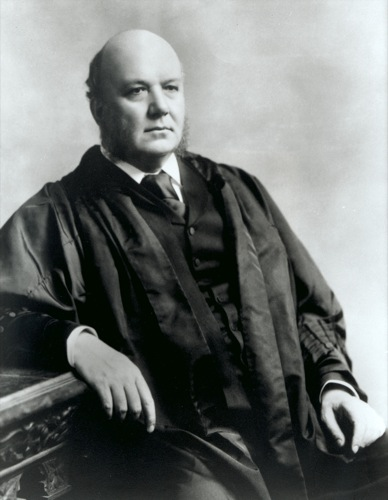
Associate Justice Horace Gray wrote the opinion of the Court in the Wong Kim Ark case.

In a 6–2 decision issued on March 28, 1898, the Supreme Court held that Wong Kim Ark had acquired U.S. citizenship at birth and that "the American citizenship which Wong Kim Ark acquired by birth within the United States has not been lost or taken away by anything happening since his birth." Associate Justice Horace Gray wrote the majority opinion and was joined by Associate Justices David J. Brewer, Henry B. Brown, George Shiras Jr., Edward Douglass White, and Rufus W. Peckham.

The Court stated that "subject to the jurisdiction thereof" should be interpreted "in the light of the common law" which had included as subjects virtually all native-born children, excluding only those who were born to foreign rulers or diplomats, born on foreign public ships, or born to enemy forces engaged in hostile occupation of the country's territory. The Court's majority held that the subject to the jurisdiction phrase in the Citizenship Clause excluded from U.S. citizenship only those persons covered by one of these three exceptions (plus a fourth "single additional exception"—namely, that Indian tribes "not taxed" were not considered subject to U.S. jurisdiction). The majority concluded that none of these four exceptions to U.S. jurisdiction applied to Wong; in particular, they observed that "during all the time of their said residence in the United States, as domiciled residents therein, the said mother and father of said Wong Kim Ark were engaged in the prosecution of business, and were never engaged in any diplomatic or official capacity under the Emperor of China".

Quoting approvingly from an 1812 case, The Schooner Exchange v. M'Faddon, in which Chief Justice John Marshall said, "The jurisdiction of the nation within its own territory is necessarily exclusive and absolute"—and agreeing with the district judge who had heard Wong's original habeas corpus petition that comments in the Slaughterhouse Cases about the citizenship status of children born to non-citizen parents did not constitute a binding precedent—the Court ruled that Wong was a U.S. citizen from birth, via the Fourteenth Amendment, and that the restrictions of the Chinese Exclusion Act did not apply to him. An act of Congress, they held, does not trump the Constitution; such a law "cannot control [the Constitution's] meaning, or impair its effect, but must be construed and executed in subordination to its provisions." The majority opinion referred to Calvin's Case (1608) as stating the fundamental common law principle that all people born within the King's "allegiance" were subjects, including children of "aliens in amity".

=== Dissent ===
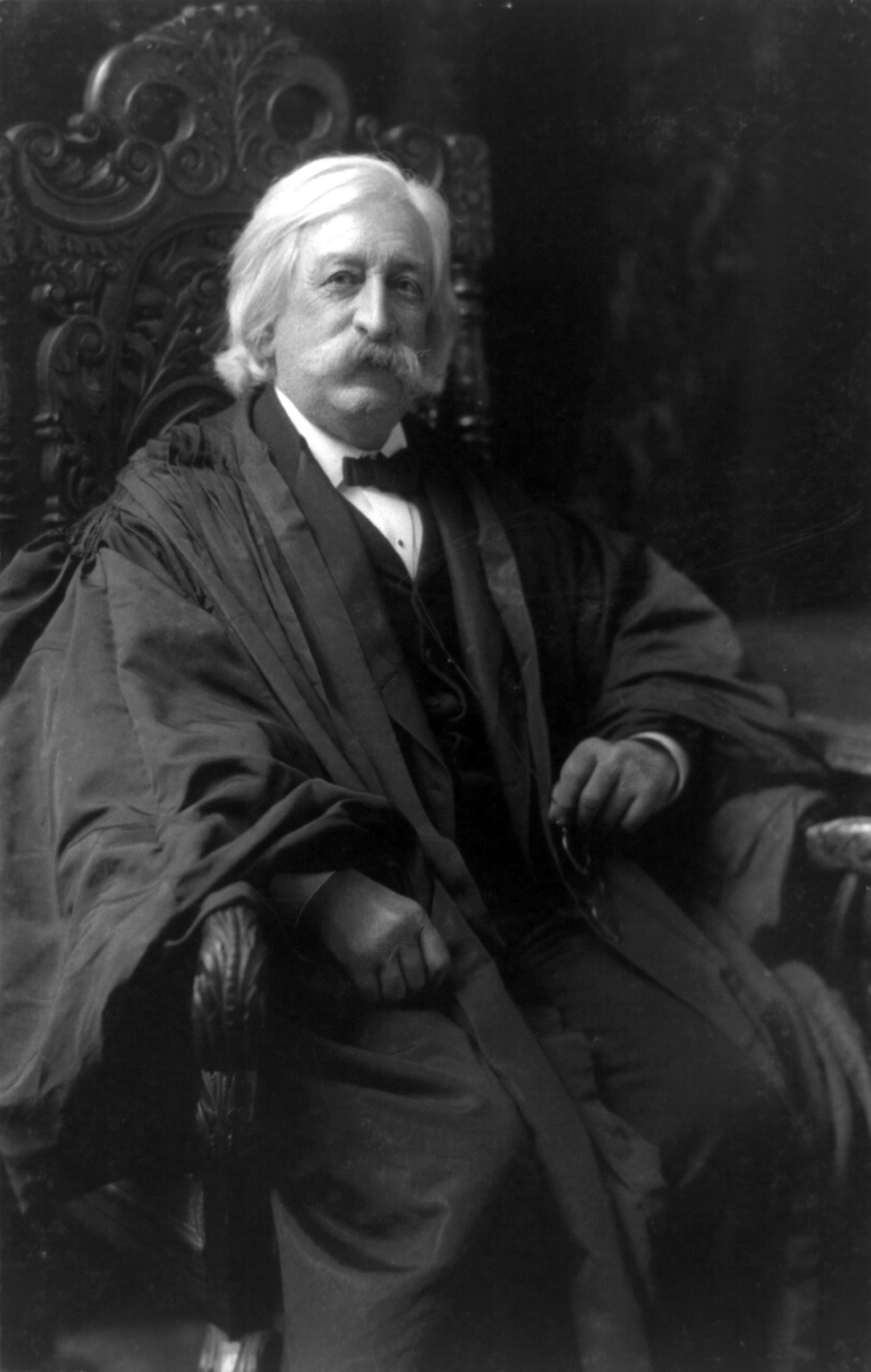
Chief Justice Melville Fuller wrote the dissent in the Wong Kim Ark case.

Chief Justice Melville Fuller was joined by Associate Justice John Marshall Harlan in a dissent which, "for the most part, may be said to be predicated upon the recognition of the international law doctrine". The dissenters argued that the history of U.S. citizenship law had broken with English common law tradition after independence—citing as an example the embracing in the U.S. of the right of expatriation (giving up of one's native citizenship) and the rejection of the contrary British doctrine of perpetual allegiance. The dissenters argued that the principle of jus sanguinis (that is, the concept of a child inheriting his or her father's citizenship by descent regardless of birthplace) had been more pervasive in U.S. legal history since independence. Based on an assessment of U.S. and Chinese treaty and naturalization law, the dissenters claimed that "the children of Chinese born in this country do not, ipso facto, become citizens of the United States unless the fourteenth amendment overrides both treaty and statute."

Pointing to the language of the Civil Rights Act of 1866, an act of Congress which declared to be citizens "all persons born in the United States and not subject to any foreign power, excluding Indians not taxed", and which was enacted into law only two months before the Fourteenth Amendment was proposed by Congress, the dissenters argued that "it is not open to reasonable doubt that the words 'subject to the jurisdiction thereof,' in the amendment, were used as synonymous with the words 'and not subject to any foreign power'". In the dissenters' view, excessive reliance on jus soli (birthplace) as the principal determiner of citizenship would lead to an untenable state of affairs in which "the children of foreigners, happening to be born to them while passing through the country, whether of royal parentage or not, or whether of the Mongolian, Malay or other race, were eligible to the presidency, while children of our citizens, born abroad, were not."

The dissenters acknowledged that other children of foreigners—including former slaves—had, over the years, acquired U.S. citizenship through birth on U.S. soil. But they still saw a difference between those people and U.S.-born individuals of Chinese ancestry, because of strong cultural traditions discouraging Chinese immigrants from assimilating into mainstream American society, Chinese laws of the time which made renouncing allegiance to the Chinese emperor a capital crime, and the provisions of the Chinese Exclusion Act making Chinese immigrants already in the United States ineligible for citizenship. The question for the dissenters was "not whether [Wong Kim Ark] was born in the U.S. or subject to the jurisdiction thereof ... but whether his or her parents have the ability, under U.S. or foreign law, statutory or treaty-based, to become citizens of the U.S. themselves".

In a lecture to a group of law students shortly before the decision was released, Harlan commented that the Chinese had long been excluded from American society "upon the idea that this is a race utterly foreign to us and never will assimilate with us." Without the exclusion legislation, Harlan stated his opinion that vast numbers of Chinese "would have rooted out the American population" in the western United States. Acknowledging the opposing view supporting citizenship for American-born Chinese, he said that "Of course, the argument on the other side is that the very words of the constitution embrace such a case." Commenting on the Wong Kim Ark case shortly after the issuance of the Court's ruling in 1898, San Francisco attorney Marshall B. Woodworth wrote that "the error the dissent apparently falls into is that it does not recognize that the United States, as a sovereign power, has the right to adopt any rule of citizenship it may see fit and that the rule of international law does not furnish [by its own force] the sole and exclusive test of citizenship of the United States".

== Subsequent developments ==
=== Contemporary reactions ===
In an analysis of the Wong Kim Ark case written shortly after the decision in 1898, Marshall B. Woodworth laid out the two competing theories of jurisdiction in the Citizenship Clause and observed that "[t]he fact that the decision of the court was not unanimous indicates that the question is at least debatable." Woodworth concluded, however, that the Supreme Court's ruling laid the issue to rest, saying that "it is difficult to see what valid objection can be raised thereto". Another analysis of the case, published by the Yale Law Journal (1898), favored the dissenting view.

An editorial published in the San Francisco Chronicle on March 30, 1898, expressed concern that the Wong Kim Ark ruling (issued two days previously) "may have a wider effect upon the question of citizenship than the public supposes"—specifically, that it might lead to citizenship and voting rights not only for Chinese but also Japanese and American Indians. The editorial suggested that "it may become necessary ... to amend the Federal Constitution and definitely limit citizenship to whites and blacks."

Due to the ruling, not only were children of Chinese immigrants confirmed to be US citizens, but under federal statute children born to US citizen fathers abroad were also entitled to US citizenship. At the time many sons of Chinese immigrants, including Wong Kim Ark, returned to China to find wives and start families, with their wives and children often remaining behind while they worked in the United States made occasional visits. With the ruling, many of these children now attempted to claim US citizenship in order to move to the United States.

The view of federal immigration officials was that the "Chinese are an undesirable addition to our society." As a result, the standard of evidence for a claim to US citizenship by Chinese claimants to be accepted was deliberately set to be difficult to meet, with the idea that "every presumption, every technicality and every intendment should be held against their admission, and their testimony should have little or no weight when standing alone." Any Chinese claiming birthright citizenship was required to produce at least two white witnesses to confirm the fact, after which claimants and witnesses would then be separately questioned on details of their lives. Children claiming citizenship by descent from fathers born in the United States would be asked hundreds of detailed questions about their hometowns, with their answers compared to those of their fathers, and undergo invasive physical examinations to determine their age and relationships to alleged relatives.

=== Wong Kim Ark and his family ===
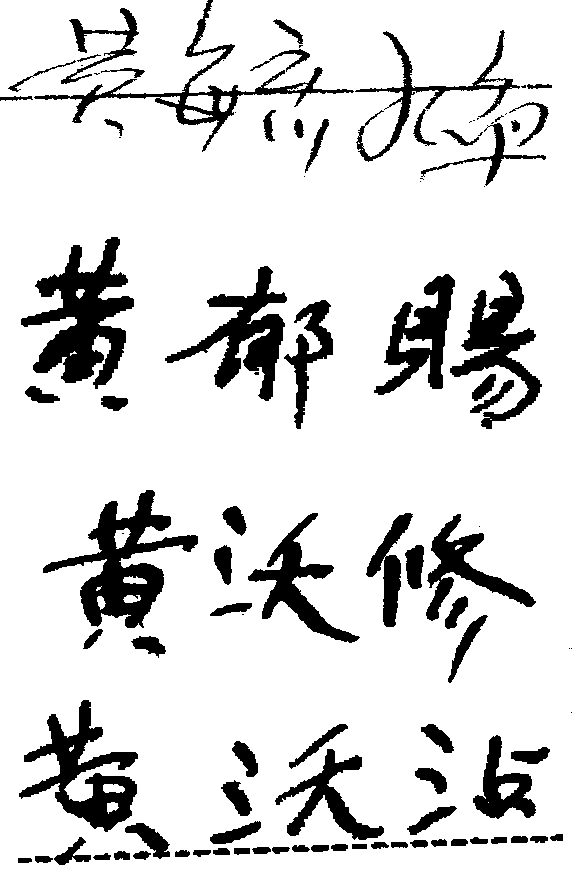
Signatures, on various U.S. immigration documents of Wong Yoke Fun (黃毓煥); Wong Yook Sue (黃郁賜); Wong Yook Thue (黃沃修); and Wong Yook Jim (黃沃沾)

In October 1901, Wong Kim Ark was again detained by immigration officials after attempting to return to the United States from Mexico. It is unclear why he had traveled to Mexico, though it is known that Chinese laborers were present there at that time. Upon crossing the border from Ciudad Juárez into El Paso, Texas, he was detained by Charles Mehan, the immigration official responsible for enforcing the Chinese Exclusion Act in El Paso. Mehan argued that Wong's presence in the US violated the act. He was freed on a $300 bond guaranteed by Mar Chew, listed as a restaurant owner in city directories, and R.F. Campbell, the mayor of El Paso from 1895 to 1897 and city's postmaster at the time. On February 18, 1902, Wong's potential deportation was dismissed by W.D. Howe, a federal commissioner for the Western District of Texas, at the request of federal prosecutors.

It is unknown how long Wong stayed in El Paso following the ruling, although a 1903 city directory lists a person with his name as living in a boarding house and working as a cook. He is documented as having visited China and then returned to San Francisco in 1905. He made another visit to China in 1913. In 1931, he again traveled to China. Although he filed a document indicating that he planned to return to the United States, he never did. It is unknown when he died.

As a result of Wong Kim Ark's U.S. citizenship being confirmed by the Supreme Court, Wong's eldest son, Wong Yoke Fun, came to the United States from China in 1910, seeking recognition as a citizen via jus sanguinis, but immigration officials accused him of being a paper son. Officials claimed to see discrepancies in the testimony at his immigration hearing and refused to accept Wong's claim that the boy was his son. He was deported and never returned to the United States. According to Amanda Frost, given that he wrote to Wong from detention asking for money and socks and remained involved with the family's life after his deportation, helping Wong Yook Jim immigrate, it is likely that he was indeed Wong's son. In 1924, Wong Hang Juen, presenting himself as Wong Yook Sue, arrived in the United States claiming to be Wong Kim Ark's son. He was initially refused entry but won an appeal and was allowed to stay. In 1960, he admitted through the Chinese Confession Program that he had lied about being Wong's son and had been admitted as a paper son. According to Frost, given his experiences with the US immigration system, "Wong may have decided that in a system in which legitimate claims of citizenship are routinely attacked or ignored, he had nothing to lose by claiming a paper son as his own." Wong Yook Thue and Wong Yook Jim subsequently came to the United States in the next two years following Wong Yook Sue's arrival. They managed to successfully establish themselves as Wong's sons and therefore as US citizens. According to historian Beatrice McKenzie, based on family data Wong Yook Jim might have actually been Wong's grandson. Because of his citizenship, Wong Yook Jim was drafted in World War II, and later made a career in the United States Merchant Marine.

=== Citizenship law since Wong Kim Ark ===
Current U.S. law on birthright citizenship (citizenship acquired at birth) acknowledges both citizenship through place of birth (jus soli) and citizenship inherited from parents (jus sanguinis). Before Wong Kim Ark, the Supreme Court had held in Elk v. Wilkins (1884) that birthplace by itself was not sufficient to grant citizenship to a Native American; however, Congress eventually granted full citizenship to Native Americans via the Indian Citizenship Act of 1924.

Restrictions on immigration and naturalization of Chinese were eventually lifted as a consequence of the Chinese Exclusion Repeal Act of 1943 (also known as the Magnuson Act) and the Immigration and Nationality Act of 1965.

=== Wong Kim Ark and later cases ===
In the years since Wong Kim Ark, the concept of jus soli citizenship has "never been seriously questioned by the Supreme Court, and [has] been accepted as dogma by lower courts". Citizenship cases since Wong Kim Ark have dealt mainly with situations falling outside the bounds of the Citizenship Clause—such as citizenship via jus sanguinis for foreign-born children of U.S. citizens, or circumstances under which U.S. citizenship may be lost.

The Wong Kim Ark court's affirmation of jus soli as the primary rule determining United States citizenship has been cited in several Supreme Court decisions affirming the citizenship of U.S.-born individuals of Chinese or Japanese ancestry. The court's holding that the language of the Constitution should be understood in light of the common law has been cited in numerous Supreme Court decisions dealing with the interpretation of the Constitution or acts of Congress. The Wong Kim Ark court's understanding of Fourteenth Amendment jurisdiction was also cited in a 1982 case involving the rights of illegal immigrants.

An unsuccessful effort was made in 1942 by the Native Sons of the Golden West to convince the Supreme Court to revisit and overrule the Wong Kim Ark ruling, in a case (Regan v. King) challenging the citizenship status of roughly 2,600 U.S.-born persons of Japanese ancestry. The plaintiffs' attorney termed Wong Kim Ark "one of the most injurious and unfortunate decisions" ever handed down by the Supreme Court and hoped the new case would give the court "an opportunity to correct itself". A federal district court and the Ninth Circuit Court of Appeals summarily rejected this contention, each citing Wong Kim Ark as a controlling precedent, and the Supreme Court declined to hear the case.

Federal appellate courts have repeatedly rejected attempts to cite the Wong Kim Ark opinion's use of the phrase citizenship by birth within the territory in support of claims that persons born in the Philippines during the period of its history when it was a United States possession were born in the U.S. (and thus entitled to U.S. citizenship via the Citizenship Clause).

=== Wong Kim Ark and children of illegal immigrants ===
Since the 1990s, controversy has arisen in some circles over the practice of granting automatic citizenship via jus soli to U.S.-born children of illegal aliens—controversially dubbed the "anchor baby" situation by some media correspondents and advocacy groups. Public debate over the issue has resulted in renewed discussion of the Wong Kim Ark decision.

Some legal scholars, opposed to the idea that jus soli should apply to the children of illegal aliens, have argued that the Wong Kim Ark precedent does not apply when alien parents are in the country illegally. John C. Eastman, a senior fellow at the Claremont Institute, has argued that Wong Kim Ark does not entitle U.S.-born children of illegal aliens to gain automatic citizenship because, in his opinion, being subject to the jurisdiction of the United States requires a status of "full and complete jurisdiction" that does not apply to aliens who are in the country illegally. Eastman further argues that the Wong Kim Ark decision was fundamentally flawed in the way it dealt with the concept of jurisdiction, and that the Indian Citizenship Act of 1924—which followed Wong Kim Ark—would not have been necessary if Congress had believed "that the Citizenship Clause confers citizenship merely by accident of birth." A similar analysis of the jurisdiction question has been proposed by Professor Peter H. Schuck of the Yale School of Law and Rogers M. Smith, political science professor at Yale. According to law professor Lino Graglia of the University of Texas, even if Wong Kim Ark settled the status of children of legal residents, it did not do so for children of illegal residents; Graglia asserts that the case weighs against automatic birthright for illegal immigrants because the Court denied such citizenship for an analogous group, namely "children of alien enemies, born during and within their hostile occupation".

Countering this view, Garrett Epps—a professor of law at the University of Baltimore—has stated that "In the case of United States v. Wong Kim Ark, the United States Supreme Court held that this guarantee [of birthright citizenship] applies to children of foreigners present on American soil, even if their parents are not American citizens and indeed are not eligible to become U.S. citizens." Epps further notes that "as a practical matter, the American-born children receive recognition of their citizenship regardless of the immigration status of their parents." In Epps' opinion, the sponsors of the Fourteenth Amendment "were unwavering in their insistence that the Citizenship Clause was to cover" the children of such "undesirable immigrants" as Chinese and Gypsies, and he views the Wong Kim Ark ruling as an "unexceptionable" matter of reading the drafters' intent.

Judge James C. Ho, appointed to the Fifth Circuit Court of Appeals in 2018, has expressed a similar view to that of Rodriguez, saying that "Birthright citizenship is guaranteed by the Fourteenth Amendment. That birthright is protected no less for children of undocumented persons than for descendants of Mayflower passengers." Ho also argues that those who claim the Citizenship Clause was not in fact intended to confer citizenship on the children of aliens are disregarding the substance of the 1866 Senate debate over the proposal to add this language to the Fourteenth Amendment.

The Supreme Court's 1982 Plyler v. Doe decision—in a case involving illegal alien children (i.e., children born abroad who had come to the United States illegally along with their parents, and who had no basis for claiming U.S. citizenship)—has also been cited in support of a broad application of Fourteenth Amendment jurisdiction to illegal aliens and their children. A Texas state law had sought to deny such children a public education, and the Texas government had argued that "persons who have entered the United States illegally are not 'within the jurisdiction' of a State even if they are present within a State's boundaries and subject to its laws." A dictum footnote in the Court's majority opinion remarked that according to Wong Kim Ark, the Fourteenth Amendment's phrases subject to the jurisdiction thereof (in the Citizenship Clause) and within its jurisdiction (in the Equal Protection Clause) were essentially equivalent; that both expressions referred primarily to physical presence and not to political allegiance; and that the Wong Kim Ark decision benefited the children of illegal as well as legal aliens. As a result, the court rejected the claim that Fourteenth Amendment "jurisdiction" depended on whether someone had entered the U.S. legally or not. Although the four dissenting justices disagreed with the opinion of the Court regarding whether the children in question had a right to a public education, the dissenters agreed with the majority regarding the applicability of Fourteenth Amendment jurisdiction to illegal aliens. James C. Ho considers Plyler v. Doe to have "put to rest" any doubt over whether the sweeping language regarding jurisdiction in Wong Kim Ark applies to all aliens, even illegal aliens.

The United States Department of State (the federal government agency responsible for international relations) considers U.S.-born children of illegal aliens to be subject to U.S. jurisdiction, and thus to have citizenship at birth. The State Department's Foreign Affairs Manual takes the position that this issue was settled by the Wong Kim Ark ruling.

Some legal scholars still argue that the Wong Kim Ark ruling should be overturned through legislative means. Richard Posner, a judge of the Seventh Circuit Court of Appeals, criticized (in 2003) the granting of citizenship to U.S.-born children of illegal immigrants, suggesting that Congress can and should act to change this policy. Charles Wood, former counsel to the Senate Judiciary Committee's subcommittee on immigration, has also opposed the practice, urging (in 1999) that it be stopped as quickly as possible, either by an act of Congress or a constitutional amendment.

However, in the words of Lucy Salyer, "the birthright citizenship doctrine of Wong Kim Ark has remained intact for over a century, still perceived by most to be a natural and well-established rule in accordance with American principles and practice. It is unlikely to be uprooted easily."

=== Legislative and executive attempts to overturn Wong Kim Ark ===
In response to public reaction against immigration and fears that U.S.-born children of illegal immigrants could serve as links to permit legal residency and eventual citizenship for family members who would otherwise be ineligible to remain in the country, bills have been introduced from time to time in Congress which have challenged the conventional interpretation of the Citizenship Clause and have sought (thus far unsuccessfully) to actively and explicitly deny citizenship at birth to U.S.-born children of foreign visitors or illegal aliens.

As one example among many, the "Birthright Citizenship Act of 2009"—introduced in the House of Representatives of the 111th Congress as H.R. 1868, by Representative Nathan Deal of Georgia—was an attempt to exclude U.S.-born children of illegal immigrants from being considered subject to the jurisdiction of the United States for purposes of the Citizenship Clause. A similar proposal—named the "Birthright Citizenship Act of 2011"—was introduced in the House as H.R. 140 in the (112th) Congress on January 5, 2011 by Representative Steve King of Iowa, and in the Senate as S. 723 on April 5, 2011 by Senator David Vitter of Louisiana. Neither bill was discussed in Congress prior to the end of the session.

Since an act of Congress challenging the accepted interpretation of the Citizenship Clause might very possibly be ruled unconstitutional by courts choosing to rely on Wong Kim Ark as a precedent, proposals have also been made to amend the Constitution so as to override the Fourteenth Amendment's language and deny citizenship to U.S.-born children of illegal aliens or foreign visitors. For example, Vitter introduced Senate Joint Resolution (S.J.Res.) 6 in the 111th Congress, but like H.R. 1868, it failed to reach the floor of either house of Congress before the 111th Congress adjourned on December 22, 2010. Vitter reintroduced this same proposed amendment as S.J.Res. 2 in the 112th Congress on January 25, 2011; it was not brought up for discussion or voted upon in either house of Congress.

In 2010 and 2011, state legislators in Arizona introduced bills proposing to deny regular birth certificates to children born in Arizona whose parents could not prove they were in the United States legally. Supporters of such legislation reportedly hoped their efforts would cause the issue of birthright citizenship for U.S.-born children of illegal aliens to reach the Supreme Court, possibly resulting in a new decision narrowing or overruling Wong Kim Ark.

On October 30, 2018, President Donald Trump announced his intention to issue an executive order abolishing birthright citizenship for U.S.-born children of non-citizens. On this same date, Senator Lindsey Graham of South Carolina said he would introduce legislation in Congress to accomplish the same thing. Jon Feere, of the Center for Immigration Studies (CIS), has said that "Several legal scholars and political scientists who have delved into the history of the 14th Amendment have concluded that 'subject to the jurisdiction thereof' has no plain meaning". Commenting on Trump's idea of an executive order, Speaker of the House Paul Ryan said "you obviously cannot do that .... I think in this case the 14th Amendment is pretty clear, and that would involve a very, very lengthy constitutional process." Mark Krikorian, executive director of the Center for Immigration Studies, said that if Trump follows through on his plan, "This will set up the court fight ... the order will be enjoined, [and the] case will eventually reach [the Supreme Court], which then will finally have to rule on the meaning of 'subject to the jurisdiction'." Neither Trump's promised executive order nor Graham's planned bill materialized before Trump left office in January 2021.

However, upon assuming office on January 20, 2025, Trump announced an executive order abolishing birthright citizenship for anyone born in the United States without a mother or father that was a U.S. citizen or lawful permanent resident. As of January 22, at least two federal court challenges have been filed against the executive order, one in Massachusetts by more than 20 state attorneys general led by Matthew Platkin, State of New Jersey, et al. v. Trump, and one in New Hampshire by the American Civil Liberties Union, New Hampshire Indonesian Community Support, et al. v. Trump. Norman Wong, the great-grandson of Wong Kim Ark, criticized the executive order. Lower courts placed national injunctions against the administration from enforcing the executive order. On appeal, in June 2025, the Supreme Court ruled in the consolidated case Trump v. CASA on a more narrow aspect related to the use of national injunctions, and did not address the Fourteenth Amendment question. In the wake of that decision, at least two of the lower court cases still held against the federal executive administration, using class actions to maintain the nationwide injunction on the executive order. Trump appealed to the Supreme Court in September 2025, specifically asking the court to review the Fourteenth Amendment. Twenty-five states filed an amicus brief supporting this position, arguing the interpretation of Wong Kim Ark was too broad and must be narrowed. On December 5, 2025, the Supreme Court agreed to hear Trump v. Barbara; oral arguments in this case were held on April 1, 2026, and Trump personally attended these arguments—the first time in history that a sitting president had ever done so. On June 30, 2026, the Supreme Court upheld the lower court decisions in the Barbara case, rejecting Trump's arguments and affirming the existing birthright citizenship precedent in a 6–3 decision. Chief Justice John Roberts' majority opinion in Barbara affirmed the findings of Wong Kim Ark.

== See also ==
- Birthright citizenship in the United States
- Chinese American history
- Indian Citizenship Act
- List of United States immigration legislation
- Nativism (politics)
- United States nationality law

== General and cited references ==
- Eastman, John C. (March 30, 2006). "From Feudalism to Consent: Rethinking Birthright Citizenship". Washington D.C.: The Heritage Foundation. Legal Issues, No. 18. Archived from the original on July 4, 2011.
- Elinson, Elaine; Yogi, Stan (2009). Wherever There's a Fight: How Runaway Slaves, Suffragists, Immigrants, Strikers and Poets Shaped Civil Liberties in California. Berkeley, CA: Heyday Books. ISBN 978-1-59714-114-7.
- Epps, Garrett (2010). "The Citizenship Clause: A 'Legislative History'". American University Law Review. 60 (2): 329–388.
- Glen, Patrick J. (Fall 2007). "Wong Kim Ark and Sentencia que Declara Constitucional la Ley General de Migración 285-04 in Comparative Perspective: Constitutional Interpretation, Jus Soli Principles, and Political Morality". University of Miami Inter-American Law Review. 39 (1): 67–109. JSTOR 40176768.
- Ho, James C. (2006). "Defining 'American': Birthright Citizenship and the Original Understanding of the 14th Amendment" (PDF). The Green Bag. 9 (4): 366. Archived from the original (PDF) on October 30, 2010.
- Nackenoff, Carol; Novkov, Julie (2021). American by birth: Wong Kim Ark and the battle for citizenship. Lawrence, Kansas: University Press of Kansas. ISBN 978-0-7006-3193-3.
- Rodriguez, Cristina M. (2009). "The Second Founding: The Citizenship Clause, Original Meaning, and the Egalitarian Unity of the Fourteenth Amendment". University of Pennsylvania Journal of Constitutional Law. 11: 1363–1371. Archived from the original on December 8, 2024.
- Salyer, Lucy E. (2005). "Wong Kim Ark: The Contest Over Birthright Citizenship". In Martin, David; Schuck, Peter (eds.). Immigration Stories. New York: Foundation Press. ISBN 1-58778-873-X.
- Semonche, John E. (1978). Charting the Future: The Supreme Court Responds to a Changing Society, 1890–1920. Westport, CT: Greenwood Press. ISBN 0-313-20314-8. LCCN 77-94745.
- "Foreign Affairs Manual, Volume 7 (7 FAM)". United States Department of State. August 21, 2009. Archived from the original on January 25, 2012.
- Woodworth, Marshall B. (1896). "Citizenship of the United States under the Fourteenth Amendment". American Law Review. 30. St. Louis: Review Pub. Company: 535–555.
- Woodworth, Marshall B. (1898). "Who Are Citizens of the United States? Wong Kim Ark Case". American Law Review. 32. St. Louis: Review Pub. Company: 554–561.
