= Washington v. Trump =

Washington v. Trump may refer to:

- Washington v. Trump (2017), a case challenging Executive Order 13769, the first Trump travel ban
- Washington v. Trump (2025), a case challenging Executive Order 14160, the executive order rejecting birthright citizenship to children of unauthorized immigrants and temporary visitors
