= Trump v. CASA, Inc. =

- Supreme Court of the United States

Argued May 15, 2025 Decided June 27, 2025
- Full case name: Donald J. Trump, President of the United States, et al., Applicants v. CASA, Inc., et al.
- Docket no.: 24A884
- Citations: 606 U.S. 831 (more)
- Argument: Oral argument
- Decision: Opinion

Questions presented
- Can a district court issue a nationwide (universal) injunction that blocks enforcement of a federal executive order beyond the specific parties involved in the lawsuit?

Holding
- Universal injunctions likely exceed the equitable authority that Congress has given to federal courts.

Court membership
- Chief Justice John Roberts Associate Justices Clarence Thomas · Samuel Alito; Sonia Sotomayor · Elena Kagan; Neil Gorsuch · Brett Kavanaugh; Amy Coney Barrett · Ketanji Brown Jackson

Case opinions
- Majority: Barrett, joined by Roberts, Thomas, Alito, Gorsuch, Kavanaugh
- Concurrence: Thomas, joined by Gorsuch
- Concurrence: Alito, joined by Thomas
- Concurrence: Kavanaugh
- Dissent: Sotomayor, joined by Kagan, Jackson
- Dissent: Jackson

Laws applied
- Judiciary Act of 1789

Trump v. CASA, Inc., 606 U.S. 831 (2025), is a United States Supreme Court case addressing whether lower-court judges have the authority to issue "universal injunctions" to block the enforcement of policies nationwide. On June 27, 2025, the court ruled in a 6–3 decision that universal injunctions exceed the judiciary power unless necessary to provide the formal plaintiff with "complete relief". Writing for the majority, Justice Amy Coney Barrett emphasized that "complete relief" for a plaintiff was distinct from "universal relief" impacting all similar situations nationwide.

While the case did not directly address birthright citizenship in the United States, it centered on several universal injunctions blocking Executive Order 14160, an order issued by President Donald Trump to redefine the government's understanding of the Citizenship Clause. Three district court judges issued universal preliminary injunctions to block the order nationwide while cases that they presided over proceeded through the legal system.

The government appealed each case to the Supreme Court, arguing that district judges should only be allowed to prevent a policy from taking effect for the specific challengers filing a given lawsuit. The Supreme Court consolidated the appeals into Trump v. CASA. In its ruling, the court issued partial stays on existing injunctions except for those that were parties to the cases.

The CASA opinion did not address the constitutionality of the birthright citizenship executive order and left open the ability for plaintiffs to pursue class-wide relief through class action lawsuits. In June 2026, the Supreme Court addressed the constitutionality of Executive Order 14160 in the case Trump v. Barbara.

== Background ==
As a presidential candidate, Donald Trump stated that he would end birthright citizenship in the United States. After his second inauguration, he signed Executive Order 14160, "Protecting the Meaning and Value of American Citizenship", which ordered all departments of the executive branch to refuse to recognize children born to illegal immigrants or visa holders as citizens. An estimated 150,000 such children are born in the United States each year.

The order was quickly blocked by multiple universal preliminary injunctions issued by district court judges. In addition to the three cases consolidated into Trump v. CASA, the executive order was also blocked by Judge Joseph Normand Laplante in New Hampshire Indonesian Community Support v. Trump. Including these orders, as of May 14, 2025 there had been 39 injunctions issued against the second Trump administration blocking actions such as mass federal employee layoffs, federal funding freezes, and deportations.

The administration viewed each injunction as judicial overreach and argued lower-court judges should only be allowed to block a contested policy from affecting the actual plaintiffs involved in the case. Neither side of the dispute briefed the Supreme Court justices on the constitutionality of Executive Order 14160.

== Lower court history ==
Eighteen states and two cities (San Francisco and Washington, D.C.) filed a lawsuit in the District Court for the District of Massachusetts as New Jersey v. Trump. Four other states filed a second lawsuit, Washington v. Trump, in the District Court for the Western District of Washington. A third lawsuit, by immigrant and asylum-seeker rights groups CASA de Maryland and the Asylum Seeker Advocacy Project, was filed in the District Court for the District of Maryland on behalf of five pregnant women.

Federal judges in each of the district courts issued preliminary injunctions to block the order from taking effect anywhere in the country. Judge John C. Coughenour, presiding over Washington v. Trump, called the order "blatantly unconstitutional". Government appeals challenging the injunctions were rejected by the Court of Appeals for the Ninth Circuit, the Court of Appeals for the Fourth Circuit, and the Court of Appeals for the First Circuit.

== U.S. Supreme Court ==
On April 17, the Supreme Court agreed to hear Trump v. CASA, consolidating it with Trump v. New Jersey and Trump v. Washington and setting oral arguments for May 15.

Oral arguments were heard on May 15, with the solicitor general of the United States, D. John Sauer, representing the administration; Kelsi B. Corkran, for the immigrant groups, including CASA; and Jeremy Feigenbaum, the solicitor general of New Jersey, for the various states.

=== Decision ===
On June 27, the Supreme Court ruled 6–3 that, “Universal injunctions likely exceed the equitable authority that Congress has given to federal courts."

Justice Amy Coney Barrett wrote the majority opinion. Barrett's opinion did not declare universal injunctions unconstitutional but concluded that they were an overreach based on the Judiciary Act of 1789 and inconsistent with "historical equitable practice". Barrett wrote that "the equitable relief available in the federal courts" should be akin to what was "'traditionally accorded by courts of equity'" at the time of the founding of the United States, quoting the Supreme Court's holding in Grupo Mexicano de Desarrollo, S.A. v. Alliance Bond Fund, Inc. (1999).

The court granted the government a partial stay of the injunctions blocking Executive Order 14160, but "only to the extent that the injunctions are broader than necessary to provide complete relief to each plaintiff with standing to sue." They specified that the executive order could not take effect until 30 days after the ruling.

Barrett acknowledged the importance of providing "complete relief" to plaintiffs seeking an injunction, but said "complete relief" was a narrower concept than "universal relief". Barrett wrote that a pregnant mother would receive complete relief as long as her own child was not denied citizenship. "Extending the injunction to cover all other similarly situated individuals would not render her relief any more complete," Barrett continued.

However, the court left it to the "lower courts [to] determine whether a narrower injunction is appropriate" with respect to the states suing the administration. The states had argued that only a universal injunction would provide them with complete relief, because tracking the immigration statuses and residences of parents moving between states before providing a newborn with mandated benefits would be administratively complex.

The court's ruling left open the ability for plaintiffs to seek widespread relief by filing class action lawsuits.

=== Concurrences ===
Justices Clarence Thomas, Samuel Alito, and Brett Kavanaugh filed concurrences. Justice Neil Gorsuch joined Thomas's concurrence and Thomas joined Alito's concurrence.

Thomas's concurrence explicitly stated that the court's decision ended the practice of district courts issuing universal injunctions and emphasized the need to create remedies specifically tailored to the parties in a case.

Kavanaugh wrote that plaintiffs may still request the "functional equivalent of a universal injunction" by filing "statewide, regionwide, or even nationwide" class action lawsuits.

Alito opined that the court's decision may be undermined if states assert third-party standing to obtain broad injunctions on behalf of their residents, or if district courts award injunctions to loosely defined classes in class action lawsuits. He urged lower courts to be vigilant against potential abuses of these methods.

=== Dissents ===
Justice Sonia Sotomayor filed a dissent which was joined by Justices Elena Kagan and Ketanji Brown Jackson. Sotomayor argued the government had avoided requesting a complete stay of the injunctions because doing so would require them to prove Executive Order 14160 was likely constitutional. She wrote, "The gamesmanship in this request is apparent, and the Government makes no attempt to hide it."

Jackson also filed a separate dissent, in which she wrote:

When the Government says 'do not allow the lower courts to enjoin executive action universally as a remedy for unconstitutional conduct,' what it is actually saying is that the Executive wants to continue doing something that a court has determined violates the Constitution—please allow this. That is some solicitation. With its ruling today, the majority largely grants the government's wish.

Barrett criticized Jackson's dissent, writing that "Justice Jackson decries an imperial Executive while embracing an imperial Judiciary."

== Subsequent legal action ==
Within hours of the Supreme Court ruling, CASA de Maryland filed a motion in their existing district court case in Maryland, asking Judge Deborah Boardman to certify a class of children born to immigrant parents who would be ineligible for birthright citizenship under Executive Order 14160. The American Civil Liberties Union filed another class action suit in New Hampshire the same day, which became known as Trump v. Barbara.

=== Trump v. Barbara ===
In September 2025, Trump filed a petition to the Supreme Court asking it to review the constitutionality of the executive order based on the Washington case and the ACLU case filed in New Hampshire. Twenty-five states, including Florida, Georgia, Texas, Tennessee, and Missouri, wrote an amicus brief urging the Supreme Court to take the case and to limit the interpretation of the Fourteenth Amendment from the prior court decision in the 1898 case United States v. Wong Kim Ark. The states argued that the court should use interpretation of the law from the Reconstruction era instead.

On December 5, 2025, the court granted the president’s petition for certiorari before judgment in Trump v. Barbara, bypassing the circuit court and accepting the case for review. It held oral arguments on April 1, 2026. On June 30, 2026, the court ruled that children born in the United States to parents unlawfully or temporarily present are "subject to the jurisdiction" of the United States and are citizens at birth under the Fourteenth Amendment’s Citizenship Clause, striking down the executive order.

== See also ==
- Garland v. Aleman Gonzalez
