= Washington v. Trump (2025) =

Lawsuit

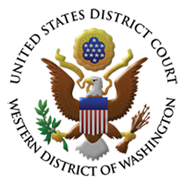
- Court: United States District Court for the Western District of Washington
- Full case name: State of Washington et al. v. Donald J. Trump et al.
- Argued: February 6, 2025 (preliminary injunction)
- Decided: February 6, 2025 (preliminary injunction granted)

Court membership
- Judge sitting: John C. Coughenour

Washington v. Trump is a lawsuit in the United States District Court for the Western District of Washington. The lawsuit was launched by the states of Washington, Arizona, Illinois and Oregon after President Donald Trump signed an executive order in January 2025 titled "Protecting the Meaning and Value of American Citizenship", which placed multiple restrictions on birthright citizenship in the United States, for allegedly violating the Fourteenth Amendment of the United States Constitution.

A preliminary injunction was issued blocking enforcement on February 6, 2025 and the United States Court of Appeals for the Ninth Circuit declined to lift that injunction on an emergency basis on February 19. The U.S. government appealed the injunction to the Supreme Court alongside two others in Trump v. CASA.

== Lawsuit history ==
=== Western District Court of Washington ===
On January 21, 2025, the states of Washington, Arizona, Illinois and Oregon sued Donald Trump claiming that the executive order which Donald Trump signed the day before and ends birthright citizenship in the United States, violates the Fourteenth Amendment of the United States Constitution.

Two days after the lawsuit was filed on January 23, 2025, Senior Judge John C. Coughenour granted a temporary restraining order against the executive order calling it "blatantly unconstitutional". The temporary restraining order expires 14 days after it was granted.

A hearing for a preliminary injunction to block the executive order was held February 6, 2025. The same day Judge Coughenour issued a preliminary injunction enjoining the enforcement of the executive order. The US Justice Department filed a notice it will appeal. The appeal will shift the matter to the 9th US Circuit Court of Appeals.

=== Ninth Circuit Court of Appeals ===
On February 7, 2025, the Justice Department appealed to the Ninth Circuit Court of Appeals. On February 19, a panel of three judges denied a request by the Justice Department to lift the preliminary injunction on an emergency basis, with the majority, Jimmy Carter appointee William Canby and George W. Bush appointee Milan Smith, doing so on the basis that the government had failed to prove that they were likely to succeed on the underlying merits. A concurrence by Trump appointee Danielle J. Forrest declined to rule on the probability of success on the merits, but found that mere delay did not justify an emergency order in this case and would decrease public confidence in the judiciary if made without the benefit of fuller arguments. The ruling, the first on the executive order by an appellate court, set the stage for a full hearing to be heard by the court in June 2025, pending any appeals to the Supreme Court.

On July 23, 2025, the Ninth Circuit again affirmed the universal preliminary injunction but only because it was found necessary to give state plaintiffs complete relief.

=== Supreme Court of the United States ===
On March 13, 2025, the acting Solicitor General of the United States, Sarah M. Harris, filed an application for a partial stay of the injunction issued by the District Court.

On April 17, 2025, the Supreme Court deferred the application pending oral argument. The case was consolidated with Trump v. Casa, Inc. and Trump v. New Jersey. Oral arguments were heard on May 15, 2025.
