= Executive Order 14160 =

2025 order against birthright citizenship

- "Protecting the Meaning and Value of American Citizenship"
- Front page of Executive Order 14160
- Type: Executive order
- Number: 14160
- President: Donald Trump
- Signed: January 20, 2025

Federal Register details
- Federal Register document number: 2025-02007
- Publication date: January 20, 2025

Repealed by
- Trump v. Barbara, 609 U.S. ___ (2026).

Executive Order 14160, titled "Protecting the Meaning and Value of American Citizenship", is an executive order signed by Donald Trump, the 47th president of the United States, on January 20, 2025. The executive order challenged the prevailing interpretation of the Citizenship Clause of the 14th Amendment to the United States Constitution, aiming to end birthright citizenship in the United States for children of unauthorized immigrants as well as immigrants legally but temporarily present in the U.S., such as those on student, work, or tourist visas.

The order was swiftly challenged in court by multiple organizations and states, being blocked by multiple federal judges.

On June 30, 2026, the order was declared unconstitutional by the United States Supreme Court.

== Provisions ==
Trump's executive order seeks to redefine how the Fourteenth Amendment's clause "and subject to the jurisdiction thereof" should be interpreted.

The executive order states two different situations where a person is no longer a U.S. citizen at birth.

- When the mother was unlawfully present in the U.S. and the father was neither a U.S. citizen nor a lawful permanent resident when the person was born.
- When the mother was in the U.S. in temporary status, such as a student visa, work visa, tourist visa or under the Visa Waiver Program, and the father was neither a U.S. citizen nor a lawful permanent resident when the person was born.

The executive order states that these provisions are only effective for people born 30 days or more after the date of the order; it would have only applied to children born beginning February 19, 2025 had it not been blocked.

After the Supreme Court lifted the block, the order was set to go into effect on July 27, 2025; however, it was again blocked on July 10.

== Legal challenges ==
At least ten lawsuits challenging the executive order have been brought by various plaintiffs, including 22 U.S. state attorneys general, civil liberties and immigrants rights groups, and pregnant women. As of February 2025, four federal judges have issued preliminary injunctions blocking its implementation and enforcement nationwide. On March 13, the Trump administration made emergency applications to the Supreme Court, asking it to narrow those court orders. In these appeals, the government argued for its position on birthright citizenship. On April 17, the Supreme Court said it would hear arguments in May.

=== State of Washington v. Trump ===
On January 21, Attorney General of Washington Nick Brown filed suit against the Trump administration in the United States District Court for the Western District of Washington, arguing that the order violates the 14th Amendment and federal immigration law. The lawsuit was joined by Arizona, Oregon, and Illinois. It was the first of the lawsuits to get a hearing in court, when on January 23, Judge John C. Coughenour issued a temporary block on the order, calling it "blatantly unconstitutional." On February 6, 2025, Coughenour granted a preliminary injunction enjoining enforcement of the order, while accusing Trump of circumventing or ignoring the rule of law for personal or political gain. The Department of Justice appealed the ruling later that day. The appeal was heard by the Court of Appeals for the 9th Circuit. On February 19, the appellate panel, the first to make a ruling on the executive order, denied to lift the preliminary injunction on an emergency basis, with the majority citing the unlikelihood of success on the underlying merits, setting the stage for fuller hearings in June 2025, pending an appeal to the Supreme Court.

=== CASA Inc. v. Trump ===
A second lawsuit was filed in a Maryland federal court by immigrant and asylum-seeker rights groups CASA and the Asylum Seeker Advocacy Project on behalf of five pregnant women. On February 5, US district judge Deborah Boardman issued a nationwide preliminary injunction, saying the order "conflicts with the plain language of the 14th Amendment, contradicts 125-year old binding Supreme Court precedent and runs counter to our nation's 250-year history of citizenship by birth" and was "likely to be found unconstitutional." Attorneys for the Department of Justice appealed the ruling to the Court of Appeals for the 4th Circuit on February 11, the second such appeal in cases related to the executive order after the appeal in State of Washington v. Trump.

=== New Hampshire Indonesian Community Support v. Trump ===
The executive order was challenged in court by the American Civil Liberties Union and the Asian Law Caucus in the case New Hampshire Indonesian Community Support v. Trump. On February 10, Judge Joseph N. Laplante of the U.S. District Court of New Hampshire became the third federal judge to issue an injunction blocking the order.

=== State of New Jersey v. Trump ===
On January 21, a lawsuit challenging the order was filed in the United States District Court for the District of Massachusetts by eighteen state attorneys general and the cities of San Francisco and Washington, D.C., led by Attorney General of New Jersey Matthew J. Platkin. On February 13, U.S. district judge Leo Sorokin became the fourth federal judge to block the executive order, issuing a nationwide preliminary injunction. In the ruling, he wrote that the Constitution "confers birthright citizenship broadly, including to persons within the categories described" by the executive order.

=== Supreme Court ===
The Supreme Court granted certiorari to the three cases involving CASA, Inc., Washington, and New Jersey on April 17, 2025, consolidating them for oral arguments on May 15, 2025. The Supreme Court declined to stay any of the current orders from the lower courts in accepting the case. The case is expected to be limited to the jurisdiction of the federal district courts in placing nationwide injunctions, rather than on the question of the constitutionality of the executive order. C-SPAN requested that the Supreme Court allow it to televise the proceedings, which has never been allowed before; the court did not do so. On June 27, the Supreme Court ruled that the lower courts could not use injunctions to block the implementation of the orders nationwide so long as court cases regarding the orders remained ongoing, but could only use these injunctions to shield the specific plaintiffs involved in the cases.

=== Trump v. Barbara ===
Considering class actions the best means to challenge the order following the Supreme Court's ruling in Trump v. CASA, the ACLU filed a lawsuit asking the United States District Court for the District of New Hampshire to grant a class-wide injunction blocking enforcement upon those who would not qualify for birthright citizenship under the executive order. CASA de Maryland filed a similar motion as well.

On July 10, 2025, Judge Joseph Normand Laplante granted the ACLU's request, certified a class of born and unborn babies who would be deprived of their citizenship per the administration's policy, and issued a preliminary injunction blocking the order from being enforced upon that class.

On November 21, the Supreme Court held a private meeting to decide whether to hear the Trump administration's appeals of the lower court rulings that blocked the executive order. On December 5, the court agreed to hear the administration's appeals. Oral arguments were heard on April 1, 2026. On June 30, 2026, the Supreme Court ruled that the executive order was unconstitutional.

== See also ==
- List of executive orders in the second presidency of Donald Trump
- United States v. Wong Kim Ark (1898)
