= Look Tin Eli =

Chinese-American businessman (1870–1919)

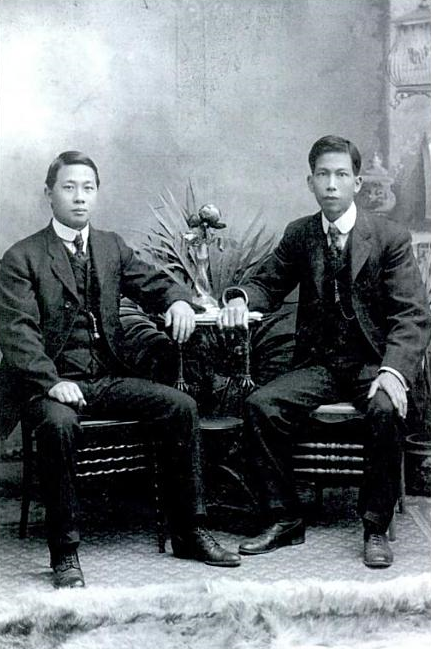
Look Tin Eli (left) and Look Poong-San, largest stockholder of Canton Bank

Look Tin Eli (1870–1919) (Chinese: 陸潤卿, Lù Rùnqīng; also Luk Tin-Sun, Look Tin Sing) was a Chinese-American businessman, born in Mendocino, California, who achieved much success in San Francisco's Chinatown, especially after the 1906 earthquake.

== Mendocino beginnings ==
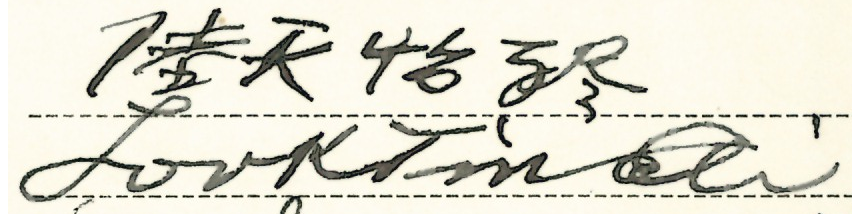
1910 signatures: phoneticized Look Tin Eli in Cantonese

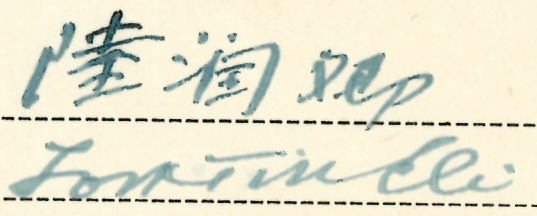
1918 signatures: used Chinese name 陸潤卿

Look Tin Eli (childname of Look Tin Sing) was born on May 5, 1870, above his father's general store, Quong Wo, a central commercial hub for Chinese laborers operated on the south side of Mendocino's Main Street in the redwood industry. His name change was a strategic business decision influenced by the Chinese Exclusion Act of 1882, where essentially Chinese merchants were given legal privileges that were barred from "laborers", making a merchant identity vital for Look Tin Eli's professional survival. Look Tin Eli was the firstborn of four children of his Chinese merchant family (陸 Lù, Luk or Loke in Cantonese). His father, Luk Bing-Tai (also known as Eli Tia Key), immigrated from Heung-san (香山), China, and was married to Su Wang. At the age of 9, Look Tin Eli was sent to China in 1879 prior to the 1882 Chinese Exclusion Act to learn the Chinese language and culture.

== In re Look Tin Sing ==
Upon his return to San Francisco in 1884, Look was denied entry back into the United States because he lacked the legal certificate required by the new 1882 law which restricted Chinese immigration. Despite only being 14 at the time, Eli had spent five years in China receiving traditional classical education which provided him with the elite cultural status and literacy that signaled to the U.S. court system that he belonged to the "merchant class". With this, Look challenged the 1882 law at the federal level and moved his legal team to advocate for his re-entry at the U.S. Circuit Court of San Francisco. More importantly, the U.S. Circuit Court did not ignore Eli's case, as was the common theme for many immigrants at the time, because it was influenced by the Chinese Six companies as a "test trial" to challenge the exclusion of native-born Chinese Americans such as Look. The company hired prominent white attorneys, including Thomas Riordan, a San Francisco attorney who often represented Chinese clients in immigration cases, and former U.S. Senator William M. Stewart, prominent railroad attorney and former attorney general of California, to ensure the case reached the highest levels of the judiciary. Look was selected specifically as a political tactic because his 14-year old status and his birth on U.S. soil made him a perfect case to force a ruling on the 14th Amendment. The 1884 ruling by Justice Stephen Field, who previously declared that children born in U.S. jurisdictions were U.S. citizens regardless of ancestry, was a pivotal decision that preceded and later cited at the landmark 1898 U.S. Supreme Court citizenship case, United States v. Wong Kim Ark.

"Look Tin Sing is my childhood name." -- Look Tin Eli (1910)

After completing his education, he took over the management of what was his father's store, which had been sold in 1881. Reportedly, Look Tin Eli and his younger brother Lee Eli "capably ran the Mendocino store in the 1890s". As a merchant, Look Tin Eli visited China twice, returning to the U.S. in July 1891 and November 1895.

== San Francisco career ==
In the 1890s, Look Tin Eli, with his China-born wife (surname Jeong) and one child, moved to San Francisco.

In February 1904, Tin Eli, with his younger brother, Lee Eli (also known as Look Poong-San), as his assistant, helped establish a San Francisco branch of the Russo-Chinese Bank at 417 Montgomery Street, the only branch in the United States. He was the "confidential adviser to the bank" and managed the Chinese negotiations and loans, abroad and locally.

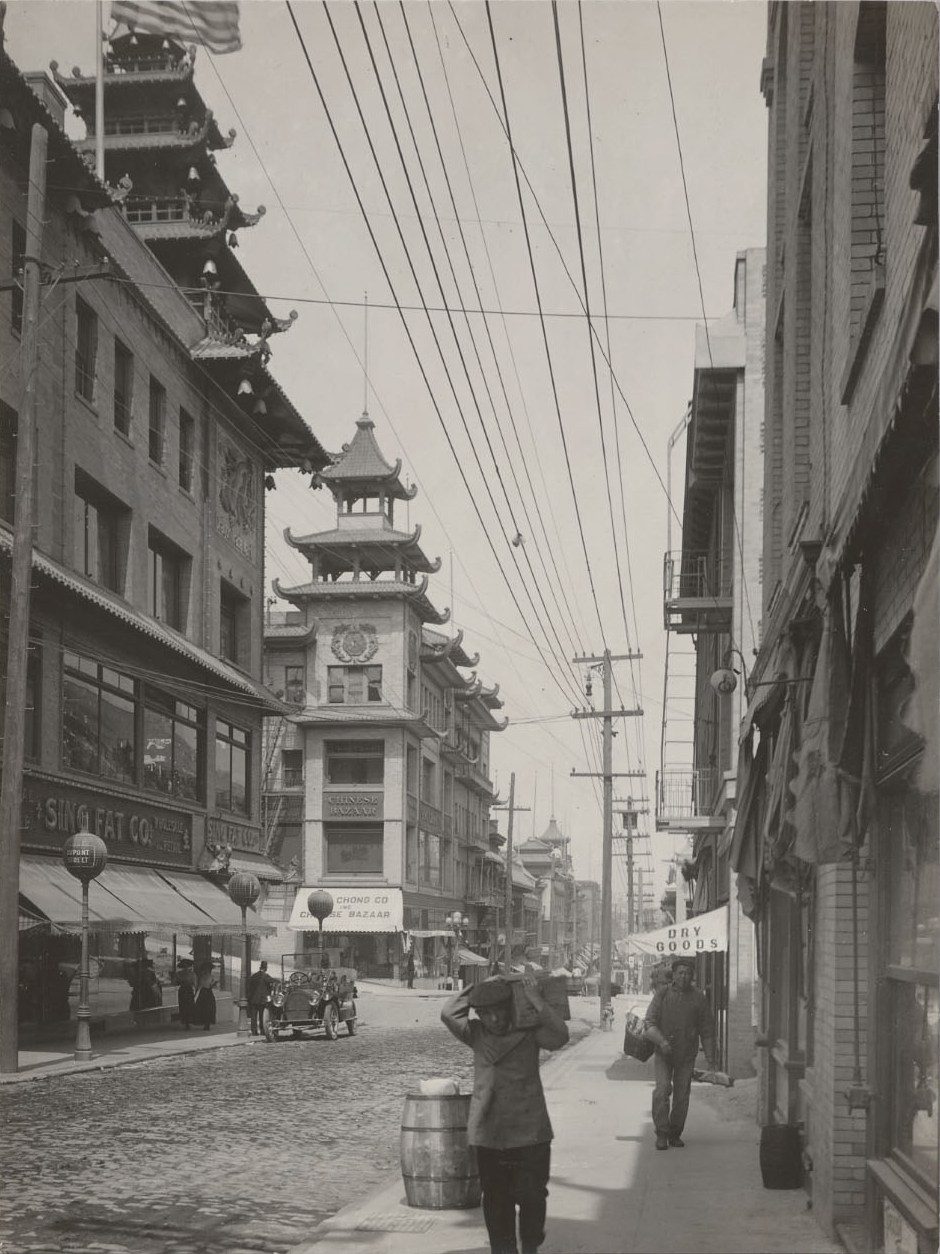
c.1910: post-quake rebuild

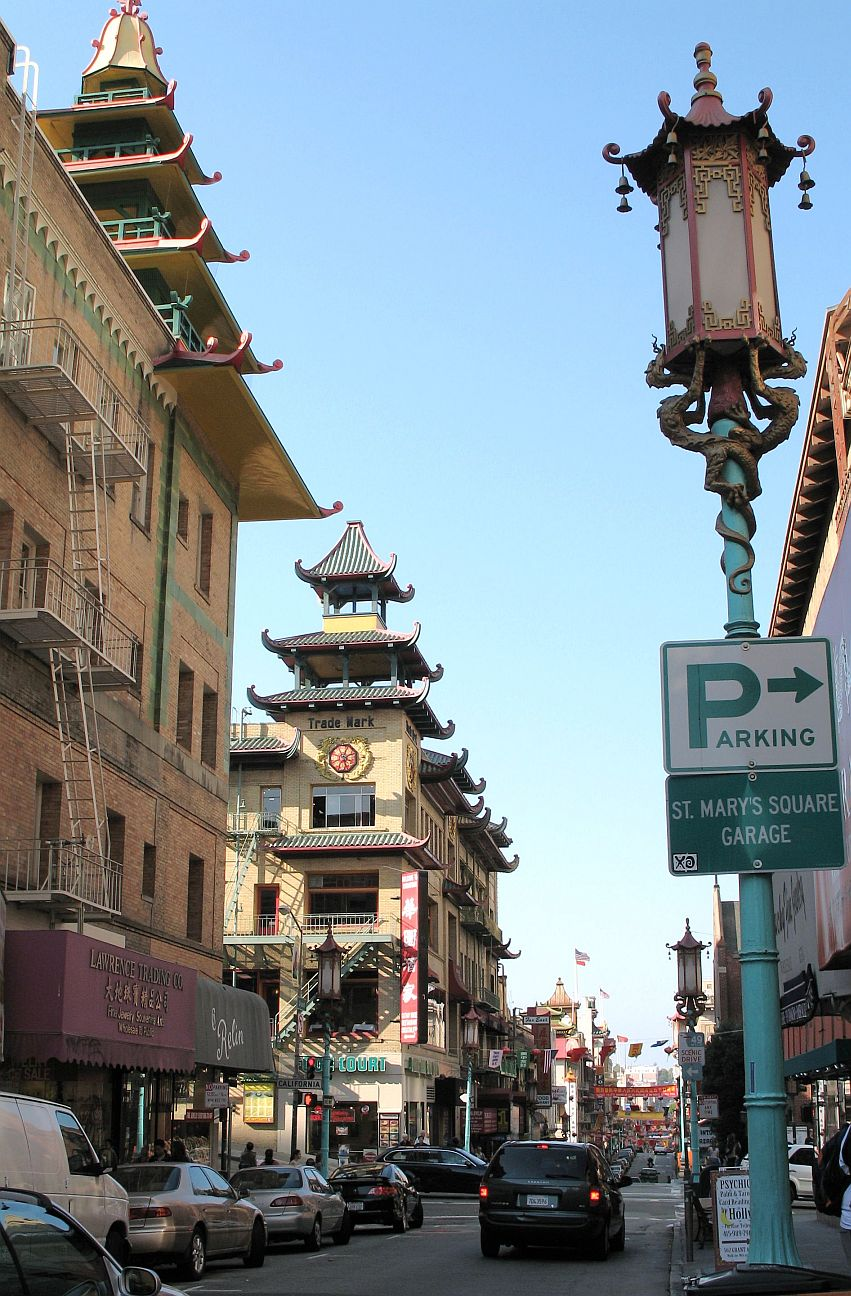
2006: 100 years after quake

Looking north along Grant from the intersection of Grant and Pine. The distinctive pagoda-topped roofs of the Sing Fat and Sing Chong buildings on the left side of each picture are icons of San Francisco's Chinatown.

After the 1906 San Francisco earthquake and fire destroyed Chinatown, including the Russo-Chinese Bank, Look Tin Eli became "the public face of the post-quake rebuilding of Chinatown." As general manager of the Sing Chong bazaar, he articulated a vision of post-quake Chinatown as an "ideal Oriental City." Already a skilled negotiator, he secured substantial loans from his Hong Kong and Canton partners for the rebuilding and persuaded Chinese merchants to hire western architects to rebuild Chinatown in an "Oriental" style in order to promote tourism and social change. In this way, his grand vision of "veritable fairy palaces filled with the choicest treasures of the Orient" was realized by the design (by T. Paterson Ross) and construction of the pagoda-topped buildings of the Sing Chong and Sing Fat bazaars on the west corners of Grant Ave (then Dupont St) and California St, which have since become icons of San Francisco Chinatown.

While Eli did not hold a proper business degree, he mastered transnational commerce through his family's mercantile network. His interest in architectural development and design after the 1906 earthquake was not driven by a desire to preserve or promote authentic Chinese culture, but rather a calculated embrace of racial sensationalism as a tool for political defense. To revent city officials from relocating the community of Chinatown to Hunter's point, Look collaborated with Western white architects T. Paterson Ross and A.W. Burgren, neither of whom had ever visited the region of Guangdong, a Chinese city from which many immigrants in Chinatown had come from. Together, they designed buildings such as the Sing Chong Building, using ideal imaginations of what Westerns typically thought China looked like. They included theatrical pagoda towers and vibrant colors that fed the stereotypical imagery of Chinese architectural heritage. Instead of a desire for social assimilation, this was a strategy of "Strategic Orientalism" where Look deliberately fed the stereotype to transform Chinatown into a tourist destination so it would become too economically valuable for the city to destroy.

Some historians have questioned whether or not Look intended to reflect actual Chinese aesthetics in his design of the new Chinatown. Architectural analysis has suggested that the post-1906 designs were a hybrid of Western architectural elements and "Stage-China" ornamentation. Look's collaborators utilized motifs like flared leaves and pagoda towers, which were more commonly observed in Northern Chinese palaces than the Southern Cantonese villages such as Guangdong. This implies that the design was less an attempt at cultural preservation or representation of the heritage of the immigrants, and more a calculated "identity performance" designed to appeal to the Western audience and secure the region's economic future.

In 1907, Tin Eli also helped found and operate, in partnership with cannery magnate Lew Hing, the Canton Bank of San Francisco (金山廣東銀行), the first Chinese-owned bank in the United States. For a brief period of time, it was the only bank to provide the Chinese community with financial resources to rebuild Chinatown. A year later, the Canton Bank of San Francisco was the principal bank for more than 100,000 Chinese individuals in the United States and in Mexico. The largest individual stockholder was Look Poong-San, Look Tin Eli's brother, who later became a wealthy banker in China.

According to the San Francisco Chronicle, Look Tin Eli was able in 1908 to persuade the chief of police to allow fireworks permit for Chinese New Year festivities, gaining support from the white merchants as well. The reconstruction of the post-quake Chinatown was thus completed in 1908, a year ahead of the rest of the City of San Francisco.

"Greater San Francisco may well be proud of its new Chinatown... for it is the one distinguishing mark which proclaims her different from any other great city in the whole civilized world. And the Chinese residents of the city are certainly deserving of unstinted praise for the pluck and courage they have shown in the rehabilitation of their particular quarter, which the united press of San Francisco declared could never be resuscitated." --Look Tin Eli (1910)

In 1910, the Chinese Chamber of Commerce sent him, along with Ng Poon Chew from the Chinese Six Companies, to Washington DC to object, after the fact and to no avail, to the relocation of the immigration station from the shed on pier 40 in San Francisco to Angel Island.

In October 1914, as president of the Canton Bank, he hosted 300 guests in a grand "red egg feast", expanding the custom traditionally reserved for male babies, to celebrate the one-month birthday of his new granddaughter, with the governor of the Federal Reserve Bank among those bringing congratulations.

In 1915, in response to Pacific Mail Steamship Company withdrawing service to the Orient, a group of Chinese-American businessmen organized the China Mail Steamship Company (中國郵船公司), the first Chinese-owned steamship company in the United States, and elected Look Tin Eli as its founding president.

== Later life and legacy ==
Throughout his career, Look Tin Eli worked closely with his younger brother, Lee Eli. While Look Tin Eli was the public face of the Chinatown community, Lee Eli had managed the transnational capital that made their plans possible. Look Tin Eli's life ended under veiled circumstances; after receiving threats from the Tong (Chinese organized crime groups) related to his leadership of the Steamship Company, he had no choice but to flee California. He died shortly after in 1919 at the age of 49, leaving behind a redesigned Chinatown that was built on its own "foreignness" to secure its place in the American landscape.
