= We Are CASA =

Immigration organization in Maryland, US

Coordinates: 38.998193°N 76.9942981°W

- Formation: 1985
- Founded: February 28, 1985; 41 years ago (as Central American Solidarity Association of Maryland)
- Tax ID no.: 52-1372972
- Legal status: 501(c)(3) nonprofit organization
- Headquarters: Silver Spring, Maryland, U.S.
- Services: Employment and workforce development; legal services; community organization; communication with political leaders
- Executive director: George Escobar
- President: Rima Matsumoto
- Subsidiaries: CASA Wheaton Workers' Center LLC, CASA in Action Inc., CASA Baltimore Neighborhood Center LLC, CDMBNC LLC
- Revenue: $25,725,278 (2022)
- Expenses: $16,359783 (2022)
- Employees: 358 (2021)
- Website: wearecasa.org
- Formerly called: Central American Solidarity Association of Maryland; CASA of Maryland, Inc.; CASA de Maryland

We Are CASA (formerly CASA and CASA de Maryland) is a Latino and immigration advocacy-and-assistance organization based in Maryland. It is active throughout the state, but has major foci in Prince George's County, Montgomery County and Baltimore. CASA influences Maryland politics on a wide range of policies, ranging from law-enforcement to education. It also has offices in Virginia, Pennsylvania, and Georgia.

== History ==
CASA was originally known as the "Central American Solidarity Association of Maryland". The organization's name was officially changed to CASA of Maryland, Inc., on July 28, 1995. The organization's name was officially changed to CASA de Maryland, Inc., on September 4, 2008. Now, the organization is named CASA.

CASA was founded in 1985 in the basement of the Takoma Park Presbyterian Church by US citizens and Central American immigrants. It has since expanded its scope. It is affiliate organization of the National Council of La Raza. They are a member of the National Day Laborer Organizing Network. CASA is also a founding member of the National Capital Immigration Coalition, which promotes "comprehensive immigration reform".

In November 2008, CASA filed a Public Information Act lawsuit alleging that the Frederick County Sheriff's Office violated the Constitution and engaged in racial profiling by performing immigration law enforcement functions under section 287(g) of the Immigration and Nationality Act.

In June 2010, CASA opened a 20,000-square-foot (1,900 m^{2}) multicultural center in the heart of Langley Park and located in the former Langley Park mansion. The project was budgeted at $31 million in 2007. Governor Martin O'Malley, a Democrat, said at the fundraising kickoff for the project, "In our Maryland, there's no such thing as a spare American".

In October 2023, amid the Gaza war, CASA released a statement expressing solidarity with Palestinians and calling for an immediate ceasefire, and ended with the line, "Free Palestine NOW!". CASA later retracted their statement on the war following criticism and issued an apology. In an interview with Maryland Matters, CASA's executive director Gustavo Torres repeatedly expressed remorse and regret over the statement, but defended the statement by saying that CASA weighing in on the war in Gaza was consistent with its mission of "speaking out for humanity and peace". CASA released a formal apology for the statement on November 16.

On January 30, 2026, CASA rebranded to "We Are CASA".

In September 2026, the group filed a lawsuit against ICE for making warrantless arrests.

== Activity ==
CASA offers health assistance, medical interpretations, English classes, financial literacy classes, vocational training, social services, leadership development, legal services, and employment placement for low-income families, particularly Latino immigrants and other immigrants. CASA provides legal support to the large and growing community of immigrants—documented or otherwise—in the greater Washington, D.C. metropolitan area. They have successfully promoted a wide range of legislation in support of the immigrant community, including a Maryland law that requires reasonable access to government services for people with limited English proficiency. CASA is very aggressive in pursuing absconding employers, contractors who do not pay their day-laborers.

CASA is also involved in housing law and advocacy. In 2004, CASA attorney Kimberley A. Propeack told the Daily Record that the group's housing attorney represents immigrants who are targeted by landlords if they raise concerns or try to form residents' associations. CASA has rescued a number of victims of domestic slavery, also known as human trafficking.

CASA was one of the leading plaintiffs in the Supreme Court case Trump v. CASA, in which they sued the administration on their attempt to end birthright citizenship. CASA represented a group of a five pregnant women in the case.

=== Day labor centers ===
CASA operates five day labor centers throughout the state of Maryland, with public and private funding; three centers are in Montgomery County. These centers, run by CASA on behalf of the county government under contract, provide central sites where contractors can pick up day-laborers. The centers have sparked protests and counter-protests. The center near Shady Grove was damaged by a fire within its first month of operation; the fire was ruled to be arson and classified a "hate incident" by county police. The centers allow day laborers to seek work without violating Gaithersburg's anti-solicitation ordinance, a law that makes it a misdemeanor to conduct hires in public places. Most of the opposition centers around the assumption that many of the day-laborers in Montgomery County are undocumented workers, mostly from Central America.

CASA opened an employment center in Baltimore on December 20, 2007. The center is funded by foundations and Community Development Block Grant funds; renovation of the building housing the center was funded by the City of Baltimore and an anonymous donor. According to Maryland Secretary of the Department of Labor, Licensing and Regulation, Thomas Perez, "Labor centers are the most cost-effective investment of government money I can imagine ... We're providing employment, addressing public safety by creating an orderly process, keeping people from street corners and protecting workers." The opening was applauded by local labor groups, immigrant advocates, and city leaders. Local residents had been pushing for an alternative to street-corner hiring.

CASA advocates for citizenship for migrant farmworkers in Maryland.

=== Deportation of Kilmar Abrego Garcia ===
CASA has been deeply involved in advocating for Kilmar Abrego Garcia’s return to the US. Kilmar is a member of CASA. Kilmar was removed from the US to El Salvador where he was placed in a prison despite never having been charged or convicted of any crime in either the US or El Salvador. The US government has stated that Kilmar is a high ranking member of the Salvadoran MS-13 gang.

Kilmar had been granted a withholding of removal specifically prohibiting his removal to his home country El Salvador due to the high likelihood that he would be in danger there. Kilmar's wife, Jennifer Vasquez Sura, sued the US government to obtain Kilmar's return. On June 6, 2025, the Trump administration brought Abrego Garcia back to the US, and the DOJ announced that he had been indicted in Tennessee for "conspiracy to unlawfully transport illegal aliens for financial gain" and "unlawful transportation of illegal aliens for financial gain."

The organization has mobilized community support, organized rallies, launched petitions, and facilitated meetings between Garcia’s family and lawmakers. CASA’s legal team has also played a direct role in the litigation, with one of its advocates serving as co-counsel for Kilmar’s wife. The group has worked to amplify the voices of Garcia’s family, to try and keep his case in the public eye despite government resistance.

== Funding ==
As of FY 2022, CASA received $13 million in contributions & grants; $12 million in program service revenue; and $81,000 in investment income. $11 million of the program service revenue was from government contracts.

Historically, CASA has received funding from a variety of sources, including a two-year grant funding operations in Baltimore from George Soros' Open Society Institute in 2001. In 2008, CASA received $1.5 million from oil company Citgo to fund educational, training, and economic-development programs.

== See also ==
- League of United Latin American Citizens
