= Amanda Frost =

American legal scholar

- Frost in 2026

Academic background
- Education: Harvard University (A.B., J.D.)

Academic work
- Discipline: U.S. immigration and citizenship law, federal courts
- Institutions: University of Virginia School of Law, American University Washington College of Law

Amanda Frost is an American law professor and scholar of immigration and citizenship law, constitutional law, federal courts and jurisdiction, and judicial ethics. She is the David Lurton Massee, Jr., professor of law at the University of Virginia School of Law and the director of its Immigration, Migration and Human Rights Program. Before 2022 she was the Ann Loeb Bronfman distinguished professor of law and government at the American University Washington College of Law.

Frost is the author of You Are Not American: Citizenship Stripping from Dred Scott to the Dreamers (2021). The book was short-listed for the Mark Lynton History Prize.

== Education and career ==
Frost graduated from Harvard College with a bachelor of arts degree cum laude in history and literature of America in 1993. In 1997, she graduated from Harvard Law School with a juris doctor degree magna cum laude.

Following law school, she worked for a year as a law clerk for Judge A. Raymond Randolph of the U.S. Court of Appeals for the D.C. Circuit. She worked as a staff attorney for five years for Public Citizen, interrupted by a year spent as a Fulbright scholar.

In 2004 she started teaching at the American University Washington College of Law, becoming an associate professor in 2006, a tenured professor in 2010, and a distinguished professor in 2020. During the summer of 2006 she worked as a legislative fellow for the Senate Judiciary Committee, at the time chaired by Senator Ted Kennedy. In 2022 she moved to the University of Virginia School of Law as the David Lurton Massee, Jr., professor of law.
