= Deborah Boardman =

American federal judge (born 1974)

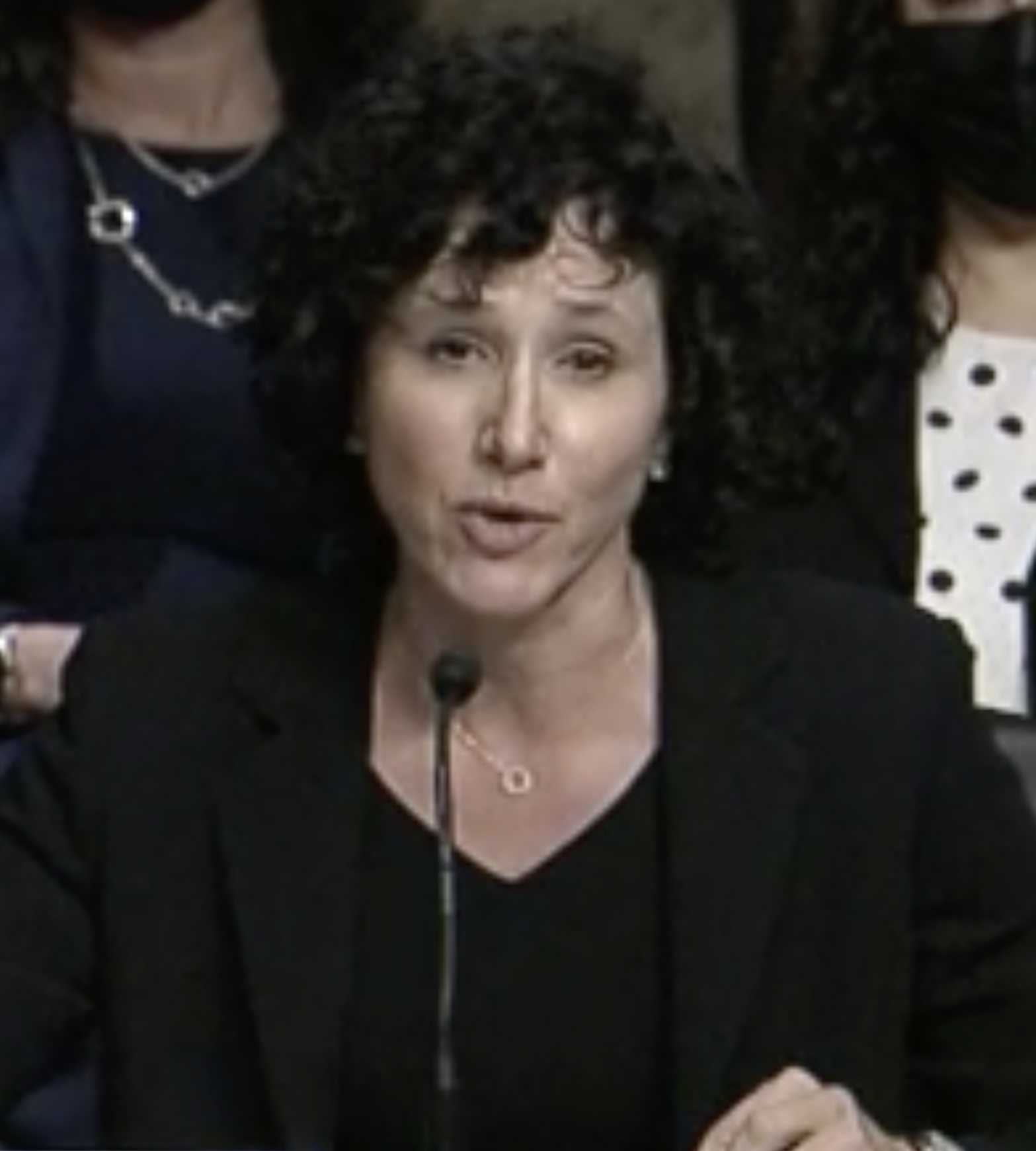

Judge of the United States District Court for the District of Maryland
- Incumbent
- Assumed office June 25, 2021
- Appointed by: Joe Biden
- Preceded by: Richard D. Bennett

Magistrate Judge of the United States District Court for the District of Maryland
- In office September 25, 2019 – June 25, 2021
- Preceded by: Stephanie A. Gallagher
- Succeeded by: Brendan Hurson

Personal details
- Born: 1974 (age 51–52) Silver Spring, Maryland, U.S.
- Education: Villanova University (BA); University of Virginia (JD)

Deborah Lynn Boardman (born 1974) is an American lawyer and jurist serving since 2021 as a United States district judge of the U.S. District Court for the District of Maryland. She was a United States magistrate judge for the District of Maryland from 2019 to 2021.

== Early life and education ==
Boardman was born in 1974 in Silver Spring, Maryland, and grew up in Frederick, Maryland. She is of Palestinian descent on her mother's side. She graduated summa cum laude from Villanova University in 1996 with a Bachelor of Arts. From 1996 to 1997, Boardman was a Fulbright Scholar in Amman, Jordan. She then attended the University of Virginia School of Law, where she was an editor of the Virginia Law Review. She graduated in 2000 with a Juris Doctor.

== Legal career ==
From 2000 to 2001, Boardman was a law clerk to U.S. District Judge James C. Cacheris of the U.S. District Court for the Eastern District of Virginia. From 2001 to 2008, she worked as an associate at Hogan & Hartson (now Hogan Lovells) in Washington, D.C., where she was selected to serve as the senior associate in the pro bono department. From 2008 to 2019, she served at the Federal Public Defender's Office for the District of Maryland, including four years as the first assistant federal public defender.

== Federal judicial service ==
=== United States magistrate judge service ===
On September 23, 2019, Boardman was selected to be a United States magistrate judge of the District of Maryland. She was sworn into office on September 25. Her service as a magistrate judge was terminated when she was sworn in as a district court judge.

=== District court service ===
On March 30, 2021, President Joe Biden announced his intent to nominate Boardman to serve as a United States district judge of the United States District Court for the District of Maryland, to the seat vacated by Judge Richard D. Bennett, who had announced his intent to assume senior status upon the confirmation of his successor. On April 19, her nomination was sent to the Senate. On May 12, a hearing on her nomination was held before the Senate Judiciary Committee. On June 10, her nomination was reported out of committee by an 11–10 vote, with Senator Lindsey Graham voting "present". On June 23, the United States Senate invoked cloture on her nomination by a 52–48 vote. Her nomination was confirmed later that day by a 52–48 vote. She received her judicial commission on June 25 and was sworn in on July 1, 2021.

==== Notable rulings ====
On August 24, 2023, Boardman denied a request for a preliminary injunction seeking to reinstate a Montgomery County School Board policy that allowed parents to remove their children from lessons involving books featuring LGBTQ characters. Plaintiffs claimed exposure to these books contradicted "their sincerely held religious beliefs about marriage, human sexuality, and gender" and that the lack of an opt-out policy violated their children’s First Amendment right to free exercise of religion. Boardman reasoned that "mere exposure in public school to ideas that contradict religious beliefs does not burden the religious exercise of students or parents". The Fourth Circuit affirmed her decision by a 2–1 vote on May 14, 2024. On June 27, 2025, in a 6-3 decision, the Supreme Court overturned the ruling, holding that the government burdens parents' religious exercise when it requires their children to participate in instruction that violates the families' religious beliefs.

On August 19, 2024, Boardman ruled in favor of environmental groups, including the Sierra Club, which challenged a biological opinion issued by National Marine Fisheries Service in 2020 under the Trump administration. She found the agency violated the Endangered Species Act and the Administrative Procedure Act by underestimating risks and failing to implement adequate mitigation measures for the effects of oil spills in the Gulf of Mexico on protected species, including the Rice's whale. Various oil and gas companies denounced the decision, as they would have to halt all operations in the Gulf of Mexico.

On February 5, 2025, Boardman became the first district judge in the nation to grant a preliminary injunction, blocking President Trump's Executive Order 14160—which aimed to end birthright citizenship in the United States—from taking effect on February 19. The case was brought by five pregnant undocumented women and two immigrant rights organizations. The next day, Judge John C. Coughenour issued a similar preliminary injunction in a case filed by the State of Washington challenging the same executive order.

On October 3, 2025, Boardman sentenced Sophie Roske, the person who admitted to traveling to Justice Brett Kavanaugh's Maryland home in 2022 in an aborted attempt to assassinate him, to 97 months in prison, one month more than defense attorneys proposed. Prosecutors sought a prison sentence of at least 30 years; the sentencing guidelines recommended 324–405 months. The United States Attorney General, Pamela Bondi, said she would appeal what she viewed as a "woefully insufficient" sentence.

Legal offices
Preceded by Richard D. Bennett	Judge of the United States District Court for the District of Maryland; 2021–present	Incumbent
