= Trump v. Hawaii =

2018 U.S. Supreme Court decision on immigration

- Supreme Court of the United States

Argued April 25, 2018 Decided June 26, 2018
- Full case name: Donald J. Trump, President of the United States, et al., Petitioners v. State of Hawaii, et al.
- Docket no.: 17-965
- Citations: 585 U.S. 667 (more) 138 S. Ct. 2392; 201 L. Ed. 2d 775
- Argument: Oral argument
- Opinion announcement: Opinion announcement

Case history
- Prior: Hawaii v. Trump, 878 F.3d 662 (9th Cir. 2017); cert. granted, 138 S. Ct. 923 (2018).

Questions presented
- Are the plaintiffs' claims challenging the president's authority to issue the Proclamation reviewable ("justiciable") in federal court?; Does the president have the statutory authority to issue the Proclamation?; Is the global injunction barring enforcement of parts of the Proclamation impermissibly overbroad? Does the Proclamation violate the Establishment Clause of the Constitution?

Holding
- Presidential Proclamation 9645 did not violate the INA or the Establishment Clause by suspending the entry of aliens from several nations. Substantial deference must be accorded to the Executive in the conduct of foreign affairs and the exclusion of aliens.

Court membership
- Chief Justice John Roberts Associate Justices Anthony Kennedy · Clarence Thomas; Ruth Bader Ginsburg · Stephen Breyer; Samuel Alito · Sonia Sotomayor; Elena Kagan · Neil Gorsuch

Case opinions
- Majority: Roberts, joined by Kennedy, Thomas, Alito, Gorsuch
- Concurrence: Kennedy
- Concurrence: Thomas
- Dissent: Breyer, joined by Kagan
- Dissent: Sotomayor, joined by Ginsburg

Laws applied
- Immigration and Nationality Act of 1952; U.S. Const. amend. I
- This case overturned a previous ruling or rulings
- Korematsu v. United States (1944)

Trump v. Hawaii, 585 U.S. 667 (2018), is a landmark decision of the United States Supreme Court involving Presidential Proclamation 9645 signed by President Donald Trump, which restricted travel into the United States by people from several nations, or by refugees without valid travel documents. Hawaii and several other states and groups challenged the Proclamation and two predecessor executive orders also issued by Trump on statutory and constitutional grounds. Citing a variety of statements by Trump and administration officials, they argued that the proclamation and its predecessor orders were motivated by Islamophobic animus.

A U.S. district court issued a preliminary injunction preventing the ban from coming into effect, finding that plaintiffs were likely to succeed in their argument that the proclamation violated the Establishment Clause of the First Amendment to the United States Constitution and exceeded the president's powers under the Immigration and Nationality Act (INA). The U.S. Court of Appeals for the Ninth Circuit affirmed this injunction, ruling that the proclamation was likely a violation of INA; the court of appeals did not reach the constitutional issue.

On June 26, 2018, the Supreme Court reversed the Court of Appeals in a 5–4 decision, ruling that plaintiffs did not have "likelihood of success on the merits" on either their INA or their Establishment Clause claims. The court vacated the injunction and remanded the case to lower courts for further proceedings. The decision, written by Chief Justice John Roberts, applied rational basis review and emphasized deference to the executive branch. In addressing the travel ban, the Court also repudiated the infamous decision Korematsu v. United States, 323 U.S. 214 (1944), which had justified the president's powers to establish internment camps for Japanese Americans during World War II.

In dissent, Justice Sonia Sotomayor wrote that the decision "redeploys the same dangerous logic underlying Korematsu and merely replaces one gravely wrong decision with another." Responding to her dissent, Roberts wrote: "Korematsu has nothing to do with this case. The forcible relocation of U.S. citizens to concentration camps, solely and explicitly on the basis of race, is objectively unlawful and outside the scope of Presidential authority."

== Background ==
=== Executive Orders 13769 and 13780 ===
As part of his immigration policy, United States President Donald Trump had sought to limit foreigners from certain countries from traveling into the U.S. On January 27, 2017, he signed Executive Order 13769 (EO 13769), which banned entry to citizens of Iran, Iraq, Libya, Somalia, Sudan, Syria, and Yemen for 90 days regardless of their visa status, and suspended the United States Refugee Admissions Program (USRAP) for 120 days. Because the countries affected have large Muslim populations and Trump repeatedly called for banning Muslim immigration during his presidential campaign, EO 13769 was commonly known as the "Muslim ban", and was heavily criticized by many state legislatures and federal lawmakers. Several lawsuits were filed to challenge the order, and in Washington v. Trump, heard in the United States Court of Appeals for the Ninth Circuit, a restraining order was placed on enforcement of EO 13769 on February 3, 2017.

On March 6, 2017, Trump signed Executive Order 13780 (EO 13780), replacing EO 13769 to acknowledge the Ninth Circuit's findings. It did not outright ban travel from citizens of Iran, Libya, Somalia, Sudan, Syria, and Yemen, but required significant additional scrutiny before they would be able to enter the U.S. and banned new visas for these countries for 90 days. It also suspended USRAP for 120 days.

=== Hawaii's challenge to EO 13780 ===
Like EO 13769, EO 13780 was immediately criticized and legally challenged in several cases. Of note was a challenge from the State of Hawaii, which formed the basis of the Supreme Court case. Hawaii brought a civil action challenging the executive order on March 7, asking for declaratory judgment and an injunction halting the order. Hawaii moved for leave to file an Amended Complaint pertaining to Executive Order 13780. Doug Chin, Hawaii's Attorney General, publicly said: "This new executive order is nothing more than Muslim Ban 2.0. Under the pretense of national security, it still targets immigrants and refugees. It leaves the door open for even further restrictions." Hawaii's legal challenge to the revised ban cited top White House advisor Stephen Miller as saying the revised travel ban was meant to achieve the same basic policy outcome as the original.

The Amended Complaint listed eight specific causes of action pertaining to Executive Order 13780:

1. Violation of the First Amendment's Establishment Clause claiming the travel ban targets Muslims
2. Violation of the Fifth Amendment's Equal Protection clause
3. Violation of the Fifth Amendment's Due Process Clause (substantive due process)
4. Violation of the Fifth Amendment's Due Process Clause (procedural due process)
5. Violation of the Immigration and Nationality Act of 1952 8 U.S.C. § 1152(a)(1)(A) and 8 U.S.C. § 1182(f) and 8 U.S.C. § 1185(a)
6. Violations of the Religious Freedom Restoration Act 42 U.S.C. § 2000bb-1(a)
7. Substantive violation of the Administrative Procedure Act through violations of the Constitution, Immigration and Nationality Act, and arbitrary and capricious action 5 U.S.C. § 706(2)(A)–(C).
8. Procedural violation of the Administrative Procedure Act 5 U.S.C. § 706(2)(D), 5 U.S.C. § 551(1), and 5 U.S.C. § 553

On March 15, 2017, Judge Derrick Watson of the United States District Court for the District of Hawaii issued a temporary restraining order preventing sections 2 and 6 of executive order 13780 from going into effect. In his order, Watson ruled that the State of Hawaii showed a strong likelihood of success on their Establishment Clause claim in asserting that Executive Order 13780 was in fact a "Muslim ban". Watson wrote: "When considered alongside the constitutional injuries and harms discussed above, and the questionable evidence supporting the Government's national security motivations, the balance of equities and public interests justify granting the Plaintiffs. Nationwide relief is appropriate in light of the likelihood of success on the Establishment Clause claim." Of the Order's neutrality to religion, he wrote that the government's position that courts may not look behind the exercise of executive discretion and must only review the order's text was rejected as legally incorrect, and that:

The notion that one can demonstrate animus [ill will] toward any group of people only by targeting all of them at once is fundamentally flawed. ... It is a discriminatory purpose that matters, no matter how inefficient the execution. Equally flawed is the notion that the Executive Order cannot be found to have targeted Islam because it applies to all individuals in the six referenced countries. It is undisputed, using the primary source upon which the Government itself relies, that these six countries have overwhelmingly Muslim populations that range from 90.7% to 99.8%.

In drawing its conclusion, the Court quoted the Ninth Circuit appeal ruling on the original Executive Order (13769): "It is well established that evidence of purpose beyond the face of the challenged law may be considered in evaluating Establishment and Equal Protection Clause claims", and quoted previous rulings that "Official action that targets religious conduct for distinctive treatment cannot be shielded by mere compliance with the requirement of facial neutrality" (Church of the Lukumi Babalu Aye v. City of Hialeah); "a facially neutral statute violated the Establishment Clause in light of legislative history demonstrating an intent to apply regulations only to minority religions" (Larson v. Valente); and that "circumstantial evidence of intent, including the historical background of the decision and statements by decisionmakers, may be considered in evaluating whether a governmental action was motivated by a discriminatory purpose" (Village of Arlington Heights v. Metropolitan Housing). The opinion ended with a comment that "the Supreme Court has been even more emphatic: courts may not 'turn a blind eye to the context in which [a] policy arose'" (McCreary County v. ACLU of Kentucky held that a law becomes unconstitutional under the Establishment Clause if its "ostensible or predominant purpose" is to favor or disfavor any religion over any other). The Court also took into account numerous statements by the president and his team, before and after election, that directly said that he sought a legal means to achieve a total ban on Muslims entering the U.S., and a "dearth" of substantive evidence in support of the stated security benefits.

After Watson's ruling, a Department of Justice spokeswoman said the administration would continue to defend the executive order in the courts. Trump denounced the ruling as "an unprecedented judicial overreach" and indicated that the decision would be appealed, if necessary, to the Supreme Court, saying: "We're talking about the safety of our nation, the safety and security of our people. This ruling makes us look weak."

Five opinions were attached to the order denying en banc. Stephen Reinhardt and Marsha Berzon each wrote concurring opinions, while Alex Kozinski, Carlos Bea, and Jay Bybee each filed a dissenting opinion. Judge Kozinski of the Ninth Circuit Court of Appeals filed a late dissent on March 17, 2017, to the Ninth Circuit's opinion in Washington v. Trump, arguing against the State of Washington's Establishment Clause claims on grounds that Trump's words during the campaign were political speech protected by the First Amendment. The Ninth Circuit had declined to address that issue in reaching its ruling on Washington v. Trump and U.S. courts do not typically rule on issues that are not before them, but Kozinski argued it was appropriate for him to address the issue because Judge Watson had cited the Ninth Circuit opinion in reaching its Establishment Clause ruling.

On March 29, Watson extended his order blocking the ban for a longer duration. The DOJ appealed this ruling. On May 15, a panel of the Ninth Circuit heard arguments on whether to uphold the nationwide injunction. Acting Solicitor General of the United States Jeffrey Wall and Hawaii's attorney, Neal Katyal, appeared before Circuit Judges Ronald M. Gould, Michael Daly Hawkins, and Richard Paez for an hour of oral argument in Seattle's William Kenzo Nakamura United States Courthouse.

On June 12, a unanimous panel of the Ninth Circuit partially upheld Watson's injunction. In its anonymous per curiam decision, the court found that Trump's order violated the relevant statute, and so must be enjoined. But the court also found that Watson should have avoided the constitutional question and should not have enjoined the purely internal government vetting review.

On June 19, Watson complied with the Ninth Circuit's decision and revised the injunction such that it would exempt "internal review procedures that do not burden individuals outside of the executive branch of the federal government".

On June 26, in an unsigned per curiam decision, the U.S. Supreme Court stayed the lower court injunctions as applied to those who have no "credible claim of a bona fide relationship with a person or entity in the United States". The Court also granted certiorari and set oral arguments for the fall term. The Court did not clarify what constitutes a bona fide relationship. Justice Clarence Thomas, joined by Justices Samuel Alito and Neil Gorsuch, partially dissented, writing that the lower courts' entire injunctions against the executive order should be stayed.

On June 29, Trump sent out a diplomatic cable to embassies and consulates seeking to define what qualifies as a "bona fide relationship", excluding connections with refugee resettlement agencies, and clarifying that step-siblings and half-siblings are close family while grandparents and nephews are not.

On July 14, Watson found that Trump's limitations on refugee resettlement agencies and family definitions violated the Supreme Court's order, writing "grandparents are the epitome of close family members". On July 19, the Supreme Court left Watson's order on family definitions in place but stayed while on appeal the part of his injunction on refugee resettlement agencies. Justices Thomas, Alito, and Gorsuch said they would have stayed Watson's entire order. The Court also scheduled oral arguments in the case for October 10. After Watson's order allowing refugee resettlements was then affirmed on appeal, the Supreme Court, on September 12, issued a stay blocking the order indefinitely.

=== Presidential Proclamation 9645 ===
On September 24, 2017, Trump signed the new Presidential Proclamation replacing and expanding the March Executive Order. The Supreme Court canceled its hearing and Solicitor General Noel Francisco asked the Court to declare the case moot and vacate the lower courts' judgments. On October 10, the Supreme Court did so with regard to the Fourth Circuit case. Justice Sotomayor dissented, saying the Court should not vacate the judgment below but only dismiss its review as improvidently granted. The Court took no action on the Ninth Circuit case, which addressed Trump's refugee ban that expired on October 24.

The Supreme Court allowed the travel ban to go into full effect on December 4, pending legal challenges. Seven of the nine justices lifted the injunctions imposed by the lower courts, while two justices wanted the order blocked.

On December 22, a three-judge panel of United States Court of Appeals for the Ninth Circuit ruled that Trump's Executive Order "exceeds the scope of his delegated authority" to deem classes of people by their national origin ineligible to enter the country under the Immigration and Nationality Act. In response, the Trump administration petitioned the Supreme Court for writ of certiorari to challenge the Ninth Circuit's findings, which the Court granted on January 22, 2018.

== Supreme Court ==
The Court heard oral argument in Trump v. Hawaii (Docket 17-965) for an hour on April 25, 2018, during which Solicitor General of the United States Noel Francisco represented the federal government and Neal Katyal represented Hawaii. It was the first hearing the Supreme Court had on any version of the travel ban. Observers of the session believed that the five conservative justices sided with the government in enforcing the ban, though the Court as a whole asked whether the ban amounted to religious discrimination and whether it is within presidential power to impose such a ban.

=== Opinion of the Court ===
On June 26, 2018, the Court delivered its opinion ruling in a 5–4 decision split along ideological lines. It upheld the validity of the travel ban as within the president's powers. Justices Breyer and Sotomayor both read versions of their dissents from the bench. The decision lifted the injunction against the travel ban's enforcement and remanded the case to lower courts for review of other arguments the plaintiffs raised.

Delivering the majority opinion, Chief Justice Roberts concluded that the language of section 212(f) of the Immigration and Nationality Act clearly gives the president broad authority to suspend the entry of non-citizens into the country and that Trump's Presidential Proclamation 9645 did not exceed any textual limit on his authority. Under section 212(f), a president may limit alien entry when they find that such entry "would be detrimental to the interests of the United States". Trump determined that alien entries from some countries would be detrimental because those countries do not share adequate information with the U.S. for an informed decision on entry, and that entries from other countries were detrimental because their citizens created national security risks. Trump showed that the limits he put in place were tailored to protect American interests. The only prerequisite set forth in section 212(f) is that the president make a finding that entry would be "detrimental" to U.S. interests. The law did not require the president to give a reasoned explanation that was "sufficient...to enable judicial review." The Supreme Court ruled: "The President has undoubtedly fulfilled that requirement here."

Roberts argued that even though five of the seven nations had a Muslim majority, that fact alone "does not support an inference of religious hostility, given that the policy covers just 8% of the world's Muslim population and is limited to countries that were previously designated by Congress or prior administrations as posing national security risks." Additionally, three Muslim-majority countries had been dropped from the original travel ban upon Trump's inauguration. Similarly, there were waiver exemptions, such as medical, for which people from banned nations were eligible. In conclusion, Roberts said the White House had shown a "sufficient national security justification". The plaintiffs had standing because they had been separated from their families.

The main issue was whether the travel ban violated the Establishment Clause, which prohibits the government from making any law "respecting an establishment of religion, or prohibiting the free exercise thereof". The plaintiffs argued that the travel ban violated the Establishment Clause because the President's statements about Islam cast doubt on the government's asserted national security justification. While religious classifications and burdens on free exercise would ordinarily need to pass the strict scrutiny standard, under Kleindienst v. Mandel, this does not apply to discretionary executive decisions to deny non-citizens admission to the United States. The Court concluded that the travel ban was a "facially neutral policy denying certain foreign nationals the privilege of admission" that could survive rational basis review.

==== Korematsu ====
Part of the majority's decision referenced Korematsu v. United States, 323 U.S. 214 (1944), which upheld the constitutionality of President Franklin D. Roosevelt's Executive Order forcing Japanese-American citizens into concentration camps during World War II. The dissenting opinions in Trump mentioned Korematsu, leading Roberts to write, "[t]he dissent's reference to Korematsu, however, affords this Court the opportunity to make express what is already obvious: Korematsu was gravely wrong the day it was decided, has been overruled in the court of history, and—to be clear—'has no place in law under the Constitution'" (quoting Justice Robert H. Jackson's dissent from Korematsu). Scholars disagreed whether this constituted "an actual overturning of Korematsu or merely disapproving dictum" of it.

=== Concurring opinions ===
Justices Anthony Kennedy and Clarence Thomas filed concurring opinions. Kennedy concurred with the majority in finding that the president has the authority to issue the ban but emphasized the need for the lower courts to review the ban to make sure it itself is constitutional. He also discussed the need for U.S. officials to keep the Constitution in mind when speaking, even if their statements cannot be adjudicated using judicial review. Thomas's concurrence questioned the need and immediacy of a nationwide injunction against the EO, and a district court's ability to issue such an injunction, supporting the decision to reverse the district court's order.

=== Dissenting opinions ===
Justice Breyer wrote a dissenting opinion, joined by Justice Elena Kagan, agreeing with the majority that the case should be remanded to the lower court for further review, but arguing that the injunction on the ban should remain. He took issue with the standards for how waivers and exemptions to the EO are made, noting that previous Executive Orders on immigration had used consistent standards for waivers, such as President Jimmy Carter's Executive Order 12172 banning immigrants from Iran. If the current EO ban was following its waiver system, that would strengthen the government's position that the ban was religiously neutral, but Breyer documented several cases where the waiver process under the EO had seemingly been inconsistent, weakening the government's position. He concluded that

Declarations, anecdotal evidence, facts, and numbers taken from amicus briefs are not judicial fact findings. The Government has not had an opportunity to respond, and a court has not had an opportunity to decide. But, given the importance of the decision in this case, the need for assurance that the Proclamation does not rest upon a 'Muslim ban', and the assistance in deciding the issue that answers to the 'exemption and waiver' questions may provide, I would send this case back to the District Court for further proceedings. And I would leave the injunction in effect while the matter is litigated.
If this Court must decide the question without this further litigation, I would, on balance, find the evidence of antireligious bias...a sufficient reason to set the Proclamation aside.

Justice Sotomayor, joined by Justice Ruth Bader Ginsburg, wrote a more scathing dissent, fully critical of the majority's opinion:

The United States of America is a Nation built upon the promise of religious liberty. Our Founders honored that core promise by embedding the principle of religious neutrality in the First Amendment. The Court's decision today fails to safeguard that fundamental principle. It leaves undisturbed a policy first advertised openly and unequivocally as a "total and complete shutdown of Muslims entering the United States" because the policy now masquerades behind a façade of national-security concerns.

Sotomayor took issue with a perceived double standard by the Court given the decision in Masterpiece Cakeshop v. Colorado Civil Rights Commission, 585 U.S. 617 (2018), which found that government officials had treated a defendant's freedom of religious exercise with hostility, demanding the case be reheard on a more neutral basis. She wrote, "Unlike in Masterpiece, where the majority considered the state commissioners' statements about religion to be persuasive evidence of unconstitutional government action, the majority here completely sets aside the President's charged statements about Muslims as irrelevant".

Sotomayor also saw parallels between this case and Korematsu, acknowledging that decision's legacy and the cautions that the dissenters from it had made about the threat to the Constitution as a result. Although she welcomed that the majority opinion effectively jettisoned Korematsu, she feared the decision of Trump "redeploys the same dangerous logic underlying Korematsu and merely replaces one 'gravely wrong' decision with another".

== Reactions ==
After the decision, various protests were held around the country, including one in front of the Supreme Court building in Washington, D.C., and others in New York City, Seattle, Portland, and Atlanta.

== See also ==
- Political question
- TikTok, Inc. v. Garland
- Travel bans under the Trump administrations
