= Haaland v. Brackeen =

Supreme Court of the United States case

Haaland v. Brackeen Cherokee Nation v. Brackeen Texas v. Haaland Brackeen v. Haaland
- Supreme Court of the United States

Argued November 9, 2022 Decided June 15, 2023
- Full case name: Deb Haaland, Secretary of the Interior, et al. v. Chad Everet Brackeen, et al. Cherokee Nation, et al. v. Chad Everet Brackeen, et al. Texas v. Deb Haaland, Secretary of the Interior, et al. Chad Everet Brackeen, et al. v. Deb Haaland, Secretary of the Interior, et al.
- Docket nos.: 21-376; 21-377; 21-378; 21-380
- Citations: 599 U.S. 255 (more)
- Argument: Oral argument
- Opinion announcement: Opinion announcement

Case history
- Prior: Brackeen et al v. Zinke et al, 388 F. Supp. 3d 514 (N.D. Tex. 2018); Brackeen et al v. Bernhardt et al, 937 F.3d 406 (5th Cir. 2019); Brackeen et al v. Haaland et al, 994 F.3d 249 (5th Cir. 2021) (en banc)

Questions presented
- Whether various provisions of the Indian Child Welfare Act violate the anticommandeering doctrine of the Tenth Amendment, the nondelegation doctrine, Congress's limited authority under the Indian Commerce Clause, or the equal protection component of the Fifth Amendment, and whether the petitioners have standing.

Holding
- 1. The Court declines to disturb the Fifth Circuit’s conclusion that ICWA is consistent with Congress’s Article I authority.; 2. Petitioners’ anticommandeering challenges, which address three categories of ICWA provisions, are rejected.; 3. The Court does not reach the merits of petitioners’ two additional claims—an equal protection challenge to ICWA’s placement preferences and a nondelegation challenge to §1915(c), the provision allowing tribes to alter the placement preferences—because no party before the Court has standing to raise them.

Court membership
- Chief Justice John Roberts Associate Justices Clarence Thomas · Samuel Alito; Sonia Sotomayor · Elena Kagan; Neil Gorsuch · Brett Kavanaugh; Amy Coney Barrett · Ketanji Brown Jackson

Case opinions
- Majority: Barrett, joined by Roberts, Sotomayor, Kagan, Gorsuch, Kavanaugh, Jackson
- Concurrence: Gorsuch, joined by Sotomayor, Jackson (Parts I and III)
- Concurrence: Kavanaugh
- Dissent: Thomas
- Dissent: Alito

Laws applied
- U.S. Const. amends. V, X; Indian Child Welfare Act

Haaland v. Brackeen, 599 U.S. 255 (2023), was a Supreme Court of the United States case brought by the states of Texas, Louisiana, and Indiana, and individual plaintiffs, that sought to declare the Indian Child Welfare Act (ICWA) unconstitutional. In addition to Haaland v. Brackeen (Docket No. 21-376), three additional cases were consolidated to be heard at the same time: Cherokee Nation v. Brackeen (Docket No. 21-377), Texas v. Haaland (Docket No. 21-378), and Brackeen v. Haaland (Docket No. 21-380).

The matter originally came up in a Texas District Court on an adoption petition filed by Chad and Jennifer Brackeen. After their effort was challenged by the Navajo Nation, the Brackeens brought suit in the U.S. District Court in Fort Worth. The Cherokee Nation, Oneida Nation, Quinault Indian Nation, and Morongo Band of Mission Indians intervened in the case. The U.S. District Court declared that the ICWA was unconstitutional and the case was appealed.

The Fifth Circuit Court of Appeals reversed the District Court in a panel opinion. The full court, on rehearing the case en banc, held that parts of the law, that set federal standards for lower and state courts, were constitutional, but that the parts of the law that required state agencies to perform certain acts were unconstitutional as a violation of the Tenth Amendment.

The Supreme Court heard the case on November 9, 2022, and the decision was handed down on June 15, 2023. In a 7–2 ruling, the Supreme Court affirmed the Fifth Circuit's determination that the ICWA is consistent with congressional powers. The appellant claims of state commandeering were rejected, reversing the Fifth Circuit's decision. No determinations were made as to the appellant's Fourteenth Amendment claims, due to lack of standing.

== Background ==
=== Indian Child Welfare Act ===
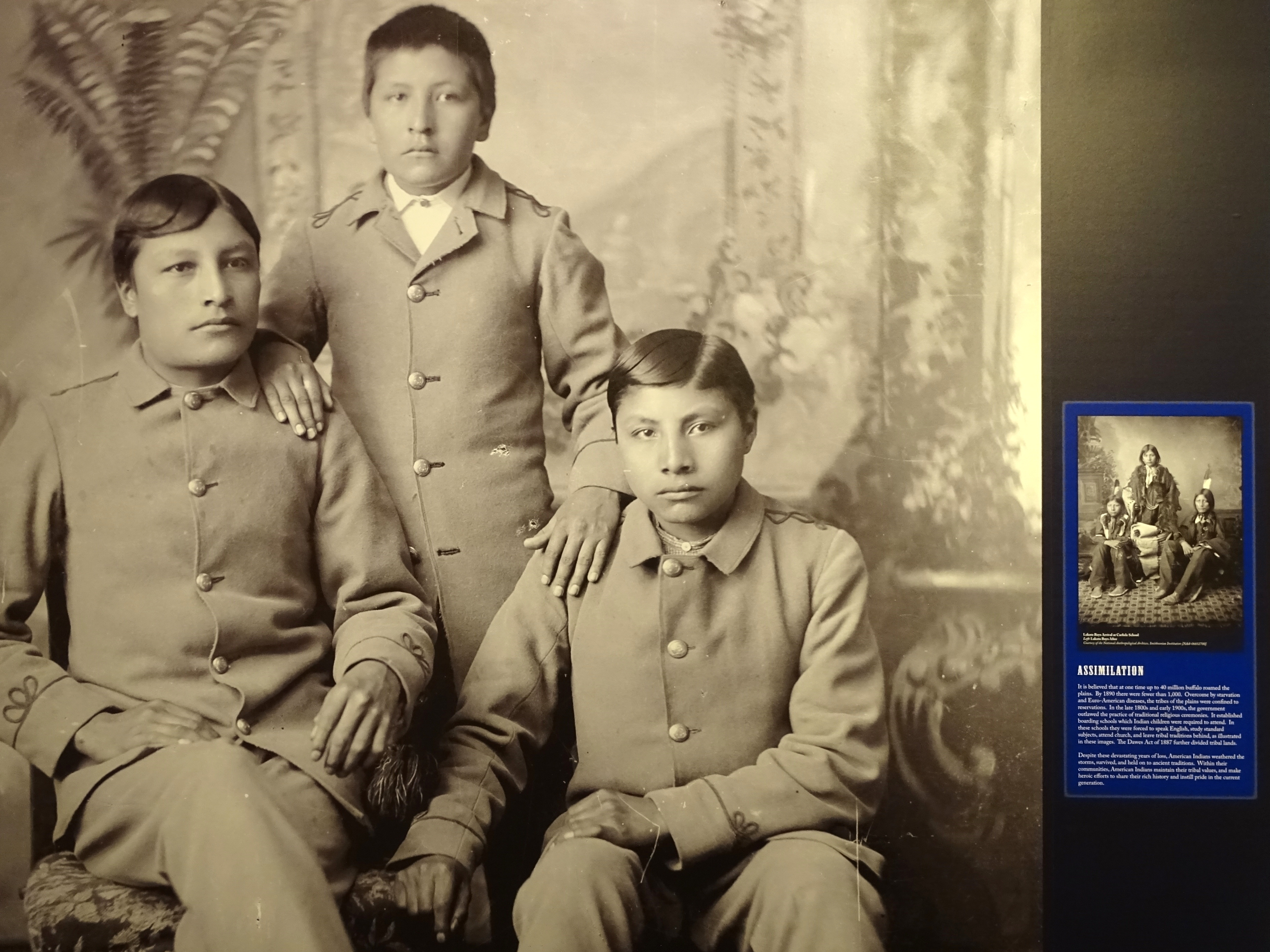
Display on Indian assimilation at the Old Courthouse in St. Louis

In 1978, the Congress enacted a law to protect American Indian children from removal from their tribes to be adopted by non-Indians. Surveys by the Association on American Indian Affairs conducted in 1969 and 1974 indicated that between 25 and 35 percent of Indian children in states with a large Indian American population were being removed from their homes, mainly from intact families, and being placed in non-Indian homes. This was often not in the best interest of the child, but for racial reasons, with "programs that took Native American children from their homes and placed them into boarding schools as part of a targeted process of assimilation."

Congress established the following order of priorities for placing an Indian child who had to be removed from a home. First, the child should be placed with a member of the child's extended family, other members of the child's tribe, or other Indian families. Second, the child could be placed in a foster home approved by the child's tribe, or third, in a foster home approved by the state or other non-Indian authority. Finally, they could be placed in an institution operated or approved by an Indian tribe.

=== Brackeen adoption attempt ===
In June 2016, a 10-month-old Navajo boy was placed with Chad and Jennifer Brackeen, a former civil engineer and an anesthesiologist, respectively, after his Navajo mother (who lived in Texas) was found to be using drugs. The father of the child is Cherokee. In 2017 a Texas state court terminated the parental rights of both the biological parents. (Note: Both the biological parents and the paternal grandmother supported the adoption by the Brackeens, but were opposed by the tribe.) Under the provisions of the ICWA, the Navajo Nation stepped in and sought to place the child with a Navajo family, but that failed and the Brackeens were allowed to adopt the child. The Brackeens later attempted to adopt the boy's sister in state court, but the girl's extended family also sought to take in the girl. The Brackeens then filed suit in federal court to overturn the ICWA on the grounds of racial discrimination.

==== State trial court ====
The adoption petition for the sister by the Brackeens was heard in state District Court by Judge Alex Kim, who stated that ICWA violated the Texas Constitution. In state court, the Brackeens argued that they had a more stable environment and more resources than the child's Navajo relations, and would therefore be better for the child. Following the presentation of evidence, the state's attorney stated that according to state guidelines, the child should be placed with her Navajo family. Judge Kim disagreed and placed the child with the Brackeen family, but allowed limited visitation with her Navajo family. Both sides were unhappy with portions of the decision and appealed, settlement was subsequently reached and the state appeal was dismissed.

=== Libretti adoption ===
In March 2016, a newborn girl was surrendered by her mother and subsequently placed with Nick and Heather Libretti. According to the Nevada law, the mother gave up her parental rights when she surrendered the child. The child's father was found and he expressed a desire to raise her, but, as he was homeless and abusing substances, she was not placed with him. The child's paternal grandmother was a member of the Tigua Pueblo tribe, and the tribe indicated that they intended to intervene if the child was not placed with relatives. Though the Librettis were able to adopt the child, they joined a lawsuit challenging ICWA, stating that the law had violated their constitutional rights.

=== Clifford adoption attempt ===
In 2016, a 5-year-old girl was placed with Jason and Danielle Clifford in Minnesota. When the girl was 3 years old, her parents were arrested for drugs and child neglect, and their parental rights were terminated. The maternal grandmother, who was a member of White Earth Ojibwe Nation, was found to be unfit to raise the child by advocates for the child. The tribe initially stated that the child did not qualify for tribal membership. However, in January 2017, as the Cliffords were preparing to adopt the child, the tribe intervened, saying that they had lacked relevant information when they had found her to be ineligible. The tribe held that the child should be placed with her grandmother. The child was placed with her grandmother, and the Cliffords joined the Brackeen suit.

== U.S. District Court ==
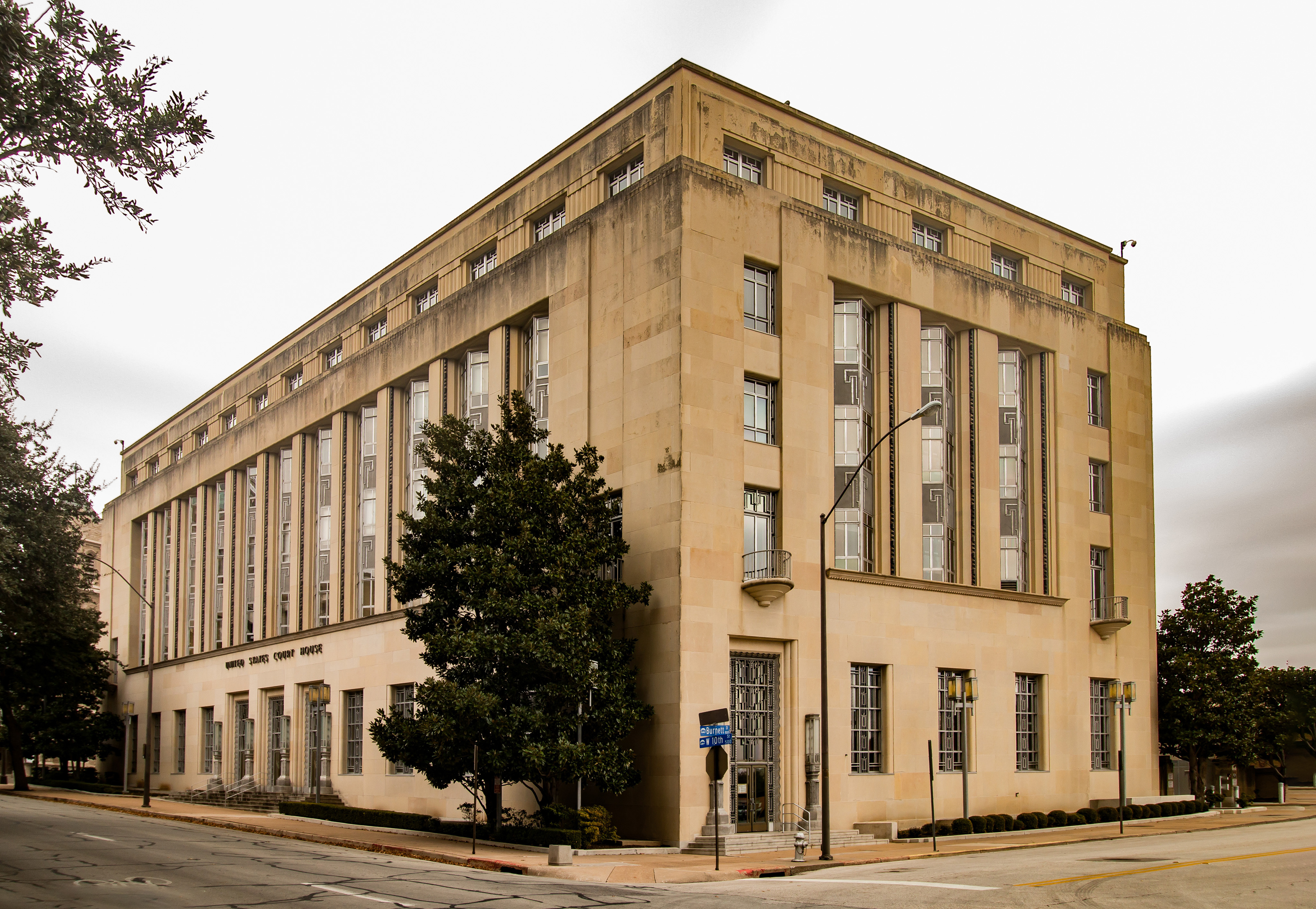
Federal courthouse in Fort Worth

The Brackeens' federal lawsuit was filed in the federal District Court in Fort Worth in October 2017, and assigned to Judge Reed O'Connor. The Cherokee Nation, Oneida Nation, Quinault Indian Nation, and Morongo Band of Mission Indians intervened in the case. Attorney Kathryn Fort was officially admitted pro hac vice on June 20, 2018 along with the Indian Law Clinic took the initiative to intervene in the case. Their co-counsel Kilpatrick Townsend & Stockton LLP also lent their support to the cause. The primary objective behind their intervention was to ensure that the Native voices were heard and represented fairly when the court ultimately decided the case.

=== Plaintiffs ===
The states of Texas, Louisiana, and Indiana were the state plaintiffs, while the non-Indians Brackeens, Librettis, Cliffords, and Ms. Hernandez were individual plaintiffs. The Librettis (Nick and Heather) had sought to adopt a Tigua Pueblo child, with the approval of the child's mother, Altagracia Hernandez. (Note: The mother was not an American Indian, but the father was eligible for membership in the Tigua Pueblo tribe, although he was not a member when the child was born.) The Tigua Pueblo tribe intervened in the Nevada state court proceedings, but agreed not to contest the adoption in late 2018. The Cliffords (Jason and Danielle) had attempted to adopt a child whose grandmother was a member of the White Earth Band of the Ojibwe Tribe in Minnesota. In the Clifford case, the child was placed with the maternal grandmother in accordance with ICWA by the Minnesota court that heard their case.

=== Defendants ===
The federal defendants included the Department of the Interior and Secretary Ryan Zinke, the Bureau of Indian Affairs and Director Bryan C. Rice, and the Department of Health and Human Services and Secretary Alex Azar. (Note: As the Secretary of the Interior and other officials changed, the style of the case changed to reflect the current office holder.)

=== Summary judgment ===
In 2018, Judge O'Connor issued an order finding that:

1) ICWA's mandatory placement preferences violated equal protection; 2) provision of ICWA granting Indian tribes authority to reorder congressionally enacted adoption placement preferences violated non-delegation doctrine; 3) ICWA provision requiring states to apply federal standards to state-created claims commandeered the states in violation of the Tenth Amendment; 4) Bureau of Indian Affairs (BIA) exceeded its statutory authority in promulgating regulations, in violation of the Administrative Procedure Act (APA); 5) BIA regulations were not entitled to Chevron deference; and 6) prospective and adoptive parents whose adoptions were open to collateral attack under ICWA had no fundamental right to care, custody, and control of children in their care.

It was the first time a constitutional challenge to the ICWA had been successful.

== Court of Appeals ==
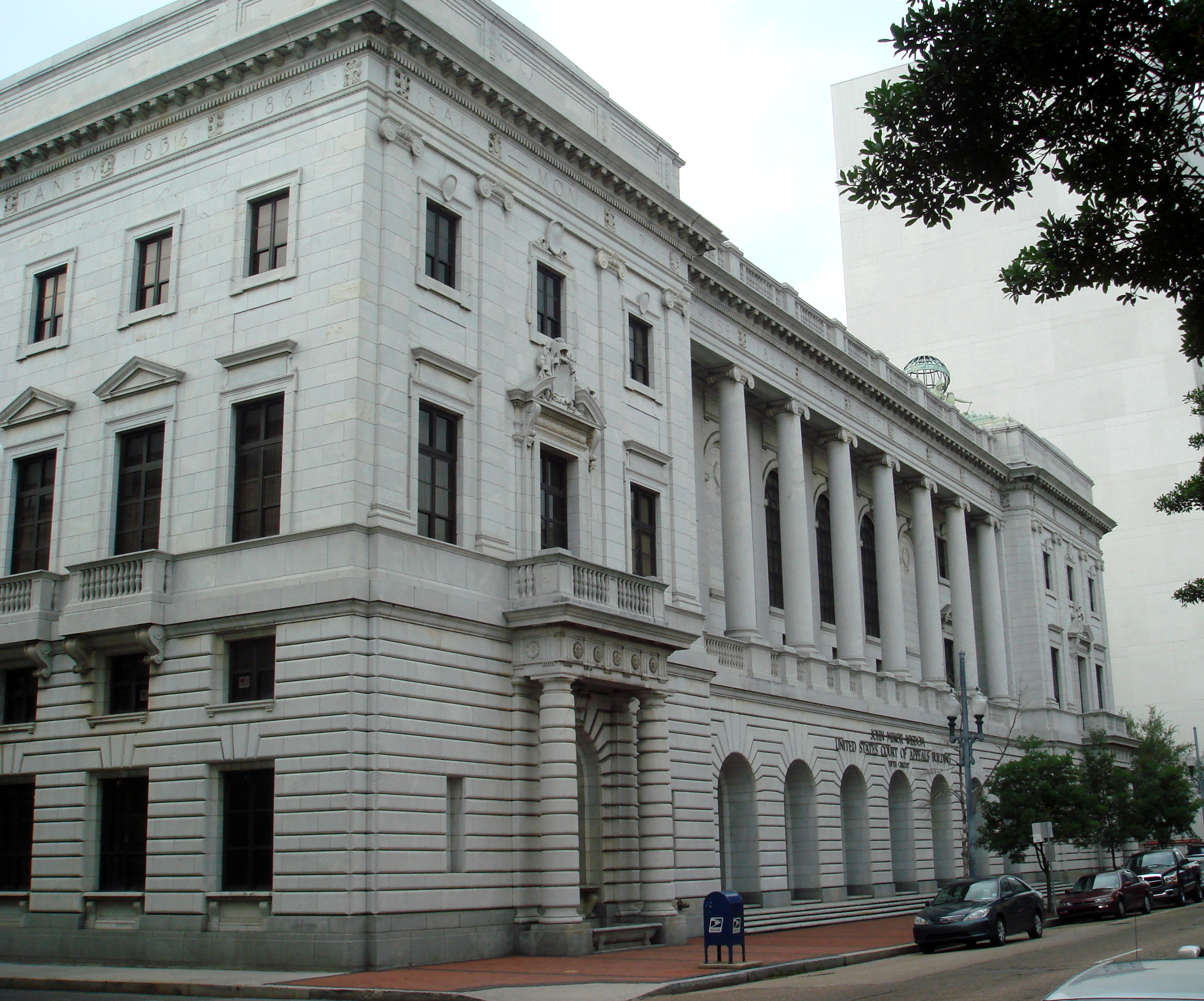
The Fifth Circuit Court of Appeals courthouse in New Orleans

=== Procedural background ===
After the District Court found that the ICWA and the applicable federal regulations "violated equal protection, the Tenth Amendment, and the nondelegation doctrine", all sides appealed the case to the United States Court of Appeals for the Fifth Circuit. The case was assigned to a panel consisting of Senior Judge Jacques L. Wiener Jr., Judge James L. Dennis, and Chief Judge Priscilla Owen and argued on March 13, 2019.

=== Panel opinion ===
Judge Dennis delivered the opinion of the Court on August 9, 2019, which was modified on August 16, 2019. The opinion reversed the decision of the District Court, and rendered judgment for the federal government and the Indian tribes. Dennis ruled that although the Brackeens and other plaintiffs had standing to sue, the District Court erred by considering this to be a race-based law. Instead, it was a law based on political considerations, citing a United States Supreme Court case, United States v. Antelope which had held "that federal legislation with respect to Indian tribes ... is not based upon impermissible racial classifications.

The panel also looked at whether ICWA required that state courts and state officials were "commandeered" to enforce federal law and concluded, two to one, that it had not. This was based on the Supremacy Clause, and the panel concluded that ICWA did not commandeer the agencies, but merely regulated the adoption and placement of Indian children. Chief Judge Owen dissented from this part of the opinion.

=== En banc opinion ===
On November 7, 2019, the Fifth Circuit, at the request of one of the judges, ordered that the case be heard en banc. (Note: Instead of one of the parties requesting rehearing, any member of the court may request that the entire court rehear the appeal, and if a majority of the judges agree, the court will order a rehearing by the entire court. One source indicates that the plaintiffs requested an en banc hearing.) Once ordered, 486 Indian tribes, 59 American Indian organizations, and 26 states filed amicus briefs in support of the constitutionality of the ICWA. On January 22, 2020, the Court heard oral arguments. On April 6, 2021, the court issued a per curiam opinion that summarized the primary opinions of Judge Dennis or Judge Kyle Duncan. The court unanimously ruled that at least one party had standing to bring the suit, and a majority held that Congress had the authority to enact the ICWA.

The per curiam opinion also held that the "Indian child" classification did not violate equal protection. It did however, in a non-precedental holding, determine that the adoptive placement and preference for an "Indian foster home" did violate equal protection. (Note: A "non-precedental" ruling is not binding on future decisions in that circuit. 25 U.S.C. §§ 1915(a)(3), 1915(b)(iii) were affirmed on a court that was evenly divided.) The court held "that ICWA's "active efforts," § 1912(d), expert witness, § 1912(e) and (f), and recordkeeping requirements, § 1915(e), unconstitutionally commandeer state actors", violating the Tenth Amendment, and affirming the District Court. However, it also held "that the following provisions validly preempt contrary state law to the extent they apply to state courts (as opposed to state agencies): the placement preferences, § 1915(a) and (b), and the placement and termination standards, § 1912(e) and (f)", reversing the lower court.

The published opinions by Dennis and Duncan, together with the concurrences and dissents by other judges were over 200 pages.

== Supreme Court ==
=== Petition for writ of certiorari ===
Following the en banc decision of the Fifth Circuit Court, the United States, the State of Texas, the Cherokee Nation, and the Brackeens all petitioned the Supreme Court for a writ of certiorari. On February 28, 2022, the Court granted all four petitions. (Note: The other three cases were styled as Cherokee Nation, et al. v. Chad Everet Brackeen, et al.; The State of Texas v. Deb Haaland, Secretary of the Interior, et al.; and Chad Everet Brackeen, et al. v. Deb Haaland, Secretary of the Interior, et al.) The Supreme Court consolidated the other three cases into Deb Haaland, Secretary of the Interior, et al. v. Chad Everet Brackeen, et al., allotting one hour for oral argument. All four cases dealt with the same basic subject matter, but from the perspective of each individual appellant, and it is a more efficient use of the Court's time to hear them at the same time.

=== Oral argument ===
The case was argued on November 9, 2022. The Court had originally planned on one hour of oral argument, but argument took over three hours.

==== The argument of the adoptive parents ====
The Brackeens and the other two non-Native American couples were represented pro bono by Matthew D. McGill of Gibson Dunn. The first argument presented was that ICWA did away with the "best interest of the child" test used by most states. McGill argued that ICWA violated the equal protection clause by treating Native American children differently, and argued that Congress did not have the authority under the Constitution to regulate Native Americans throughout the United States. McGill argued that the plenary power doctrine in American Indian case law was not based nor authorized under the Indian Commerce Clause of the Constitution. On questioning by Justice Amy Coney Barrett, McGill stated that Congress's "plenary power applies to the tribe's areas of its sovereign interests, tribal lands, treaty powers, its internal affairs, its ability to self-govern." Justice Sonia Sotomayor immediately questioned that position, pointing out a list of laws governing Indians since the late 1700s.

==== The argument of the federal government ====
The United States, represented by Deputy Solicitor General Edwin S. Kneedler argued that the Congress did have the right to regulate the tribes, so long as the law was "rationally related" to the government's obligations to the tribes.

==== The argument of the States ====
The position of the States was presented by Texas Solicitor General Judd E. Stone, II. Stone argued that ICWA violated the Tenth Amendment anti-commandeering provisions.

==== The argument of the tribes ====
Ian H. Gershengorn argued the position of the American Indian tribes to the Court.

=== Decision ===
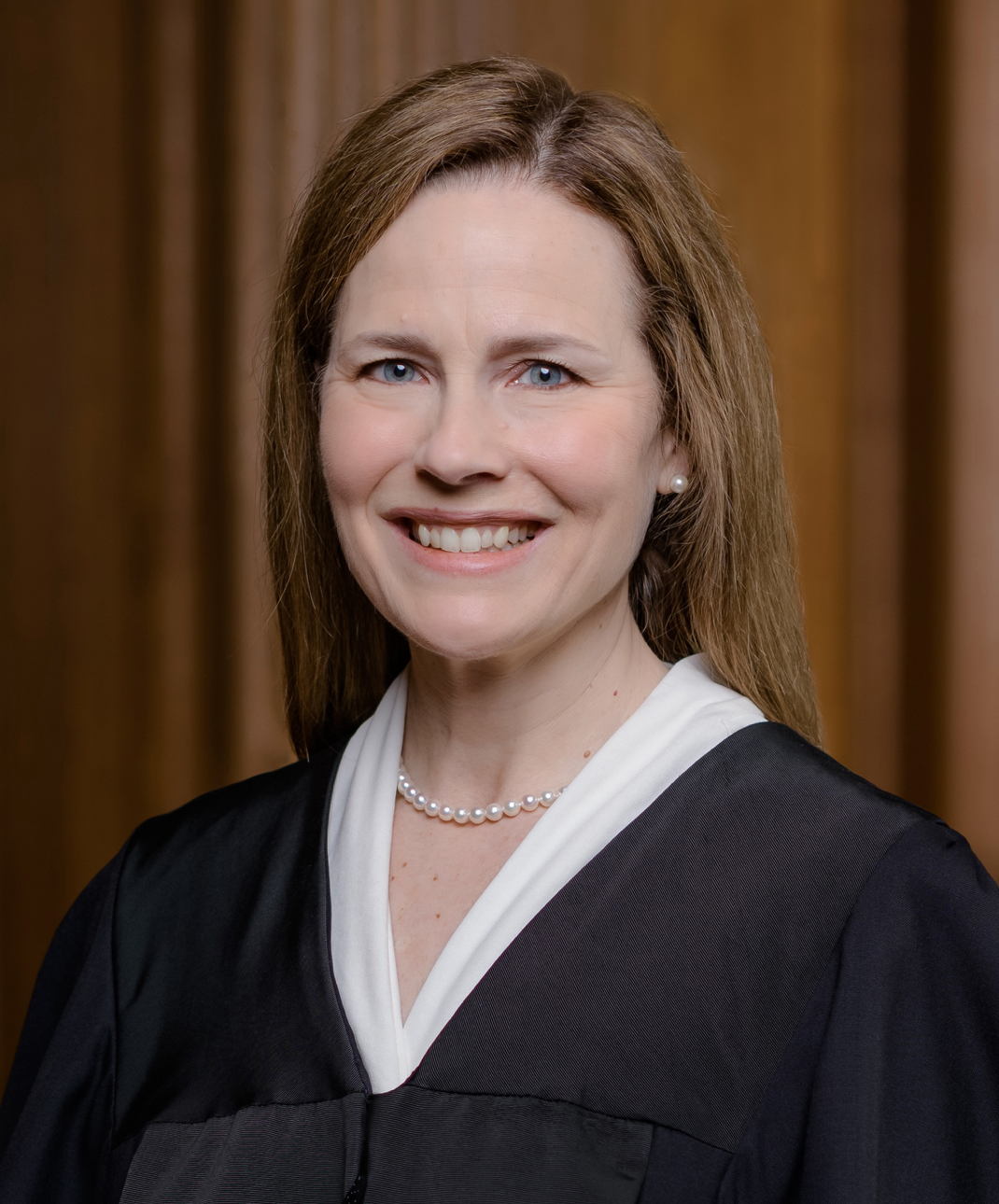
Amy Coney Barrett delivered the opinion of the Court

In a majority opinion written by Justice Barrett and joined by Chief Justice Roberts and Justices Sotomayor, Kagan, Gorsuch, Kavanaugh, and Jackson; the Court upheld the validity of the ICWA. The Slip Opinion, published June 15, 2023, affirmed the judgment of the 5th Circuit Court of Appeals regarding Congress's constitutional authority to enact the ICWA.

==== Concurrences ====
Justice Gorsuch filed a concurring opinion in which Justices Sotomayor and Jackson joined as to parts I and III in order to provide additional historical context for the enactment of the ICWA.

Justice Kavanaugh also filed a brief concurrence to emphasize his concern over the Equal Protection claim raised by the petitioners which was not addressed by the Court for lack of standing given the federal context.

==== Dissent ====
Justice Thomas and Justice Alito filed dissenting opinions.

== Subsequent developments ==
Following the lower court decisions, New Mexico passed a law to codify various provisions of the ICWA into state law.

== Impact ==
There was fear that if the ICWA was overridden by the Supreme Court, that it "completely erase [...] tribal sovereignty" according to Lauren van Schilfgaarde, a tribal sovereignty advocate. (Note: Lauren van Schilfgaarde (Cochiti Pueblo), is the director of the San Manuel Band of Mission Indians Tribal Legal Development Clinic at UCLA Law School.)

== Notable Post-Decision Articles ==
Kathryn Fort commented in a Propublica article published after SCOTUS upheld the Indian Child Welfare Act. Fort was surprised when the Supreme Court's decision was announced, because she had expected them to abrogate some or all of the law as unconstitutional. For native people and their children, the 7-2 vote represented a significant victory. Kathryn Fort has been recognized for her significant contributions and "pivotal role" in this landmark case by The Association of American Law Schools (AALS) and The American Indian Law Section of the Michigan State Bar.
