= Kathryn Fort =

Lawyer, author, and academic

Kathryn E. Fort
- Citizenship: United States of America
- Education: Hollins University; Michigan State University
- Occupations: Attorney; author, professor Associate Director, Indigenous Law and Policy Center
- Employer: Michigan State University
- Known for: ICWA Appellate Project Defending the Indian Child Welfare Act Contributions/Representing Tribes Across the United States in upholding ICWA compliance
- Children: Two sons
- Family: Married to Ronald Ross Fort in 2002
- Awards: 2023-2024 Outstanding Service Award; AALS Litigation Section Practitioner of the Year; 2021 Tecumseh Peacekeeping Award
- Website: MSU Faculty Profile

Kathryn E. Fort is an attorney, author, professor, director the MSU Law Clinic at Michigan State University College of Law, Associate Director of the Indigenous Law and Policy Center, and runs the Indian Law Clinic. She is considered a national expert on ICWA. Fort teaches American Indian Children & the Law, Indian Law Clinic courses I and II. Fort started the Indian Child Welfare Act (ICWA) Appellate Project.

== Education ==
Fort earned a Juris Doctor degree from Michigan State University College of Law in 2005. She graduated Magna Cum Laude and received the Dean King Scholarship as well as the Indian Law Certificate. During Fort's time at the university, she also served as the Vice President of the Native American Law Student Association from 2004 to 2005. Before this, Fort attended Hollins University in Virginia and graduated Magna Cum Laude with a Bachelor of Arts degree in history with Honors in 1999. On December 1, 2016, Fort was given The Outstanding Alumni Award from Adrian High School, in Adrian, Michigan for her work in Native American law. She was in the class of 1995.

== The Indian Child Welfare Act Appellate Project ==
The managing director of the Indian Child Welfare Programs at Casey Family Programs, approached Professor Fort in 2011 to participate in a program that aimed to measure compliance with the Indian Child Welfare Act (ICWA) through court observations. Fort put together a pilot project with her law students to observe child welfare hearings in Ingham and Wayne Counties with the initial stipend. The purpose was to determine if the court proceedings were in compliance with ICWA.

In an article stating Fort had conducted research and gained experience in filing appeals cases, she observed that tribes that had access to a dedicated appellate attorney were more likely to succeed in their appeals. The article explained that most tribes do not have access to such attorneys. Fort proposed the establishment of a legal center for the Indian Child Welfare Act to Casey Family Services, proposing the Clinic could be utilized to develop best practices in ICWA appellate cases. Students could be engaged to draft either amicus or principal briefs in ICWA cases. Fort initiated the Indian Child Welfare Act Appellate Project in 2015, providing pro bono legal services to tribes in Indian child welfare proceedings.

The program offers an opportunity for students to develop their legal research skills and prepare appellate briefs and policy papers for tribal governments and organizations. The faculty provides close supervision to ensure the quality of the work. This work can potentially benefit the tribes and provide students with experience. According to Fort, the training that her students receive in the program is distinct from anything they have encountered in law school before joining the Clinic. Since 2015, the program has taken on increasingly complex ICWA cases often involving state Supreme Court and federal court litigation related to ICWA.

The Indian Child Welfare Appellate Project has four main areas of focus: tracking appellate cases nationwide, providing representation for tribes in ICWA appeals, providing technical assistance and research for tribes in trial and appellate ICWA cases, and providing training for jurists and other legal professionals on ICWA.

In 2020, the American Indian Law Journal published data from fifty states collected by the ICWA Appellate Project, stating that annually, there are an average of 200 appellate cases dealing with the Indian Child Welfare Act.

With all the positive outcomes ICWA has helped accomplish for outcomes in child placement, Native children are still more than twice as likely than other children to be placed in non-Native households. One of the challenges are the limited access to dedicated child welfare in-house attorneys. Fort's work is ongoing, and her student's experience to carry into their own careers. Some of whom are in-house attorneys, many are themselves Native and work with their tribes.

== Defending the Indian Child Welfare Act ==
Fort and the ICWA Appellate Project work on numerous cases involving child placement. ICWA is a federal law that states [qualified] Native children are not to be placed in foster care without the court involving the tribe or tribes to which they belong. ICWA requires they be placed with a family member, which qualifies uncles, aunties, a grandparent, extended family, and kindship network. This keeps the children connected to their culture.

In the American Indian or Alaska Native culture, the concept of family encompasses more than just blood relations. It includes fictive and non-fictive kin, extended family, tribal community and the larger American Indian nation. This signifies that an individual is never isolated and always has the backing of a vast network of family and kinship connections.

In 2018, when two siblings were removed from their home and parents told the court about their Native heritage in order to qualify their two children as Indian (valid terminology specifying a child is American Indian or Alaska Native), however, ICWA was not applied. The judge determined that there was not enough "reason to know" the children were Indian under the law. The children were placed in non-Native foster care without the protections of ICWA to keep them connected to kinship, family, and their culture. The Central Council of Tlingit and Haida Indian Tribes of Alaska intervened 30 days later, and from that point forward the Indian Child Welfare Act was then applied to the case. Fort argued on behalf of the tribes who challenged the case in the Washington State Supreme Court.

This was important for the parties involved. Had the court's decision been upheld, the use of ICWA compliance in the removal and placement of children would have been greatly affected by setting a precedent. The article interviewing Fort wrote, "The burden of checking in with a tribe is low, she says, but the outcome has immense implications for the family, children and tribe." Looking past the issues of law, Ford expressed ""to find no ‘reason to know’ there's an Indian child involved when you're literally looking at Indian people in the courtroom — it makes no sense."

The US Bureau of Indian Affairs published ICWA guidance for courts in 2016, responding to interpretations of "reason to know" suggesting "expansive" interpretation of the law, meaning that this needs to be considered carefully and, [when in doubt], find that there is a "reason to know."

== Haaland v. Brackeen ==
In October 2017, the Brackeen federal lawsuit case was filed in the federal District Court in Fort Worth. The Indian Law Clinic, under the leadership of Kathryn Fort, worked with Kilpatrick Townsend & Stockton LLP represented the intervening tribes. Later, the law firm Jenner & Block also joined as co-counsel. The primary objective behind their intervention was to ensure that the Native voices were heard and represented fairly when the court ultimately decided the case.

Haaland v. Brackeen was noted by many as "the most important" Indian Child Welfare Act case in history or in generation. As director of the Indian Law Clinic, Fort represented tribes who had appealed a federal judge's ruling in Texas that declared the Indian Child Welfare Act (ICWA) unconstitutional in 2018. She had been preparing for several months, expecting that the Supreme Court might significantly alter or completely dismantle the law.

An article in Propublica, a non-profit investigative journalism organization was published just days after SCOTUS upheld the Indian Child Welfare Act in Haaland v. Brackeen by a 7–2 vote. "I was shocked," said Fort. When referring to the people opposing ICWA, Fort commented, "The messaging has really come through that people who are removing Native children from their family and culture, you're not doing good things for Native people." Fort remains outspoken in listing items that would represent significant progress. For native people and their children, Brackeen represented a significant victory.

== Working toward nationwide ICWA compliance ==
According to Fort, there has been no adequate tracking by the federal government to ensure that states adhere to ICWA guidelines. The national database that provides insights into the outcomes of the child welfare system, the Adoption and Foster Care Analysis and Reporting System (AFCARS), does not gather information on whether ICWA covers the children.

The Obama administration's rule aimed to track trends in ICWA-eligible cases' outcomes by modifying the collection method for AFCARS data. This system had a category for tribal citizenship and dozens of other data points. However, in 2020, the Trump administration withdrew those updated guidelines, leading to a lawsuit that argues the decision was unjustified, and Fort's clients have been involved ever since.

There are many articles that write about the challenges faced in today's courts with regards to Native children and ICWA compliance. Madeline Soboleff-Levy, general counsel of the Central Council of Tlingit and Haida Indian Tribes of Alaska was quoted in a PBS new article, saying "A tribe's very existence is dependent on having future citizens," and, "The tribes’ existence as a cultural entity and sovereign government depends on those citizens having connections with their community and having a sense of who they are."

== Notable recognition ==
Fort was recognized for her "significant contributions to Haaland v. Brackeen and her support of tribal courts," and awarded the "2023-2024 Outstanding Service Award" by the National American Indian Court Judges Association.

The Association of American Law Schools (AALS) named Prof. Ford "AALS Litigation Section Practitioner of the Year" for her "pivotal role in the landmark case, Brackeen v. Haaland." During the event, Professor Nicole Godfrey commended Professor Fort's unwavering commitment towards protecting Native children through the Indian Child Welfare Act of 1978 (ICWA). Professor Fort has been defending the ICWA against challenges to its constitutionality in state and federal courts across the country since 2009, when she filed a brief in the Michigan Supreme Court on behalf of the American Indian Law Section of the State Bar of Michigan.

September 8, 2021, Fort received the 2021 Tecumseh Peacekeeping Award from the American Indian Law Section of the Michigan State Bar

=== Media commentary ===
Fort has commented on an assortment of cases in the media as an expert in ICWA, and her knowledge of Indian law and experiences with her appellate project. NBC News wrote "Tribal courts can hear custody cases involving their citizens — even if there are existing orders in place from another court, the U.S. Court of Appeals for the 8th Circuit ruled." This appeal was won after kidnapping conviction, when a mother - a member of Cheyenne River Sioux, took her children to the South Dakota reservation, breaching a joint custody order. Fort's commented, "In this case, the tribal court decided it was necessary to claim jurisdiction over the case, but the laws of the Cheyenne River Sioux Tribe and the states of North Dakota and South Dakota factored into how it ended up in federal appellate court," and added "I don't think the sky is falling regarding custodial interference."

==== ICWA ====
The SCOTUS case had heard arguments in Halland v. Brackeen, hoping to overturn the Indian Child Welfare Act of 1978. An article reported that "Native children are overrepresented in the foster care system, and critics of the law have said that its preferences are problematic because there are more Native children in foster care than there are Native homes to place them in. But Kate Fort, director of the Indian Law Clinic at Michigan State University, said that courts must consider the child's best interests, which in this case happens to include a child's connection to their tribe, culture and community."

In another report on the above-mentioned case, Fort, who represented the defending tribes said, "tribes have more than 200 years of legal history, including treaties and other major precedent-setting cases, that have outlined and codified this political relationship with the federal government." Another report discussing Matthew McGill's view of "the real injustice of [ICWA]," replacing the test (the individual assessments in regular adoption hearings) with "a hierarchy of preferences". Fort answered, "ICWA doesn't prevent an individualized assessment of the best placement for each child," and adding "I personally don't know a state court judge who would be comfortable being told that they weren't allowed to do an individualized assessment." And, when explaining the process, Fort told NPR that this individualized assessment includes consideration of the child's relationship with her relatives, her language, her religion, and her tribal tradition.

Speaking about ICWA, "In 1978, when the law was enacted, 1 in 4 Native children was in the child welfare system; the overwhelming majority — 99 percent — were living in non-Native homes," said Kathryn Fort.

== Notable legal publications and contributions ==
- The Road to Brackeen: Defending ICWA 2013-2023, 72 AMERICAN U. L. REV. 1673 (2023)
- The Indian Child Welfare Act in the Brackeen Years, 27 JUVENILE & FAMILY COURT J. 9 (2023), with Adrian T. Smith.
- After Brackeen: Funding Tribal Child Protection Systems, 56 FAMILY L. Q. 191 (2023)
- Intimate Choice and Autonomy: Adoptive Couple v. Baby Girl, with Matthew L.M. Fletcher, in Critical Race Judgements: Rewritten U.S. Court Opinions On Race And The Law, Cambridge University Press (2022)
- The Vanishing Indian Returns: The Supreme Court's Use of Narrative and Historical Fictions in Federal Indian Law, 57 ST. LOUIS U. L.J. 297 (2013)
- Michigan State University College of Law's Indian Law Clinic and Fort worked on the California Tribal Families v. Azar lawsuit with Democracy Forward.
- Ford prepared Ian Heath Gershengorn, Solicitor General of the United States, for oral arguments in Halaand v. Brackeen, and worked on the inventory brief with former Ambassador Keith M. Harper, Matthew S. Hellman, Zachary C. Schauf, Loenard R. Powell, Victoria Hall-Palerm, and Keven J. Kennedy
- Kathryn Fort is a contributor to the upcoming edition of the Cohen Handbook of Federal Indian law and work with Kevin Washburn and the next edition of American Indian Child Welfare and the Law: Cases and Materials, Carolina Academic Press (2nd edition).
