= Brian Fletcher (attorney) =

American attorney

Principal Deputy Solicitor General of the United States
- In office October 28, 2021 – January 20, 2025
- President: Joe Biden
- Preceded by: Elizabeth Prelogar
- Succeeded by: Sarah M. Harris

Acting Solicitor General of the United States
- In office August 11, 2021 – October 28, 2021
- President: Joe Biden
- Preceded by: Noel Francisco
- Succeeded by: Elizabeth Prelogar

Personal details
- Education: Yale University (BA); Harvard University (JD)
- Brian Fletcher's voice Brian Fletcher's opening statements to the Supreme Court in United States v. Zubaydah; Recorded October 6, 2021

Brian Fletcher is an American lawyer who served as the principal deputy solicitor general of the United States. He served as Acting Solicitor General from August 11, 2021, until Elizabeth Prelogar's confirmation on October 21, 2021.

== Early life and education ==
Fletcher graduated from Valley High School in West Des Moines, Iowa, where he was the runner-up of the 1997 Tournament of Champions in Lincoln–Douglas debate and a two-time Iowa state debate champion. He then graduated magna cum laude from Yale University with a degree in Ethics, Politics and Economics. At Yale, Fletcher competed in the American Parliamentary Debate Association, winning the national championship and the awards for the top individual speaker and the top team in 2001. Fletcher next attended Harvard Law School, graduating summa cum laude in 2006. At Harvard, Fletcher won the Fay Diploma as the top student in his class over the course of law school, won the Sears Prize as one of the top two students of both his first and second years, and served as president of the Harvard Law Review.

== Career ==
Fletcher began his career as a judicial clerk for Judge Merrick Garland of the United States Court of Appeals for the District of Columbia Circuit. He then clerked for Justice Ruth Bader Ginsburg of the Supreme Court of the United States.

From 2011 to 2013, Fletcher served as an associate White House Counsel in the Barack Obama administration. He then practiced appellate litigation at Wilmer Cutler Pickering Hale and Dorr before joining the Office of the Solicitor General. As an assistant Solicitor General, Fletcher argued thirteen cases before the Supreme Court and won the Attorney General's Award for Distinguished Service. After five years at the Office of the Solicitor General, Fletcher joined the faculty of Stanford Law School, co-directing the law school's Supreme Court Litigation Clinic and being an associate professor.

At the beginning of the Joe Biden administration, Fletcher joined the United States Department of Justice as counsel to then-Attorney General Merrick Garland. On August 11, 2021, Fletcher began serving as acting Solicitor General of the United States while Elizabeth Prelogar awaited confirmation. On October 28, 2021, Prelogar became Solicitor General following her confirmation, and Fletcher began working as her Principal Deputy. In January 2025, he was succeeded by Sarah M. Harris.

In September 2025, he rejoined the faculty of Stanford Law School as the Edwin A. Heafey, Jr. Visiting Professor of Law.

== See also ==
- List of law clerks for the sixth seat of the Supreme Court of the United States
