= Brackeen =

Brackeen is a surname. Notable people with the surname include:

- Charles Brackeen (1940–2021), American jazz saxophonist
- Joanne Brackeen (born 1938), American jazz pianist and music educator

== See also ==
- Haaland v. Brackeen, lawsuit
