= Donald B. Verrilli Jr. =

United States Solicitor General from 2011 to 2016

Don Verrilli
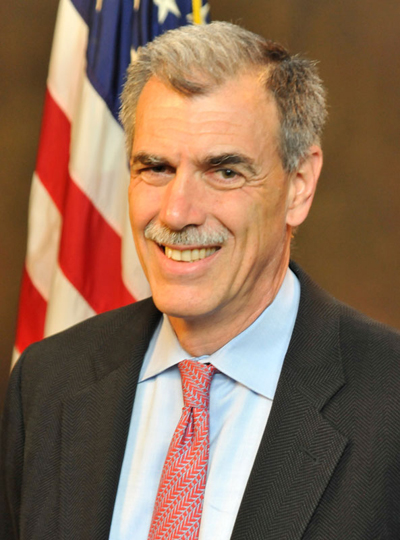

46th Solicitor General of the United States
- In office June 9, 2011 – June 25, 2016
- President: Barack Obama
- Deputy: Neal Katyal; Sri Srinivasan; Ian Gershengorn
- Preceded by: Neal Katyal (Acting)
- Succeeded by: Ian Heath Gershengorn (Acting)

Personal details
- Born: Donald Beaton Verrilli Jr. June 29, 1957 (age 69) New Rochelle, New York, U.S.
- Party: Democratic
- Education: Yale University (BA); Columbia University (JD)

Donald Beaton Verrilli Jr. (born June 29, 1957) is an American lawyer who served as the solicitor general of the United States from 2011 to 2016. President Barack Obama nominated Verrilli to the post on January 26, 2011. On June 6, the United States Senate confirmed Verrilli in a 72–16 vote, and he was sworn in on June 9. Verrilli previously served in the Obama administration as the associate deputy attorney general and as Deputy Counsel to the President.

He is currently a partner in the Washington, D.C. office of Munger, Tolles & Olson and a lecturer at Columbia Law School, his alma mater.

== Early life and education ==
Verrilli was born in New Rochelle, New York, in 1957 to Donald and Rose Marie Verrilli. He graduated from Wilton High School in Wilton, Connecticut, in 1975.

Verrilli graduated cum laude from Yale University in 1979 with a Bachelor of Arts in history and graduated with honors from Columbia Law School in 1983 with a Juris Doctor, where he was editor-in-chief of the Columbia Law Review, a James Kent Scholar, and a Harlan Fiske Stone Scholar.

== Career ==
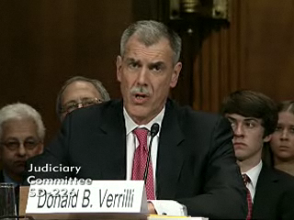
Donald Verrilli at his Senate Judiciary Committee Confirmation Hearing March 30, 2011.

After graduating from law school, Verrilli served as law clerk to Judge J. Skelly Wright of the U.S. Court of Appeals for the District of Columbia Circuit from 1983 to 1984 and then for Associate Justice William J. Brennan Jr. of the U.S. Supreme Court from 1984 to 1985.

Verrilli was a fellow at Columbia University Law School from 1985 to 1986, where he is now a lecturer in law. He then joined Ennis Friedman & Bersoff, in Washington, in 1986. then joined Jenner & Block LLP, in 1988, as an associate, and eventually became a partner. While working at Jenner & Block, Verrilli also was an adjunct professor at American University's Washington College of Law (spring 1995) and Georgetown University Law Center (from 1992 to 2008).

At Jenner & Block, Verrilli specialized in telecommunications, media and First Amendment law. In 2005, he represented the Recording Industry Association of America (RIAA) before the Supreme Court in MGM Studios, Inc. v. Grokster, Ltd.. In 2007, he represented Viacom in Viacom International Inc. v. YouTube, Inc.. During the same year, he also represented RIAA in Capitol v. Thomas and opposed the retrial of the case.

Verrilli was appointed by President Barack Obama to become an associate deputy attorney general at the U.S. Department of Justice and served in this post from February 2009 to January 2010. In February 2010, Verrilli joined the Office of White House Counsel as a senior and deputy counsel to the president.

By 2012, Verrilli had participated in more than 100 cases before the Supreme Court, and given oral argument in seventeen of those. In addition to Grokster, these include two pro bono cases that were notable in the area of defendants rights. In Wiggins v. Smith, Verrilli successfully argued that his client had been denied effective assistance of counsel. In Montejo v. Louisiana, he unsuccessfully argued that his client's Sixth Amendment rights had been violated when he was questioned after having counsel appointed for him.

== Work as Solicitor General ==
On January 26, 2011, President Obama nominated Verrilli to succeed Elena Kagan as Solicitor General of the United States. On May 12, 2011, the United States Senate Committee on the Judiciary voted 17–1 to forward Verrilli's nomination to the full Senate.

On May 26, 2011, Senate Democrats filed for cloture on Verrilli's nomination. A cloture vote was withdrawn right before it was scheduled. Instead, the Senate on June 6 proceeded straight to an up-or-down vote on Verrilli's nomination. Senators then confirmed Verrilli in a 72–16 vote. Verrilli was sworn in on June 9, 2011, and became the 46th Solicitor General.

On March 26, 27 and 28, 2012, Verrilli argued the Patient Protection and Affordable Care Act before the Supreme Court. His performance on the 27th, the first involving substantive arguments regarding the constitutionality of the PPACA, was widely panned as a "disaster" for the Obama administration. However, he was vindicated on June 28, 2012, when the court ruled that the individual mandate and most of the Act was constitutional, albeit as a tax and not as an exercise of Congress's power under the Commerce Clause. His oral arguments were praised by some who remarked that "court arguments are not television anchor tryouts; they’re about the merits of an argument, and a review of the transcript of the oral arguments from that day (with the benefit of hindsight, of course) finds Verrilli made a strong case for the government’s taxing power." CNN legal commentator Jeffrey Toobin, one of Verrilli's strongest critics, apologized on-air and said "This is a day for Don Verrilli to take an enormous amount of credit, and for me to eat a bit of crow, because he won, and everyone should know that that argument was a winning argument, whatever you thought of it."

After hearing his arguments in Shelby County v. Holder, Lincoln Caplan of The New York Times called Verrilli a "lawyer's lawyer" and said that he "isn't showy, but he is a deeply experienced and capable advocate who finds ways to make technical legal arguments that persuade a majority of justices. While he's not inspiring, he's often effective."

In early June 2016, Verrilli announced that he would step down as solicitor general; Verrilli is the seventh longest serving solicitor general in U.S. history. He finished his position in June 2016; his final day on the job was Friday, June 25.

== Personal life ==
In 1988, Verrilli married Gail W. Laster, who is director of the Office of Consumer Protection at the National Credit Union Administration (NCUA). They have one daughter.

== See also ==
- List of law clerks for the third seat of the Supreme Court of the United States

Legal offices
Preceded by Neal Katyal; Acting	Solicitor General of the United States; 2011–2016	Succeeded by Ian Gershengorn; Acting
