= Solicitor General of Missouri =

Legal officer for US state of Missouri

- Incumbent; Louis J. Capozzi III since July 2025
- Office of the Solicitor General
- Reports to: Missouri Attorney General
- First holder: James R. Layton

The solicitor general of Missouri is the top appellate lawyer for the State of Missouri. It is an appointed position in the Office of the Missouri Attorney General, with supervision over all of the office's major appellate cases and amicus briefs. The majority of the matters that the solicitor general handles are argued in the United States Supreme Court and the Missouri Supreme Court, although the solicitor general is also responsible for Missouri's filings in the United States Court of Appeals for the Eighth Circuit and the Missouri Court of Appeals.

== List of Solicitors General ==
Years	Missouri Solicitor General	Missouri Attorney General
1995–2017	James R. Layton	Jay Nixon; Chris Koster
2017–2023	D. John Sauer	Josh Hawley; Eric Schmitt
2023–2025	Josh Divine	Andrew Bailey
2025–present	Louis J. Capozzi III	Andrew Bailey; Catherine Hanaway
