= Rodney W. Sippel =

American judge (born 1956)

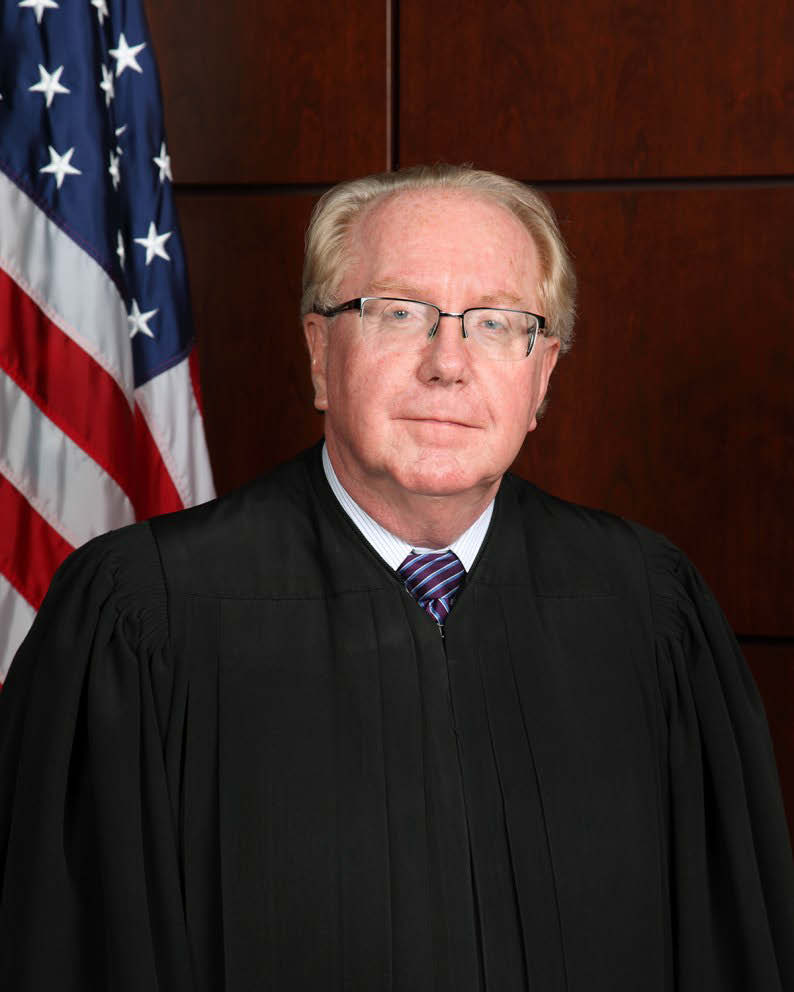

Senior Judge of the United States District Court for the Eastern District of Missouri Senior Judge of the United States District Court for the Western District of Missouri
- Incumbent
- Assumed office January 28, 2023

Chief Judge of the United States District Court for the Eastern District of Missouri
- In office January 4, 2016 – December 16, 2022
- Preceded by: Catherine D. Perry
- Succeeded by: Stephen R. Clark

Judge of the United States District Court for the Eastern District of Missouri Judge of the United States District Court for the Western District of Missouri
- In office November 12, 1997 – January 28, 2023
- Appointed by: Bill Clinton
- Preceded by: Stephen N. Limbaugh Sr.
- Succeeded by: Josh Divine

Personal details
- Born: 1956 (age 69–70) Jefferson City, Missouri, U.S.
- Education: University of Tulsa (BS); Washington University in St. Louis (JD)

Rodney William Sippel (born 1956) is a senior United States district judge of the United States District Court for the Eastern District of Missouri and of the United States District Court for the Western District of Missouri.

== Education and career ==
Sippel was born in Jefferson City, Missouri. He received a Bachelor of Science degree from University of Tulsa in 1978, and a Juris Doctor from Washington University School of Law in 1981. He lived in St. Louis, Missouri and practiced law there, except for a period when he was an administrative assistant to Representative Richard A. Gephardt from 1993 to 1995.

=== Federal judicial service ===
On May 15, 1997, Sippel was nominated by President Bill Clinton to serve as a United States district judge of the United States district court for both the Eastern and Western District of Missouri, to a seat vacated by Judge Stephen N. Limbaugh Sr. He was confirmed by the United States Senate on November 8, 1997, and received his commission on November 12, 1997. He assumed senior status on January 28, 2023. He served as chief judge of the United States District Court for the Eastern District of Missouri from January 4, 2016, to December 16, 2022. In spite of his joint appointment, Sippel maintains chambers and hears cases only in the Eastern District of Missouri.

== Sources ==
Legal offices
Preceded by Stephen N. Limbaugh Sr.	Judge of the United States District Court for the Eastern District of Missouri; Judge of the United States District Court for the Western District of Missouri; 1997–2023	Succeeded by Josh Divine
Preceded by Catherine D. Perry	Chief Judge of the United States District Court for the Eastern District of Missouri; 2016–2022	Succeeded by Stephen R. Clark
