= Holmes Conrad =

American lawyer (1840–1915)

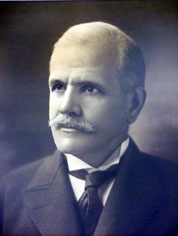

9th United States Solicitor General
- In office February 6, 1895 – July 1, 1897
- President: Grover Cleveland
- Preceded by: Lawrence Maxwell Jr.
- Succeeded by: John K. Richards

5th United States Assistant Attorney General
- In office 1893–1895
- President: Grover Cleveland
- Preceded by: William Arden Maury
- Succeeded by: Joshua Eric Dodge

Member of the Virginia House of Delegates from Frederick and Winchester
- In office 1881–1882
- Preceded by: Edmund P. Dandridge
- Succeeded by: Robert T. Barton

Personal details
- Born: January 31, 1840 Winchester, Virginia, U.S.
- Died: September 4, 1915 (aged 75) Winchester, Virginia, U.S.
- Resting place: Mount Hebron Cemetery
- Party: Democratic
- Spouses: Mary Magruder; Georgia Bryan Forman
- Children: 7
- Education: Virginia Military Institute; University of Virginia

Military service
- Allegiance: Confederate States
- Branch/service: Confederate States Army
- Rank: Major
- Battles/wars: American Civil War

Holmes Conrad (January 31, 1840 – September 4, 1915) was an American politician, lawyer and military officer.

== Early life ==
Conrad was born in Winchester, Virginia. He was the son of Robert Young Conrad, a prominent lawyer of Winchester, and state attorney general from 1857 to 1862; his mother was Elizabeth Whiting, daughter of Burr Powell. After attending the Virginia Military Institute, Conrad proceeded in 1858 to the University of Virginia.

At the outbreak of the Civil War he enlisted as a private in Company A, 1st Virginia Cavalry and saw active service throughout the war. He was commissioned a lieutenant and was appointed adjutant in August 1862. In 1864 he became major and assistant inspector general of Thomas Rosser’s cavalry division, serving there until the end of the war.

== Career ==
In 1865 Conrad commenced the study of law in his father’s office in Winchester, and on his admission to the Virginia bar in January 1866, joined his father’s practice. He served in the Virginia House of Delegates, representing Winchester and Frederick County from 1881 to 1882. Over the next few years, he became one of the leaders of the Virginia bar and acquired an influential position in the councils of the Democratic Party. In 1890, Conrad was a charter member of The Virginia Bar Association. In 1893 President Grover Cleveland appointed him Assistant Attorney General of the U.S., and in 1895 he became Solicitor General.

When he left the position of Solicitor General in 1897, Conrad was retained by President William McKinley on behalf of the Federal government in Morris v. U.S. In October 1901 he joined the law faculty of Georgetown University as lecturer on the history of English law. In 1904 Conrad was again retained on behalf of the Federal government as a special prosecutor in the Postal Fraud Cases. During the last 20 years of his life he was constantly engaged in appeals before the Supreme Court of the United States, including United States v. Wong Kim Ark.

He achieved his greatest success in the last case he was engaged on, Commonwealth of Virginia v. State of West Virginia, involving the amount of the contributive share that the latter state should pay toward the public debt of the former. Appearing as counsel for Virginia, Conrad’s argument upon demurrer in the Supreme Court (206 U.S. 290) was in professional circles considered remarkable. Judgment was ultimately given against West Virginia for $12,393,929. For this complicated litigation he was specially retained by the bond-holding creditors.

Conrad was of striking appearance, tall of stature with an erect military bearing. Though wielding great political influence in his state, he did not care for public office. By nature somewhat of an aristocrat and reserved in manner, he was never what some might call a "good mixer". Although that may be, serving as his comrade, Maj. Foxhall Daingerfield's, best man as Daingerfield's Nov., 1864 wedding, when Daingerfield said the part of the Episcopal service, to Nettie Gray, his bride, "I do thee with all my worldly good endow," Conrad blurted out, "There goes DiVernon!", the Major's warhorse. (The Major went back to war, but DiVernon didn't.) As a lawyer he excelled in discussing constitutional questions, and was at his best in appellate work before the Supreme Court. He had an extreme distaste for routine office work. Holmes Conrad was married twice and had seven children. After his death in 1915, he was buried in Mt. Hebron Cemetery in Winchester, Virginia.

Legal offices
Preceded by Lawrence Maxwell Jr.	United States Solicitor General; 1895–1897	Succeeded by John K. Richards
