= Charles H. Aldrich =

American lawyer (1850–1929)

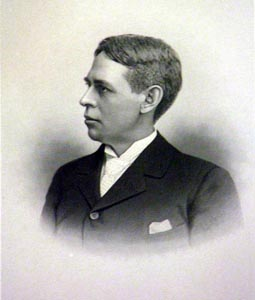
- Charles Aldrich portrait

7th Solicitor General of the United States
- In office March 21, 1892 – May 28, 1893
- President: Benjamin Harrison
- Preceded by: William Howard Taft
- Succeeded by: Lawrence Maxwell

Personal details
- Born: August 28, 1850 LaGrange County, Indiana, U.S.
- Died: April 13, 1929 (aged 78) Chicago, Illinois, U.S.
- Resting place: Jackson Prairie Cemetery, Orland, Indiana
- Political party: Republican
- Spouse: Helen Roberts (m. 1875)
- Children: Charles H. Aldrich, Jr. Helen Aldrich Hare
- Education: University of Michigan (B.A.)

Charles Henry Aldrich (August 28, 1850 – April 13, 1929) was an American politician who served as a Solicitor General of the United States.

He attended the University of Michigan and received his B.A. in 1875. The university also awarded him an honorary masters in 1893. Admitted to the bar in 1876, Aldrich established a practice in Fort Wayne, Indiana, for ten years. He then moved to Chicago, where he maintained his practice from 1886 up until his appointment to U.S. Solicitor General.

In March 1892, Aldrich was appointed Solicitor General in place of William Howard Taft, who had just been appointed judge of the Circuit Court of Appeals for the Sixth Circuit. During his time as Solicitor General, Aldrich notably litigated the debated lives of United States patents, which principally involved telephone and electric light companies. He held the position until May 1893.

Aldrich returned to private practice after his service in the Office of the Solicitor General. Aldrich's achievements also included his leadership in various legal organizations, including president of the Chicago Law Club, member of the Chicago and American Bar Associations, trustee of the Chicago Law Institute, and Vice President of the Union League Club.

== Personal life ==
Aldrich was married to Helen Roberts on October 13, 1875. The couple had two children, Charles H. Aldrich Jr. and Helen Aldrich Hare. He died on April 13, 1929, in Chicago, aged 78, and was interred near his hometown in Orland, Indiana.
