= Lawrence Maxwell Jr. =

American lawyer

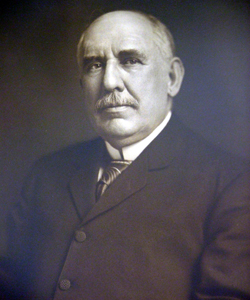

8th Solicitor General of the United States
- In office April 6, 1893 – January 30, 1895
- President: Grover Cleveland
- Preceded by: Charles H. Aldrich
- Succeeded by: Holmes Conrad

Personal details
- Born: May 4, 1853 Glasgow, Scotland, United Kingdom of Great Britain and Ireland
- Died: February 18, 1927 (aged 73) Cincinnati, Ohio, United States
- Resting place: Spring Grove Cemetery
- Party: Democratic
- Spouse: Clara Barry Darrow (m. 1876)
- Children: Majorie Graydon; Mrs. Jean Schmidlapp
- Parents: Lawrence Maxwell (father); Alison Crawford (mother)
- Education: University of Michigan (1874, 1893 and 1904); Cincinnati Law School (1875)

Lawrence Maxwell Jr. (1853–1927) was an American politician and lawyer who served as the 8th Solicitor General of the United States.

== Biography ==
Lawrence Maxwell Jr. was born in Glasgow, Scotland on May 4, 1853. After immigrating to America, Maxwell graduated from the University of Michigan in 1874. In addition, he received an honorary masters and law degree from the university, in 1893 and 1904, respectively. In 1875, Maxwell graduated from Cincinnati Law School and was admitted to the bar. Following his admission, he practiced law in Cincinnati up until March 30, 1893, when he was appointed by President Cleveland to serve as Solicitor General.

After serving as Solicitor General from March 1893 until January 1895, Maxwell worked as a law professor at Cincinnati Law School from 1896-1912. He also aided the University of Michigan as a non-resident lecturer in the law department from 1909 to 1916.

Maxwell's other endeavors included serving as chairman of the bar committee on revision of the equity rules of the Supreme Court in 1911, and chairperson of the American Bar Association's Section of Legal Education and Admission to the Bar, 1904-1905. He served as a member of the general council for the Alumni Association University of Michigan, president of the Cincinnati Alumni Association University of Michigan, president of the Cincinnati Musical Festival Association, and was honored in 1912 by the University of Michigan as commemoration orator at the 75th anniversary of the university's founding.

Lawrence married Clara Barry Darrow on December 27, 1876, with whom he raised two daughters, Mrs. Majorie Graydon and Mrs. Jean Schmidlapp. He made his residence in Cincinnati, where he died on February 18, 1927, aged 73.

Legal offices
Preceded by Charles H. Aldrich	Solicitor General; 1893–1895	Succeeded by Holmes Conrad
