= Jeff Wall (lawyer) =

American lawyer (born 1976)

Acting Solicitor General of the United States
- In office July 3, 2020 – January 20, 2021
- President: Donald Trump
- Preceded by: Noel Francisco
- Succeeded by: Elizabeth Prelogar (acting)
- In office March 10, 2017 – September 19, 2017
- President: Donald Trump
- Preceded by: Noel Francisco (acting)
- Succeeded by: Noel Francisco

Principal Deputy Solicitor General of the United States
- In office March 10, 2017 – January 20, 2021
- President: Donald Trump
- Preceded by: Noel Francisco
- Succeeded by: Elizabeth Prelogar

Personal details
- Born: Jeffrey Bryan Wall; April 25, 1976 (age 50) Roswell, Georgia, U.S.
- Spouse: Porter Wilkinson
- Relatives: J. Harvie Wilkinson III (father-in-law)
- Education: Georgetown University (BA); University of Chicago (JD)
- Wall's voice Wall's opening statement before the U.S. Supreme Court in Frank v. Gaos; Recorded October 31, 2018

Jeffrey Bryan Wall (born April 25, 1976) is an American attorney and former government official who served as the acting Solicitor General of the United States and the Principal Deputy Solicitor General of the United States during the first presidency of Donald Trump. He is now a partner and co-chair of Appellate and Constitutional Law Practice Group at Gibson, Dunn & Crutcher in Washington, D.C.

== Early life and education ==
Wall was born in Roswell, Georgia. He graduated from Georgetown University, where he was a member of the Philodemic Society, in 1998 with a Bachelor of Arts. He later attended the University of Chicago Law School, graduating in 2003 with a J.D. degree.

== Career ==
Wall taught Civics at Orchard Lake St. Mary's Preparatory in Orchard Lake, Michigan, where he also coached Lacrosse.

Wall clerked for Judge J. Harvie Wilkinson III of the Fourth Circuit Court of Appeals during the 2003–2004 term and U.S. Supreme Court Justice Clarence Thomas during the 2004–2005 term and has argued thirty cases before the Supreme Court of the United States.

After his first stint at the US Solicitor General's office, Wall served as co-head of Appellate Litigation Practice at Sullivan & Cromwell LLP. While there, Wall was named a "rising star" by Law360 for his performances in arguing before the Supreme Court, including a case addressing the standard for awarding enhanced damages in patent cases.

Wall returned to the Office of the Solicitor General in March 2017 as the Acting Solicitor General. After Solicitor General Noel Francisco was confirmed in September 2017, Wall served as the Principal Deputy. Wall argued on behalf of the United States in Hawaii v. Trump in front of the United States Court of Appeals for the Ninth Circuit in the William Kenzo Nakamura United States Courthouse in Seattle, Washington. On November 30, 2020, Wall argued the case Trump v. New York addressing President Trump's plan for the census on behalf of the United States government. Upon the resignation of Noel Francisco, Wall was selected to serve as the acting Solicitor General of the United States.

Wall left the Office of the Solicitor General in January 2021 and returned to Sullivan & Cromwell LLP where he was a partner and head of Supreme Court and Appellate Practice. At Sullivan & Cromwell, Wall worked to appeal the prosecution of Donald Trump in New York. In April 2026, Wall moved to Gibson, Dunn & Crutcher.

== See also ==
- List of law clerks for the tenth seat of the Supreme Court of the United States
