= D. John Sauer =

American lawyer (born 1974)

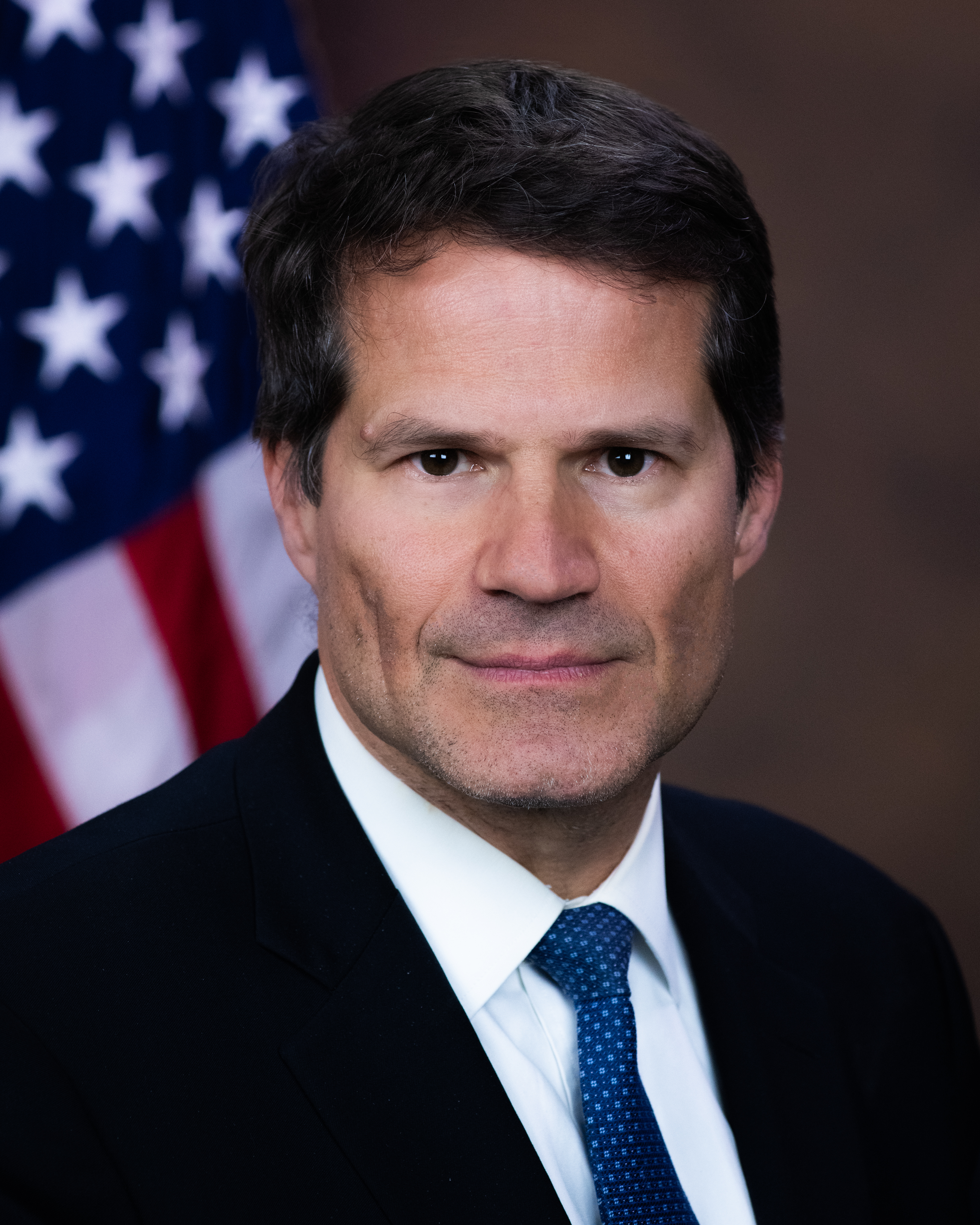
- Official portrait, 2025

49th Solicitor General of the United States
- Incumbent
- Assumed office April 4, 2025
- President: Donald Trump
- Preceded by: Elizabeth Prelogar

Solicitor General of Missouri
- In office January 9, 2017 – January 3, 2023
- Governor: Eric Greitens; Mike Parson
- Preceded by: James Layton
- Succeeded by: Josh Divine

Personal details
- Born: Dean John Sauer; November 13, 1974 (age 52) St. Louis, Missouri, U.S.
- Party: Republican
- Education: Duke University (BA, BS); Oriel College, Oxford (BA); University of Notre Dame (MA); Harvard University (JD)
- Sauer's voice Sauer's opening statement before the Supreme Court in Trump v. CASA; Recorded May 15, 2025

Dean John Sauer (/saʊər/; born November 13, 1974) is an American lawyer who has served as the solicitor general of the United States since 2025. He previously served as solicitor general of Missouri from 2017 to 2023. In 2024, he represented Donald Trump in Trump v. United States.

As solicitor general of the United States, Sauer argued in front of the Supreme Court to limit birthright citizenship, and to include the Department of Government Efficiency as a "presidential advisory body" within the Executive Office of the President.

== Early life and education ==
Sauer was born on November 13, 1974, in St. Louis, Missouri, to a family that was prominent in local business and politics. He attended Saint Louis Priory School, a Catholic day school for boys in Creve Coeur run by the Benedictines of Saint Louis Abbey.

Sauer graduated from Duke University in 1997 with two bachelor's degrees: a Bachelor of Arts in philosophy and a Bachelor of Science in electrical engineering, summa cum laude. He then won a Rhodes Scholarship to study in England at the University of Oxford, where he earned a second Bachelor of Arts in theology from Oriel College, Oxford, in 1999.

In 2000, Sauer earned a Master of Arts in philosophy from the University of Notre Dame. He then attended Harvard Law School, where he was an articles editor of the Harvard Law Review and graduated in 2004 with a Juris Doctor, magna cum laude.

== Legal career ==
After law school, Sauer was a law clerk to Judge J. Michael Luttig of the U.S. Court of Appeals for the Fourth Circuit from 2004 to 2005 and to U.S. Supreme Court justice Antonin Scalia from 2005 to 2006. He was in private practice at the law firm Cooper & Kirk from 2006 to 2008, then became an assistant United States attorney for the Eastern District of Missouri. In the spring semesters between 2011 and 2013, he was an adjunct professor at the Washington University in St. Louis's law school. He later reentered private practice. From 2013 to 2015, he was a partner at Clark & Sauer, LLC. In 2015, Sauer founded James Otis Law Group, which, according to Abbie VanSickle of The New York Times, was named for James Otis Jr., "an early American lawyer who espoused limited government and opposed British measures that allowed law enforcement officials to search private property."

In 2015, Sauer defended a Catholic priest accused of sexually abusing children. Sauer helped the priest sue his accusers and the police officers who were involved. Prosecutors dropped all charges against the priest, whose record had been fully expunged as of June 17, 2015. Sauer prevailed in the civil lawsuits related to the accusations.

=== Missouri solicitor general ===
In January 2017, then-Missouri attorney general Josh Hawley appointed Sauer Solicitor General of Missouri.

On December 10, 2020, as Solicitor General Counsel of Record, Sauer signed the "Motion of States of Missouri, Arkansas, Louisiana, Mississippi, South Carolina, and Utah to Intervene and Proposed Bill of Complaint in Intervention". The motion sought to intervene and join the Texas Bill of Complaint—filed by Texas attorney general Ken Paxton—to prevent the selection of presidential electors based upon the November election results in Pennsylvania, Georgia, Wisconsin, and Michigan.

In January 2023, Missouri attorney general Andrew Bailey appointed Sauer Deputy Attorney General for Special Litigation. Sauer resigned from his post less than a month later, on January 27, 2023.

In July 2023, Sauer testified before the United States House Judiciary Select Subcommittee on the Weaponization of the Federal Government as Louisiana Department of Justice Special Assistant Attorney General.

=== Representing Donald Trump ===
On January 9, 2024, Sauer appeared before a panel of the US Court of Appeals for the District of Columbia Circuit to argue on behalf of former president Donald Trump regarding his presidential immunity dispute. Trump's immunity dispute was a component of United States of America v. Donald J. Trump, the federal criminal case concerning Trump's obstruction of the 2020 US presidential election.

At the hearing, in response to a hypothetical question posed by Judge Florence Y. Pan about whether a president could order SEAL Team Six to assassinate a political rival and be immune from prosecution, Sauer argued that the impeachment clause in Article II § Section 4 of the US Constitution implies that the US Senate must first impeach and convict an accused president before they can be criminally prosecuted, and that acquittal bars prosecution. Sauer further stated that should the court accept the United States' position regarding the (lack) of presidential immunity, it "would authorize, for example, the indictment of President Biden in the Western District of Texas after he leaves office for mismanaging the border allegedly".

=== U.S. solicitor general ===
In November 2024, President-elect of the United States Donald Trump announced that he would nominate Sauer to serve as Solicitor General of the United States. His nomination was confirmed by the US Senate on April 4, 2025, by a vote of 52–45. He took office the same day.

In May 2025, Sauer asked the US Supreme Court to include the Department of Government Efficiency as a "presidential advisory body" within the Executive Office of the President. In the same month, during oral arguments in Trump v. CASA, a case which concerned nationwide injunctions, Sauer stated to the Supreme Court regarding decisions from United States circuit courts that the executive branch "generally respect[s] circuit precedent, but not necessarily in every case".

On April 1, 2026, Sauer presented arguments to the Supreme Court in Trump v. Barbara, arguing that birthright citizenship in the United States does not extend to children born in the United States whose parents are unlawfully present or in the country on temporary visas. Sauer argued that the Court faces a “new world” where "billions" are a plane ride away from obtaining US citizenship for their children. Chief Justice John Roberts responded with: “It’s a new world. It’s the same Constitution."

== See also ==
- List of law clerks for the ninth seat of the Supreme Court of the United States
- List of Rhodes Scholars

Legal offices
Preceded by Sarah M. Harris; Acting	Solicitor General of the United States; 2025–present	Incumbent
