= Sarah M. Harris =

American lawyer and acting solicitor general of the United States

Sarah Harris

Principal Deputy Solicitor General of the United States
- Incumbent
- Assumed office April 4, 2025
- President: Donald Trump
- Preceded by: Brian Fletcher

Solicitor General of the United States
- Acting; January 20, 2025 – April 4, 2025
- President: Donald Trump
- Preceded by: Elizabeth Prelogar
- Succeeded by: D. John Sauer

Personal details
- Education: Princeton University (BA); University of Cambridge (MPhil, PhD); Harvard University (JD)

Sarah M. Harris is an American lawyer who served as the acting solicitor general of the United States in early 2025. She is currently principal deputy solicitor general of the United States.

== Education and career ==
Harris graduated summa cum laude from Princeton University with a Bachelor of Arts in 2003 with membership in Phi Beta Kappa. She then went to England and earned a Master of Philosophy (M.Phil.) from the University of Cambridge in 2004 before earning her Juris Doctor, magna cum laude, from Harvard Law School in 2009. Harris later returned to the University of Cambridge and earned her Ph.D. in 2014.

After graduating from Harvard, Harris became a law clerk for Judge Sandra Lynch of the U.S. Court of Appeals for the First Circuit from 2009 to 2010, then clerked for Judge Laurence Silberman of the U.S. Court of Appeals for the D.C. Circuit. From 2015 to 2016, she was a law clerk for Justice Clarence Thomas at the U.S. Supreme Court.

Harris has been a partner at Williams & Connolly. Before joining Williams & Connolly, she served as a deputy assistant attorney general in the Department of Justice’s Office of Legal Counsel.

While in private practice, she argued before the Supreme Court of the United States in five cases: Salinas v. United States Railroad Retirement Board (2021), Carr v. Saul (2021), Egbert v. Boule (2022), Financial Oversight and Management Board for Puerto Rico v. Centro de Periodismo Investigativo, Inc. (2023), and Bartenwerfer v. Buckley (2023).

On January 16, 2025, then President-elect Donald Trump appointed Harris as acting United States Solicitor General while his nominee for the position, Dean John Sauer, awaited Senate confirmation.

Legal offices
Preceded by Elizabeth Prelogar	Solicitor General of the United States; Acting; 2025	Succeeded by John Sauer
