= Josh Divine =

American judge (born 1990)

Judge of the United States District Court for the Eastern District of Missouri Judge of the United States District Court for the Western District of Missouri
- Incumbent
- Assumed office July 24, 2025
- Appointed by: Donald Trump
- Preceded by: Rodney W. Sippel

Solicitor General of Missouri
- In office January 2023 – July 24, 2025
- Attorney General: Andrew Bailey
- Preceded by: D. John Sauer
- Succeeded by: Louis J. Capozzi III

Personal details
- Born: Joshua Michael Divine; 1990 (age 35–36) Yokota Air Base, Japan
- Education: University of Northern Colorado (BS); Yale University (JD)

Joshua Michael Divine (born 1990) is an American lawyer and jurist who serves as a United States district judge of the United States District Court for the Eastern District of Missouri and of the United States District Court for the Western District of Missouri. From January 2023 to 2025, he was solicitor general of Missouri.

== Education ==
Divine was born in 1990 at Yokota Air Base, near Tokyo, Japan. He received a Bachelor of Science degree in mathematics with highest honors from the University of Northern Colorado in 2012. He was a columnist for the student newspaper The Mirror.

Following graduation from UNCO, Divine worked briefly as a day laborer, LSAT instructor, and paralegal. He then attended Yale Law School, where he was a Forum editor of The Yale Law Journal and a member of the school's Federalist Society chapter. He received a Juris Doctor from Yale in 2016.

== Career ==
Divine served as a law clerk to Judge William H. Pryor Jr. of the United States Court of Appeals for the Eleventh Circuit from 2016 to 2017. He then served as a deputy solicitor general in the Office of the Missouri Attorney General from 2017 to 2019, before working as the deputy counsel to United States Senator Josh Hawley. From 2020 to 2021, Divine served as a law clerk to Justice Clarence Thomas of the Supreme Court of the United States. Divine then worked as Chief Counsel to Senator Hawley, and in December 2022, was named by Missouri Attorney General Andrew Bailey to serve as Solicitor General of Missouri in 2023. In that capacity, he successfully challenged student loan forgiveness efforts by President Joe Biden.

=== Federal judicial service ===
On May 6, 2025, President Donald Trump announced his intent to nominate Divine to serve as a United States district judge of the United States District Court for the Eastern District of Missouri and the United States District Court for the Western District of Missouri. On May 12, 2025, his nomination was sent to the Senate. President Trump nominated Divine to the seat vacated by Judge Rodney W. Sippel, who assumed senior status on January 28, 2023. On June 26, his nomination was favorably reported out of committee by a 12–10 party-line vote. On July 17, the Senate invoked cloture on his nomination by a 52–46 vote. On July 22, his nomination was confirmed by a 51–46 vote. He received his judicial commission on July 24, 2025.

==== Notable cases ====
Divine was one of the first judges to rule in favor of the Trump administration's policy of detaining without bond immigrants facing deportation. As of November 2025, Judge Divine was one of "only eight judges nationwide" to rule that way, with more than 200 ruling the other way. The United States Court of Appeals for the Fifth Circuit, the first federal appellate court to rule on the issue, ruled the same way as Judge Divine.

== Selected publications ==
- Divine, Joshua M. (2015). "Statutory Anachronism as a Constitutional Doctrine". Univ. St. Thomas L.J. 12(1):146–177.
- — (2018). "Booker Disparity and Data-Driven Sentencing". Hastings L.J. 69(3): 771–834.
- — (2020). "Statutory Federalism and Criminal Law". Va. L. Rev. 106(1): 127–198.

== See also ==
- List of law clerks for the tenth seat of the Supreme Court of the United States

Legal offices
Preceded by D. John Sauer	Solicitor General of Missouri; 2023–2025	Succeeded by Louis Capozzi
Preceded by Rodney W. Sippel	Judge of the United States District Court for the Eastern District of Missouri; Judge of the United States District Court for the Western District of Missouri; 2025–present	Incumbent
