= Elizabeth Prelogar =

American lawyer (born 1980)

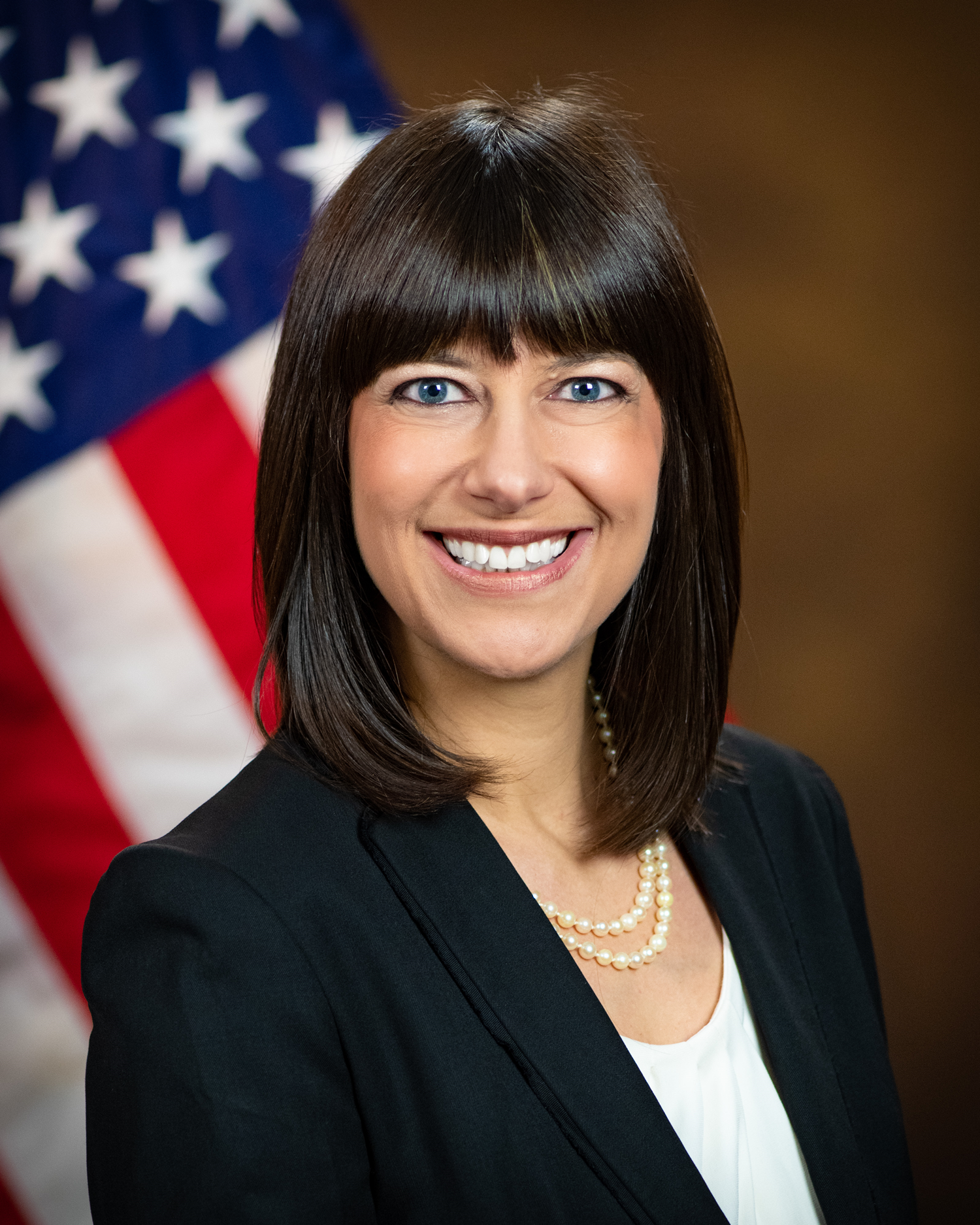
- Official portrait, 2022

48th Solicitor General of the United States
- In office October 28, 2021 – January 20, 2025
- President: Joe Biden
- Deputy: Brian Fletcher
- Preceded by: Brian Fletcher (acting)
- Succeeded by: D. John Sauer
- Acting; January 20, 2021 – August 11, 2021
- President: Joe Biden
- Preceded by: Jeff Wall (acting)
- Succeeded by: Brian Fletcher (acting)

Principal Deputy Solicitor General of the United States
- In office January 20, 2021 – October 28, 2021
- President: Joe Biden
- Preceded by: Jeff Wall
- Succeeded by: Brian Fletcher

Personal details
- Born: Elizabeth Margaret Barchas; March 7, 1980 (age 46) Boise, Idaho, U.S.
- Party: Democratic
- Spouse: Brandon Prelogar (m. 2008)
- Children: 2
- Education: Emory University (BA); University of St Andrews (MLitt); Harvard University (JD)
- Prelogar's voice Prelogar's Supreme Court opening statement in Biden v. Texas; Recorded April 26, 2022.

Elizabeth Barchas Prelogar (born March 7, 1980; née Elizabeth Margaret Barchas) is an American lawyer who served as solicitor general of the United States from 2021 to 2025. Before that, she served as acting solicitor general from January 20, 2021, at the start of the Biden administration, until President Joe Biden sent her nomination to the U.S. Senate on August 11, 2021.

After leaving the office of Solicitor General, Prelogar joined the law firm Cooley LLP as a partner and the leader of its Supreme Court and appellate practice group.

== Early life and education ==
Prelogar was born Elizabeth Margaret Barchas on March 7, 1980, in Boise, Idaho. She was the youngest of four children to Jeanne Barchas (née Bullock) and Rudolf Barchas. She has two older brothers and one older sister. Her father was a lawyer and her mother was a special education teacher.

Prelogar grew up in Boise and graduated from Boise High School in 1998. After first taking college courses at Boise State University at the age of 12, she attended Emory University, where she double majored in English and Russian and was a Fulbright Scholar. She graduated in 2002 with a B.A., summa cum laude. During high school and college, Prelogar also competed successfully in beauty pageants. She won Miss Idaho Teen USA in 1998, Miss Idaho USA in 2001, and Miss Idaho in 2004.

Prelogar studied creative writing at the University of St Andrews from 2002 to 2003 as a Robert T. Jones Scholar, receiving an M.Litt. with distinction. She entered Harvard Law School in 2005, where she became an articles editor for the Harvard Law Review and a finalist in the Ames Moot Court Competition. She was a member of the first Harvard team to win the American Bar Association's National Appellate Advocacy Tournament, the largest and most competitive moot court tournament in the United States. As a fluent speaker of Russian, she also won an Overseas Press Club scholarship to study Russian media and censorship. Prelogar graduated in 2008 with a J.D., magna cum laude.

== Career ==
=== Early legal career ===
After law school, Prelogar was a law clerk to Judge Merrick Garland of the United States Court of Appeals for the District of Columbia Circuit from 2008 to 2009, then to U.S. Supreme Court justice Ruth Bader Ginsburg from 2009 to 2010, and then finally to Supreme Court justice Elena Kagan from 2010 to 2011. She then entered private practice as an associate at Hogan Lovells in Washington, D.C. She taught a course at Harvard Law School on Supreme Court and appellate advocacy. She also performed in a mock trial with Brett Kavanaugh and Ketanji Brown Jackson in 2016 prior to their appointments to the Supreme Court.

From 2014 to 2019, Prelogar was an assistant to the U.S. solicitor general. She was briefly detailed to the Mueller special counsel investigation into Russian interference in the 2016 United States presidential election. In 2020, she joined the Washington, D.C., office of Cooley LLP as a partner. She was named principal deputy solicitor general by President Joe Biden in January 2021 and served as acting solicitor general.

=== Solicitor general ===
On August 10, 2021, President Biden nominated Prelogar to the office of solicitor general. Her nomination was sent to the Senate that same day. Her nomination was referred to the Senate Judiciary Committee, which approved it by a vote of 13–9. She was prevented from serving while the nomination was before the Senate as a result of the terms of the Federal Vacancies Reform Act of 1998.

On October 28, 2021, the Senate confirmed Prelogar as solicitor general by a vote of 53–36, making her the second woman to hold the position after Elena Kagan, who later became a Supreme Court Justice. She was sworn into office later on that day.

=== Post-government career ===
On January 20, 2025, her term ended with the re-election of President Trump. Prelogar then taught a course on "changing paradigms in the Supreme Court" at Harvard Law School in the spring semester.

In the summer of 2025, she left Harvard and returned to Cooley LLP to lead their Supreme Court and appellate practice group. At Cooley, Prelogar represented the Coalition for Prediction Markets, a lobbying group representing several cryptocurrency and prediction market companies. In June 2026, she submitted a brief on behalf of the Coalition for Prediction Markets in the Court of Appeals for the Sixth Circuit case Kalshi v. Orgel arguing that states lack the authority to regulate prediction markets as a form of sports gambling.

== Personal life ==
She married Brandon Prelogar in 2008, and they have two sons together. Prelogar donated to the Barack Obama 2012 presidential campaign and Hillary Clinton 2016 presidential campaign.

== See also ==
- List of law clerks for the fourth seat of the Supreme Court of the United States
- List of law clerks for the sixth seat of the Supreme Court of the United States

Legal offices
Preceded by Jeff Wall; Acting	Solicitor General of the United States; Acting; 2021	Succeeded by Brian Fletcher; Acting
Preceded by Brian Fletcher; Acting	Solicitor General of the United States; 2021–2025	Succeeded by Sarah M. Harris; Acting
