= Executive Order 12172 =

1979 United States executive order

Executive Order 12172 was issued by American president Jimmy Carter on November 26, 1979, shortly after the Iran hostage crisis had started. This Executive Order invoked the Immigration and Nationality Act of 1952 and called for the Secretary of State and the Attorney General to exercise in respect of Iranians holding nonimmigrant visas, the authority conferred upon the President by section 215(a) (1) of the Act of June 27, 1952 (8 USC 1185), to prescribe limitations and exceptions on the rules and regulations governing the entry of aliens into the United States.
