= Noel Francisco =

American lawyer (born 1969)

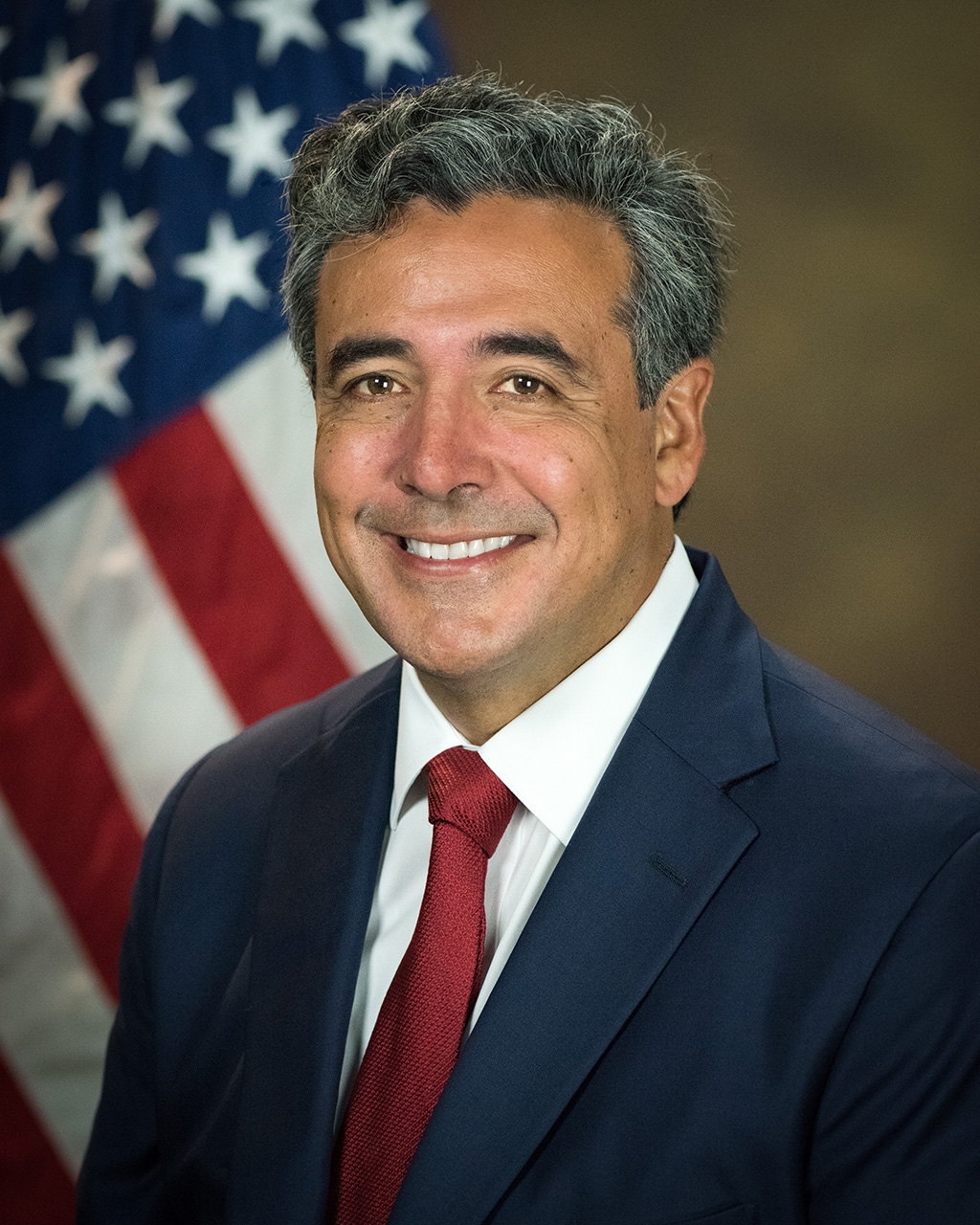
- Official portrait, 2017

47th Solicitor General of the United States
- In office September 19, 2017 – July 3, 2020
- President: Donald Trump
- Deputy: Jeff Wall
- Preceded by: Jeff Wall (acting)
- Succeeded by: Jeff Wall (acting)
- Acting; January 20, 2017 – March 10, 2017
- President: Donald Trump
- Preceded by: Ian Heath Gershengorn (acting)
- Succeeded by: Jeff Wall (acting)

Principal Deputy Solicitor General of the United States
- In office January 20, 2017 – March 10, 2017
- President: Donald Trump
- Preceded by: Ian Heath Gershengorn
- Succeeded by: Jeff Wall

Personal details
- Born: Noel John Francisco; August 21, 1969 (age 57) Syracuse, New York, U.S.
- Party: Republican
- Spouse: Cynthia Stewart
- Children: 2
- Education: University of Chicago (BA, JD)
- Francisco's voice Francisco's opening statements to the Supreme Court in Babb v. Wilkie. Recorded January 15, 2020

Noel John Francisco (born August 21, 1969) is an American lawyer who served as Solicitor General of the United States from 2017 to 2020. He was the first Asian American confirmed by the United States Senate to hold the position. Francisco is now a partner at the law firm Jones Day.

As Solicitor General, Francisco was characterized as a staunch defender of President Donald Trump. In his position, Francisco sought to have the Patient Protection and Affordable Care Act (ACA) and Deferred Action for Childhood Arrivals (DACA) struck down by the courts, neither of which occurred during his tenure. He also defended Executive Order 13769, which was a ban on travelers from predominantly Muslim countries deemed to present security risks; this was ultimately upheld by the Supreme Court in Trump v. Hawaii.

== Early life and education ==
Francisco was born on August 21, 1969, in Syracuse, New York. His father, Nemesio Francisco (1935–1989), was a physician who immigrated to the United States from the Philippines to study medicine. His mother, Therese, was an Italian American nurse from Oswego, New York. Francisco grew up in Oswego and graduated from Oswego High School in 1987.

Francisco attended Brandeis University for one year before transferring to the University of Chicago, graduating in 1991 with a Bachelor of Arts degree in economics with honors. From 1991 to 1993, Francisco was a financial analyst for Morgan Stanley and Gleacher and Company. He then attended the University of Chicago Law School, graduating in 1996 with a J.D. degree with high honors.

== Career ==
After law school, Francisco was a law clerk to Judge J. Michael Luttig of the U.S. Court of Appeals for the Fourth Circuit from 1996 to 1997 and to U.S. Supreme Court justice Antonin Scalia from 1997 to 1998. He then entered private practice at Cooper, Carvin, & Rosenthal (now Cooper & Kirk). He was part of the legal team that worked for George W. Bush on the Florida recount in the 2000 presidential election. In 2001, Francisco was appointed as an Associate Counsel to President Bush in the Office of Counsel to the President. He later moved to the Office of Legal Counsel for the Deputy Assistant Attorney General in the United States Department of Justice, serving in that capacity from 2003 until 2005.

In 2005, Francisco moved back to the private sector, joining the Washington, D.C. office of the law firm Jones Day, eventually becoming the chair of the firm's government regulation practice. While at Jones Day, he appeared several times before the Supreme Court, including in McDonnell v. United States, which involved the meaning of "official act" under federal bribery statutes; Zubik v. Burwell, which involved the application of the Religious Freedom Restoration Act to regulations related to insurance coverage for contraception; and NLRB v. Noel Canning, which involved the Constitution’s recess appointment power. He also argued numerous cases in the lower federal and state courts on a wide range of constitutional, civil, and criminal matters.

=== Trump administration ===
Francisco left Jones Day when he was appointed by President Donald Trump to the position of Principal Deputy Solicitor General for the United States, effective January 23, 2017. He served as the Acting Solicitor General from that date until March 10, 2017. On March 7, 2017, the White House announced Francisco's nomination to the position of Solicitor General. He was confirmed by the U.S. Senate by a vote of 50–47 on September 19, 2017, and was sworn in later that day.

With the resignation of Rachel Brand as Associate Attorney General on February 8, 2018, Francisco became the fourth-ranking official in the Justice Department. Francisco received an ethics waiver on April 24, 2018, which relieved him of a previous obligation to recuse himself from any investigation in which his former employer, law firm Jones Day, was involved. Jones Day, which owed Francisco approximately $500,000, represented the Trump presidential campaign in the Special Counsel investigation.

On June 17, 2020, Francisco announced that he would be leaving his post at the Department of Justice, effective July 3, 2020. In his three years as United States Solicitor General, Francisco had represented the United States government in over 150 merit cases, and personally argued in 17.

As Solicitor General, Francisco was characterized as an "aggressive defender" of Trump. As Solicitor General, Francisco sought to have the Affordable Care Act (Obamacare) and the Deferred Action for Childhood Arrivals (DACA) struck down. He defended Trump's travel ban, which barred people from seven majority-Muslim countries. He sought to prevent Congress from accessing a redacted version of Special Counsel Robert Mueller's report into Russian interference in the 2016 election. He defended the Justice Department's decision to withdraw a case against Trump associate Michael Flynn even after Flynn had pleaded guilty. He fought against a subpoena to turn over Trump's tax records to the Manhattan District Attorney.

== Personal life ==
Francisco is married with two daughters and resides in Washington, D.C. He previously served on the board of directors of the Chicago-based Lumen Christi Institute.

== Selected publications and lectures ==
Articles

- Francisco, Noel; Carvin, Michael A.; Vergonis, Christian G. (2008). "Massive, Unchecked Power by Design: The Unconstitutional Exercise of Executive Authority by the Public Company Accounting Oversight Board". New York University Journal of Law & Business. 4: 199–243.
- —; Burnham, James (2013). "Noel Canning v. NLRB — Enforcing Basic Constitutional Limits on Presidential Power" (PDF). Virginia Law Review. 99 (1): 17–29. Archived from the original (PDF) on 2017-03-12.
- — (2017). "Justice Scalia: Constitutional Conservative". University of Chicago Law Review. 84 (Special): 2169–77. JSTOR 45063668.

Op-eds

- Francisco, Noel J.; Burnham, James M. (October 3, 2016). "Time for a New Pleading Standard in Criminal Cases". Forbes. Retrieved January 29, 2019.

== See also ==
- List of law clerks for the ninth seat of the Supreme Court of the United States
- Mueller special counsel investigation
- Donald Trump Supreme Court candidates

Legal offices
Preceded by Ian Gershengorn; Acting	Solicitor General of the United States; Acting; 2017	Succeeded by Jeff Wall; Acting
Preceded by Jeff Wall; Acting	Solicitor General of the United States; 2017–2020	Succeeded by Jeff Wall; Acting
