= Ian Heath Gershengorn =

American lawyer (born 1967)

Ian Gershengorn
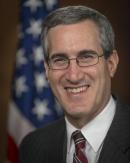

Acting Solicitor General of the United States
- In office June 25, 2016 – January 20, 2017
- President: Barack Obama
- Preceded by: Don Verrilli
- Succeeded by: Noel Francisco (acting)

Principal Deputy Solicitor General of the United States
- In office September 2013 – June 25, 2016
- President: Barack Obama
- Preceded by: Sri Srinivasan
- Succeeded by: Noel Francisco

Personal details
- Born: Ian Heath Gershengorn; February 21, 1967 (age 59) New York City, U.S.
- Spouse: Gail Felice Levine (m. 1996)
- Education: Harvard University (BA, JD)

Ian Heath Gershengorn (born February 21, 1967) is an American lawyer and former acting solicitor general of the United States under President Barack Obama.

== Early life and education ==
Born in New York, New York and raised outside of Boston, Gershengorn attended the Roxbury Latin School. He earned a bachelor's degree, magna cum laude, from Harvard University in 1988 and a J.D. degree, magna cum laude, from Harvard Law School in 1993.

From 1993 until 1994, Gershengorn clerked for United States Court of Appeals for the Second Circuit Judge Amalya Kearse. From 1994 until 1995, Gershengorn worked as a law clerk for United States Supreme Court Associate Justice John Paul Stevens.

== Professional career ==
From 1995 until 1997, Gershengorn worked for the United States Department of Justice as a special assistant and counsel to then-United States Deputy Attorney General Jamie Gorelick.

In 1997, Gershengorn joined the law firm of Jenner & Block, rising to the level of Partner in the firm's litigation department, working in the firm's Appellate and Supreme Court Practice and in its Communications Practice. While at the firm, Gershengorn was very active in representing Indian tribes in Supreme Court and appellate litigation. Gershengorn is listed in a Halland v. Brackeen amicus brief with Kathryn Fort, former Ambassador Keith M. Harper, Matthew S. Hellman, Zachary C. Schauf, Loenard R. Powell, Victoria Hall-Palerm, and Keven J. Kennedy.

On April 13, 2009, it was announced that Gershengorn would be rejoining the United States Department of Justice as a deputy assistant attorney general in the Civil Division with oversight of the Federal Programs Branch. The Federal Programs Branch is handling Guantánamo Bay detainee cases and state secret matters.

In his deputy assistant attorney general position, Gershengorn was known for his work in defending legal challenges to President Obama's signature legislative achievement, the Patient Protection and Affordable Care Act.

On August 9, 2013, Gershengorn was named as the Principal Deputy Solicitor General in the United States Department of Justice's Office of the United States Solicitor General.

On June 2, 2016, it was announced that Donald B. Verrilli Jr. was stepping down as Solicitor General and that Gershengorn would become Acting Solicitor General effective June 25, 2016, which he remained until resigning at the end of Obama's term on January 20, 2017 because the Republican Senate majority did not act on any replacement.

== Personal life ==
On September 1, 1996, he married Gail Felice Levine in Dallas, Texas. Gershengorn's wife has worked as a lawyer for the United States Department of Justice, as have two of his sisters. His father is a cardiologist and his mother, Wendie Gershengorn, was a state court judge in Massachusetts. He and Gail have three sons.

== See also ==
- List of law clerks for the fourth seat of the Supreme Court of the United States

Legal offices
Preceded by Don Verrilli	Solicitor General of the United States; Acting; 2016–2017	Succeeded by Noel Francisco; Acting
