= Solicitor General of the United States =

Position in the United States Department of Justice

- Flag of the United States solicitor general

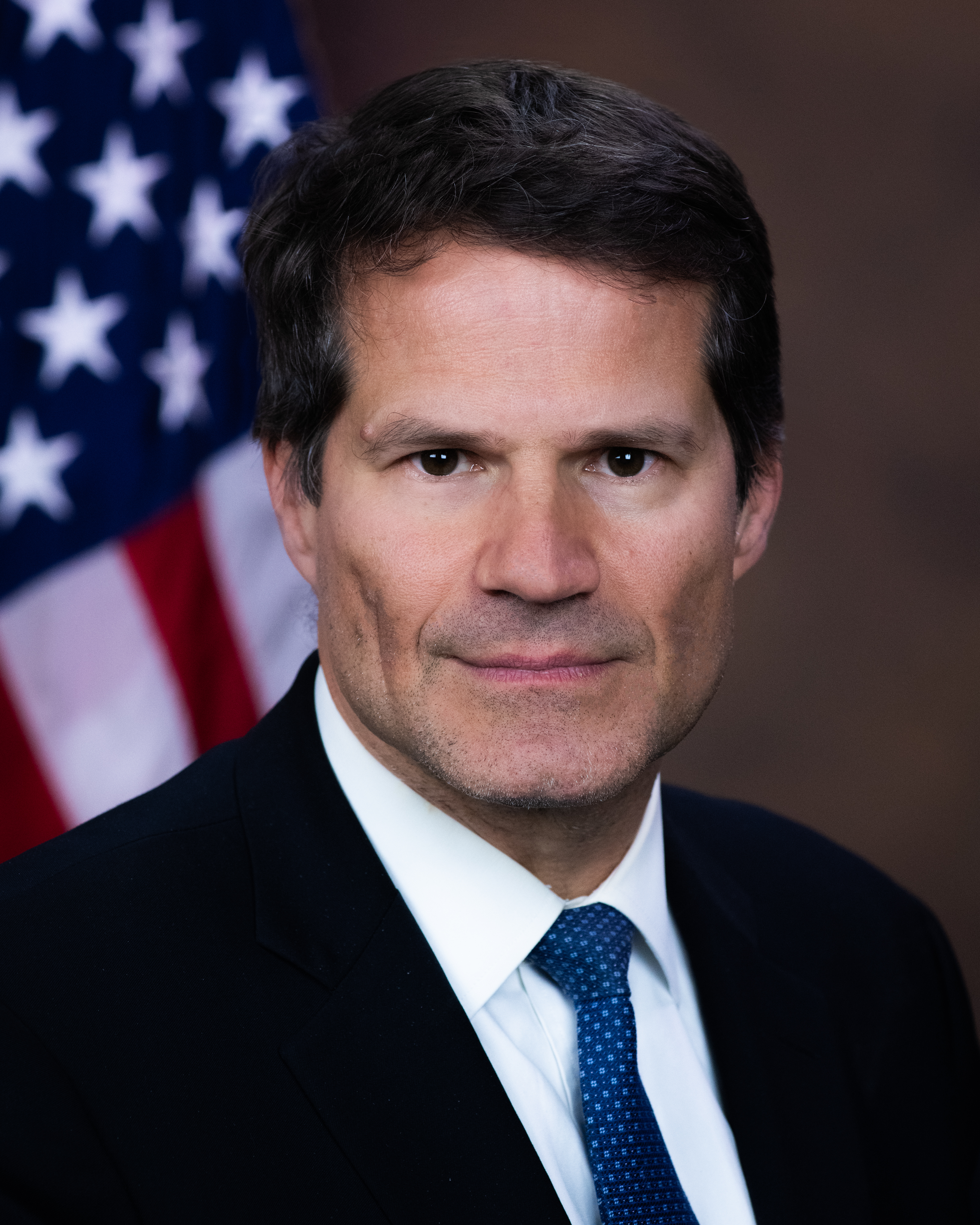
- Incumbent; D. John Sauer since April 4, 2025
- United States Department of Justice
- Style: Mr. or Madam Solicitor General; General (in the Supreme Court)
- Reports to: Attorney General
- Seat: Supreme Court Building and Department of Justice Headquarters
- Appointer: The president; with Senate advice and consent
- Constituting instrument: 28 U.S.C. § 505
- Formation: October 1870
- First holder: Benjamin Bristow
- Deputy: Principal Deputy Solicitor General
- Website: justice.gov/osg

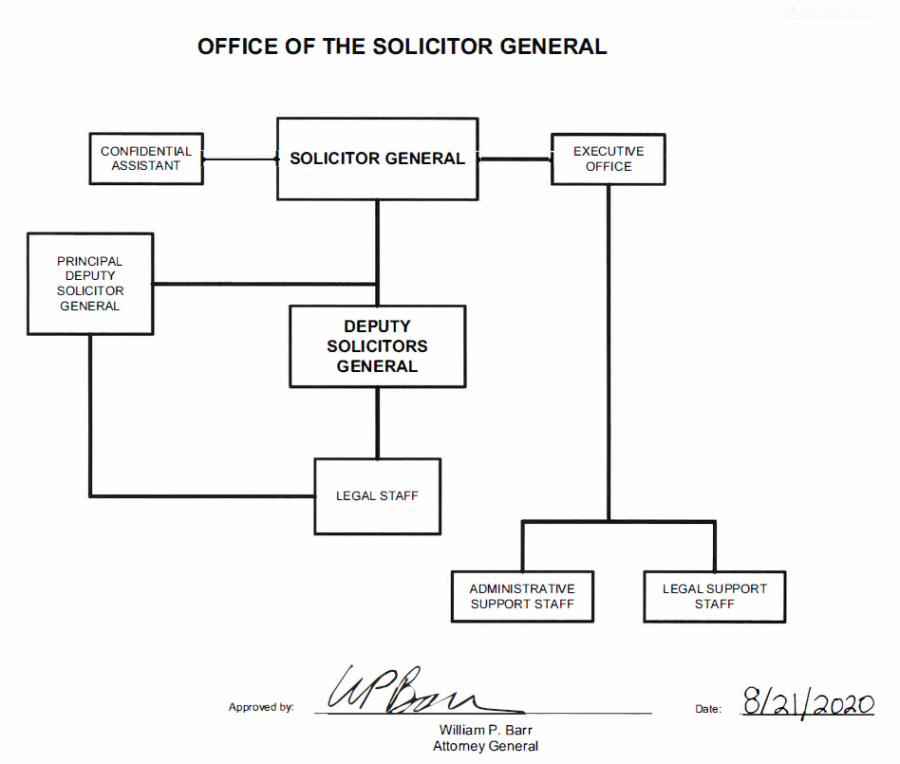
Organizational chart for the office of the Solicitor General

The solicitor general of the United States (USSG or SG) is an official in the United States Department of Justice who represents the federal government in cases before the Supreme Court of the United States. The solicitor general is the fourth-highest-ranking official in the Justice Department. The solicitor general is appointed by the president and confirmed by the Senate, and he or she reports directly to the United States attorney general.

The solicitor general's office argues on behalf of the federal government in almost every Supreme Court case in which the United States is a party and also represents in most cases in which the government has filed a brief as amicus curiae. In the United States courts of appeals, the solicitor general's office reviews cases decided against the United States and determines whether the government will seek review in the Supreme Court. The solicitor general's office also reviews cases decided against the United States in the United States district courts and decides whether the government will file an appeal.

The current U.S. solicitor general is D. John Sauer.

== Creation ==
The office was created June 22, 1870 by the efforts of Thomas Jenckes, a representative from Rhode Island, along with Dorman Eaton and William Evarts.

== Composition of the Office of the Solicitor General ==
The solicitor general is assisted by four deputy solicitors general and seventeen assistants to the solicitor general. Three of the deputies are career attorneys in the Department of Justice. The remaining deputy is known as the principal deputy, sometimes called the political deputy and, like the solicitor general, typically leaves at the end of an administration.

The solicitor general or one of the deputies typically presents the most important cases in the Supreme Court. Other cases may be argued by one of the assistants or another government attorney. The solicitor general tends to argue six to nine cases per Supreme Court term, while deputies argue four to five cases and assistants argue two to three cases each.

== Significance ==
The solicitor general, who has offices in the Supreme Court Building as well as the Department of Justice headquarters, has been called the "tenth justice" as a result of the close relationship between the justices and the solicitor general (and their respective staffs of clerks and deputies). As the most frequent advocate before the Court, the Office of the Solicitor General generally argues dozens of times each term. Furthermore, when the Office of the Solicitor General endorses a petition for certiorari, review is frequently granted, which is influential given that only 75 to 125 of the over 7,500 petitions submitted each term are granted review by the Court.

The solicitor general is considered an influential and knowledgeable member of the legal community with regard to Supreme Court litigation. Five solicitors general have later served on the Supreme Court: William Howard Taft (who served as the 27th president of the United States before becoming chief justice of the United States), Stanley Forman Reed, Robert H. Jackson, Thurgood Marshall, and Elena Kagan. Some who have had other positions in the Office of the Solicitor General have also later been appointed to the Supreme Court. For example, Chief Justice John Roberts was the principal deputy solicitor general during the George H. W. Bush administration and Associate Justice Samuel Alito was an assistant to the solicitor general. The last former solicitor general to be successfully nominated to the court was Justice Elena Kagan. Only one former solicitor general has been nominated to the Supreme Court unsuccessfully, that being Robert Bork; however, no sitting solicitor general has ever been denied such an appointment. Eight other solicitors general have served on the United States Courts of Appeals.

Within the Justice Department, the solicitor general exerts significant influence on all appeals brought by the department. The solicitor general is the only U.S. officer who is statutorily required to be "learned in the law". Whenever the DOJ wins at the trial stage and the losing party appeals, the concerned division of the DOJ responds automatically and proceeds to defend the ruling in the appellate process. However, if the DOJ is the losing party at the trial stage, an appeal can only be brought with the permission of the solicitor general. For example, should the tort division lose a jury trial in federal district court, that ruling cannot be appealed by the Appellate Office without the approval of the solicitor general.

== Call for the views of the solicitor general ==
When determining whether to grant certiorari in a case where the federal government is not a party, the Court will sometimes request that the solicitor general weigh in, a procedure referred to as a "call for the views of the solicitor general" (CVSG). In response to a CVSG, the solicitor general will file a brief opining on whether the petition should be granted and, usually, which party should prevail.

Although the CVSG is technically an invitation, the solicitor general's office treats it as tantamount to a command. Philip Elman, who served as an attorney in the solicitor general's office and who was the primary author of the federal government's brief in Brown v. Board of Education, wrote, "When the Supreme Court invites you, that's the equivalent of a royal command. An invitation from the Supreme Court just can't be rejected."

The Court typically issues a CVSG where the justices believe that the petition is important, and may be considering granting it, but would like a legal opinion before making that decision. Examples include where there is a federal interest involved in the case; where there is a new issue for which there is no established precedent; or where an issue has evolved, perhaps becoming more complex or affecting other issues.

Although there is usually no deadline by which the solicitor general is required to respond to a CVSG, briefs in response to the CVSG are generally filed at three times of the year: late May, allowing the petition to be considered before the Court breaks for summer recess; August, allowing the petition to go on the "summer list", to be considered at the end of recess; and December, allowing the case to be argued in the remainder of the current Supreme Court term.

The Supreme Court has also occasionally invited a state attorney general to express a view on a petition related to that state. In 2009, for the first time, the invitation was directed instead to a state solicitor general, James Ho of Texas, earning the request the nickname "CVSG-Texas".

== Traditions ==
Several traditions have developed since the Office of Solicitor General was established in 1870. Most obviously to spectators at oral argument before the Court, the solicitor general and their deputies traditionally appear in formal morning coats, although Elena Kagan, the first woman to hold the office on other than an acting basis, elected to forgo the practice.

During oral argument, the members of the Court often address the solicitor general as "General". Some legal commentators such as Michael Herz and Timothy Sandefur have disagreed with this usage, saying that "general" is a postpositive adjective (which modifies the noun "solicitor"), and is not a title itself.

Another tradition is the practice of confession of error. If the government prevailed in the lower court but the solicitor general disagrees with the result, the solicitor general may confess error, after which the Supreme Court will vacate the lower court's ruling and send the case back for reconsideration.

== List of solicitors general ==
Denotes acting capacity.

Image	Name	Start	End	President(s)
	Benjamin Bristow	October 11, 1870	November 15, 1872	Ulysses Grant (1869–1877)
	Samuel Phillips	December 11, 1872	May 1, 1885	Ulysses Grant (1869–1877)
	Samuel Phillips	December 11, 1872	May 1, 1885	Rutherford Hayes (1877–1881)
	Samuel Phillips	December 11, 1872	May 1, 1885	James Garfield (1881)
	Samuel Phillips	December 11, 1872	May 1, 1885	Chester Arthur (1881–1885)
	Samuel Phillips	December 11, 1872	May 1, 1885	Grover Cleveland (1885–1889)
	John Goode	May 1, 1885	August 5, 1886	Grover Cleveland (1885–1889)
	George Jenks	July 30, 1886	May 29, 1889	Grover Cleveland (1885–1889)
	Orlow Chapman	May 29, 1889	January 19, 1890	Benjamin Harrison (1889–1893)
	William Taft	February 4, 1890	March 20, 1892	Benjamin Harrison (1889–1893)
	Charles Aldrich	March 21, 1892	May 28, 1893	Benjamin Harrison (1889–1893)
	Lawrence Maxwell	April 6, 1893	January 30, 1895	Grover Cleveland (1893–1897)
	Holmes Conrad	February 6, 1895	July 1, 1897	Grover Cleveland (1893–1897)
	John Richards	July 6, 1897	March 16, 1903	William McKinley (1897–1901)
	Henry Hoyt	February 25, 1903	March 31, 1909	Theodore Roosevelt (1901–1909)
	Lloyd Bowers	April 1, 1909	September 9, 1910	William Taft (1909–1913)
	Frederick Lehmann	December 12, 1910	July 15, 1912	William Taft (1909–1913)
	William Bullitt	July 16, 1912	March 11, 1913	William Taft (1909–1913)
	John Davis	August 30, 1913	November 26, 1918	Woodrow Wilson (1913–1921)
	Alexander King	November 27, 1918	May 23, 1920	Woodrow Wilson (1913–1921)
	William Frierson	June 1, 1920	June 30, 1921	Woodrow Wilson (1913–1921)
	James Beck	June 1, 1921	May 11, 1925	Warren Harding (1921–1923)
	William Mitchell	June 4, 1925	March 5, 1929	Calvin Coolidge (1923–1929)
	Charles Hughes	May 27, 1929	April 16, 1930	Herbert Hoover (1929–1933)
	Thomas Thacher	March 22, 1930	May 4, 1933	Herbert Hoover (1929–1933)
	James Biggs	May 5, 1933	March 24, 1935	Franklin Roosevelt (1933–1945)
	Stanley Reed	March 25, 1935	January 30, 1938	Franklin Roosevelt (1933–1945)
	Robert Jackson	March 5, 1938	January 17, 1940	Franklin Roosevelt (1933–1945)
	Francis Biddle	January 22, 1940	September 4, 1941	Franklin Roosevelt (1933–1945)
	Charles Fahy	November 15, 1941	September 27, 1945	Franklin Roosevelt (1933–1945)
	Howard McGrath	October 4, 1945	October 7, 1946	Harry Truman (1945–1953)
	Philip Perlman	July 30, 1947	August 15, 1952	Harry Truman (1945–1953)
	Walter Cummings	December 2, 1952	March 1, 1953	Harry Truman (1945–1953)
	Simon Sobeloff	February 10, 1954	July 19, 1956	Dwight Eisenhower (1953–1961)
	Lee Rankin	August 4, 1956	January 23, 1961	Dwight Eisenhower (1953–1961)
	Archibald Cox	January 24, 1961	July 31, 1965	John F. Kennedy (1961–1963)
	Thurgood Marshall	August 11, 1965	August 30, 1967	Lyndon Johnson (1963–1969)
	Erwin Griswold	October 12, 1967	June 25, 1973	Lyndon Johnson (1963–1969)
	Robert Bork	June 27, 1973	January 20, 1977	Richard Nixon (1969–1974)
	Robert Bork	June 27, 1973	January 20, 1977	Gerald Ford (1974–1977)
	Daniel Friedman; Acting	January 20, 1977	March 4, 1977	Jimmy Carter (1977–1981)
	Wade McCree	March 4, 1977	January 20, 1981	Jimmy Carter (1977–1981)
	Rex Lee	August 6, 1981	June 1, 1985	Ronald Reagan (1981–1989)
	Charles Fried	June 1, 1985	October 23, 1985	Ronald Reagan (1981–1989)
	Charles Fried	October 23, 1985	January 20, 1989	Ronald Reagan (1981–1989)
	William Bryson; Acting	January 20, 1989	May 27, 1989	George H. W. Bush (1989–1993)
	Ken Starr	May 27, 1989	January 20, 1993	George H. W. Bush (1989–1993)
	William Bryson; Acting	January 20, 1993	June 7, 1993	Bill Clinton (1993–2001)
	Drew Days	June 7, 1993	June 28, 1996	Bill Clinton (1993–2001)
	Walter Dellinger; Acting	June 28, 1996	November 7, 1997	Bill Clinton (1993–2001)
	Seth Waxman	November 7, 1997	January 20, 2001	Bill Clinton (1993–2001)
	Barbara Underwood; Acting	January 20, 2001	June 13, 2001	George W. Bush (2001–2009)
	Ted Olson	June 13, 2001	July 13, 2004	George W. Bush (2001–2009)
	Paul Clement	July 13, 2004	June 13, 2005	George W. Bush (2001–2009)
	Paul Clement	June 13, 2005	June 2, 2008	George W. Bush (2001–2009)
	Gregory Garre	June 2, 2008	October 2, 2008	George W. Bush (2001–2009)
	Gregory Garre	October 2, 2008	January 20, 2009	George W. Bush (2001–2009)
	Edwin Kneedler; Acting	January 20, 2009	March 20, 2009	Barack Obama (2009–2017)
	Elena Kagan	March 20, 2009	May 17, 2010	Barack Obama (2009–2017)
	Neal Katyal; Acting	May 17, 2010	June 9, 2011	Barack Obama (2009–2017)
	Don Verrilli	June 9, 2011	June 25, 2016	Barack Obama (2009–2017)
	Ian Gershengorn; Acting	June 25, 2016	January 20, 2017	Barack Obama (2009–2017)
	Noel Francisco; Acting	January 20, 2017	March 10, 2017	Donald Trump (2017–2021)
	Jeff Wall; Acting	March 10, 2017	September 19, 2017	Donald Trump (2017–2021)
	Noel Francisco	September 19, 2017	July 3, 2020	Donald Trump (2017–2021)
	Jeff Wall; Acting	July 3, 2020	January 20, 2021	Donald Trump (2017–2021)
	Elizabeth Prelogar; Acting	January 20, 2021	August 11, 2021	Joe Biden (2021–2025)
	Brian Fletcher; Acting	August 11, 2021	October 28, 2021	Joe Biden (2021–2025)
	Elizabeth Prelogar	October 28, 2021	January 20, 2025	Joe Biden (2021–2025)
	Sarah M. Harris; Acting	January 20, 2025	April 4, 2025	Donald Trump (2025–present)
	John Sauer	April 4, 2025	present	Donald Trump (2025–present)

Note: Some terms overlap because the incumbent remained in office after a successor was named. The office has been vacant at times while awaiting the nomination or confirmation of a successor.

== List of notable principal deputy solicitors general ==
- Paul M. Bator – October 1982 to December 1983
- Donald B. Ayer – June 1986 to December 1988
- John Roberts – October 1989 to January 1993 (became Chief Justice)
- Paul Bender – 1993 to 1996
- Seth Waxman – 1996 to November 13, 1997 (became Solicitor General)
- Barbara Underwood – March 23, 1998 to June 11, 2001 (acting SG from January to June 2001)
- Paul D. Clement – February 2001 to July 11, 2004 (became acting SG)
- Gregory G. Garre – September 2005 - June 19, 2008 (became acting SG)
- Neal Katyal – February 3, 2009 to May 17, 2010 (became acting SG)
- Leondra Kruger – acting principal deputy SG named on May 17, 2010, to June 9, 2011 (became California Supreme Court Associate Justice)
- Neal Katyal – June 9, 2011 to August 26, 2011
- Sri Srinivasan – August 26, 2011 to May 24, 2013 (became Chief Judge of D.C. Circuit)
- Ian Heath Gershengorn – September 2013 to June 25, 2016 (became Acting SG)
- Noel Francisco – January 20, 2017 to March 10, 2017 (became SG)
- Jeff Wall – March 10, 2017 to January 20, 2021 (became Acting SG)
- Elizabeth Prelogar – January 20, 2021 - October 28, 2021 (became SG)
- Brian Fletcher - October 28, 2021 - January 20, 2025 (became Acting SG)
- Sarah M. Harris - April 4, 2025 - Present (became Acting SG)
