= Keswick Christian School =

Coordinates: 27.8225251°N 82.7789909°W

Location
- 10101 54th Ave N St. Petersburg, Florida 33708; United States

Information
- School type: Private
- Religious affiliations: Christian, Protestant
- Established: 1953
- Founder: Ruth Munce
- Grades: 2K-12
- Colors: Green and white
- Mascot: Crusader
- Website: http://www.keswickchristian.org/

Keswick Christian School is a private, pre-Kindergarten-twelfth grade, Christian school in the outlying area of St. Petersburg, Florida. It was founded as Grace Livingston Hill Memorial School in 1953. It had an enrollment of around 650 students in 2007. It has an interdenominational student body, mostly of Protestant background. The campus spans 30 acres (12 ha), set among tall oak trees reminiscent of its once rural surroundings, and is about half of a mile outside Seminole, Florida, whose city council annexed the school into its city limits in 2000. The school is accredited by the Association of Christian Schools International and the Southern Association of Colleges and Schools.

== Founding ==
Following a temporary location started with help from Roy Gustafson and her other friends at "the Baptist Church on 22nd Avenue South" in St. Petersburg in 1952, Ruth Munce founded Grace Livingston Hill Memorial School in 1953, naming it after her mother, an author of more than 100 Christian-themed romance novels. Munce felt called by God to establish this private educational facility because no other Christian school existed in Pinellas County, so she purchased a 13-acre (5.3 ha) site, an old chicken farm off Seminole Boulevard on the outskirts of St. Petersburg, Florida. Munce's philosophy that "God would be the sum of the equation, the Bible a textbook" was put into motion. Classes were held in the chicken house and log cabin-style farmhouse. Munce taught Bible and English courses and remained principal of the school for 15 years, bringing enrollment to as many as 200 students a year. In 1968, at age 70, she undertook an eight-year stint teaching at Nairobi Bible Institute in Kenya.

== Name change and growth ==
Headquartered on the same site as the school were Keswick radio stations, WKES-FM and WGNB AM, and the Southern Keswick Bible Conference. Bill Caldwell operated these facilities, and to him, Munce turned over the school in 1961. The following year, the school name was changed to Keswick Christian School to reflect its new ownership. The Keswick name is said to come from a holiness movement that originated in Keswick, England, in the late nineteenth century. By 1970, the school's enrollment rose to 480 students, giving the board of directors ample reason to expand the school to offer a senior high, which was completed in 1975 with the first senior class graduating in 1978. Also around this time, the school became a mission of Moody Bible Institute in Chicago, an affiliation that lasted 18 years. The school espouses a fundamentalist Christian worldview, as Keswick alumnus Christine Rosen describes in her book, My Fundamentalist Education.

Moving into the 1980s, school officials broke ground in February 1983 for constructing a new library, but to do so, part of Keswick's history was removed. The early log-cabin farmhouse, where Keswick's first classes were held, was partially demolished, Leaving only one room, maintained for elementary music classes. The library was named Ruth Munce Library after the school's founder. In the early 1990s, the Upham Music Building was constructed to better accommodate band and choral instruction and rehearsal.

== Parting ways with Moody ==
In 1996, Moody Bible Institute decided that their future focus would be solely on higher education, so the college amicably parted ways with Keswick. Moody sold its conference center property, established in 1962 on Lake Kersky, including a 48-room lodge, a 550-seat chapel and three homes, to Keswick for $600,000. A fundraising campaign ensued to fund the purchase; however, this was only the beginning of the school's endeavors to reach new goals through a capital campaign. Moody Radio's FM radio station, WKES, located on the property was not a part of this transaction. As of 1996, Moody continues to own and operate WKES from studios on the school's campus, although the station's city of license is now officially Lakeland.

== Foundations for the future ==
In 1999, school officials announced their expansion plans to add a two-story 18,690-square-foot (1,736 m^{2}) building that would house administrative offices, classrooms and a state-of-the-art media center. The following year, the Seminole city council changed the school's unincorporated status with Pinellas County, annexing it into Seminole city limits. At a Seminole city council meeting in July 2000, neighbors of the school aired their grievances concerning the expansion. They argued the proposed building would change the look of the neighborhood and generate more traffic and noise. This council meeting, however, was not to discuss the school's expansion but to decide its request for rezoning it from residential status to public/semipublic status. The re-designation was granted after tough debate. In 2001, Keswick officials scrapped the plan for the large, two-story building; instead, minor modifications were made, such as installing a fence on the grounds along 54th Avenue, building a paved running track, improving drainage and paving dirt parking lots.

Despite the false start, Keswick embarked on a three-year capital campaign called Foundations for the Future in 2003, the fiftieth anniversary of the school. The $4.5 million campaign was completed in 2007. Highlights of the campaign include a new 23,000-square-foot (2,100 m^{2}) senior high school building; a refurbished preschool and new two-year-old program; and a relocated junior high building.

== Notable alumni ==
- Christa Benton, long-distance runner
- Bruce G. Blowers, singer-songwriter
- Samantha Dorman, fashion model, actor
- Dan Lothian, journalist
- Natalie Gillespie, author and journalist
- Gabrielle Reece, beach volleyball player, fashion model, writer
- Christine Rosen, author, historian, scholar
