= Lake Seminole (Pinellas County, Florida) =

Lake in the state of Florida, United States

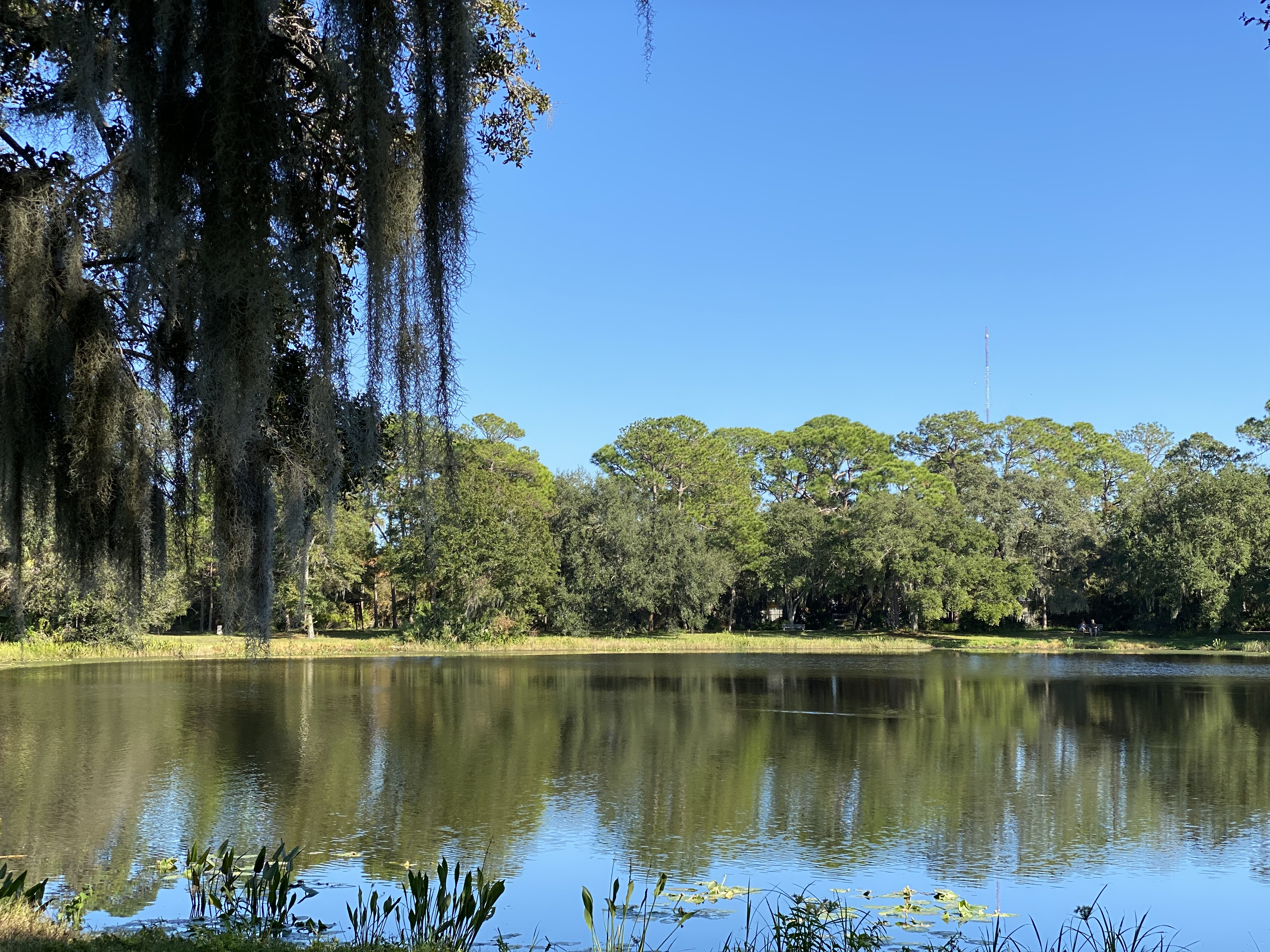

- Location within Florida Location within the United States
- Location: Pinellas County, Florida
- Coordinates: 27.84°N 82.78°W
- Type: dammed sea inlet
- Catchment area: 5.468 sq mi (14.16 km^{2})
- Basin countries: United States
- Max. length: 3.26 mi (5.25 km)
- Max. width: 0.5 mi (0.80 km)
- Surface area: 702 acres (2.84 km^{2})
- Surface elevation: 3 ft (0.91 m)
- Settlements: Largo, Florida

Lake Seminole (/ˈsɛmɪnoʊl/, SEM-i-nohl) is a freshwater lake in urban Pinellas County in the U.S. state of Florida. The lake is located in the city of Seminole, about 20 miles (32 km) west of Tampa. Lake Seminole is the second largest lake in Pinellas County (after Lake Tarpon), with a surface area of 700 acres (2.8 km^{2}).

Once a tidal estuary, Lake Seminole was created in the 1940s by closing the upper portion of Long Bayou. Lake Seminole's watershed is unusually small for a lake of its size, draining only approximately 5.5 miles of the county, in mostly developed Seminole and Largo. Historically the watershed was much larger than its current limits, but was altered in the early 1970s to divert runoff into Long Bayou for flood relief. Due to the low volume of water, and the nutrient and pollutant rich drainage from the urbanized area surrounding the lake, water quality has been a concern, with the county developing the Lake Seminole Watershed Management Plan to protect water quality and habitat.

The weir between the lake and bayou was under emergency repair prior to the hurricanes. The situation has made the lake extremely low and the wildlife vulnerable.

On the east shore of Lake Seminole is Lake Seminole Park, a 250 acres (100 ha) county park that provides year-round public access to the lake. Popular activities on the lake include boating, jet skiing, water-skiing, and fishing. The park is also popular with families and nature enthusiasts, and includes a 2 miles (3.2 km) multi-use trail that winds through pine flat woods, a softball field, and volleyball courts.
