= Ruth Munce =

American novelist

Ruth H. Munce (January 24, 1898 – May 23, 2001) was an American romance novelist, mission teacher and founder of Keswick Christian School in St. Petersburg, Florida.

== Early life, family history ==
Born in Germantown, Pennsylvania, Ruth Glover Hill was the second daughter of Presbyterian minister, Thomas Franklin Hill, who died when she was two. As a widow, her mother, Grace Livingston Hill, author of over 100 Christian-themed romance novels, provided a comfortable lifestyle for Munce and her sibling in Swarthmore, Pennsylvania. Munce's mother was not the only writer in her family line. Her great-aunt, Isabella Macdonald Alden, was also a well-known author who wrote a series called "The Pansy Books" from the mid-to-late 19th century.

== Marriage and career ==
Around 1925, she married Gordon Munce, who was an oil executive for Gulf. The Munces adopted two sons. died in 1947. Her mother, Grace Livingston Hill, also died in 1947, in the midst of writing the novel, Mary Arden. Lippincott Publishers asked Munce to finish her mother's book. Writing under the pen-name, Ruth Livingston Hill, Munce attempted to continue in her mother's style of writing. She says that J. B. Lippincott could not tell the difference between what content was hers and what was her mother's, and Munce refused to show him any of the written variations. Completion of her mother's novel led to her own career as an author, writing six more Christian romances. She also wrote a book of Bible studies and a textbook on the book of Genesis, published in the mid-1980s.

== The move south ==
Following the deaths of her mother and husband, Munce moved to Tampa Bay with her two sons. She performed a three-month stint at St. Petersburg High School, teaching Bible history until the School Board decided to do away with this subject because it would open the way for more "subversive groups." At a crossroads in her career, Munce chose to finish her college education that she had begun at Wheaton College, but was interrupted by World War I. She earned a teacher's certificate.

== School founder ==
Attempting to fill a void in Christian education - something she wanted for her own children - in Pinellas County, Munce, with the help of friends, started a Christian school in Fall 1952 in a temporary location at the "Baptist Church on 22nd Avenue South." About 30 to 40 elementary students attended, perpetuating her passion to open a permanent school, which she did with her own financial backing in 1953 in unincorporated Pinellas County, naming it Grace Livingston Hill Memorial School, in honor of her mother.

Munce remained principal of the school she founded for at least ten years, teaching Bible and English classes in her tenure. In 1961, she turned the school over to Bill Caldwell, who was operating Keswick radio stations, WKES-FM and WGNB-AM, and the Southern Keswick Bible Conference on the same site as the school. Reflecting the new ownership, the school was renamed Keswick Christian School in 1962.

== Missionary ==
In 1968, at age 70, Munce undertook an eight-year stint teaching at Nairobi Bible Institute in Kenya. Her book, What Happened?: A Study in Genesis (A Textbook for Christian Schools or Home Bible Study Groups) is based on her teachings while in Kenya. Returning home to Pinellas County in the mid-1970s, Munce made her missions local, leading up to 14 interdenominational Bible studies a week, a routine she continued well into her nineties, with participants admiring the "breadth of her knowledge".

== End of life ==
For her 102nd and 103rd birthdays, Munce celebrated with Keswick students at her place of residence at Pinecrest Place in Largo, where she lived for approximately five years.

Munce died May 23, 2001, at Mariner Health of Belleair, Florida, where she had been a resident for a week.
