= Raymond Macdonald Alden =

19th/20th-century American scholar and educator

- Born: March 30, 1873; New Hartford, New York
- Died: September 27, 1924 (aged 51); Philadelphia, Pennsylvania
- Mother: Isabella Macdonald Alden

Academic background
- Education: Rollins College; University of Pennsylvania; Harvard University
- Thesis: Rise of Formal Satire in England under Classical Influence (1894)
- Doctoral advisor: Felix Emanuel Schelling

Raymond Macdonald Alden (March 30, 1873 – September 27, 1924) was an American scholar and educator.

== Biography ==
Alden was born on March 30, 1873, in New Hartford, New York. His parents were the writer Isabella Macdonald Alden and Reverend Gustavus Rossenberg Alden. He studied at Rollins College in Winter Park, Florida, and at the University of Pennsylvania, from which he graduated in 1894 with a Ph.D. his dissertation was on "Rise of Formal Satire in England under Classical Influence" and his advisor was Felix Emanuel Schelling. He took post-graduate studies there at Penn and at Harvard. In 1894–95 he was instructor in English at Columbian University (now George Washington University); in 1896–97 assistant in English at Harvard; and in 1898–99 senior fellow in English at the University of Pennsylvania. He was chosen to fill the position of assistant professor of English literature and rhetoric at Stanford University in 1899, then became associate professor there in 1909. He accepted the chair of English at the University of Illinois in 1911.

He edited several plays of Shakespeare and other Elizabethan dramatists and in 1910 an edition of Thoreau's Walden. Alden also became known as a contributor to educational journals and short stories to magazines. In 1905, his story "In the Promised Land" won a $1,000 prize for third place in a Collier's Weekly contest. In 1913 he edited an edition of Shakespeare's Sonnets and A Lover's Complaint.

He is best remembered today for his published children's stories, most notably the Christmas story Why the Chimes Rang, which remained in illustrated print for over five decades and was widely performed as a theater production.

Raymond Macdonald Alden died in Philadelphia on September 27, 1924.

Raymond had sons, one of whom was Raymond Macdonald Alden Jr. who was born in Palo Alto California on November 17, 1921. His son graduated from Stanford, where his father had taught, with a degree in engineering and was an executive in the telephone industry.

== Selected works ==
- The Rise of Formal Satire in England (1899)
- The Art of Debate (1900)
- On Seeing an Elizabethan Play (1903); also cataloged under the title of the featured play, The Trve Historie of the Knyght of the Bvrning Pestle, LCCN 03-7775
- Consolatio (1903)
- The Knights of the Silver Shield, illustrated by Katharine Hayward Greenland (1906); illus. W. R. Lohse (1923)
- The Great Walled Country (1906)
- An Introduction to Poetry (1909)
- Why the Chimes Rang (1909)
- A Palace Made by Music (1910)
- Tennyson, How to Know him (1917)
- Critical Essays of the Early Nineteenth Century (1921)
- Shakespeare (1922)
- The Boy Who Found the King: A Tournament of Stories, illus. W. R. Lohse (1922); reissued as Once There Was a King: A Tournament of Stories, illus. Evelyn Copelman (1946)

Why the Chimes Rang is the story of a grand old church with beautiful chimes which mysteriously ring out every Christmas Eve whenever someone places an especially pleasing gift on the altar as an offering, and how a miracle occurs after the chimes have fallen silent for years. The story is a sort of variation on the Jongleur de Notre Dame and Little Drummer Boy themes.

The Knights of the Silver Shield, is included in Olive Beaupre Miller's Book House for Children anthology of children's literature. It is a story about how sometimes the resistance of temptation and the simple act of gate-keeping can be an act of valor to rival all others.

"A Tournament of Stories" is the subtitle of Alden's last children's book. Its frame story features a kingdom whose Chief Story-Teller has recently died. Nine story-tellers finally vie for the position by telling one story each to Prince John, Princess Jane, and a jury of children.
