= WKES =

- Lakeland, Florida; United States
- Broadcast area: Tampa Bay area
- Frequency: 91.1 MHz
- Branding: Moody Radio Florida

Programming
- Format: Christian talk and teaching
- Affiliations: Moody Radio

Ownership
- Owner: Moody Bible Institute; (The Moody Bible Institute of Chicago)

History
- First air date: May 26, 1976
- Former call signs: WCIE (1976–1997)
- Call sign meaning: Keswick Christian School (founders of WKES and associated with Moody)

Technical information
- Licensing authority: FCC
- Facility ID: 19871
- Class: C1
- ERP: 100,000 watts
- HAAT: 128 meters (420 ft)
- Transmitter coordinates: 28°4′46″N 82°2′27″W
- Translator: See § Translators
- Repeater: (see article)

Links
- Public license information: Public file; LMS
- Website: moodyradioflorida.fm

WKES (91.1 MHz) is a non-commercial, listener-supported FM radio station broadcasting a Christian talk and teaching radio format. Licensed to Lakeland, Florida, it serves the Tampa Bay area from its studios at Keswick Christian School in Seminole. The station is owned by the Moody Bible Institute of Chicago and features programming from Moody Radio.

WKES is the flagship station of the statewide Moody Radio Florida network, which includes:

Call sign	Frequency	City of license	Facility ID	ERP W	Height m (ft)	Class	FCC info
WHGN	91.9 FM	Crystal River, Florida	11026	41,000	165 m (541 ft)	C2	FCC (WHGN)
WKZM	104.3 FM	Sarasota, Florida	11037	25,000	81 m (266 ft)	C3	FCC (WKZM)
WSOR	90.9 FM	Naples, Florida	61506	36,000	275 m (902 ft)	C1	FCC (WSOR)

Local programming includes New Day Florida (a morning show) and Prime Time Florida (a drive-time afternoon show), plus hourly news and traffic updates, along with weather updates from former Bay News 9 meteorologist Alan Winfield.

== History ==
The station first signed on May 26, 1977, at 91.3 MHz as WCIE, a non-commercial Christian station owned by Evangel Christian School in Lakeland. In 1980, as part of a plan to increase its power, the station relocated to 91.1 MHz. In 1997, in a three way swap, Evangel Christian School sold WCIE to Paxson Broadcasting, who in turn swapped the station with Moody's WKES, which at the time was on 101.5 FM. WKES would soon move to 91.1 FM; after a brief simulcast period, its old 101.5 frequency became a commercial station under Paxson, as WILV (now WTBV, owned by Cox Radio).

== Translators ==
Call sign	Frequency	City of license	FID	ERP (W)	HAAT	Class	FCC info	Notes
W215CJ	90.9 FM	Tampa, Florida	106675	70	51 m (167 ft)	D	LMS	Relays WKES
W247AF	97.3 FM	Sarasota, Florida	84009	80	48 m (157 ft)	D	LMS	Relays WKES
W272BM	102.3 FM	Fort Myers Beach, Florida	156554	80	52 m (171 ft)	D	LMS	Relays WSOR
