= Neal Katyal =

American lawyer and academic (born 1970)

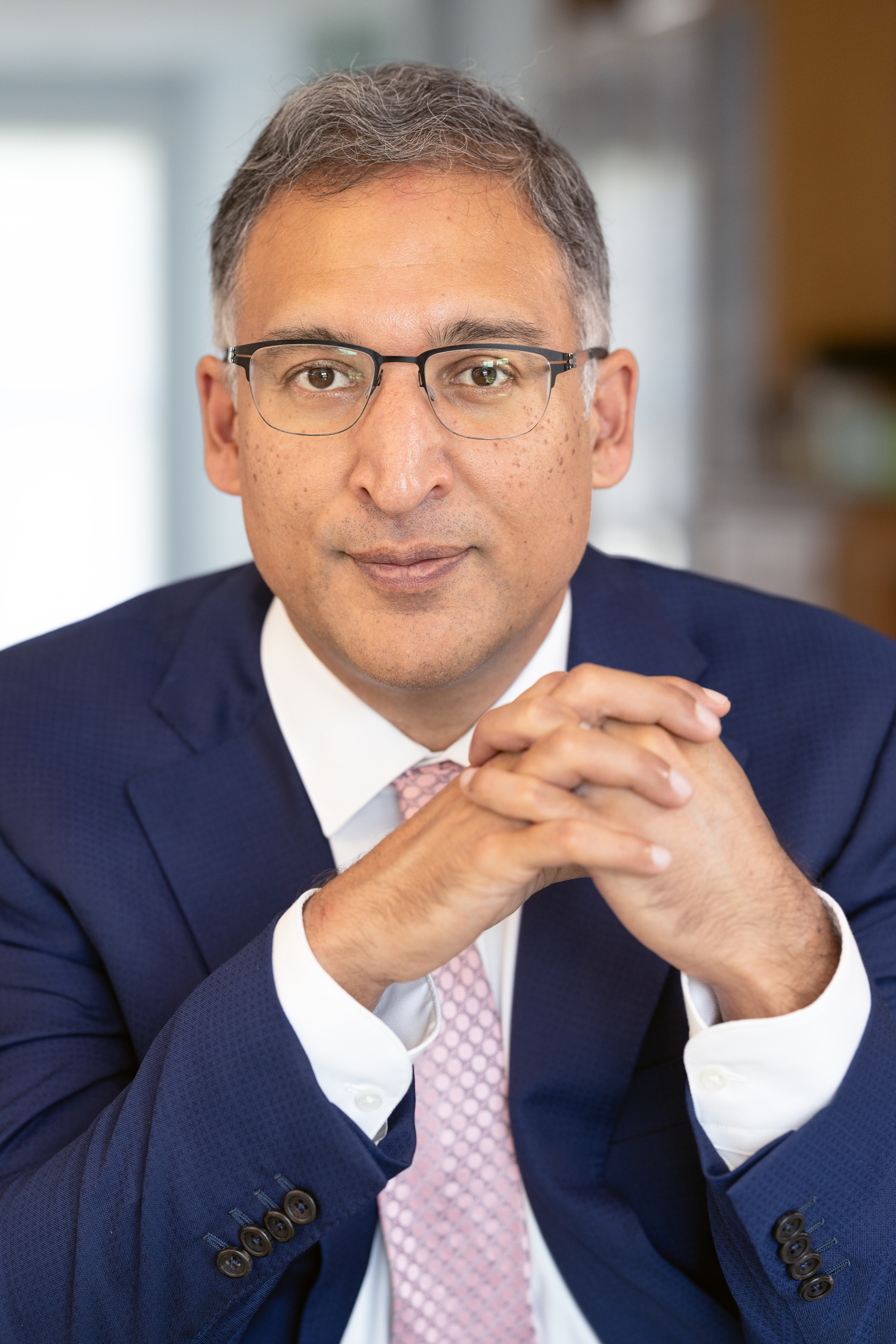
- Katyal in 2023

Principal Deputy Solicitor General of the United States
- In office June 9, 2011 – August 26, 2011
- President: Barack Obama
- Preceded by: Leondra Kruger (acting)
- Succeeded by: Sri Srinivasan
- In office February 3, 2009 – May 17, 2010
- President: Barack Obama
- Preceded by: Daryl Joseffer
- Succeeded by: Leondra Kruger (acting)

Solicitor General of the United States
- Acting; May 17, 2010 – June 9, 2011
- President: Barack Obama
- Preceded by: Elena Kagan
- Succeeded by: Donald B. Verrilli Jr.

Personal details
- Born: Neal Kumar Katyal; March 12, 1970 (age 56) Chicago, Illinois, U.S.
- Party: Democratic
- Relatives: Sonia Katyal (sister); Jeffrey Rosen (brother-in-law)
- Education: Dartmouth College (BA); Yale University (JD)

Neal Kumar Katyal (born March 12, 1970) is an American lawyer and legal scholar. He is a partner at Milbank LLP and is the Paul and Patricia Saunders professor of national security law at Georgetown University Law Center.

During the Obama administration, Katyal served as acting solicitor general of the United States from May 2010 until June 2011.

Previously he served as a lawyer in the solicitor general's office and as principal deputy solicitor general in the United States Department of Justice.

== Early life and education ==
Neal Katyal was born on March 12, 1970, in Chicago, Illinois, to immigrant parents originally from India. His mother, Pratibha, is a pediatrician and his father, Surendar, who died in 2005, was an engineer. Katyal's sister, Sonia, is also an attorney and teaches law at the University of California, Berkeley, School of Law.

Neal Katyal studied at Loyola Academy, a Jesuit Catholic high school in Wilmette, Illinois. In 1991 he graduated from Dartmouth College, where he was a member of Phi Beta Kappa, Sigma Nu fraternity, and the Dartmouth Forensic Union.

Katyal then attended Yale Law School. He was an editor of the Yale Law Journal and studied under Akhil Amar and Bruce Ackerman, with whom in 1995 and 1996 he published articles in law-review and political-opinion journals. After receiving his J.D. (Juris Doctor) degree in 1995, Katyal clerked for Judge Guido Calabresi of the U.S. Court of Appeals for the Second Circuit, then for Justice Stephen Breyer of the United States Supreme Court.

== Career ==
President Bill Clinton commissioned Katyal to write a report on the need for more legal pro bono work. In 1999 he drafted special counsel regulations, which guided the Mueller investigation of the Russian government's efforts to interfere in the 2016 presidential election. He also represented Vice President Al Gore as co-counsel in Bush v. Gore, and represented the deans of most major private law schools in Grutter v. Bollinger.

While serving at the Justice Department, Katyal argued numerous cases before the Supreme Court, including his successful defense (by an 8–1 decision) of the constitutionality of the Voting Rights Act of 1965 in Northwest Austin v. Holder. Katyal also successfully argued in favor of the constitutionality of the Affordable Care Act, and won a unanimous decision from the Supreme Court defending former Attorney General John Ashcroft against alleged abuses of civil liberties in the war on terror in Ashcroft v. al-Kidd. Katyal is also the only head of the Solicitor General's office to argue in the Court of Appeals for the Federal Circuit.

As Acting Solicitor General, Katyal succeeded Elena Kagan, whom President Barack Obama chose to replace the retiring Supreme Court Associate Justice John Paul Stevens.

On May 24, 2011, speaking as Acting Solicitor General, Katyal delivered the keynote speech at the Department of Justice's Great Hall marking Asian American and Pacific Islander Heritage Month. Developing comments he had posted officially on May 20, Katyal issued the Justice Department's first public confession of its 1942 ethics lapse in arguing the Hirabayashi and Korematsu cases in the US Supreme Court, which had resulted in upholding the internment of American citizens of Japanese descent. He called those prosecutions – which were only vacated in the 1980s – "blots" on the reputation of his office, which the Supreme Court explicitly considers as deserving of "special credence" when arguing cases, and "an important reminder" of the need for absolute candor in arguing the United States government's position on every case. Katyal also lectured at Fordham Law School concerning that decision.

Katyal was critical of the Guantanamo Bay detention camp. While teaching at Georgetown University Law Center for two decades, he was lead counsel for the Guantanamo Bay detainees in the Supreme Court case Hamdan v. Rumsfeld (2006), which held that Guantanamo military commissions set up by the George W. Bush administration to try detainees "violate both the UCMJ and the four Geneva Conventions."

Upon leaving the Obama administration, Katyal returned to Georgetown University Law Center, but also became a partner at the global law firm Hogan Lovells. He specializes in constitutional law, national security, criminal defense, and intellectual property law, as well as running the appellate practice once run by John Roberts. During law school Katyal clerked one summer at Hogan Lovells, where he worked for Roberts before Roberts became a judge.

In 2015, Katyal had a cameo in the third season of the American television series House of Cards, portraying a lawyer arguing a case in the Supreme Court .

In 2017, The American Lawyer magazine named Katyal its Grand Prize Litigator of the Year for 2016 and 2017.

Katyal has been criticized for filing briefs taking anti-union positions in two Supreme Court cases, Janus v. AFSCME. and Epic Systems Corp. v. Lewis. Katyal's employer, Hogan Lovells, characterized Katyal's successes in these cases as a "major win for employers."

In 2019, Katyal published his first book, Impeach: The Case Against Donald Trump, with Sam Koppelman. Katyal and Koppelman also wrote a TIME editorial titled "Impeaching Trump Is Imperative to Preserving Our Democracy."

In 2020, Katyal represented Nestlé and Cargill at the Supreme Court in Nestlé USA, Inc. v. Doe, a class-action suit brought by former enslaved children who were kidnapped and forced to work on cocoa farms in the Ivory Coast. Katyal's argument was that Nestlé and Cargill should not be held liable under United States law for their use of child slave labor because international law does not apply to corporations. Katyal cited as an example that the company which supplied Zyklon B to the Nazis to kill Jews and other minorities in extermination camps was not indicted at the Nuremberg trials. Katyal was criticized by publications including The New Republic.

In 2021, Katyal represented financial giant Citigroup in their efforts to recoup a mistaken transfer of $900 million to creditors of Revlon Inc. He also worked with the prosecution team in State v. Chauvin.

As of May 2021, Katyal is a board member of Chamath Palihapitiya's venture capital firm Social Capital.

In 2022, Katyal argued for the respondents in Moore v. Harper before the Supreme Court, a case involving election law, redistricting and the independent state legislature theory. The court rejected the independent legislature theory and thus upheld Katyal's position by a 6–3 vote.

Also in 2022, Katyal represented Johnson & Johnson in a civil suit against the company for selling talcum baby powder contaminated with carcinogens. His billing rate for this was $2,465 per hour.

On February 12, 2025, Milbank announced that Katyal will be leading the appellate practice of their Washington D.C. office.

On November 5, 2025, Katyal argued on behalf of small businesses and trade associations in Learning Resources, Inc. v. Trump. In February 2026, the Supreme Court held that IEEPA did not authorize the challenged tariffs.

In 2026, Katyal represented prediction market Kalshi in cases by state regulators in Utah, Nevada, Ohio, Maryland, Connecticut, and Tennessee who alleged that Kalshi was running an unlicensed sports betting platform. Katyal argued that states lack the authority to regulate prediction markets as a form of gambling.

Katyal is a senior fellow at the Kettering Foundation, an American non-partisan research foundation.

== Political positions ==
Katyal has described himself as an "extremist centrist". He endorsed President Donald Trump's nomination of Neil Gorsuch to the Supreme Court in an op-ed to The New York Times. When that newspaper's public editor criticized the op-ed for failing to disclose Katyal had active cases being considered by the Court, Katyal responded that it would have been obvious he always has cases being heard by the Supreme Court. Katyal formally introduced Gorsuch on the first day of his Senate Judiciary Committee confirmation hearings.

In addition to Gorsuch, Katyal spoke highly of Trump's nomination of Brett Kavanaugh to the Supreme Court. In multiple tweets that were cited by Republican Senate Majority Leader Mitch McConnell in favor of Kavanaugh's confirmation, Katyal praised Kavanaugh's "credentials [and] hardworking nature", and described his "mentoring and guidance" of female law clerks as "a model for all of us in the legal profession". Katyal has also called Kavanaugh "incredibly likable".

== Honors and awards ==
The US Justice Department awarded Katyal the Edmund Randolph Award, the highest honor the department can bestow on a civilian. The National Law Journal named Katyal its runner-up for "Lawyer of the Year" in 2006 and in 2004 awarded him its Pro Bono award. American Lawyer Magazine considered him one of the top 50 litigators nationally. Washingtonian Magazine named him one of the 30 best living Supreme Court advocates.

== Personal life ==
Katyal is married to Joanna Rosen, a physician. His brother-in-law is Jeffrey Rosen, the NYT-bestselling author, prominent legal journalist, George Washington University Law Professor, and former President & CEO of the National Constitution Center in Philadelphia. His sister Sonia Katyal is the Chancellor's Professor of Law and co-director of the Berkeley Center for Law & Technology at UC Berkeley. His sister-in-law is the author, cultural anthropologist, and singer-songwriter Lauren Coyle Rosen, who is also a fellow at Harvard University, a former Princeton professor, the Founder of Divine Feminine Living, and host of The Divine Feminine Podcast.

Katyal attended Burning Man 2023, during which heavy rainfall caused flash flooding. He hiked six miles in the mud to get out of the festival, which he called "incredibly harrowing".

== Bibliography ==
=== Books ===
- Katyal, Neal (2019). Impeach: The Case Against Donald Trump. Mariner. ISBN 978-0358391173.

=== Articles ===
- Katyal, Neal K.; Amar, Akhil Reed (1995). "Executive Privileges and Immunities: The Nixon and Clinton Cases". Harvard Law Review. 108 (3): 701–26. doi:10.2307/1341920.
- —; Ackerman, Bruce (1995). "Our Unconventional Founding". University of Chicago Law Review. 62 (2). doi:10.2307/1600145.
- — (1997). "Deterrence's Difficulty". Michigan Law Review. 95 (8): 2385–2476.
- — (1998). "Judges As Advicegivers". Stanford Law Review. 50 (6): 1709–1834. JSTOR 1229240.
- — (2000). "Legislative Constitutional Interpretation". Duke Law Journal. 50: 1335–94.
- — (2001). "Criminal Law in Cyberspace". University of Pennsylvania Law Review. 149 (4): 1003–1114.
- — (2002). "Architecture As Crime Control". Yale Law Journal. 111 (5): 1039–1140.
- —; Tribe, Laurence H. (2002). "Waging War, Deciding Guilt: Trying the Military Tribunals". Yale Law Journal. 111 (6): 1259–1310. doi:10.2307/797612.
- — (2003). "Conspiracy Theory". Yale Law Journal. 112 (6): 1307–98. doi:10.2307/3657448.
- — (2006). "Internal Separation of Powers: Checking Today's Most Dangerous Branch from Within". Yale Law Journal. 115 (9): 2314–49.
- — (2006). "Hamdan v. Rumsfeld: The Legal Academy Goes to Practice". Harvard Law Review. 120 (1): 65–123. JSTOR 4093548.
- —; Schmidt, Thomas P. (2015). "Active Avoidance: The Modern Supreme Court and Legal Change". Harvard Law Review. 128 (8): 2109–65. JSTOR 24644103.
- Katyal, Neal (May 13, 2024). "The historic Trump court cases that we cannot see". Essay. The New Yorker. (Note: Available on website only.)

———————

Bibliography notes

== See also ==
- Barack Obama Supreme Court candidates
- List of law clerks for the second seat of the Supreme Court of the United States

Legal offices
Preceded by Daryl Joseffer	Principal Deputy Solicitor General of the United States; 2009–2010	Succeeded by Leondra Kruger; Acting
Preceded by Elena Kagan	Solicitor General of the United States; Acting; 2010–2011	Succeeded by Don Verrilli
Preceded by Leondra Kruger; Acting	Principal Deputy Solicitor General of the United States; 2011	Succeeded by Sri Srinivasan
