= Seminole High School (Pinellas County, Florida) =

Public high school in Seminole, Florida, United States

Location
- 8401 131st Street North; Seminole, Florida 33776; United States; 27°50′56″N 82°49′09″W

Information
- Type: Public
- Motto: Live by the highest you know...and the rest will follow. And "Warhawk Power... and the rest will follow"
- Established: 1962
- Principal: Alauna Brown
- Teaching staff: 65.00 (on an FTE basis)
- Grades: 9–12
- Enrollment: 1,388 (2023–2024)
- Student to teacher ratio: 21.35
- Campus: Suburban
- Colors: Dark green and orange
- Mascot: Wally the Warhawk
- Nickname: Warhawks
- Newspaper: Hawk Talk
- Yearbook: Warrior
- Website: www.pcsb.org/seminole-hs
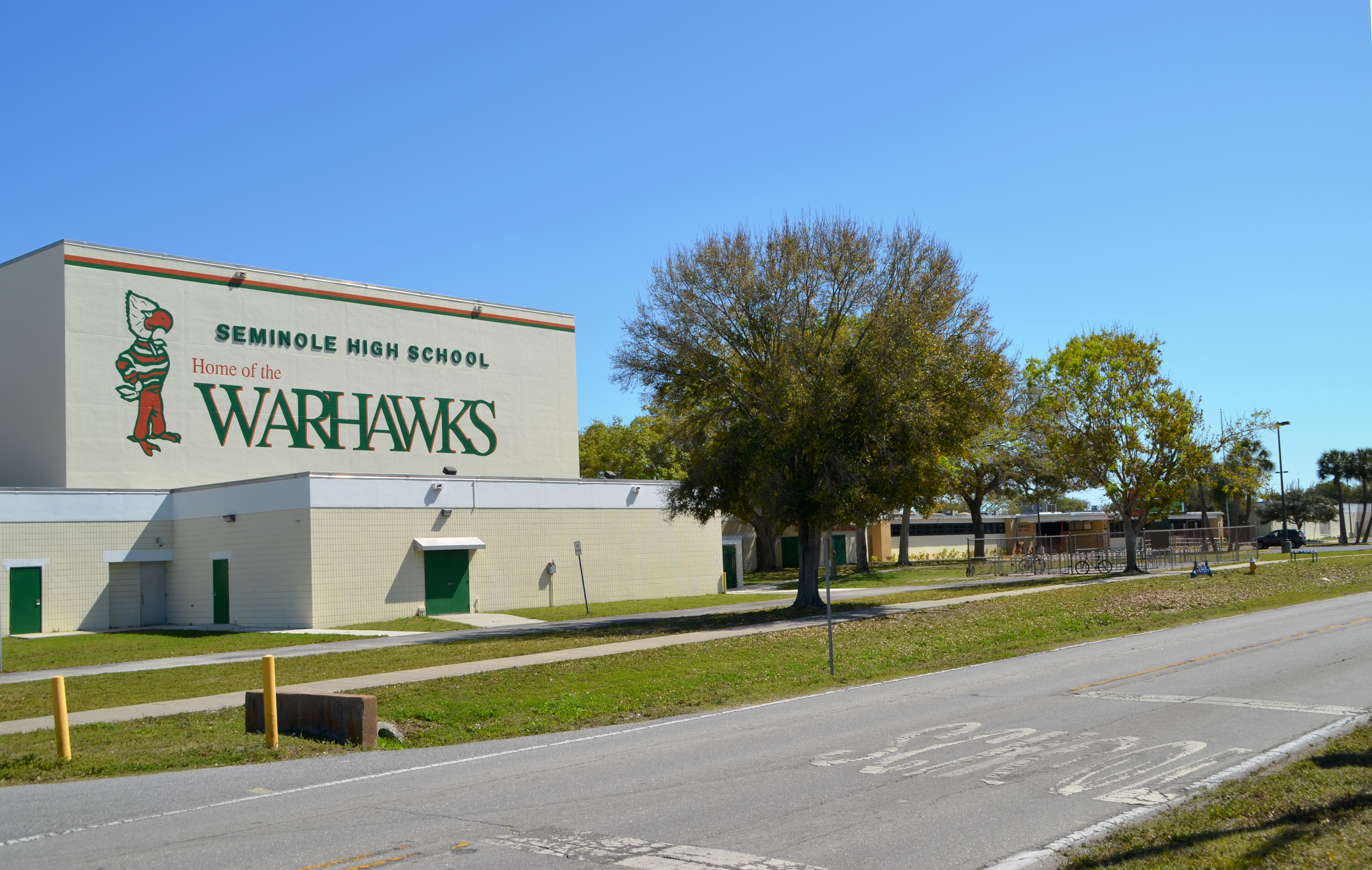

Seminole High School is a public coeducational high school located in Seminole, Florida. It is governed by the Pinellas County Schools. The school's mascot is "Wally the Warhawk". The student population is approximately 1,650.

== History ==
Prior to the opening of the school in the late summer of 1962, students in what is now known as the Seminole area attended Largo High School or Dixie Hollins High School. With rapid growth in Seminole in the late 1950s and early 1960s, it became necessary for the newly suburban area to have its own high school. The original school consisted of what is now the main building where the administration offices are located and the front cafeteria. Seminole was the first high school in Pinellas County to be air-conditioned. The current "Warhawk" stadium was built in 1967 after a lengthy fundraising drive (Seminole Pow Wow). The auditorium, gymnasium and band facilities were built in later years. The school underwent a significant expansion in 1977 and an extensive remodeling in 1996. In the fall of 1973, the school used double sessions until the opening of Osceola High School in 1981.

== Athletics ==
Seminole High School athletic programs include baseball (boys), basketball, ten pin bowling, cheerleading, cross country, flag football (girls), football, golf, soccer, softball (girls), spring football, swimming, diving, tennis, track, volleyball, and wrestling.

=== Soccer ===
During 2003 season, the Seminole soccer team won the state championship.

=== Baseball ===
The Seminole Warhawk baseball team won the state title (Class 5A) in 2001.

=== Wrestling ===
The Seminole High School wrestling team won two state championships in the 1970s.

== The 4A Academy for the Arts ==
=== Orchestra ===
In 2006 The Seminole High School Orchestra played at Carnegie Hall. The Orchestra also played for the governor, and at the invitation-only event for Disney Honors.

=== Vocal ===
SHS has two choir Groups (Warhawk Singers, and the Seminole Singers).

=== Marching band ===
The Seminole High School Warhawk Marching Band has won the FMBC Florida State Class 4A Championships in 2018, 2012, 2011, 2006, and most recently They were 4A state champions in 2024 with a High Score of 91.8. They were the grand champions at the 2017 USBands Southern States Regional Championship in Chattanooga, Tennessee. They were the grand champions of the Virginia Beach National Marching Band Festival (1978). They have also marched in parades such as, The Seminole Christmas parade, The Pinellas Park Parade, and the Dr. Martin Luther King Parade, as well as the Tournament of Roses Parade in Pasadena, California (2005,2013 and 2025), Disney Christmas Parade (2007, 2024), and Macy's Thanksgiving Day Parade (2010).

=== Concert bands ===
The Wind Ensemble is the top level concert band. Membership is by audition. The Symphonic Band is the intermediate level concert band of the program, and is composed of students that have the ability to perform music at grade 3 or higher.

=== Jazz bands ===
The "All In" Big Band is the top jazz band at Seminole High, and has received superior ratings at State MPAs for multiple consecutive years. The "High Noon" Jazz Ensemble is the second jazz band, and is open to any students interested.

=== Drama and Musical Theatre Department ===
The Seminole High School Drama and Musical Theatre Department, also known as Troupe 3039 at competitions, usually put on at least one musical a year, and compete at the Florida Thespians District and State competitions every year.

== Notable alumni ==
- Clayton Andrews, former pitcher for the Toronto Blue Jays, Class of 1996
- Mike Bianco, head baseball coach for Ole Miss, Class of 1985
- Bruce G. Blowers, singer-songwriter, Class of 2005
- Jeff Darlington, ESPN contributor and sports writer for The Miami Herald, Class of 2000
- Ryan Fowler, former linebacker for the New York Jets, Dallas Cowboys, and Tennessee Titans, Class of 2000
- D'Qwell Jackson, former linebacker for the Cleveland Browns
- Nicole Johnson (Miss America), 1999 Miss America, Class of 1992
- Greg Jones, former relief pitcher for the Los Angeles Angels of Anaheim
- Casey Kotchman, former first baseman for the Miami Marlins
- Todd La Torre, lead singer of the rock band Queensrÿche, Class of 1992
- Brett Phillips, former outfielder for the Tampa Bay Rays, Class of 2012
- Mark Stock, artist, Class of 1970
- Scott Tucker, Olympic swimmer, Class of 1993
- Brandon Walton, NFL offensive tackle, Class of 2016
- Bobby Wilson, baseball coach and former baseball catcher
