= Bruce G. Blowers =

American Christian musician (born 1987)

- Born: May 15, 1987 (age 39)
- Origin: St. Petersburg, Florida, U.S.
- Genres: Acoustic pop, contemporary Christian
- Occupations: Singer, songwriter, classical composer
- Instruments: Piano, vocals, oboe, guitar
- Years active: 2000–present
- Label: Caravan Media
- Website: brucegblowers.com

Bruce Gregory Blowers (born May 15, 1987) is an American contemporary Christian music singer-songwriter from St. Petersburg, Florida. He is signed with Caravan Media, an independent record label based in Central Florida. He released his first full-length album,Through Glass, in 2009.

== Early life ==
Blowers wrote his first song titled "God Made Everything" at age 10; it was later performed by his local church choir.

== Career ==
Blowers has performed as a principal or second chair oboist with several ensembles, including the Keswick Christian School Band, the Pinellas Youth Symphony, the Tampa Bay Youth Orchestra, the Tampa Bay Symphony Orchestra, the orchestras at Seminole High School and the University of South Florida, and the St. Petersburg College Orchestra and Band. Blowers' original orchestral compositions have been played by members of the Tampa Bay Symphony and The Florida Orchestra. A symphony Blowers wrote won second place at the 34th Annual Composer's Guild competition. Blowers has also performed at Carnegie Hall with the National Festival Orchestra. He was a member of the "Musical Ambassadors Tour of Russia" during which the St. Petersburg College Madrigalians performed for audiences in Moscow, Saint Petersburg, and Orenburg Oblast.

=== Through Glass ===
Blowers recorded his first studio album, Through Glass, in late 2009 at Oh Good! Studios in DeLand. The album contains ten piano-driven tracks in the genre of contemporary Christian music. Blowers wrote, sang, and played piano for each track.

In an album review, St. Petersburg Times described the album as a "slickly produced collection of 10 catchy pop songs, with Blowers singing and playing piano with a soft-rock group." John Fleming, Performing Arts Critic for the Times, described Blowers as "a soulful singer-songwriter of Christian pop music." Singer-songwriter Matt Hires, a second cousin of Blowers, appeared at Blowers' album premiere concert in Seminole, Florida. Hires played lead guitar on "Distance", the second track from Through Glass. Blowers remastered "A Piece that Overcomes" in 2020, and then "Let Me In", "Bridge to You", and "Road to Feel" (formerly from "Your Road to Feel") in 2019.

== Discography ==
=== Studio albums ===
- Through Glass (2009)

==== Through Glass ====
Track listing

1. "Through Glass"
2. "Distance"
3. "Reverie"
4. "You"
5. "We Just Might Make It"
6. "Love Letter"
7. "Every Leaf"
8. "Singing at Night"
9. "Wings of the Wind"
10. "Atonement"
11. "Let me In"
12. "A Piece that Overcomes"
13. "Bridge to You"

== Acting credits ==
In addition to his music career, Blowers has appeared in commercials for Disney. He also portrayed the character of "Lance" in the television drama series, Walk on Water. Furthermore, he performed as a vocalist in musical and opera performances at the Palladium Theater in St. Petersburg, Florida.

== Tours ==
Blowers performs his music at churches and youth events throughout Central Florida. In concert, his sister, Brianne Grace Blowers, sometimes accompanies him on flute for the track "You." Brianne also contributed backup vocals on two of the album's tracks. Blowers has performed covers of Michael Bublé's song "Home." In early 2010, Blowers announced a summer tour of Greece. During the tour, he debuted his song "Your Road to Feel," written on guitar, at Bethel Lutheran Church in ⁣⁣Clearwater⁣⁣. Blowers has stated his intention to learn guitar for certain future tracks.
