= The Hedgehog Temple =

2023 art installation

- The Hedgehog Temple displayed at Burning Man 2023
- Artist: Members of Kurenivka
- Year: 2023
- Medium: Sculpture
- Dimensions: 7.0 m × 15 m (23 ft × 50 ft)

The Hedgehog Temple is a 2023 art installation created by members of Kurenivka, the official camp representing Ukraine at Burning Man. The installation was displayed at Burning Man 2023 in Nevada, United States. First conceived when Burning Man announced the 2023 theme, Animalia, the hedgehog is made out of 6,000 pounds (2,700 kg) of rusty metal, with over 100 Czech hedgehogs in the center. Attached to the installation were stories of people who died in the Russo-Ukrainian war beginning the previous year, along with any of their personal items, with the hedgehog serving as a memorial to them. The installation also helped raise funds to send evacuation vehicles and medical aid to people in Ukraine.

== Background ==
The Hedgehog Temple was created by members of Kurenivka, the official camp representing Ukraine at Burning Man. The installation was first conceived when Burning Man, a week long art festival, announced the festival's theme for 2023, Animalia. Yaroslav Korets, one of the artists, stated that Kurenivka wished to honor the Ukrainians who could not attend the festival because they died in the 2022 Russo-Ukrainian War. In.Labs Architects helped with creating the concept design and the final construction of the hedgehog. They had eight weeks to create the installation, visualizing it with Rhinoceros 3D. The sculpture was finished in Kyiv, and was sent to the United States to be displayed there. The hedgehog was assembled a week before the festival started.

== Description ==
The Hedgehog Temple, as the name suggests, is a hedgehog 23 feet (7.0 m) tall and 50 feet (15 m) long. The installation's frame is made of 6,000 pounds (2,700 kg) of rusty metal covered in a camouflage net. In the center, there were over 100 Czech hedgehogs created out of plywood painted to look like metal. People sent Kurenivka stories of their friends or relatives who died in the 2022 Russo-Ukrainian War, along with personal items like clothes or jewelry, which were attached to the installation. The installation was displayed at Burning Man 2023 in Nevada.

== Concept and themes ==
The installation served as a memorial to Ukrainians who died in the war. Czech hedgehogs were used because "it became one of the symbols of defense" in Ukraine. When the Russian invasion first started, 300,000 Czech hedgehogs were made to protect the homes of Ukrainians. The installation also represents the importance of community and support. Using the installation, Kurenivka partnered with the Leleka Foundation with a goal to raise funds to send evacuation vehicles and medical aid to the Ukrainian military.
