= Sonia Katyal =

American legal scholar

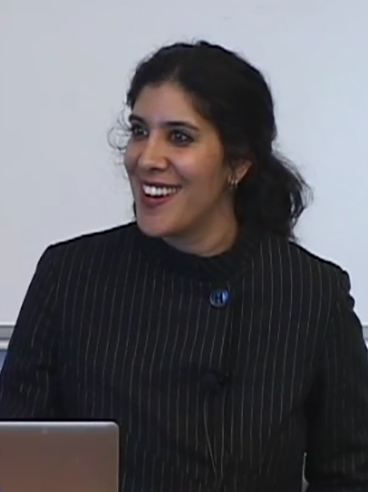
- Relatives: Neal Katyal (brother)

Academic background
- Education: Brown University; University of Chicago Law School

Sonia Katyal is an American legal scholar, professor, and associate dean of faculty development and research at UC Berkeley School of Law. Before joining Berkeley, Katyal was Joseph M. McLaughlin Professor of Law at Fordham University School of Law. Among other topics, her scholarship has focused on racism in consumer branding, the intersection of technology, intellectual property, and civil rights, as well as gender and sexual orientation.

Katyal received an A.B. from Brown University and a J.D. from University of Chicago Law School. After law school, Katyal was an associate at Covington & Burling.

Her brother, Neal Katyal, is also a lawyer and is former acting Solicitor General of the United States.

== Publications ==
- Peñalver, Eduardo M.; Katyal, Sonia (February 16, 2010). Property Outlaws: How Squatters, Pirates, and Protesters Improve the Law of Ownership. Yale University Press. ISBN 978-0-300-16123-6. OCLC 841171080.
