= Grace Livingston Hill =

American novelist (1865–1947)

Grace Hill
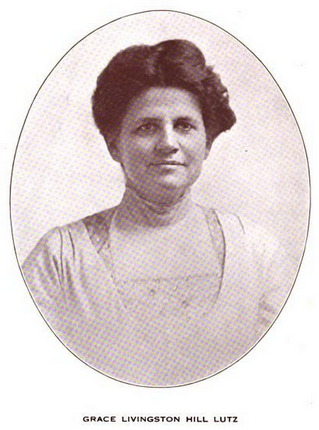
- Hill in 1915
- Born: April 16, 1865; Wellsville, NY
- Died: February 23, 1947 (aged 81)
- Occupation: Author
- Writing career
- Pen name: Marcia Macdonald
- Notable work: “The Witness”
- Website: gracelivingstonhill.com

Grace Livingston Hill (April 16, 1865 – February 23, 1947) was an early 20th-century novelist and wrote both under her real name and the pseudonym Marcia Macdonald. She wrote over 100 novels and numerous short stories. Her characters were most often young Christian women or become Christians within the confines of the story.

== Family ==
Grace Livingston Hill was born in Wellsville, New York to Marcia Macdonald Livingston and her husband, Presbyterian minister, Rev. Charles Montgomery Livingston. Both were writers, as was her aunt, Isabella Macdonald Alden, who wrote under the pseudonym "Pansy."

== Writing career ==
Hill's writing career began as a child in the 1870s, writing short stories for her aunt's weekly children's publication, The Pansy. Her first story printed in book form was The Esselstynes, which was published in 1877 as part of the "Mother's Boys and Girls Library" by D. Lothrop & Company.

A Chautauqua Idyl, her first book as a young adult, was written in 1887 to earn enough money for a family trip from her Florida home to the summer Chautauqua gathering at Chautauqua, New York. This illustrated allegory of a Chautauqua gathering held by the flowers, tree, and animals was published in time to be offered for sale that summer and brought enough earnings to take the family there. Several books written in collaboration with her family followed in the early 1890s, as well as her only children's book, A Little Servant.

In 1892, she married Rev T. G. F. Hill; he died in 1899.

She continued writing and publishing. Lack of funds was a frequent motivator, particularly after the death of her first husband left her with two small children and no income other than that from her writing. After the death of Hill's father less than a year later, her mother came to live with her. This prompted Hill to write more frequently. During and after her failed ten-year marriage to second husband Flavius Josephus Lutz, a church organist 15 years her junior, she continued to write to support her children and mother. She stopped using the Lutz surname after they parted ways in May 1914.

In 1930, she completed and edited her aunt Isabella’s autobiography, Memories of Yesterday.

Although many of her earlier novels were specifically intended to proselytize, Hill's publishers frequently removed overt references to religious themes. After her publishers realized the popularity of her books, references to religious topics were allowed to remain, although she later modified her writing style to appeal to a more secular audience. The last Grace Livingston Hill book, Mary Arden, was finished by her daughter, Ruth Hill Munce, writing under the name of Ruth Livingston Hill, and published in 1948.

Ruth went on to establish a Christian school in Florida and named it after her mother; it later became the Keswick Christian School.

== Themes ==
Hill's messages are simple in nature: good versus evil. As Hill believed the Bible was very clear about what was good and evil in life, she reflected that design in her own works. She wrote about a variety of different subjects, almost always with a romance worked into the message and often essential to the return to grace on the part of one or several characters.

If her clear-cut descriptions of evil in man and woman were Hill’s primary subjects in her novels, a secondary subject would always be God’s ability to restore. Hill aimed for a happy, or at least satisfactory, ending to any situation, often focusing on characters' new or renewed faith as impetus for resolution.

== Selected works ==
=== Miranda Trilogy ===
- Marcia Schuyler (1908)
- Phoebe Deane (1909)
- Miranda (1915)

=== Other novels ===
- A Daily Rate (1900)
- An Unwilling Guest (1902)
- The Mystery of Mary (1910)
- Aunt Crete's Emancipation (1911)
- Dawn of the Morning (1911)
- Lo, Michael! (1913)
- The Best Man (1914)
- The Man of the Desert (1914)
- A Voice in the Wilderness (1916)
- The Finding of Jasper Holt (1916)
- The Obsession of Victoria Gracen (1916)
- The Enchanted Barn (1917)
- Exit Betty (1919)
- The Search (1919)
- Cloudy Jewel (1920)
- The Tryst (1921)
- The City of Fire (1922)
- The Girl from Montana (1922)
- Tomorrow About This Time (1923)
- The Honor Girl (1927)
- Crimson Roses (1928)
- Duskin (1929)
- The Prodigal Girl (1929)
- The Gold Shoe (1930)
- Silver Wings (1931)
- Happiness Hill (1932)
- The Beloved Stranger (1933)
- Matched Pearls (1933)
- Amorelle (1934)
- Christmas Bride (1934)
- Rainbow Cottage (1934)
- White Orchids (1935)
- Beauty for Ashes (1935)
- The Strange Proposal (1935)
- April Gold (1936)
- The Substitute Guest (1936)
- Brentwood (1937)
- Homing (1938)
- Maris (1938)
- Patricia (1939)
- Stranger Within the Gates (1939)
- Head of the House (1940)
- The Girl of the Woods (1942)
- Spice Box (1943)
- More than Conqueror (1944)
- A Girl to Come Home To (1945)
- All Through the Night (1945)
- Bright Arrows (1946)
- Where Two Ways Met (1946)

== Sources ==
- Munce, Robert; Grace Livingston Hill: a Biography
- About Grace Livingston Hill at Christianbook.com
- Books by Grace Livingston Hill at Tomfolio.com
