= Burning Man 2023 =

Experimental event in Nevada, U.S.

- Date: August 27–September 4, 2023
- Locations: Black Rock Desert; Pershing County, Nevada, U.S.
- Attendance: 73,000
- Website: burningman.org

Location of Burning Man 2023

Burning Man 2023 was a week-long gathering in the Black Rock Desert in Pershing County, Nevada. The 35th Burning Man event, it took place from August 27 to September 4, 2023. An estimated 73,000 people attended the event.

Torrential weather severely affected the event near its conclusion, leaving attendees stranded as some began an exodus. One fatality was reported.

== Background ==
Burning Man is a week-long gathering of art, community, self-expression, and self-reliance held in the Black Rock Desert in Pershing County, Nevada. The event lies on Lake Lahontan, a large lake that desiccated due to Pleistocene climate change, leaving a dry lake, or playa, in the northwestern Nevada region. Burning Man attracts tens of thousands of attendees, including artists, musicians, and activists. The event is guided by self-sufficiency; most attendees must bring their own food, water, and supplies in an event similar to wilderness camping with performances. Burning Man features an eponymous burning of a large, wooden effigy known as the "Man". Attendees, known as "Burners", create a civilization known as Black Rock City comprising villages, a medical center, and an airport. To enter Burning Man, participants must either use the airport or a section of Nevada State Route 447.

== Event ==
The theme of Burning Man 2023 was "Animalia", celebrating the "animal world and our place in it". Organizers closed Burning Man's gates before the event due to Hurricane Hilary. The beginning of the event was disrupted when protesters blocked the highway to the Black Rock Desert asking for organizers to ban private planes, single-use plastics, and limit its power usage. Four people were arrested. A box representing war-torn Ukraine entitled "Phoenix" was burned at the event, the work of fabricators in Kyiv and Chicago. Before its burning, the box played audio of explosions and air raid sirens as an opera singer performed a Ukrainian song. The Hedgehog Temple was also displayed at the event. It was a 23 feet (7.0 m) hedgehog with over 100 Czech hedgehogs in its center. An estimated 73,000 people attended the event at a cost of US$575 per person for a regular ticket.

Among celebrities who attended the event were Diplo, Chris Rock, Kelly Gale, and Joel Kinnaman.

== Rainfall and exodus ==
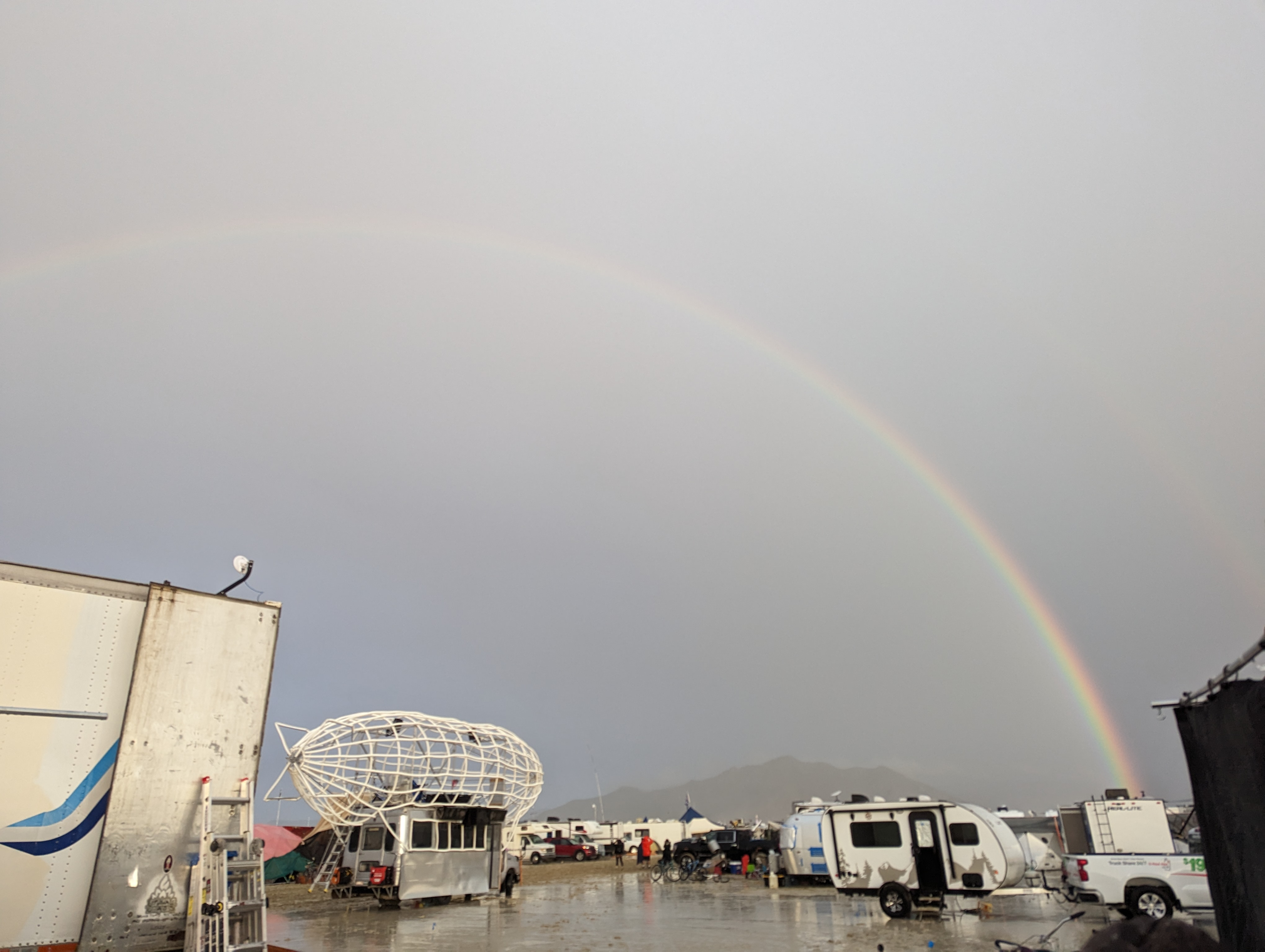
Rainfall on September 2

On September 1, heavy rainfall hit Nevada. The National Weather Service issued a flash flood warning through September 4. Burning Man advised attendees that they should shelter in place and closed the front entrance. Between .5 inches (13 mm) and 1 inch (25 mm) of rain fell on September 1. Despite organizers stating that the gate and airport in Black Rock City were closed, authorities said participants were free to leave. The Bureau of Land Management urged attendees heading to the event to turn around. Organizers suggested that participants should walk to Gerlach, although most hotel rooms in Gerlach were already fully booked. They ended up discouraging attendees from walking in the dark and provided buses to Reno from there. Heather Richards, a National Weather Service meteorologist in Reno, told the Los Angeles Times that playa mud is "so thick that you'll sink right into it and be stuck there for a while". Event officials released a "Wet Playa Survival Guide" to help attendees deal with the conditions.

The Nevada Department of Transportation closed travel lanes on Route 447. According to Pershing County sheriff Jerry Allen, some vehicles have caused damage to the playa. Allen urged attendees to avoid driving out of the event. The Burning Man Organization pledged to open up internet access and deploy mobile cell trailers. The burning of the Man was delayed and one person died. Disc jockey Diplo and comedian Chris Rock attended the event and walked six miles (10 km) through mud before catching a ride in a pickup truck; Diplo had a scheduled performance in Washington DC the next day and arrived in time. Former acting solicitor general Neal Katyal took a six-mile (10 km) hike, describing the journey as "harrowing". Some attendees remained defiant to the pluvial weather conditions.

The roads were re-opened on September 4. On that same night, the effigy was burned, two days behind its original schedule. The five-mile-long dirt road leading to the nearest highway took over five hours to exit due to the amount of traffic, which had formed into ten lanes. Many vehicles were marooned.

== Reactions ==
Writing for Vox, Adam Clark Estes criticized Burning Man 2023 for harming the environment. Several individuals compared the event to Fyre Festival, which was also marred by rainfall. Adriana Roberts, DJ, performer, and editor of the Black Rock City newspaper Piss Clear (later BRC Weekly), argued that media coverage of the flooding had been greatly exaggerated and that the event was not comparable to Fyre Festival, while acknowledging that sanitation problems were real.

President Joe Biden was briefed on the weather conditions at the event, which is held on property managed by the federal Bureau of Land Management.

== Arrests and fatality ==
There were 13 arrests at Burning Man 2023 and one confirmed death due to acute cocaine, ethanol, and MDMA toxicity.

== Hoaxes ==
Pershing County's Sheriff's office reported receiving multiple false reports of a shooting and riot at the event, some from overseas phone numbers. After investigations, a sheriff's representative local media, “We don’t have any emergency concerns out there right now... People are calm and doing OK.”

Social media posts claimed there was an ebola outbreak at the 2023 event during the flooding event, but this was also a hoax. Brace Belden, the host of left-wing podcast TrueAnon, later claimed responsibility for starting the rumours with a series of tweets.
