= Dan Lothian =

American journalist

Dan Lothian is the Editor-in-Chief and General Manager of Local News for GBH in Boston, MA. He is a former White House Correspondent at CNN and former media entrepreneur.

Lothian was CNN's Boston Bureau Chief. He traveled across New England and around the country for CNN covering politics and other major news events. He has also been on assignment in CNN's Jerusalem and Cairo bureaus.

The award-winning correspondent was part of CNN's election coverage in 2004 and 2008, both on the campaign trail and reporting on key caucuses and primaries. In 2003 he did extensive reports on the California recall election that led to Governor Arnold Schwarzenegger's victory.

Some of the other major events that he has covered while Boston Bureau Chief with CNN included the Isabella Stewart Gardner Museum art heist mystery, the funeral of Rosa Parks, Hurricane Katrina and the 50th anniversary of the US Supreme Court's historic decision in Brown v. Board of Education case.

Prior to joining CNN, Lothian worked for NBC News based in the network's Los Angeles bureau. He covered breaking news stories in the U.S. and overseas for Nightly News, the Today Show and MSNBC.

Lothian has also worked at WDEF in Chattanooga, TN, WPTV in West Palm Beach, FL, KING-TV in Seattle, WA, and WCVB in Boston, MA. Prior to his television career Lothian worked at several radio stations in Florida and Tennessee. He began broadcasting at the age of 16.

Lothian was born in Evanston, Illinois and raised in Puerto Rico, Jamaica, and Florida. In 1982, he graduated from Keswick Christian School in St. Petersburg, Florida. Lothian then earned a bachelor's degree from Tennessee Temple University and a master's degree from American University in Washington, D.C.
