= Jeffrey Rosen (legal academic) =

American academic and commentator on legal affairs

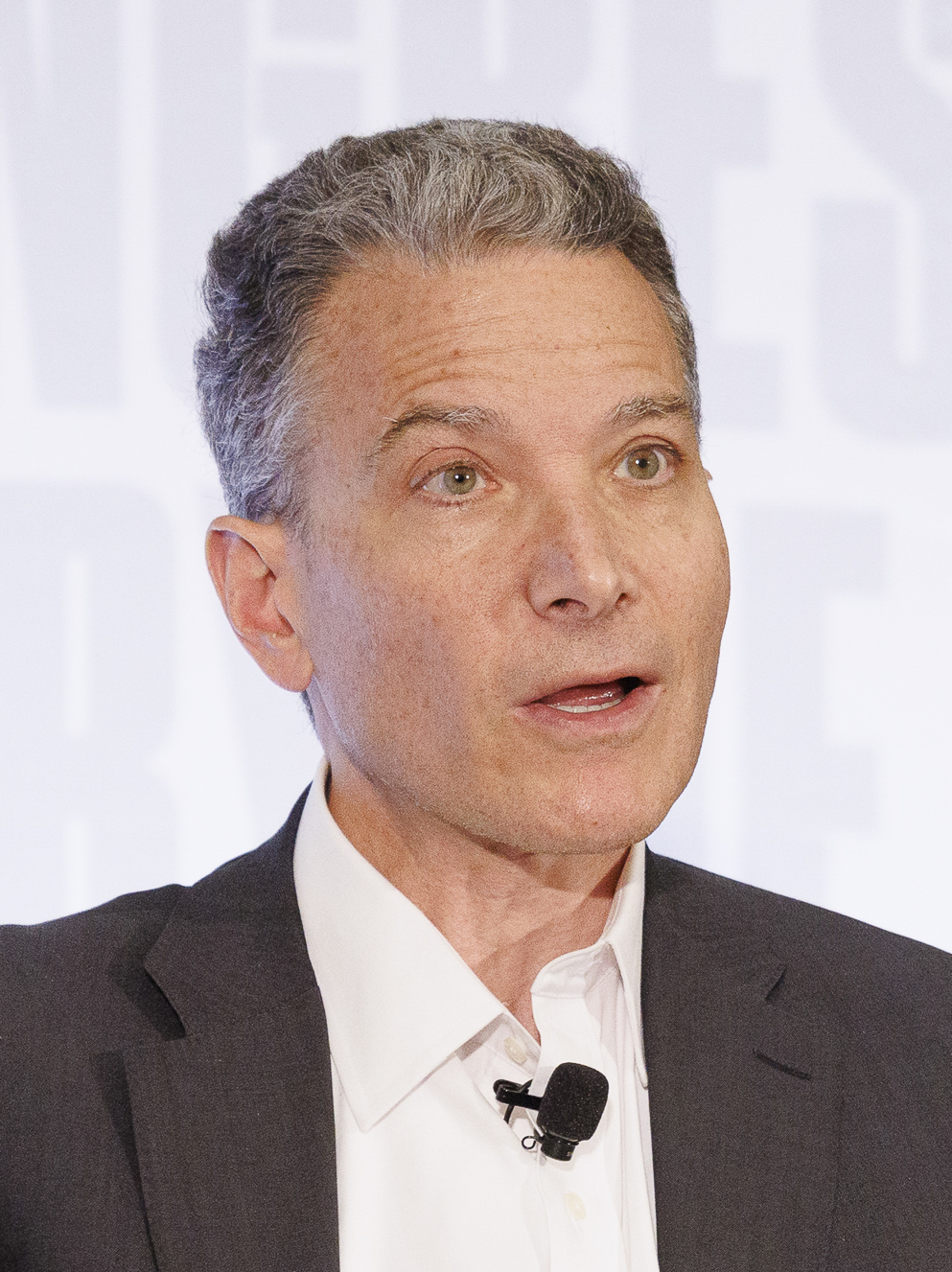
- Rosen in 2024

President and CEO of the National Constitution Center
- In office May 6, 2013 – January 9, 2026
- Preceded by: Vince Stango (acting)
- Succeeded by: Vince Stango (interim)

Personal details
- Born: February 13, 1964 (age 62)
- Education: Harvard University (BA); Balliol College, Oxford (BA); Yale University (JD)

Jeffrey Rosen (born February 13, 1964) is an American legal scholar, journalist, and author.

Rosen is a law professor at The George Washington University, a senior fellow at the Foundation for Individual Rights and Expression (FIRE) and the author of nine books, including New York Times bestsellers. He served as the president and CEO of the National Constitution Center from 2013 to 2026, where he is now CEO Emeritus. Rosen is a contributing writer for The Atlantic. He was a longtime legal affairs editor of The New Republic and was a staff writer for The New Yorker. He was also a writer for The New York Times Magazine and many other outlets.

In 2024, Rosen was named a Chevalier of the Ordre des Arts et des Lettres (Order of Arts and Letters) of France. In 2025, he was elected to the American Philosophical Society.

== Education ==
Rosen attended the Dalton School, a private college preparatory school on New York City's Upper East Side, and graduated in 1982 as valedictorian. He then studied English literature and government at Harvard University, graduating in 1986 with a Bachelor of Arts, summa cum laude. He was subsequently a Marshall Scholar at Balliol College, Oxford, in philosophy, politics, and economics, from which he received a second bachelor's degree in 1988. He then attended the Yale Law School, where he served as a senior editor of the Yale Law Journal and graduated with a Juris Doctor in 1991.

== Career ==
After graduating from law school, Rosen served as law clerk to Chief Judge Abner Mikva of the United States Court of Appeals for the District of Columbia Circuit.

Rosen was the commentator on legal affairs for The New Republic from 1992 to 2014. He then joined The Atlantic, as a contributing editor. He was a staff writer at The New Yorker, and he is a frequent contributor to The New York Times Magazine.

Rosen is a professor of law at the Law School of George Washington University in Washington, D.C.

== Journalism ==
Rosen has written frequently about the U.S. Supreme Court. He has interviewed Chief Justice John Roberts, Justice John Paul Stevens, Justice Stephen Breyer, Justice Elena Kagan, Justice Ruth Bader Ginsburg, Justice Neil Gorsuch, Justice Amy Coney Barrett and Justice Anthony Kennedy. Justice Ginsburg credited his early support for her Supreme Court candidacy as a factor in her nomination. "...she sent me a generous note, fanning my hopes of becoming a judicial Boswell. (You planted the idea, she wrote, I'll try hard to develop it.)" In 2009, when Sonia Sotomayor was a leading candidate for a nomination to the Supreme Court, Rosen wrote "The Case Against Sotomayor," a lengthy blog post on The New Republic's website. The article cited former law clerks and colleagues of Sotomayor who anonymously criticized her temperament and legal writing. Conservative pundits cited Rosen's article to disparage Sotomayor's intelligence and legal qualifications, while liberals criticized Rosen's post as "reckless" and sexist. In response, Rosen condemned the conservative "misrepresentation" of his article, stated that he did not choose or approve of the article's headline, and defended his questioning of Sotomayor's suitability. In an opinion piece published after Kagan's nomination hearings and before the Senate's vote on her confirmation, Rosen encouraged Kagan to look to the late Justice Louis Brandeis as a model "to develop a positive vision of progressive jurisprudence in an age of economic crisis, financial power and technological change."

In 2006, the legal historian David Garrow called him "the nation's most widely read and influential legal commentator."

== National Constitution Center ==
Congress chartered the Constitution Center "to disseminate information about the U.S. Constitution on a non-partisan basis." Rosen became president of the National Constitution Center in 2013.

During Rosen's tenure, with a $5.5 million grant from the Templeton Foundation, the NCC formed the Coalition of Freedom Advisory Board, chaired by the heads of the conservative Federalist Society and liberal American Constitution Society, to oversee the creation of the "Interactive Constitution", which the College Board has made a centerpiece of the new AP history and government exams. The Interactive Constitution project commissions scholars to write about every clause of the Constitution, discussing areas of agreement and disagreement between left and right. It also allows users to explore the historic sources of the Bill of Rights and compare America's protected liberties to other constitutional systems throughout the world. The Interactive Constitution received nearly five million unique visitors in its first year online.

Rosen moderated the weekly podcast "We the People" for the National Constitution Center, convening liberal and conservative scholars to discuss timely constitutional issues as well as constitutional debates. In 2014, the Constitution Center opened the George H. W. Bush Bill of Rights gallery, displaying rare copies of the Constitution, the Declaration of Independence, and one of the twelve original copies of the Bill of Rights. In 2015, the Center opened a constitution drafting lab, supported by Google, that convenes constitution-drafters and students from around the world for constitution drafting exercises.

Rosen served as president and CEO of the NCC for over twelve years, the longest tenure of any NCC President and CEO. He came to the Center at a time when it was struggling to find its identity as a Philadelphia-based history museum and worked with the NCC staff to transform it into a national platform for nonpartisan constitutional education. “My goal was to create an American institution that convenes people of different perspectives for civil dialogue and debate and inspires people to learn about our Founding ideals,” Rosen wrote in a statement in January 2026. During Rosen's tenure, the Center launched innovative web-based learning tools, including the Interactive Constitution, which by 2026 received more than 11 million unique visitors, the Interactive Declaration, the We the People podcast series, the Founders’ Library, the Constitution 101 course, a collaboration with Khan Academy, and a podcast series with Ken Burns, Pursuit: The Founders Guide to Happiness. Rosen also oversaw the development of several new museum exhibits, including galleries about America's Founding Principles, the First Amendment, the Civil War and Reconstruction, and the 19th Amendment. He helped to secure funding to bring the 50-ton marble First Amendment Tablet from the Newseum in Washington, D.C. to be installed at the NCC. During Rosen's tenure, the NCC received a $15 million gift from Ken Griffith, the largest single gift donation in the Center's history. The Center was transformed financially, with record gifts, totaling more than $150M secured under Rosen's tenure, enabling the growth of the Center's annual budget by 71% since the start of his leadership. Also under Rosen's leadership, U.S. Supreme Court Justices Neil Gorsuch and Stephen Breyer joined the Center as co-chairs.

=== Departure ===
A management dispute emerged in fall 2025 between Rosen and Vince Stango, the Center's then executive vice president and chief operating officer. Doug DeVos and Mike George, the former and current chairmen of the board of trustees, independently hired an employment lawyer from the law firm of the General Counsel to the Board, who also serves as Trustee on the Board, to investigate and perform a culture check. They pushed for Rosen to serve as CEO and give the presidency title to Stango. The negotiations faltered in December as details of the actual restructuring plan became known to Board members who had not previously been informed and who had not previously voted on the leadership changes. Rosen submitted a resignation letter conditioned on the acceptance of the full board of trustees, asking that the full board consider the facts and also allow him to speak to respond. Chairman Mike George declined to let Rosen speak with the Board. Board member J. Michael Luttig, a backer of Rosen, threatened a lawsuit against the leaders of the board over what he saw as the violation of Rosen's due process rights. Rosen's conditional resignation was ultimately accepted after an hours-long, contentious board meeting. The leadership change was announced publicly on January 9, 2026, and Rosen transitioned to the role of CEO Emeritus.

== Personal life ==
Rosen, the son of Estelle and Sidney Rosen, is married to Lauren Coyle Rosen, a cultural anthropologist, author, singer-composer, artist, and lawyer, who was a cultural anthropology professor at Princeton University and is a fellow at Harvard University. She is the Founder of Divine Feminine Living and host of The Divine Feminine Podcast Previously, he was married to Christine Rosen (formerly Stolba), a historian. Rosen is the brother of Joanna Rosen, a medical doctor, and the brother-in-law of Neal Katyal, former Acting Solicitor General of the United States.

== Selected works ==
- The Pursuit of Liberty: How Hamilton vs. Jefferson Ignited the Lasting Battle Over Power in America, New York: Simon & Schuster, 2025. ISBN 978-1668053744
- The Pursuit of Happiness: How Classical Writers on Virtue Inspired the Lives of the Founders and Defined America, New York: Simon & Schuster, 2024. ISBN 9781668002476
- Conversations with RBG: Ruth Bader Ginsburg on Life, Love, Liberty, and Law, New York: Henry Holt, 2019. ISBN 9781250235169
- William Howard Taft: The American Presidents Series: The 27th President, 1909-1913, New York: Times Books, 2018. ISBN 9780805069549
- Louis D. Brandeis: American Prophet, New Haven: Yale University Press, 2016. ISBN 030015867X.
- Constitution 3.0: Freedom and Technological Change, co-editor, Benjamin Wittes, Washington, D.C.: Brookings Press, 2013. ISBN 0815724500
- The Supreme Court: The Personalities and Rivalries that Defined America, New York: Times Books, 2007. ISBN 0-8050-8182-8
- The Most Democratic Branch: How the Courts Serve America, New York: Oxford University Press, 2006. ISBN 0-19-517443-7
- The Naked Crowd: Reclaiming Security and Freedom in an Anxious Age. New York: Random House. 2004. ISBN 0-375-75985-9.
- The Unwanted Gaze: The Destruction of Privacy in America, New York: Random House, 2000. ISBN 0-679-44546-3
