= Lake Seminole Park =

Park in Pinellas County, Florida, US

- Interactive map of Lake Seminole Park
- Type: Municipal
- Location: Seminole, Florida
- Coordinates: 27.83951°N 82.77413°W
- Area: 258 acres (104 ha)
- Operator: Pinellas County
- Open: Everyday from dawn to 17:30
- Status: Open year-round

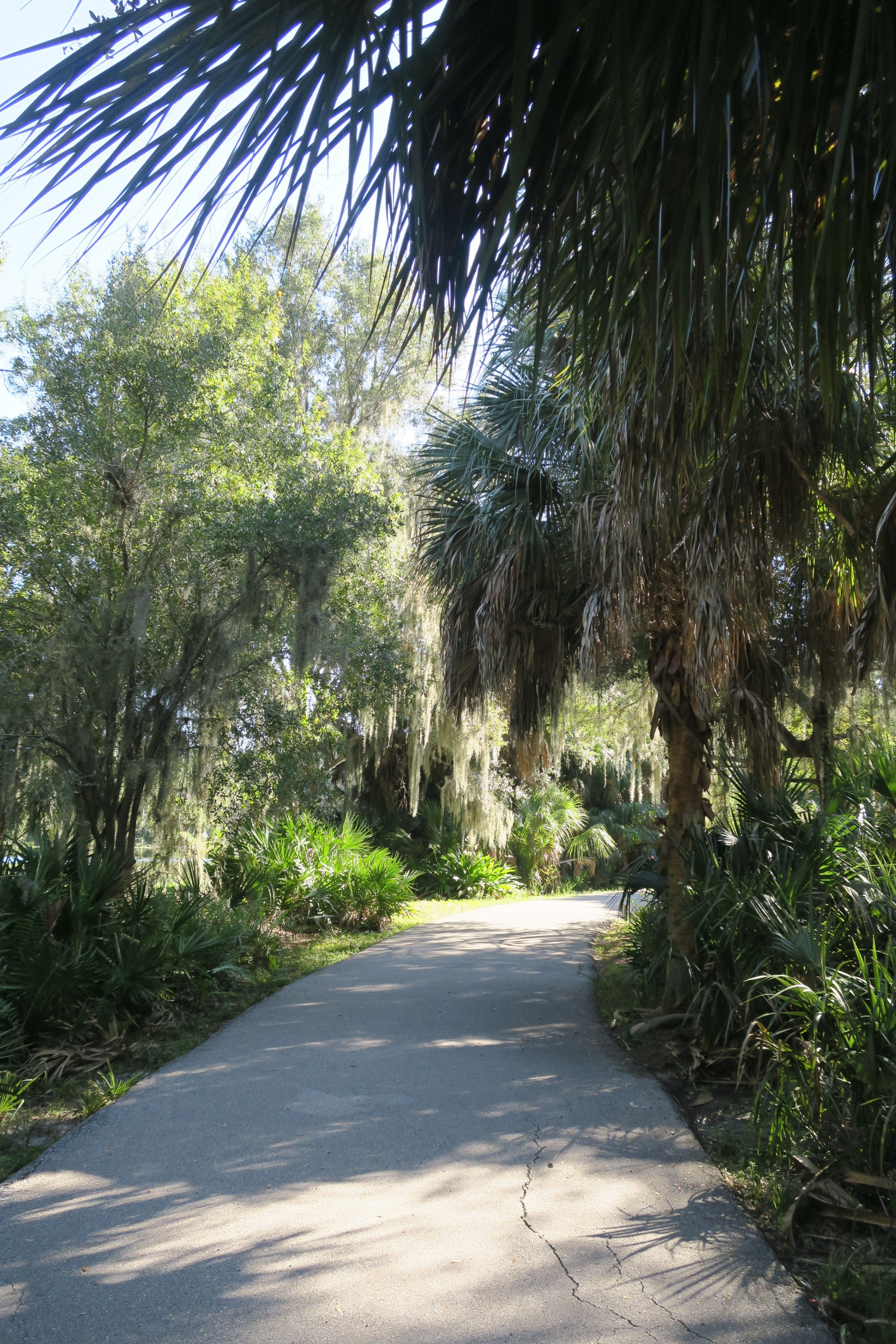
A typical walkway in the park for visitors

Lake Seminole Park is a 258-acre municipal park located on the shores of Lake Seminole in Pinellas County, Florida, and serves as a designated wildlife sanctuary. It is home to biking and walking trails, which include a main two-mile-long paved trail, with a 1-mile cutoff option. There are multiple small paths that are about half a mile long that go around a pond and a playground.

== Wildlife ==
The park's wildlife consists of alligators, bald eagles, black vultures, roseate spoonbills, osprey, tiger swallowtail, pickerelweed, river otters, and green tree frogs.

== Amenities ==
Lake Seminole Park offers 13 picnic shelters that can be reserved online, a ball field and two playgrounds. Since there is a boat ramp people are able to go fishing in the lakes. The most important fishing species in the lakes are bass, crappie, bream, shellcraker, catfish, gar, and carp.

There is a recycling collection unit in the park, which is location 29, in Pinellas County.

The park is also designed for people with wheelchairs, by making the park wheelchair accessible.

== Gallery ==
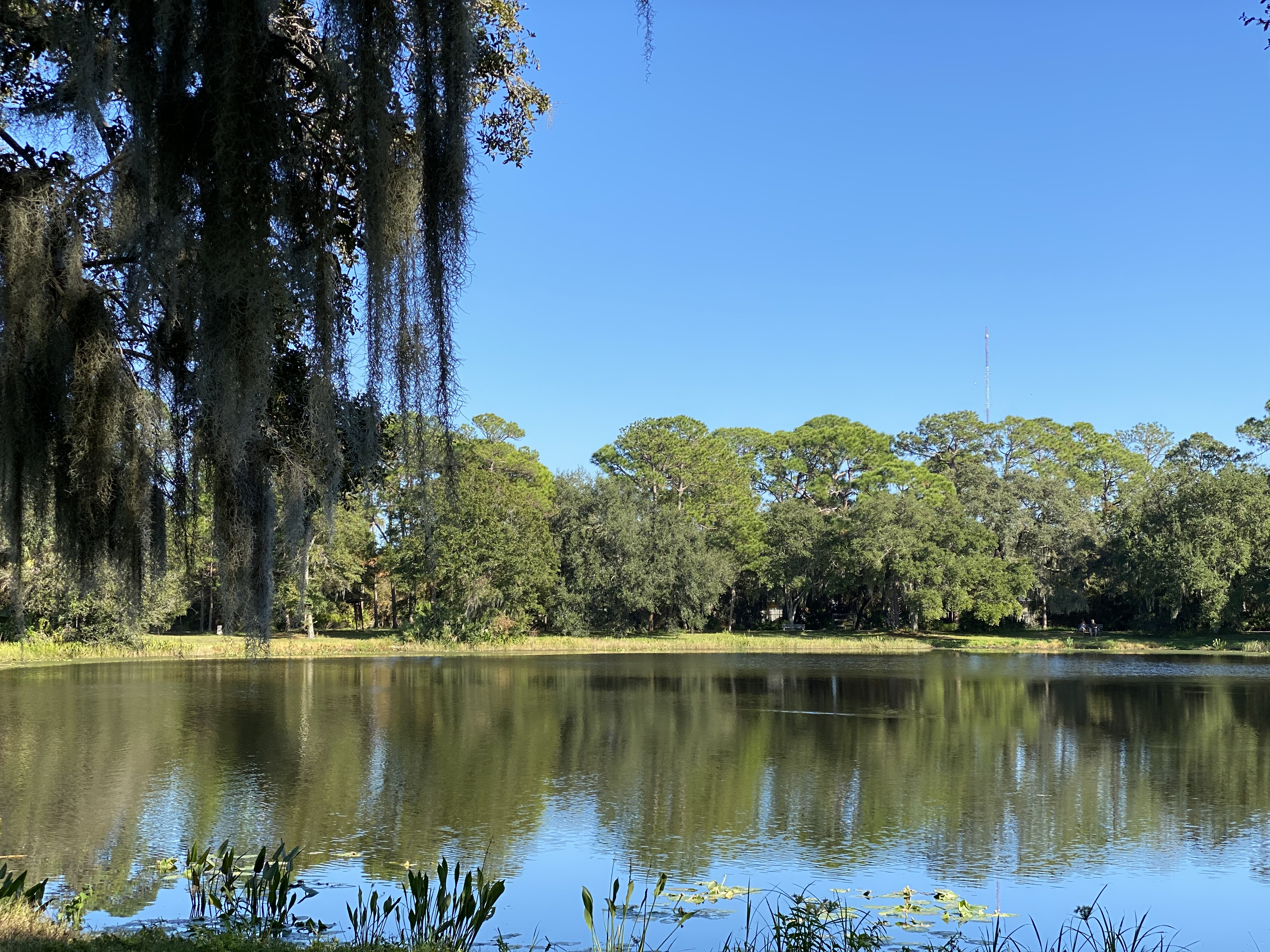
A lake that can be seen from the trail

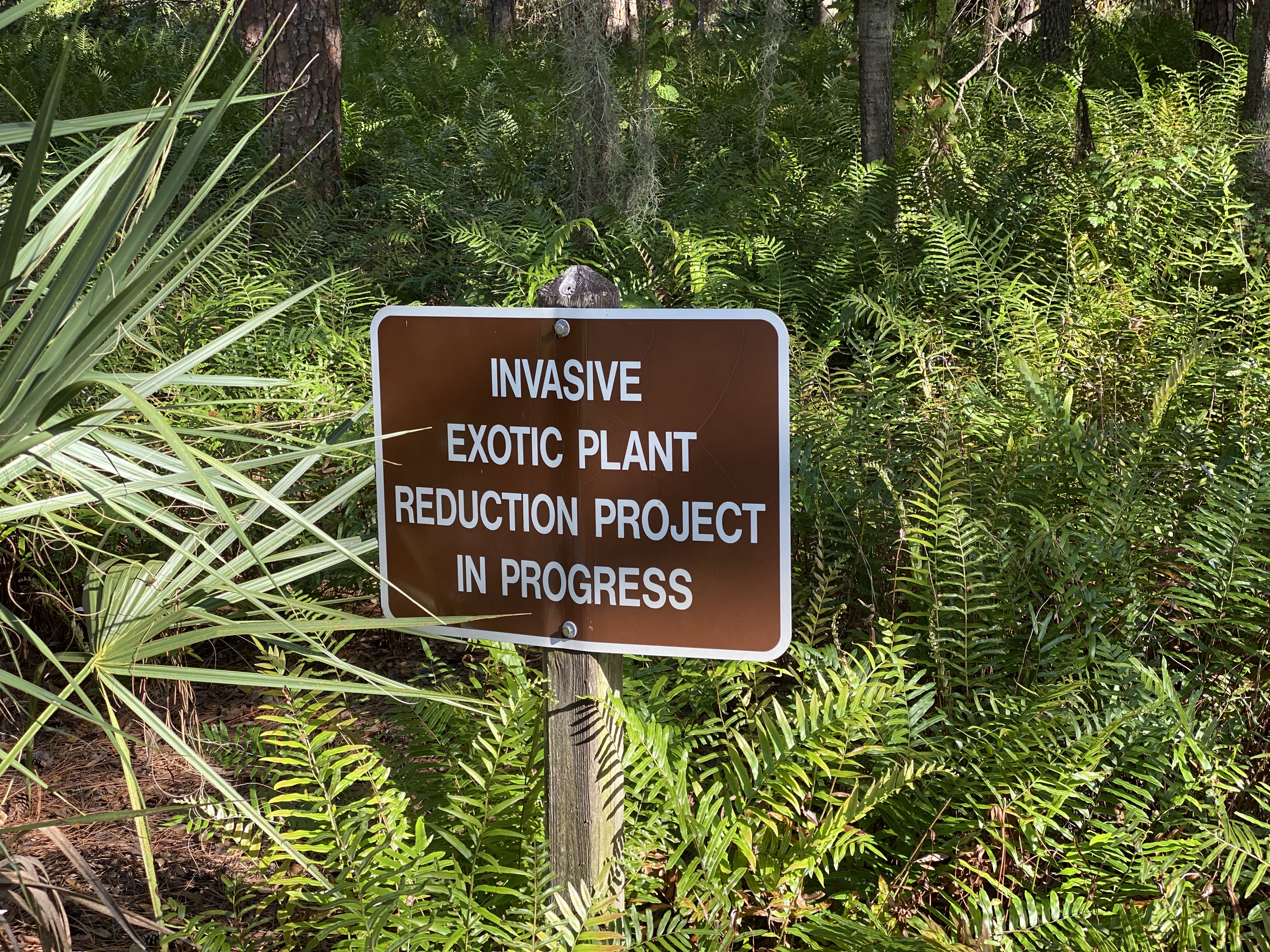
Invasive plant reduction in progress sign at Lake Seminole Park

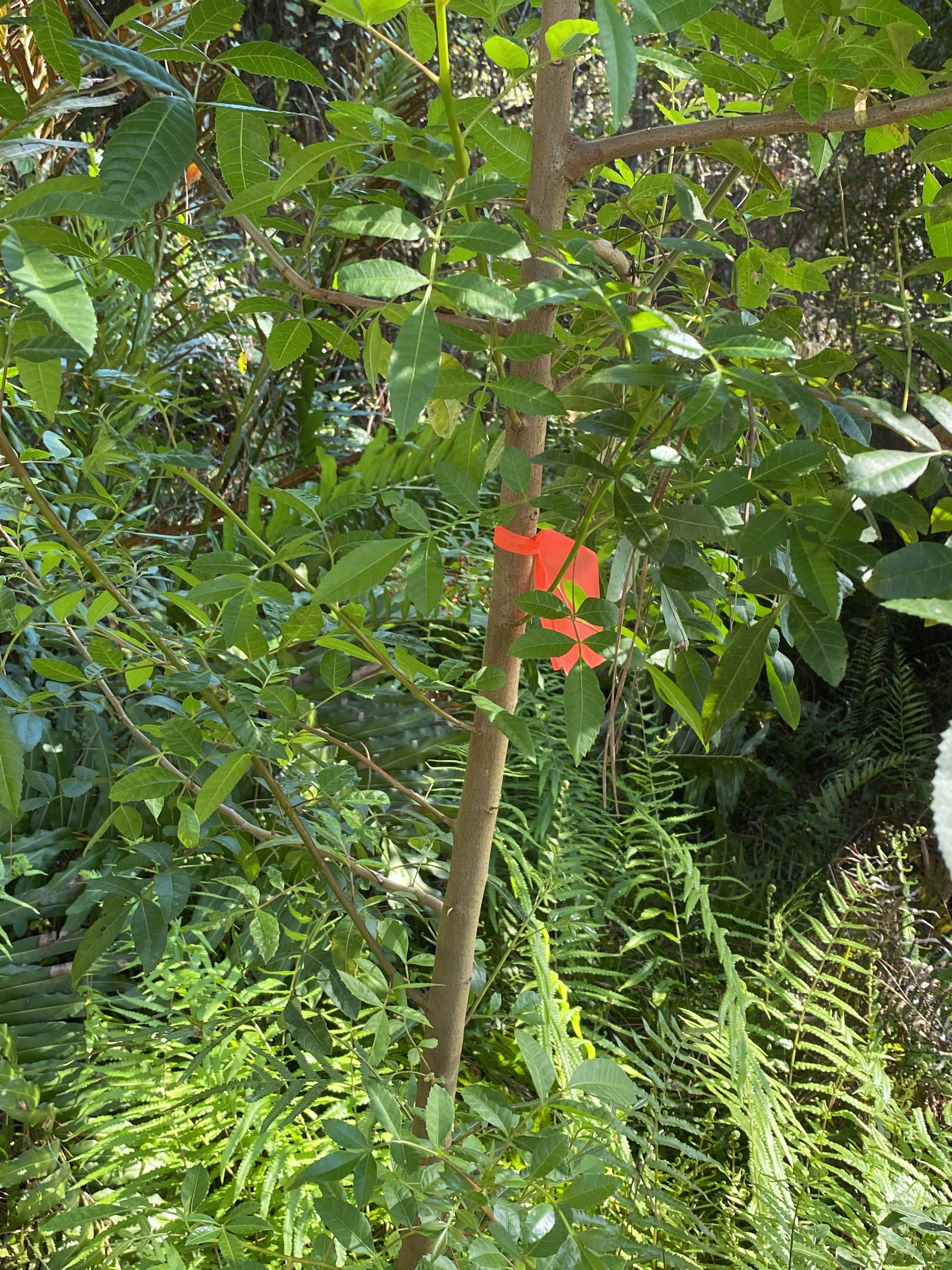
Invasive tree marked for removal
