= Christine Rosen =

American writer (born 1973)

- Born: Christine Allison Stolba; July 1973 (age 52–53)
- Education: University of South Florida (BA); Emory University (PhD)
- Occupations: Historian; writer
- Spouse: Jeffrey Rosen (m. 2003, div.)

Christine Allison Rosen (born July 1973) is an American historian and author. She is a senior fellow at the American Enterprise Institute, a conservative think tank, and a columnist and podcaster for Commentary.

== Early life and education ==
Born Christine Allison Stolba, she was raised in a fundamentalist Christian family, which she later discussed in her 2005 memoir, My Fundamentalist Education: A Memoir of a Divine Girlhood.

Rosen attended college at the University of South Florida, where she graduated summa cum laude with a B.A. in 1993. She then received a Ph.D. in history from Emory University in 1999.

== Career ==
She collaborated with Diana Furchtgott-Roth on two books, Women's Figures: an illustrated guide to the economic progress of women in America (1999) and The Feminist Dilemma: when success is not enough (2001).

From 1999 to 2002, she worked at the Independent Women's Forum. While there, she published a short study Lying in a Room of One's Own: how women's studies textbooks miseducate students in 2002.

Her book Preaching Eugenics: Religious Leaders and the American Eugenics Movement was published in 2004.

Rosen's book The Extinction of Experience was published in the United States in 2024 and in the United Kingdom in 2025.

== Personal life ==
In 2003, she married law professor and author Jeffrey Rosen. The ceremony was performed by Supreme Court Justice Ruth Bader Ginsburg. The couple later divorced.

== Books ==
- Furchtgott-Roth, Diana; Stolba, Christine (1999). Women's figures: an illustrated guide to the economic progress of women in America. Washington, DC: AEI Press. ISBN 978-0844741147.
- Furchtgott-Roth, Diana; ——— (2001). The feminist dilemma: when success is not enough. Washington, D.C: AEI Press. ISBN 978-0844741291.
- ——— (2002). Lying in a room of one's own: how women's studies textbooks miseducate students. Arlington, VA: Independent Women's Forum. OCLC 49845318.
- ——— (2004). Preaching eugenics: religious leaders and the American eugenics movement. Oxford: Oxford University Press. ISBN 978-0195156799.
- ——— (2005). My fundamentalist education: a memoir of a divine girlhood (1st ed.). New York: PublicAffairs. ISBN 978-1586482589.
- Riley, Naomi Schaefer; ———, eds. (2011). Acculturated. West Conshohocken, PA: Templeton Press. ISBN 9781283260657.
- ——— (2024). The extinction of experience: being human in a disembodied world (First ed.). New York, NY: W.W. Norton & Company. ISBN 9780393241716.
- ——— (2025). The extinction of experience: reclaiming our humanity in a digital world. London: The Bodley Head. ISBN 9781847922083.
