= Felix Emanuel Schelling =

American academic (1858–1945)

- Born: September 3, 1858
- Died: December 15, 1945 (aged 87)

Academic background
- Education: University of Pennsylvania

Felix Emanuel Schelling (September 3, 1858, in New Albany, Indiana – December 15, 1945) was an American educator.

== Biography ==
In 1881 he graduated from the University of Pennsylvania, where he received the degree of LL.B. in 1883 and that of A.M. in 1884, and of Litt.D. in 1903 and LL.D. in 1909. Beginning in 1893 he was John Welsh Centennial professor of English literature at the University of Pennsylvania. Schelling was a member of the National Institute of Arts and Letters, of the American Philosophical Society and of the Modern Language Association of America.

== Publications ==
- Literary and Verse Criticism of the Reign of Elizabeth (1891)
- Life and Works of George Gascoigne (1893)
- A Book of Elizabethan Lyrics (1896)
- A Book of 17th Century Lyrics (1899)
- The English Chronicle Play (1902)
- The Queen's Progress and Other Elizabethan Sketches (1904)
- Elizabethan Drama 1558-1642 (2 vols) (1908)
- English Literature during the Lifetime of Shakespeare (1910)
- The Restoration Drama (Cambridge History of Literature, 1912)
- The English Lyric (1913)
- A History of English Drama (1914)
- Shakespeare and "Demi-Science": Papers on Elizabethan Topics (1927)

He edited:

- Ben Jonson, Discoveries (1892)
- Eastward Ho and the Alchemist (1903)
- The Merchant of Venice (1903)
- Macbeth (1910)
- Beaumont and Fletcher (1912)
