= Lauren Coyle Rosen =

American cultural anthropologist (born 1983)

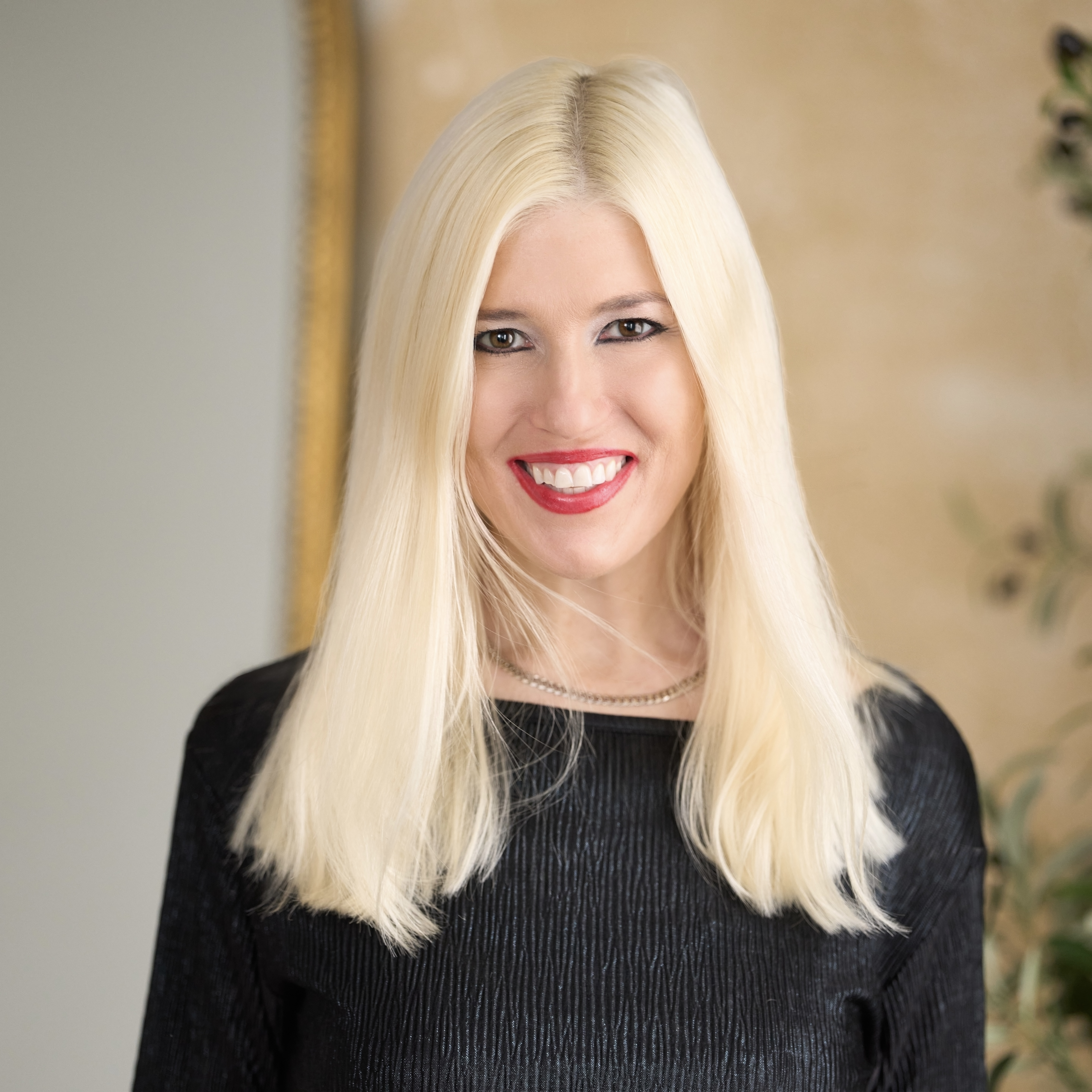
- Born: Lauren Nicole Coyle; January 12, 1983 (age 43); Cincinnati, Ohio
- Education: Ohio University (BA); Harvard Law School (JD); University of Chicago (PhD)
- Notable work: Goddess: A History · Fires of Gold · Law in Light · Hannibal Lokumbe: Spiritual Soundscapes · Veils of Athena · Purify Flame Dreamscape · The Spirit of Ani · Covers and Veils in Blue
- Spouse: Jeffrey Rosen (m. 2017)
- Awards: American Philosophical Society · U.S. Environmental Protection Agency · Social Science Research Council · American Council of Learned Societies · Andrew W. Mellon Foundation · Princeton President’s Award for Distinguished Teaching · Pulitzer Prize (nominated) · National Book Award (nominated) · National Book Critics Circle Award (nominated)
- Scientific career
- Fields: Cultural anthropology · Legal anthropology · Anthropology of religion · Art · Music · Cultural studies · Social theory
- Workplaces: Princeton University · Harvard University · University of Chicago
- Website: laurencoylerosen.com

Lauren Coyle Rosen (born January 12, 1983) is an American cultural anthropologist, author, and singer-songwriter. She is known for her research and writing on culture, art, law, and comparative spirituality, as well as for her music. She is the founder of Divine Feminine Living and host of The Divine Feminine Podcast.

== Early life and education ==
Coyle Rosen was born on January 12, 1983, in Cincinnati, Ohio. She was born as Lauren Nicole Coyle, to Terry Coyle, an executive director of Franklin Area Community Services, and Thomas M. Coyle, a pharmacist. After graduating from Ohio University, she obtained a JD from Harvard Law School and a PhD in cultural anthropology from the University of Chicago.

== Career ==
Coyle Rosen began her career as an academic as a postdoctoral scholar at Harvard University, where she was a lecturer in Social Studies and at Harvard Law School, as well as a research fellow at Harvard’s W.E.B. Du Bois Research Institute in the Hutchins Center. Later, she was a postdoctoral fellow at the Princeton Institute for International and Regional Studies and an affiliate of the Princeton Society of Fellows in the Liberal Arts.

In 2016, Coyle Rosen joined the faculty of Princeton University. At Princeton, Coyle Rosen was a faculty fellow with the Fung Global Fellows Program, as well as an affiliate faculty member at the Center for Culture, Society, and Religion, the Program in Law and Public Affairs, and the Program in African Studies . She received grants from the University Center for Human Values, the University Committee on Research in the Humanities and Social Sciences, and the Humanities Council. In 2018–2019, she was awarded a David A. Gardner ’69 Magic Grant to organize interdisciplinary events on themes of spirituality and consciousness She was also granted the university’s 250th Anniversary Fund Award for Innovation in Undergraduate Education for developing novel approaches to teaching anthropology. She went on to earn Princeton’s President’s Award for Distinguished Teaching in 2022.

Coyle Rosen remained on Princeton’s anthropology faculty until 2023. Afterwards, she continued her scholarly work as an External Faculty Group member at the Institute on the Formation of Knowledge at the University of Chicago and as a non-residential fellow at Harvard University.

== Research ==
Coyle Rosen's research lies at the intersections of law, politics, art, religion, spirituality, and society. Her work has investigated how legal systems and spiritual beliefs coexist and shape people’s lives.

One of Coyle Rosen’s primary field sites has been Ghana, in West Africa. There she conducted in-depth ethnographic fieldwork in the gold mining town of Obuasi, studying conflicts over mining, labor, and land. Her research documented how local miners, community leaders, political officials, and spiritual practitioners navigate disputes with multinational mining companies, and how spiritual practices and beliefs become entwined with legal struggles over resources. She has also studied Akan spiritual communities and their revival in both Ghana and the United States, examining transnational religious movements and the politics of spirituality in diasporic communities. In addition to West Africa, Coyle Rosen’s research extends to the broader African diaspora, especially in the U.S. She has looked at how African religions and philosophies are practiced and transformed in American contexts.

More recently, her research has focused on art, culture, and symbolic power. She explores how spirituality and intuition inform and empower creativity, innovation, and human flourishing. She has collaborated with artists and musicians, including Hannibal Lokumbe and Ani DiFranco, for two recent books. Coyle Rosen also explores these themes in her own visual art, poetry, and music.

== Writing ==
Coyle Rosen's first major book, Fires of Gold: Law, Spirit, and Sacrificial Labor in Ghana, was published in 2020 by University of California Press. Fires of Gold was selected for inclusion in the UC Press’ competitive anthropology series, Atelier: Ethnographic Inquiry in the Twenty-First Century. Cahiers d'Études Africaines in its book review described Fires of Gold as "a dense, compelling and well-constructed ethnography." In Religiology, J. Brent Crosson wrote: "Fires of Gold masterfully theorizes the dynamics of 'liberalization,' which have occurred not just in Ghana but across the world since the late 1980s, as altered early modern ideas about the free market have reformed postcolonial welfare states." The book was also reviewed in the Journal of Modern African Studies, where Raphael Deberdt wrote that the book revealed how "Ghana's praised success as a liberal democracy should be read in the context of the spiritual and pragmatic violence that reshapes the state in what the author describes as ‘a re-spiritualization, or re-enchantment, of sovereignty and political life.'"

Coyle Rosen’s second major scholarly book, Law in Light: Priestesses, Priests, and the Revitalization of Akan Spirituality in the United States and Ghana, was published in 2024 by the University of California Press. Kamari Maxine Clarke wrote of the book: “Coyle Rosen's analysis sheds light on the multifaceted interactions between spiritual belief systems and modern legal frameworks, providing a nuanced perspective on Akan spirituality, its contemporary relevance to political and legal practice, and discourses on justice.”

Coyle Rosen has published another book-length study of the music, life, and spirituality of composer and jazz trumpeter Hannibal Lokumbe, titled Hannibal Lokumbe: Spiritual Soundscapes of Music, Life, and Liberation, which was coauthored with Lokumbe and released in November 2024. Columbia University Press nominated this book for the Pulitzer Prize in Biography, the National Book Critics Circle Award, and the National Book Award. Rock and Roll Highway wrote of the book: “This book is a treasure for anyone interested in the transformative power of music, the history of the African diaspora, and the ongoing struggle for justice and liberation. It is a powerful reminder that music can be more than just entertainment—it can be a pathway to understanding, healing, and profound social change.”

Coyle Rosen coauthored another nonfiction book with singer-songwriter Ani DiFranco, The Spirit of Ani: Reflections on Spirituality, Feminism, Music, and Freedom.

Coyle Rosen is also the author of Goddess: A History, forthcoming with Henry Holt.

Additionally, Coyle Rosen is the author of multiple books of poetry and visual art, which often engage themes of nature, mysticism, and personal reflection. Her poetry collections include At the Altar of the Winds, A Thousand Lit Streams, and Storms of Silent Wings (all published in 2023 as part of a trilogy titled Smokeless Mirrors), as well as Veils of Athena.

== Personal life ==
In 2017, she married Jeffrey Rosen, an author, professor, and the President & CEO of the National Constitution Center. U.S. Supreme Court Associate Justice Ruth Bader Ginsburg officiated their marriage in a private ceremony at the U.S. Supreme Court. Justice Ginsburg altered the usual wedding vows in her officiating, instead stating, “You may embrace each other for the first kiss of your marriage.”

== Music ==
In 2025, Coyle Rosen began releasing (as Lauren Coyle Rosen) chamber dream pop and spiritual jazz songs that she composes and sings, including the singles "In Altar of Star," "Velvet Rain," and "Words on Vapors," as well as her debut album, Purify Flame Dreamscape. She also released reinterpretive covers, including "Heroes" (by David Bowie), "Wild Is the Wind" (performed by Nina Simone and David Bowie, composed by Dimitri Tiomkin and Ned Washington), "Out the Blue" (by John Lennon), "Hallelujah" (by Leonard Cohen), "Haunted" (by Shane MacGowan), and "Nothing Compares 2 U" (by Prince).

Coyle Rosen also released her next five albums in 2025: Covers and Veils in Blue, Apollonian Tonic, Athena Visions, The Fate of Art, and Mirror Skies.

Next Wave Magazine noted connections between Coyle Rosen’s music and her literary works, “Now, with Purify Flame, [Coyle] Rosen turns her deep exploration of the human spirit into hypnotic, emotionally layered songs. Her songs channel personal and spiritual rebirth, painting surrealist soundscapes that feel both intimate and otherworldly.”

In 2026, Coyle Rosen released her seventh and eighth music albums, Twilight Streams and Divine Feminine Mirrors.

== Awards and recognition ==
Coyle Rosen’s research and writing have received multiple national and international awards, including from the American Philosophical Society, the Social Science Research Council, the American Council of Learned Societies, the Andrew W. Mellon Foundation, Some Institutes for Advanced Study (SIAS), the Athenaeum, the Institute for Global Law and Policy, the Hutchins Center, the Program on the Study of Capitalism, the Nicholson Center, the Lincoln Institute, the U.S. Environmental Protection Agency, and the Wenner-Gren Foundation.

== Books ==
Nonfiction

Coyle Rosen, Lauren. Goddess. Henry Holt, forthcoming.

DiFranco, Ani, and Lauren Coyle Rosen. The Spirit of Ani: Reflections on Spirituality, Feminism, Music, and Freedom. Akashic Books, 2026.

Coyle Rosen, Lauren, and Hannibal Lokumbe. Hannibal Lokumbe: Spiritual Soundscapes of Music, Life, and Liberation. Columbia University Press, 2024. ISBN 978-0-231-56193-8

Coyle Rosen, Lauren. Law in Light: Priestesses, Priests, and the Revitalization of Akan Spirituality in the United States and Ghana. University of California Press, 2023. ISBN 978-0-520-39709-5

Coyle Rosen, Lauren. Fires of Gold: Law, Spirit, and Sacrificial Labor in Ghana. University of California Press, 2020. ISBN 978-0-520-97473-9

Poetry and Visual Art

Coyle Rosen, Lauren. Veils of Athena. Seven Lighthouses, 2024. ISBN 979-8-3025-5340-9

Coyle Rosen, Lauren. Solarium. Seven Lighthouses, 2024. ISBN 979-8-3279-0386-9

Coyle Rosen, Lauren. Veils of Apollo. Seven Lighthouses, 2024. ISBN 979-8-8833-8582-6

Coyle Rosen, Lauren. Seven Tones of Time. Seven Lighthouses, 2023. ISBN 979-8-3992-8011-0

Coyle Rosen, Lauren. Sky Ensouled. Seven Lighthouses, 2023. ISBN 979-8-3753-9711-5

Coyle Rosen, Lauren. Storms of Silent Wings, 2023. ISBN 979-8-3730-8359-1

Coyle Rosen, Lauren. A Thousand Lit Streams, 2023. ISBN 979-8-3730-8434-5

Coyle Rosen, Lauren. At the Altar of the Winds, 2023. ISBN 979-8-3723-1416-0
