= Seminole, Florida =

- City
- City of Seminole
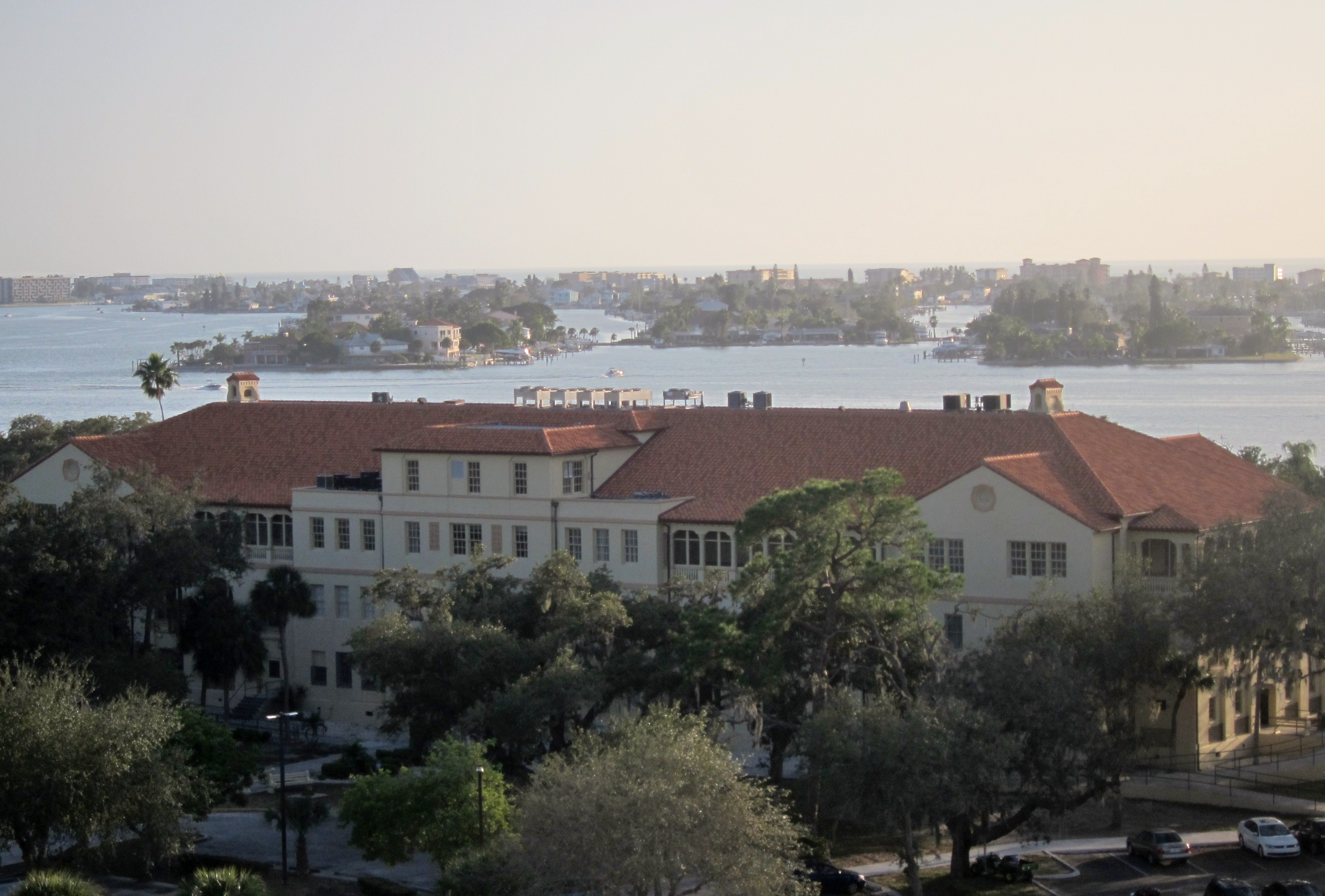
- Panorama of Seminole

- Seal

- Location in Pinellas County and the state of Florida
- Coordinates: 27°51′33″N 82°47′46″W
- Country: United States
- State: Florida
- County: Pinellas

Government
  - Type: Council–manager
  - Mayor: Leslie Waters

Area
  - Total: 5.68 sq mi (14.71 km^{2})
  - Land: 5.18 sq mi (13.42 km^{2})
  - Water: 0.50 sq mi (1.29 km^{2})
- Elevation: 3 ft (0.91 m)

Population (2020)
  - Total: 19,364
  - Density: 3,737.0/sq mi (1,442.87/km^{2})
- Time zone: UTC-5 (Eastern (EST))
  - Summer (DST): UTC-4 (EDT)
- ZIP codes: 33772-33778
- Area code: 727
- FIPS code: 12-64975
- GNIS feature ID: 2405442
- Website: www.myseminole.com

Seminole is a city in Pinellas County, Florida, United States. It is part of the Tampa Bay area. The population was 19,364 at the 2020 census.

== History ==
The first white settlement at Seminole was made in the 1840s. This community was named after the Seminole tribe, whose descendants still inhabited the area. Seminole was incorporated in 1970. In April 2015, demolition began at Seminole Mall, which was planned to be replaced by the outdoor Seminole City Center.

== Geography ==
Seminole is surrounded by Pinellas County enclaves in all directions. Its closest neighbors are Indian Rocks Beach to the northwest, Largo to the north, Pinellas Park to the east, St. Petersburg to the south, and Madeira Beach to the west. Its main arteries are State Road 694 and Alternate U.S. Highway 19. It embraces the lower half of the lower limb of Lake Seminole.

According to the United States Census Bureau, the city has a total area of 5.6 square miles (14.6 km^{2}), of which 5.1 square miles (13.2 km^{2}) is land and 0.54 square miles (1.4 km^{2}), comprising 9.58%, is water.

== Demographics ==
Historical population
Census	Pop.	Note	%±
1980	4,586		—
1990	9,251		101.7%
2000	10,890		17.7%
2010	17,233		58.2%
2020	19,364		12.4%
2023 (est.)	19,252	▼	−0.6%
U.S. Decennial Census

=== Racial and ethnic composition ===
Seminole racial composition (Hispanics excluded from racial categories) (NH = Non-Hispanic)
Race	Pop 2010	Pop 2020	% 2010	% 2020
White (NH)	15,600	16,313	90.52%	84.24%
Black or African American (NH)	229	427	1.33%	2.21%
Native American or Alaska Native (NH)	56	50	0.32%	0.26%
Asian (NH)	395	623	2.29%	3.22%
Pacific Islander or Native Hawaiian (NH)	8	6	0.05%	0.03%
Some other race (NH)	15	90	0.09%	0.47%
Two or more races/Multiracial (NH)	180	609	1.04%	3.15%
Hispanic or Latino (any race)	750	1,246	4.35%	6.43%
Total	17,233	19,364		

=== 2020 census ===
As of the 2020 census, Seminole had a population of 19,364. The median age was 55.9 years. 13.6% of residents were under the age of 18 and 34.2% of residents were 65 years of age or older. For every 100 females there were 86.1 males, and for every 100 females age 18 and over there were 84.5 males age 18 and over.

100.0% of residents lived in urban areas, while 0.0% lived in rural areas.

There were 9,648 households in Seminole, of which 17.2% had children under the age of 18 living in them. Of all households, 40.9% were married-couple households, 18.8% were households with a male householder and no spouse or partner present, and 34.2% were households with a female householder and no spouse or partner present. About 40.9% of all households were made up of individuals and 25.8% had someone living alone who was 65 years of age or older.

There were 11,216 housing units, of which 14.0% were vacant. The homeowner vacancy rate was 2.5% and the rental vacancy rate was 11.0%.

Racial composition as of the 2020 census
Race	Number	Percent
White	16,669	86.1%
Black or African American	449	2.3%
American Indian and Alaska Native	63	0.3%
Asian	626	3.2%
Native Hawaiian and Other Pacific Islander	6	0.0%
Some other race	302	1.6%
Two or more races	1,249	6.5%
Hispanic or Latino (of any race)	1,246	6.4%

=== Income ===
In 2019, the median income for a household in the city was $53,975. The per capita income for the city was $42,159.

=== 2010 census ===
As of the 2010 United States census, there were 17,233 people, 8,402 households, and 4,207 families residing in the city.

In 2010, the mean income for a household in the city was $45,730, and the median income for a family was $63,260. The per capita income for the city was $29,862.

=== 2000 census ===
As of the census of 2000, there were 10,890 people, 5,989 households, and 2,701 families residing in the city. The population density was 1,702.3/km^{2} (4,402.1/mi^{2}). There are 7,297 housing units at an average density of 1,140.6/km^{2} (2,949.7/mi^{2}). The racial makeup of the city was 96.61% White, 0.48% African American, 0.34% Native American, 0.85% Asian, 0.03% Pacific Islander, 0.41% from other races, and 1.28% from two or more races. 2.25% of the population were Hispanic or Latino of any race.

In 2000, there were 5,989 households out of which 12.6% have children under the age of 18 living with them, 35.4% were married couples living together, 7.4% had a female householder with no husband present, and 54.9% are non-families. 49.1% of all households were made up of individuals and 33.8% had someone living alone who is 65 years of age or older. The average household size was 1.75 and the average family size was 2.48.

In 2000, in the city the population age distribution was 11.8% under the age of 18, 3.8% from 18 to 24, 19.5% from 25 to 44, 21.3% from 45 to 64, and 43.6% who were 65 years of age or older. The median age was 59 years. For every 100 females there were 76.2 males. For every 100 females age 18 and over, there were 72.3 males.

In 2000, the median income for a household in the city was $29,179, and the median income for a family was $39,491. Males had a median income of $29,237 versus $25,588 for females. The per capita income for the city was $20,951. 9.0% of the population and 5.1% of families were below the poverty line. Out of the total population, 5.7% of those under the age of 18 and 9.7% of those 65 and older were living below the poverty line.

== Recreation and library ==
The City of Seminole has many park spaces for its community to get outside. Its four parks and recreation center area provide people of all ages space to relax and play. Overlooking a large pond with a variety of birds and other wildlife, Seminole City Park is located on the Pinellas Trail (with water and bathrooms) and has a large playground with several pavilions that can be rented. Many events (like the Music in the Park series) are held in its amphitheater area, and the Seminole Historical Society building sits adjacent. A second city park sits along the Pinellas Trail—Orange Blossom Park—which has a newly constructed large playground, trail, basketball court, and bathrooms. Tennis Club Park is as it sounds—full of tennis courts. The city's newest park is Waterfront Park, which held its playground ribbon-cutting in 2021 and features a waterfront boardwalk, canoe and kayak launch, walking trail, pavilions, bathrooms, and a playground.

Several Pinellas County parks are in the Seminole area, including Lake Seminole Park, Boca Ciega Millennium Park, and Walsingham Park.

=== Library ===
The Seminole Community Library was established in 1960 with the donation of 3,500 books. The library was started by the Seminole Ridge Business and Professional Women's Club and was located in a local home owned by Home Federal Savings and Loan. The library was run by members of the Women's Club until June 1964 when the running of the library was turned over to the newly created Friends of the Library group. The library soon grew to 6,000 volumes and a new location was needed to house the growing collection.

In 1965, Home Federal Savings and Loan offered for the library to be moved into an open space in a nearby motel which they owned. The library was run during this time entirely by volunteers and members of local civic groups.

The library soon outgrew this space as well. In 1971, the Seminole Community Library moved into a new location at 11000 Johnson Boulevard. This building, paid for by the city as well as by citizen donations, was 2,400 square feet and housed the libraries 15,000 volume collection. The community again showed their generous support of the library with furnishings donated by the Pinellas-Seminole Woman’s Club. Two additions were added to this building, one in 1974 to add a reading and reference room, and another in 1984 to create more room for the children's section as well as shelf space for the library's audiobook collection.

In 1989, the City of Seminole finally took ownership of the library, agreeing to administer and fund the service for the community. The Seminole Library Association, which had run the library until that time, was dissolved and all remaining funds were turned over to the city. In 1992, the library again moved to a newly constructed building, partially funded through a $400,000 state grant. This building was 17,000 square feet and housed the library’s 60,000 item collection. With the new building, membership increased and internet access was added for the first time.

When the St. Petersburg College opened their Seminole campus in 1998, across the street from the library, talks began with the City of Seminole to begin a partnership in serving both the community as well as the colleges students. The two organizations agreed to join forces, and a new library building was built on the SPC Seminole campus as a joint public library and college library. The current Seminole Community Library building opened on August 10, 2003, and is located at 9200 113th Street North.

The Seminole Community Library is a member of the Pinellas Public Library Cooperative and provides materials, resources, services, and programs to both Pinellas County residents as well as SPC students.

== Notable people ==
- Larry Bearnarth, professional baseball player, scout, and coach
- Angela Elwell Hunt, author
- Nicole Johnson, Miss America 1999
- Casey Kotchman, Major League Baseball player
- Brittany Lincicome, professional golfer
- Brett Phillips, Major League Baseball player
- Randy Savage, pro wrestler
- Bobby Wilson, Major League Baseball player

== Gallery ==
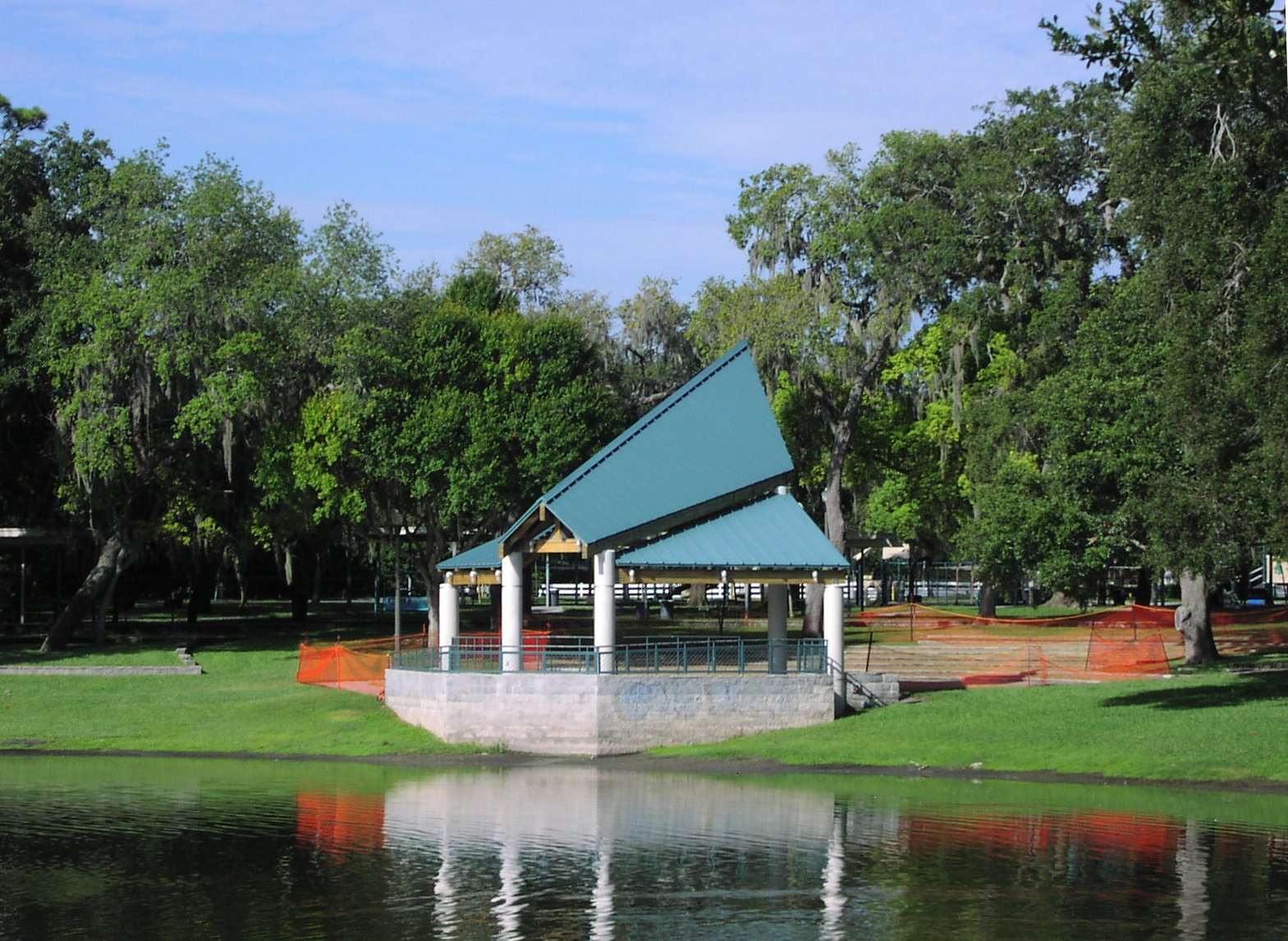
The lake and band shell at Seminole City Park

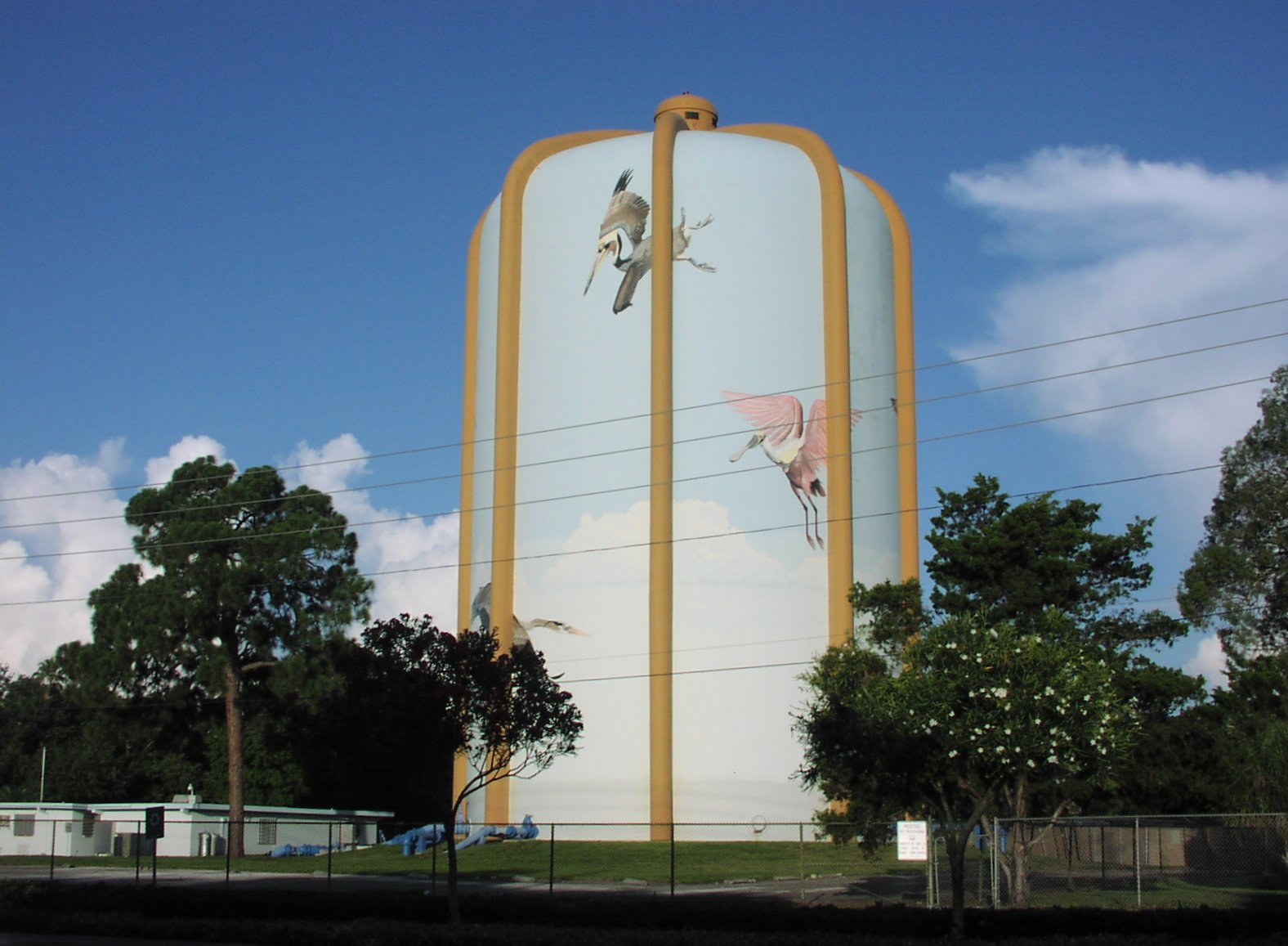
Former Seminole City Water Tower @ 113th Street and Park Boulevard
