= United States v. John (1978) =

- Supreme Court of the United States

Argued April 19, 1978 Decided June 23, 1978
- Full case name: United States v. Smith John and Harry Smith John; Smith John and Harry Smith John v. State of Mississippi
- Citations: 437 U.S. 634 (more) 98 S. Ct. 2541; 57 L. Ed. 2d 489; 1978 U.S. LEXIS 124

Case history
- Prior: United States v. John, 560 F.2d 1202 (5th Cir. 1977); John v. State, 347 So.2d 959 (Miss. 1977)
- Subsequent: United States v. John, 587 F.2d 683 (5th Cir. 1979)

Holding
- Held that lands designated as a reservation in Mississippi are "Indian country" as defined by statute, and under the Major Crimes Act, the State has no jurisdiction to try an Indian for crimes covered by that act. Fifth Circuit Court reversed and remanded, Mississippi Supreme Court reversed.

Court membership
- Chief Justice Warren E. Burger Associate Justices William J. Brennan Jr. · Potter Stewart; Byron White · Thurgood Marshall; Harry Blackmun · Lewis F. Powell Jr. William Rehnquist · John P. Stevens

Case opinion
- Majority: Blackmun, joined by unanimous

Laws applied
- 18 U.S.C. §§ 1151–1153

United States v. John, 437 U.S. 634 (1978), was a case in which the Supreme Court of the United States held that lands designated as a reservation in Mississippi are "Indian country" as defined by statute, although the reservation was established nearly a century after Indian removal and related treaties. The court ruled that, under the Major Crimes Act, the State has no jurisdiction to try a Native American for crimes covered by that act that occurred on reservation land.

== Background ==
=== History ===
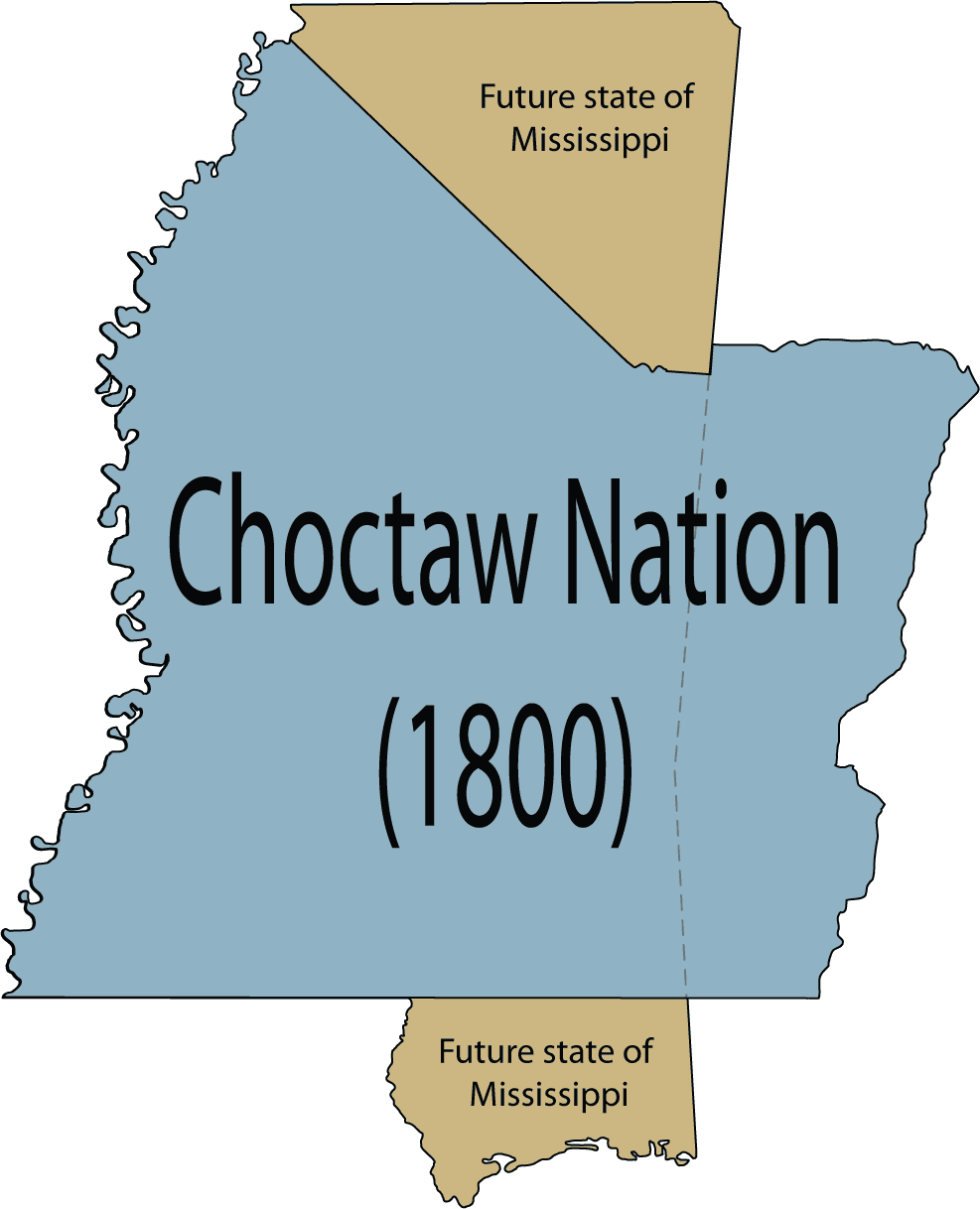
Original Choctaw territory in Mississippi

The Choctaw lived in Mississippi and other areas of the Southeast since well before the Revolutionary War, and were recognized by their treaty with the United States in 1786. (Note: Treaty of Hopewell.) When Mississippi became a state in 1817, the Choctaw still held three-quarters of the land in the state. There was pressure from European Americans on the federal government and state to open these lands for white settlement. Federal policy at that time was to encourage the removal of the Choctaw and other Native Americans to Indian Territory west of the Mississippi River, in what became present-day Oklahoma. In 1820 and again in 1830, the tribe signed two treaties (Note: The Treaty of Doak's Stand and the Treaty of Dancing Rabbit Creek.) ceding almost all of their land in Mississippi to the United States.

By 1835, most of the tribe had been removed to the Indian Territory, but many members stayed in Mississippi. In the 1890s the federal government became aware that not all the Choctaw had left. By 1916, the Bureau of Indian Affairs (BIA) began to set aside funds to provide for some of the needs of the tribe.

In the 1930s, the Franklin D. Roosevelt administration encouraged the revival of Native American tribes with the passage of the Indian Reorganization Act. In 1939 Congress authorized funds to provide a reservation for what was to become the federally recognized Mississippi Band of Choctaw Indians. In 1944, the Secretary of the Interior set aside 15,000 acres (6,100 ha; 23 sq mi) as an Indian reservation.

=== Major Crimes Act ===
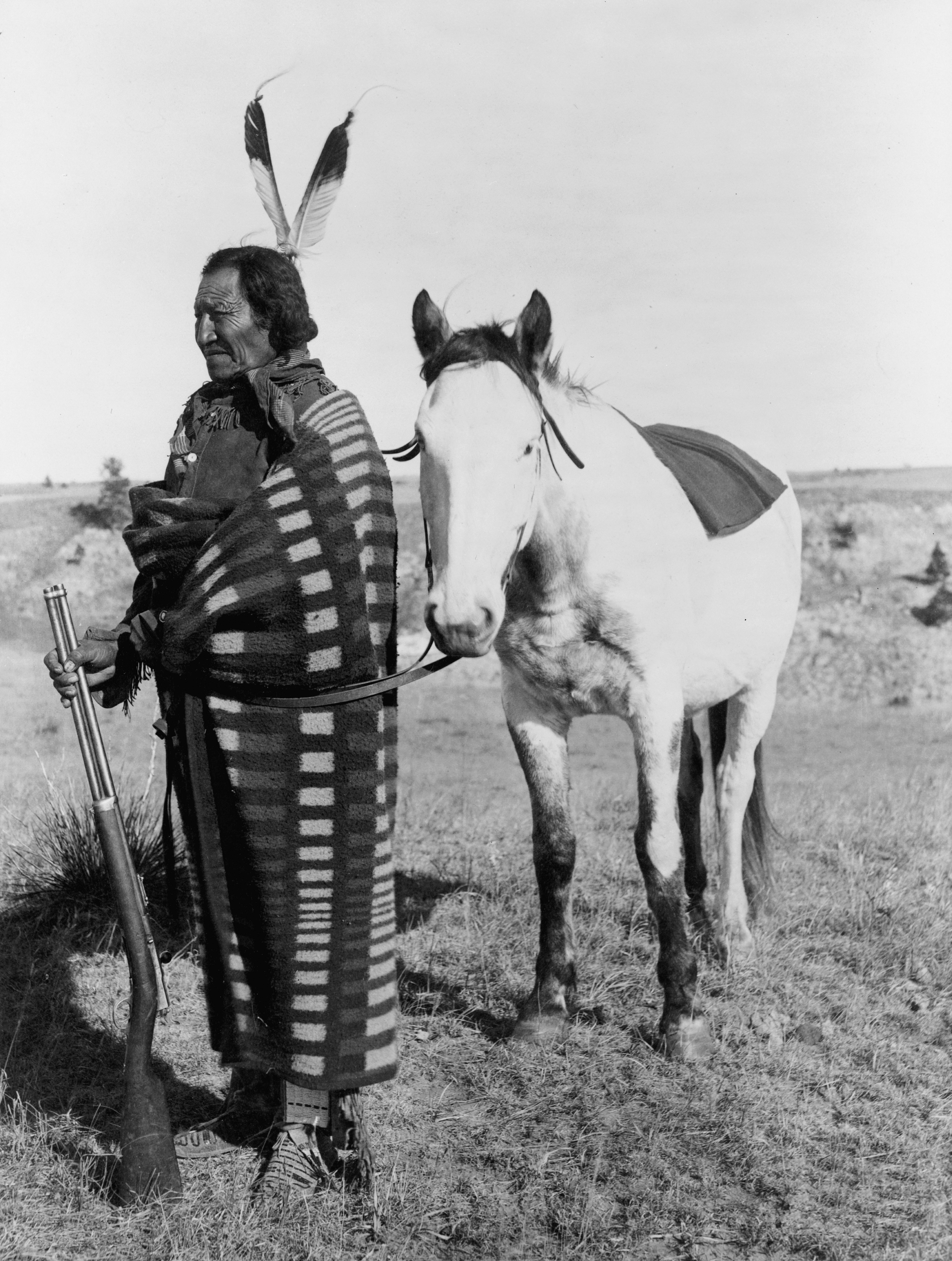
Crow Dog

Because Native American tribes were considered sovereign, crimes committed by Indians against Indians were not subject to federal or state jurisdiction, but were handled by tribal law. In 1881, a Brulé Sioux named Crow Dog shot and killed another Indian, Spotted Tail, on the Great Sioux Reservation in South Dakota. Crow Dog was tried in federal court for murder, found guilty, and was sentenced to hang. He petitioned for a writ of habeas corpus to the Supreme Court.

In Ex Parte Crow Dog, the Supreme Court found that the federal government did not have jurisdiction to try the case. Crow Dog was ordered released, having made restitution under tribal law to Spotted Tail's family, as was considered acceptable within the tribe. (Note: The restitution consisted of $600 (or $50 in one source), eight ponies, and one blanket.)

In response to Ex Parte Crow Dog, Congress passed the Major Crimes Act in 1885. The Act provided that the federal government had exclusive jurisdiction (Note: The federal government has exclusive jurisdiction as regards the states; however, the Indian tribes retain concurrent jurisdiction for these offenses) over certain Indian on Indian crimes (Note: The crimes covered were murder, manslaughter, rape, assault with intent to commit murder, arson, burglary, and larceny.) when the crimes were committed in "Indian country." (Note: Indian country was defined as all reservation land, all dependent Indian communities, and all Indian allotments.) In 1886, the Act was upheld by the Supreme Court in United States v. Kagama.

=== Procedural history ===
In October 1975, Smith John and his son, Harry Smith John (Note: Harry Smith John died on February 18, 1978, and the appeal in regards to him is moot.) were indicted for assault with intent to commit the murder of Artis Jenkins. All of the parties were Choctaw, and the assault occurred on the reservation. Both John and his son were tried in the Federal District Court and convicted of simple assault. John was sentenced to 90 days in jail and a $300 fine.

Subsequent to that trial, John and his son were indicted by a state grand jury in Leake County, Mississippi for aggravated assault, based on the same facts. John objected to state jurisdiction, which was denied. He was convicted and sentenced to two years in the state prison.

John appealed both convictions. In May 1997, the Mississippi Supreme Court determined that the Indian title to the land was extinguished under the removal treaties. Under the treaties, the Mississippi Constitution, and Mississippi statutes, the Choctaw who remained in the state after removal became citizens of the United States and Mississippi, and thus subject to state law. Because of this, the state ruled that the reservation land in Mississippi is not sovereign "Indian country." Following this ruling, the Fifth Circuit Court came to the same conclusion. It reversed the federal conviction on the grounds that the district court lacked jurisdiction. The United States appealed to the U.S. Supreme Court, which granted certiorari to hear the cases.

== U.S. Supreme Court ==
=== Arguments ===
==== United States ====
The United States was represented by H. Bartow Farr III. The United States argued that the reservation land, where the crime was committed, was undisputably land purchased by the federal government in 1939 and held in trust from 1944 as an Indian reservation for the Mississippi Choctaw tribe. By the plain text of the statute, this gives the U.S. District Court jurisdiction, since the lands were "within the limits of [an] Indian reservation." Even if, for the sake of argument, the United States had relinquished jurisdiction following the Indian Removal Act, Congress has plenary power under the U.S. Constitution's Indian Commerce Clause to alter treaty terms and reassert jurisdiction. Finally, Congress has the right to assert jurisdiction over federal land under the Property Clause of the Constitution.

==== State of Mississippi ====
The State of Mississippi was represented by Carl F. Andre. Mississippi argued that the Treaty of Dancing Rabbit Creek ended the federal oversight of Choctaw Indians who remained in the state after 1833. The state claimed that "Mississippi Choctaw citizens did not become a tribe, did not live on a reservation in Indian country, and did not become wards of the federal government as a result of the Indian Reorganization Act (1934) and a proclamation of the Department of Interior (1944)." Since they are not tribal members, the provisions of the Major Crimes Act do not apply, and the state has jurisdiction.

==== Smith John ====
John was represented by Richard B. Collins. John argued that Mississippi could not rely on the Treaty of Dancing Rabbit Creek, as the entire treaty, with the exception of the land cessation, had been breached by the government in other actions. (Note: The treaty promised that the new lands for the tribe would never be part of a state (now part of Oklahoma), the right to land in Mississippi for tribal members that remained (land was never provided), and the closing of the Oklahoma's tribe's roll in 1906 to Mississippi tribal members.) The superseding treaty of 1855 rendered the 1830 treaty irrelevant.

==== Amicus curiae ====
Amicus curiae briefs were filed in support of John and the United States by the Association on American Indian Affairs and the Mississippi Band of Choctaw Indians. No briefs were filed in support of Mississippi.

=== Opinion of the Court ===
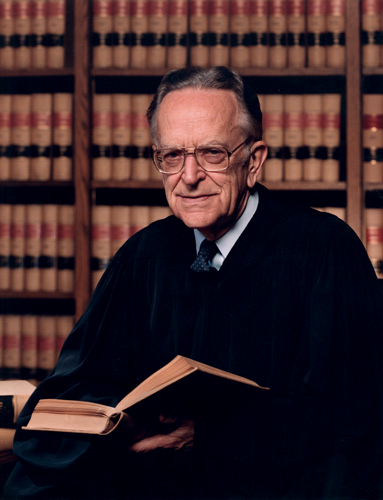
Justice Harry Blackmun, author of the unanimous opinion

Justice Harry Blackmun delivered the opinion of a unanimous court. Blackmun noted that the definition of Indian country in the statute included three separate types of land, and reservation land was applicable to this case. The test for determining if land was reservation land was if the land in question “had been validly set apart for the use of the Indians as such, under the superintendence of the Government.” Blackmun observed that Congress declared that the lands were held in trust for the Mississippi Choctaw in 1939, and that this was further clarified in 1944 when the land was declared to be their reservation.

He said that the reliance of both Mississippi and the Fifth Circuit that the Treaty of Dancing Rabbit Creek ended the status of the Mississippi Choctaw as Indians was misplaced, as the Indian Commerce Clause still granted Congress the authority to deal with them. Since the land in question is an Indian reservation, § 1153 applies. The federal government has exclusive jurisdiction over the crime in question, and the State of Mississippi is without jurisdiction. The ruling reversed and remanded the decision of the Fifth Circuit, and reversed the decision of the Mississippi Supreme Court.

== Subsequent developments ==
Nearly a decade later the Mississippi Choctaw tribe litigated an Indian adoption case, Mississippi Band of Choctaw Indians v. Holyfield, under the recently passed Indian Child Welfare Act. That act gave tribal courts exclusive jurisdiction on adoptions in which the child's parents lived on a reservation. The Mississippi Supreme Court had denied the tribal court's jurisdiction and found for the Holyfields, non-Choctaw who had adopted a child removed from the family. The tribe took it to the U.S. Supreme Court and won; this ruling gave federally recognized Native American tribes more control over the future of their children whose parents lived on reservations.

The John decision has also influenced decisions on other civil issues in the late 20th century, such as taxation. In two Supreme Court cases from Oklahoma dealing with state taxation of Indians, the Court referred to its decision in John to declare that trust land was classified as being in "Indian country", where the state had no authority to tax Indians.

== See also ==
- List of Choctaw Treaties
