= Maine Wabanaki-State Truth and Reconciliation Commission =

The Maine Wabanaki-State Child Welfare Truth and Reconciliation Commission, also known as the MWTRC, was a commission looking at events relating to Wabanaki children and families from 1978, when the Indian Child Welfare Act (ICWA) was passed, until now. The Commission was officially established on February 12, 2012 and issued its final report on June 14, 2015. The MWTRC's mandate was to find Truth, Healing, and Change by giving the Wabanaki people and others involved within the Maine Child Welfare System a place to voice their stories and experiences. The final report addressed findings made by the commission and provided recommendations to improve compliance with the ICWA.

== Background ==
The "Algonquian-speaking Wabanaki People" have occupied many of the Maritime areas in Canada (Quebec, Newfoundland, Prince Edward Island, Nova-Scotia and New Brunswick) and the United States (Maine, New Hampshire, Vermont and Massachusetts) for thousands of years. According to the Institute for the Study of Human Rights at Columbia University, the Wabanaki people share a history of experiencing discriminatory policies. The Doctrine of Discovery (DOD) is one of the policies which was cited a number of times by individuals interviewed by the MWTRC as "the foundation of oppression of Wabanaki Tribes." It has been institutionalized in United States Law by Supreme Court Cases and was responsible for giving Christian Colonizers the power to enslave Indigenous People and take control of their lands. The DOD was also responsible for the creation of the Indian Schooling Board System in the United States which developed schools like the Carlisle Indian Industrial School (1879-1918) whose main purpose was to assimilate Indian children into mainstream culture. More than 10,000 aboriginal children attended Carlisle, 186 of whom died while attending.

In 1958, the Indian Adoption Project (IAP) was put in place by the help of the United States federal government, the Child Welfare League and the Bureau of Indian Affairs. The IAP replaced the institutionalization of Native Children within Boarding School "with a policy of placing Native children for adoption into white homes." In 1966, the IAP was replaced by the Adoption Resource Exchange of North America (ARENA), which continued the work of the IAP by placing Native Indian Children in white homes. Although official numbers cite the IAP as being responsible for the adoption of 395 Native Children, others have argued that in its scope (IAP & ARENA) it has been responsible for the adoption of over 12,486 Native children between 1961 and 1976.

In 1978, the United States Federal Government put in place the Indian Child Welfare Act in response to the crisis affecting Native children and families. Research had found 25% to 30% of Native children were being taken from their homes and that 85% of these children were being placed outside of their families and communities even when relatives deemed fit and willing were available. The ICWA was created to protect "Indian Children's best interest" while promoting "the stability and security of Indian tribes and families".

== MWTRC mandate ==
When the Maine Wabanaki-State Truth and Reconciliation Commission was created, it had seven objectives:

- giving a "voice to Wabanaki people who have had experiences with Maine state child welfare",
- giving a voice to those working in tribal and state welfare system as well as care providers and those involved in the legal system with regards to their experiences with Wabanaki families,
- establishing a more complete history "of the Wabanaki people in the state child welfare system",
- collaborating with TRC Community and Convening Groups "to provide opportunities for healing and deeper understanding for Wabanaki people and state child welfare staff",
- improving child welfare practices and creating sustainable changes which strive to create the best child welfare system,
- ensuring that lessons learnt by MWTRC are not forgotten by providing recommendations to tribal and state governments and "to further the objectives of the Commission",
- and to "Promote individual, relational, systemic and cultural reconciliation."

== Timeline ==
Date	
November 8, 1978	Congress passes the Indian Child Welfare Act to help deal with the high rates of Indian children being placed in non-native homes
1999	The Maine Office of Child and Family Services, and the Wabanaki Tribes are invited by the Maine Office of Child and Family Services to help them improve compliance with the ICWA. Together they developed the ICWA Workgroup. The group helped: deliver training for caseworkers, develop policies and gather baseline data about ICWA compliance.
2008	The ICWA Workgroup begins its journey towards creating a Truth and Reconciliation Commission
February 2010	ICWA Workgroup write TRC Mandate
May 24, 2011	The TRC "Declaration of Intent is signed by the five Wabanaki Chiefs and Maine Governor on Indian Island". The declaration outlined three distinct purposes for the TRC: "truth, healing and change".
June 29, 2012	Maine's Governor along with the five Wabanaki Chiefs sign the TRC mandate at the State's Capital of Augusta.
February 11, 2013	"Meditation and Prayer is held across the state, uniting diverse communities and organizations to pause in support of the TRC's work and purpose."
February 12, 2013	TRC Commissioners are officially seated in a day long event held at Hermon, Maine, thus commencing their work.
May 2013	TRC Commissioners along with staff and consulting members gather for an extensive planning sessions. The TRC office is also opened that day by Executive Director Heather Martin.
November 2013	The TRC commences its first listening sessions within the Wabanaki communities.
June 14, 2015	TRC issues its final report

== Commissioners ==
- Matthew Dunlap: Maine's Secretary of State.
- gkisedtanamoogk: (key-said-TAH-NAH-mook) is Wampanoag from the community of Mashpee located on Massachusetts’ Cape Cod. He is a family member of Nkeketonseonqikom, the Longhouse of the Otter.
- Gail Werrbach: a faculty member at the University of Maine School of Social Work for the past 25 years. She is currently Director and Associate Professor at the School.
- Sandy White Hawk: a Sicangu Lakota adoptee from the Rosebud Reservation in South Dakota" and "is the founder and Director of First Nations Repatriation Institute"
- Carol Wishcamper: has an organizational development consulting practice, working primarily with nonprofit organizations in Maine.

== Final report and recommendations ==
When the WBTRC submitted its final report it had gathered approximately a hundred and fifty nine statements from native and non-native individuals which included native elders, foster parents, former children who were in the child welfare system, judges, tribal attorneys, former DHHS caseworkers and leaders, service providers and adoptees. Members from all four Wabanaki groups—the Maliseet, Micmac, Passamaquoddy and Penobscot—participated in the WBTRC.

Principal findings from the MWTRC included that aboriginal children were 5.1 times more likely to be put into foster care than other children, and that federal reviews from 2006 and 2009 indicated that over fifty percent of aboriginal children did not have their native ancestry verified. This means that the number of aboriginal children within the system who would be eligible within the ICWA is unknown.

The WBTRC found that there continues to be significant public and institutional racism towards the Wabanaki people as well as issues over contested sovereignty and jurisdiction which have made administrating child welfare more challenging. They also concluded that their findings constituted cultural genocide as defined in the 1948 United Nations Convention on Genocide by “Causing serious bodily or mental harm” and “Forcibly transferring members of the group to another group.”

In total the WBTRC made fourteen recommendations. Among these recommendations were:

- respecting the sovereignty and committing to uphold tribal, state, federal protocols for both state and local levels
- honouring "the Wabanaki choice to support healing as the tribes see fit and celebrate the cultural resurgence of the tribes within the Wabanaki confederacy so that both individuals and communities may be strengthened"
- developing Department of Health and Human Services, "legal and judicial trainings that go beyond the basics of checklists and toolkits to recognize bias and build cultural awareness at all levels of leadership and accountability in ways that frame ICWA within historical context."
- creating better support to non-native adoptive or foster families to ensure Wabanaki children have stronger cultural ties
- creating more Native foster and therapeutic homes
- renewing the ICWA Workgroup to help create and implement new training methods,
- with the help of the Wabanaki tribes, creating a policy to "monitor regular compliance" with the ICWA.
