= Association on American Indian Affairs =

Non-profit organization

- Formation: 1922
- Type: NGO
- Legal status: 501(c)(3)
- Headquarters: 6030 Daybreak Circle; Suite A150-217; Clarksville, MD 21029
- Location: Clarksville, Maryland, US
- Chief Executive Officer & Attorney: Shannon O'Loughlin
- Website: www.indian-affairs.org
- Formerly called: American Indian Defense Association

The Association on American Indian Affairs (originally the American Indian Defense Association) is a nonprofit human rights charity located in Rockville, Maryland. Founded in 1922, it is dedicated to protecting the rights of Native Americans.

== History ==
The Association was created by an amalgamation of several non-profit Indian organizations that emerged in the early 1920s. The Eastern Association on Indian Affairs and the New Mexican Association on American Indian Affairs were the first of the predecessor groups to formally organize in 1922. The EAIA and NMAAI members were affluent non-Natives, most of who owned land in Santa Fe and aimed to protect Pueblo culture. The American Indian Defense Association, headed by John Collier, was established to oppose the Bursum and the Leavitt Bills, both of which sought to end Pueblo ties to their lands and outlaw cultural practices. These groups merged in the 1930s and eventually consolidated under the name the Association on American Indian Affairs. Today, the Association has an all-Native Board of Directors and Executive Director. Over the years, the Association has waged innumerable battles, touching on the material and spiritual well-being of Indians throughout Indian Country.

Association timeline

1922 AAIA is formed as the Eastern Association on Indian Affairs

1922 AAIA helps Pueblos protect land and water rights

1944 AAIA helps to establish the National Congress of American IndiansI

1947 First college scholarship awarded and formalized its scholarship program a year later

1956 AAIA establishes Field Health Nursing program

1964-1970 AAIA works to protect Taos Blue Lake

1968 AAIA begins effort to prevent Otitis Media on Indian reservations

1968 AAIA's work with North Dakota welfare officials on American Indian children sets into motion passing the ICWA a decade later

1971 Alaska Native Claims Settlement Act enacted

1978 Indian Child Welfare Act, legislation AAIA helped draft, signed into law

1982 AAIA President Ortiz honored by MacArthur Foundation

1984 Tribal Government Tax Status Act becomes law

1986 Landmark Washington Indian Child Welfare tribal-state agreement signed

1990 Native American Graves Protection and Repatriation Act enacted

1991 The Medicine Wheel Coalition for the Protection of Sacred Sites established

1994 Amendments to American Indian Religious Freedom Act approved

1994 Reaffirmation of the Ione Band of Miwok Indians by the federal government

1996 Bighorn Medicine Wheel Historic Preservation plan adopted

1998 First AAIA-sponsored diabetes conference takes place

2000 AAIA expands grants to summer camps

2006 AAIA creates Dakotah-language Scrabble game and hosts first tournament

2007 Dakotah language K-12 curriculum completed

2008 Tribal amendments to Title IV-E Foster Care and Adoption Assistance Act approved in Fostering Connections for Success and Increasing Adoptions Act

== Programs ==
AAIA offers undergraduate and graduate scholarships to students from federally recognized and non-recognized tribes. It aims to protect and ensure appropriate implementation of the Indian Child Welfare Act, which it helped to draft and enact in 1978 to protect Indian children at risk of being placed in foster care or for adoption. Additionally, the Association collaborates with Tribes and traditional Indian religious petitioners to protect sacred lands such as the Bighorn Medicine Wheel in Wyoming. It also partners with Tribes to educate Native people about diabetes and health-related issues. AAIA played a key role in enacting the Native American Graves Protection and Repatriation Act and continues to support efforts to repatriate human remains and funerary and sacred objects to their tribes. Moreover, it provides funds for youth summer camps focusing on culture, language, substance abuse, and health and wellness focus. The Association strives to preserve Native languages, focusing on the Dakotah language.

== Youth ==
=== Indian Child Welfare Act ===
The Indian Child Welfare Act (ICWA) is a federal law that seeks to preserve Native American families and keep American Indian children who must be placed out of the home with American Indian families whenever possible. The United States Congress passed ICWA in 1978 in response to the alarmingly high number of Indian children being removed from their homes by both public and private agencies. The intent of Congress under ICWA was to "protect the best interests of Indian children and to promote the stability and security of Indian tribes and families" (25 U.S.C. § 1902). ICWA sets federal requirements that apply to state child custody proceedings involving an Indian child who is a member of or eligible for membership in a federally recognized tribe.

The Association's advocacy and research served as a catalyst for passing the Act. AAIA's initial activities were to represent Indian parents whose children had been wrongfully removed from them, beginning with a case involving the Devils Lake Sioux Tribe. Later, AAIA conducted a survey of states with large Indian populations in 1969 and again in 1974. The study revealed that approximately 25–35 percent of all Indian children were being separated from their families and placed in foster homes, adoptive homes, or institutions. The Association advocated for the passage of ICWA throughout the 1970s. William Byler, the Executive Director of AAIA in 1974, was the lead witness at the first hearing on Indian child welfare. Following this, AAIA worked with Congress to draft the legislation.

Since its passage, the Association has continued to protect ICWA and work to ensure appropriate implementation through litigation, advocacy, and training. These actions have included legal participation in the Adoptive Couple v. Baby Girl and Mississippi Band of Choctaw Indians v. Holyfield United States Supreme Court cases, working to develop tribal-state agreements and state legislation in several states, and contributing to the ICWA guidebook published by the Native American Rights Fund. To assist tribes more directly, the Association also created A Survey and Analysis of Tribal-State Indian Child Welfare Act Agreements, Including Promising Practices, which can provide a detailed analysis of current Tribal-State ICWA agreements. These agreements determine the relationship between states and tribes beyond the minimum requirements ICWA provides. Without these agreements, important communication between state and tribal officials may not occur, potentially undermining the provisions provided by ICWA and putting Indian children unnecessarily at risk.

In 2019, the ICWA once again came under attack in the Fifth Circuit Court of Appeals via Brackeen v. Bernhardt. AAIA joined 56 Tribal organizations, 325 Indian Nations, 21 state attorneys general, 20 law schools, and 30 child welfare organizations to file an amicus curiae ("friend of the court") brief in support of the Indian Child Welfare Act, drawing attention to the numerous abuses that led to the bill’s passage in the first place. While the Fifth Circuit initially ruled in favor of protecting the Act, on November 7, 2019, it ordered the case to be reheard en banc (heard before all judges of the Fifth Circuit) with oral argument. Following this news, AAIA, the Native American Rights Fund (NARF), the National Congress of American Indians (NCAI), and the National Indian Child Welfare Association (NICWA) together created the #ProtectICWA campaign and filed a new amicus brief with 486 federally recognized American Indian and Alaska Native Tribes and 55 other Native organizations.

=== Juvenile Justice ===
In recent years, the Association has partnered with the Annie E. Casey Foundation and the Juvenile Detention Alternatives Initiative to better understand how juvenile detention centers affect Native youth and to provide recommendations on how these systems can be altered to better serve the young people within them and for society as a whole.

The studies associated with this initiative revealed that, in many cases, there was no real system to identify Native youth, and the youth had to choose to self-identify as Native American to have their proper status recorded. This often led to underreporting of the number of Native youths within these systems since many individuals did not want to alert their home communities to these situations due to feelings of embarrassment or shame. As such, many Juvenile Detention sites do not contact the youth’s affiliated Tribe when brought in for an indiscretion. Instead, they are placed in state systems of punishment rather than receiving the culturally appropriate services offered by their Tribe. These tribal services are proven to produce better outcomes than the state’s alternatives.

The Association used the information compiled in this report to develop recommendations for improving this system. Their aim is to protect Native youth from unnecessary and often counterproductive incarceration, reduce trauma amongst Native youth, and lower rates of recidivism to promote a healthier overall society. These recommendations are as follows:

1. "Develop uniform and consistent protocols for identifying Native youth by Tribal affiliation, in collaboration with Tribes, that are not dependent on the youth’s self-identification or a unilateral assessment based on physical characteristics."
2. "Develop consistent data points to be collected regarding Native youth that includes Tribal affiliation, and base decision-making on the responsible collection of this data, in collaboration with families and Tribes."
3. "Establish notification protocols, in collaboration with Tribes, for informing Tribes when a Native youth enters the juvenile justice system."
4. "DAI sites that regularly interact with Native youth populations should receive concentrated education and training to develop a deeper level of understanding about the circumstances, issues and needs of Native youth involved in the juvenile justice system, in partnership with Tribes and Tribal programs. Other JDAI sites should receive basic universal education about Native American youth and opportunities to support those Native youth."
5. "States and Tribes should execute Memoranda of Understanding for all child welfare and juvenile justice matters. State court and juvenile justice staff should enter into process-driven agreements with Tribal juvenile justice staff and Tribal courts that include provisions regarding how to transfer Native youth to Tribal courts or to Tribal juvenile justice programs; how to identify Native youth; and how to access applicable programming and funding that supports Tribal cultures and traditions."
6. "Explore the availability of relevant cultural programs and detention alternatives based on Tribal juvenile justice programs, as well as Tribal traditions and practices."

Since the publication of this report, AAIA has worked to raise awareness of the problem and facilitate discussion between Tribes, states, and localities on the effectiveness of juvenile detention policies and possible improvements. The Association also continues its work with the Annie E. Casey Foundation to train state and local youth justice workers to serve Native Youth and their communities for improved outcomes.

=== Scholarships ===
The Association began offering scholarships to Native American students attending undergraduate and graduate institutions in 1947. These students must be members of a tribal nation in the United States, regardless of whether the tribe is federally recognized. These scholarships are meant to support Native Americans who are strongly connected to their Tribal Nation and Indian Country, regardless of how long they have been in college or their age.

The Association expanded its program in the 1950s by setting up an Education Committee and a subcommittee called the Scholarship Committee. The Scholarship Committee held its first meeting in October 1955. More recently, the American Indian College Fund partnered with AAIA to help administer the Association’s scholarships.

=== Summer camps ===
AAIA provides funding for summer camps that connect Native youth with cultural experiences while teaching a variety of subjects related to physical and emotional well-being. Self-care and self-advocacy, suicide prevention, and Native American and Tribal history are among the most common subjects taught in these programs. Between 2003 and 2019, the Association granted $212,395 to 136 camps.

The Association initially provided this funding in 1963 to protect indigenous sovereignty, preserve culture, and educate Native children. The program is designed to assist these children in developing better physical and mental health and stronger cultural and political connections to their Tribe and to Indian Country.

== Cultural and community preservation ==
=== Native language preservation ===
The AAIA Native Language Preservation program produces materials in the Dakotah language for use in daycares, schools, and at home to support language learning for families. There is a strong need for language preservation because only a few fluent Dakotah speakers are left, most of whom are elders over the age of 55. Younger people may be able to understand certain phrases or sing Dakota songs but need more proficiency to keep the language alive for the next generation. AAIA materials include books, MS PowerPoint presentations, DVDs, CDs, and an animation piece nominated for Best Animation at the Native Voices Film Festival.

In 2005, with the permission of Hasbro, AAIA created an official Dakota version of Scrabble, including a 207-page dictionary for use with the game. It has sponsored Dakotah-language Scrabble tournaments and made the games available to schools throughout Dakotah communities.

In 2005, the Association collaborated with Sisseton Wahpeton College to produce the first rap song recorded in the Dakotah language. The rap song "Wicozani Mitawa," meaning "My Life," was recorded at a studio on the Sisseton Wahpeton College campus in Sisseton, South Dakota, located on the Lake Traverse Reservation. The director of the Native Language Program for AAIA, Tammy Decoteau, explained that the project aimed to enable "an entire generation of young people" to hear Dakotah being used.

The program has also created a K-2 Dakotah language curriculum that includes books, CDs, games, and other materials for its implementation.

The AAIA has distributed their language materials to tribes nationwide to determine their interest in translating the content into their Native languages.

=== Sacred lands ===
AAIA has worked on sacred site protection for most of its history. This work has included efforts to protect sites such as Devils Tower and the Medicine Wheel in Wyoming and Bear Butte in South Dakota. In the case of the Bighorn Medicine Wheel, AAIA helped create the Medicine Wheel Coalition, a coalition of Plains Tribes who have a traditional history of using the Medicine Wheel and Medicine Mountain for spiritual purposes. With AAIA's support, the Coalition negotiated and signed in 1996 a landmark Historic Preservation Plan (HPP) with the Forest Service and state and local government agencies. HPP aimed to ensure that the entire area around Medicine Wheel and Medicine Mountain is managed in a manner that protects the integrity of the site as a sacred site. It has also worked to protect the San Francisco Peaks in Arizona, which are sacred to more than a dozen Southwest tribes who use them in their religious practices.

In 2018, the Association filed an amicus brief ("friend of the Court" brief) with the National Congress of American Indians (NCAI) to defend the Bear Ears National Monument from efforts by the Trump Administration to diminish the land held within its borders. The lawsuit had been jointly filed the year before by the Hopi Tribe, Navajo Nation, Ute Indian Tribe, Ute Mountain Ute Tribe, and Zuni Tribe. They argued that this reduction violated the Antiquities Act of 1906. The amicus brief identified sites and objects within Bears Ears that were not named in the original case but were of significant cultural, historical, and spiritual importance. Due to the reduction, these sites and objects were at risk of being permanently lost or destroyed by this reduction.

The Association has also worked to protect many other locations, such as Medicine Lake in California, Rainbow Bridge in Utah, Cave Rock in Nevada, Indian Pass in California, Petroglyph National Monument in New Mexico, Black Creek in New Jersey, Mount Graham in Arizona, Arctic National Wildlife Refuge [ANWR] in Alaska, and Otter Creek in Montana.

Since 2016, the Association has been highly concerned with the destruction of sacred sites along the United States-Mexico border. Some affected sites are located within the Organ Pipe Cactus National Monument and are sacred to several Tribes, including the Tohono O'odham Nation. To protest the destruction of these sites, AAIA provided a testimony to the United States House of Representatives Natural Resources Committee, Subcommittee for Indigenous Peoples of the United States. In this testimony, they describe the importance of sacred sites to Native American religions and the government’s role in their protection and preservation. These statements were made to juxtapose the Trump Administration’s lack of consultation with affected Tribes and its destruction of sites throughout the construction of the border wall, despite the existence of federal laws that could protect these sites.

The Association works to affect national policy regarding sacred lands and to provide legal training to tribal advocates, attorneys, and federal officials on the laws that protect these areas. Additionally, it has developed the "Native Sacred Places Protection Legal Workshop" handbook for a broad audience, including attorneys, tribal leaders, tribal employees, traditional practitioners, and tribal activists. This handbook covers laws and processes relevant to protecting sacred sites.

=== Repatriation ===
The Association on American Indian Affairs collaborated closely with Congress and other Indian advocates during the development of the Native American Graves Protection and Repatriation Act (NAGPRA), passed in 1990. NAGPRA protects the cultural resources of Indigenous peoples, including human remains, funerary and sacred objects, and cultural property. It includes provisions regarding cultural resources, such as their ownership, repatriation to tribes and lineal descendants, and a prohibition on trafficking. Due in large part to this Act, museums and federal agencies across the United States have inventoried and repatriated thousands of remains and objects held in their collections. AAIA has played a significant role in the implementation of NAGPRA. It has facilitated the repatriation of almost 2,000 human remains to Dakota tribes and sacred objects to many tribes. In addition, AAIA has submitted amicus briefs in NAGPRA cases, written legal analyses of NAGPRA for public education purposes, conducted NAGPRA training, and filed comments on proposed regulations. The Association is dedicated to aiding in the return of sacred ceremonial material to the appropriate American Indian nation, clan, or family and to educating the public about the importance of repatriation.

The Association facilitates repatriation in various ways, primarily by holding an annual Repatriation Conference. This conference brings together people from multiple backgrounds, including individuals from Indian Country, institutions, museums, federal agencies, academics, attorneys, and many more. Sessions focus on repatriation under NAGPRA and analyze how to facilitate repatriation in areas where NAGPRA does not apply.

The Association has also advocated for the creation and passage of several other important repatriation acts, including the National Museum of the American Indian Act (NMAI Act), the American Indian Religious Freedom Act (AIRFA), the Religious Freedom Restoration Act (RFRA), PROTECT Patrimony Resolution, and the Safeguard Tribal Objects of Patrimony (STOP) Act.

The National Museum of the American Indian Act of 1989 concerns the repatriation of cultural items by the Smithsonian Institution. Initially, the NMAI Act covered only human remains and funerary objects. It allowed for the repatriation of these items when cultural affiliation was established. In 1996, it was amended to include the coverage of the Museum Act to sacred objects and cultural patrimony, following standards similar to those of NAGPRA. Yet, some important inconsistencies between NAGPRA and the Museum Act still change how these two laws operate. Among these are the lack of definitions for terms such as "sacred objects" and "cultural patrimony" in the Museum Act (likely assuming the definitions of NAGPRA, though these definitions are also considered controversial) and the implementation of a requirement that tribes prove "right of possession" to have items repatriated. These inconsistencies often complicate the repatriation process and make it more difficult for tribes to reclaim items of significant spiritual, cultural, and historical importance. The Association often assists with more complex repatriations and pursues changes to this legislation to ease the repatriation process for future generations.

AAIA works directly with Tribes to provide training and technical assistance to facilitate the repatriation of their cultural objects. As part of this commitment, the Association also developed the article "A Guide to International Repatriation: Starting An Initiative in Your Community" to help Tribes and concerned individuals work to return cultural items to their rightful place, regardless of the borders between them.
