= Raymond W. Godwin =

American lawyer

Raymond W. Godwin is an adoption attorney based in South Carolina.

== Personal history ==
Godwin earned a Bachelor of Arts degree from Bob Jones University and a Juris Doctor degree from the University of South Carolina School of Law. Godwin practiced corporate law in New Jersey, from 1982 until he started his private practice in Greenville, South Carolina in 1993. Godwin has two adopted daughters, Erika and Elizabeth.

== Adoption controversies ==
=== Native American adoptions ===
==== Baby Veronica ====
Godwin has been involved in two controversial adoptions of Native American children to white families. In the "Baby Veronica" case, he facilitated the private adoption of a Cherokee child to a white family over the objections of the child's biological father and the tribe. During the hearing in the Charleston, South Carolina court, the birth mother testified that if the documents had been properly filled out with the biological father's name spelled correctly and the child properly identified as an Indian child, the Cherokee tribe might have intervened. Godwin was the attorney for the adoptive couple, not for the birth mother.

Godwin said the US Supreme Court decision, which ruled in his favor, "provides a roadmap for Indian birth fathers to follow if they want to protect their rights under ICWA, such as paying for pre-birth expenses, taking the mother to the doctor and assisting at the hospital."

==== Baby Deseray ====
In the "Baby Deseray" case, Godwin is representing a white family in the attempted adoption of a Shawnee child over the objections of the child's biological father and the tribe. In this case, the prospective adoptive parents, Bobby and Diane Bixler, removed the child from Oklahoma without the Interstate Custody for the Placement of Children (ICPC) paperwork or complying with Oklahoma state law on removing the child. Godwin has been quoted as stating, "Just because the birth father is a sperm donor and has that biological link does not under the law establish his parental rights." Godwin did acknowledge that the Bixlers did take Deseray from Oklahoma without complying with the ICPC or Oklahoma state law. There has been no allegation that Godwin had prior knowledge of the illegal removal or acted unethically.

The Attorney General for the Shawnee tribe in Oklahoma noted that the Bixlers "literally paid their money and split with the kid...". Godwin disputed this, claiming that the Bixlers only left to protect the job of the putative adoptive father. Oklahoma Judge Allen Welch has ordered the return of the child to Oklahoma. The tribe's attorney in South Carolina has noted that since South Carolina Governor Nikki Haley insisted that Oklahoma comply with the South Carolina court order in the Baby Veronica case, it was now time for South Carolina to comply with an Oklahoma court order for Baby Deseray. In addition, the attorney contracted by Godwin in Oklahoma has written to Godwin, demanding the immediate return of the child to Oklahoma, saying, "Since your clients chose to secretly ignore the law it is my position they have all liability for the child's safe keeping until they surrender physical custody of the child and have no right to physical custody of the child."

On October 16, 2013, two adult sons of the Bixlers came forward and alleged that they were abusive parents who should not be allowed to raise another child. In October 2013, Michael A. Nomura, the Oklahoma Administrator of the ICPC, approved Deseray's ICPC retroactively, raising ethical concerns and conflict of interest issues. (Note: The attorney hired by Godwin to handle the matter in Oklahoma, Paul E.Swain, is chairman of the board of Heritage Family Services Adoption Agency whose co-directors are Michael Nomura and his wife Deborah E. Nomura.) Nomura approved the ICPC even though he was aware of a court order directing that the child be returned to Oklahoma and the tribe. On October 28, 2013, Deseray was removed from the Bixler's custody by South Carolina and placed in temporary emergency foster care.

==== Connection with adoption agency ====
In both cases, the attorney for the white families was Raymond W. Godwin. American Bar Association has noted that "an attorney independent of the agency is a 'key component to an ethical adoption.'" The South Carolina Bar does not have that requirement.

==== Call for federal investigation ====
The Shawnee tribe's Attorney General, Charles Tripp, has called for the Department of Justice to investigate the series of adoptions. Tripp stated that the investigation was needed to end the "'human trafficking of our tribal children in South Carolina'." This call for an investigation has been joined by the president of the Charleston branch of the NAACP, Dot Scott, " to ensure that the civil rights of these children and their biological fathers have not been violated."

=== Reeves adoption ===
In 2008, the minor girlfriend of Craig Reeves discovered she was pregnant. She placed the child for adoption and the adoption agency attorney (Godwin) reportedly advised the mother not to accept money from Reeves. Nearly a year later Reeves filed an action with the South Carolina Family Court to contest the adoption. The court's task was to determine whether or not his consent was necessary for the adoption. Its decision was based on whether or not Reeves took parental responsibility for the child during the pregnancy, specifically by providing financial support. The birth mother testified that Godwin as the adoption agency attorney advised her not to accept money from Reeves. However, in court the birth mother "admitted she was untruthful to Father, Appellants, the adoption agency, and the guardian ad litem...." In addition, "The South Carolina Supreme Court found that the adoption agency did not actually instruct the mother to reject support from the Petitioner [birth father]. Furthermore, the U.S. Supreme Court ruled that whether or not the birth mother's refusal of money from the birth father was based on actual advice was "irrelevant, as they both [reasons] have the same effect as far as the Petitioner [birth father] is concerned." Although the South Carolina Family Court found that Reeves had made sufficient efforts to provide support, the decision was overturned by the South Carolina Supreme Court and the child returned to the adoptive parents.

=== Out of state adoptions ===
In April 2006, a 20-year-old woman in Illinois contacted an adoption agency about placing her child for adoption. Godwin, as attorney for the agency, matched her to adoptive parents in South Carolina. The adoptive parents hired an Illinois attorney, Denise Patton, to arrange the transfer of custody. The child was born on June 16, 2006, and on June 19 an Illinois court appointed Patton guardian to complete transfer of the child to South Carolina. After the adoptive parents filed for adoption in South Carolina, the biological father learned of the prospective adoption and filed a motion in Illinois courts to assert his rights, noting that he had never been informed of the birth due to the deceit of the biological mother. The child was temporarily returned to the biological father, but custody was ultimately awarded to the South Carolina couple after South Carolina courts held the birth mother in contempt of court.
