= Indian child welfare laws =

Indian child welfare laws (also known as ICWA laws are laws in the United States that governs jurisdiction over the removal of American Indian children from their families in custody, foster care, and adoption cases. The Indian Child Welfare Act has been enacted at the federal level. State-level ICWAs exist in 14 states.

== State laws ==
In addition to the federal Indian Child Welfare Act, state-level ICWAs have been enacted in 14 states: California, Colorado, Iowa, Maine, Michigan, Minnesota, Montana, Nebraska, New Mexico, North Dakota, Oklahoma, Oregon, and Washington.

=== California ===
The California Indian Child Welfare Act (Cal-ICWA) State Plan was enacted in 2006.

=== Colorado ===
The Colorado Indian Child Welfare Act was enacted by the Colorado General Assembly in 2023.

=== Iowa ===
The Iowa Indian Child Welfare Act was enacted in 2003.

=== Maine ===
The Maine Indian Child Welfare Act was approved by the Governor of Maine on June 30, 2025.

=== Michigan ===
The Michigan Indian Family Preservation Act was enacted in 2013.

=== Minnesota ===
The Minnesota Indian Family Preservation Act (MIFPA) was enacted in 1985 and updated in 2023.

=== Montana ===
The Montana Indian Child Welfare Act was enacted in 2023.

=== Nebraska ===
The Nebraska Indian Child Welfare Act was enacted in 1985 and updated in 2015.

=== New Mexico ===
The New Mexico Indian Family Protection Act was enacted in 2022.

=== North Dakota ===
North Dakota's Indian child welfare law was enacted in 2023.

=== Oklahoma ===
The Oklahoma Indian Child Welfare Act was enacted in 1982.

=== Oregon ===
The Oregon Indian Child Welfare Act was enacted in 2021.

=== Washington state ===
The Washington Child Welfare Act was enacted in 2011.

== See also ==
- Indian Child Welfare Act
- Indian arts and crafts laws
- Native American civil rights
