= Adoptive Couple v. Baby Girl =

- Supreme Court of the United States

Argued April 16, 2013 Decided June 25, 2013
- Full case name: Adoptive Couple v. Baby Girl, a minor child under the age of fourteen years, Birth Father, and the Cherokee Nation
- Docket no.: 12-399
- Citations: 570 U.S. 637 (more) 133 S. Ct. 2552; 186 L. Ed. 2d 729; 2013 U.S. LEXIS 4916; 2013 WL 3184627; 81 U.S.L.W. 4590
- Argument: Oral argument
- Opinion announcement: Opinion announcement

Case history
- Prior: 398 S.C. 625, 731 S.E.2d 550

Holding
- Held that § 1912(f) does not apply to a parent who has never had custody of the child, that § 1912(d) only applies when a relationship between parent and child already exists, and that § 1915(a)'s preferences do not apply when there are no alternative parties seeking to adopt the child.

Court membership
- Chief Justice John Roberts Associate Justices Antonin Scalia · Anthony Kennedy; Clarence Thomas · Ruth Bader Ginsburg; Stephen Breyer · Samuel Alito; Sonia Sotomayor · Elena Kagan

Case opinions
- Majority: Alito, joined by Roberts, Kennedy, Thomas, and Breyer
- Concurrence: Thomas
- Concurrence: Breyer
- Dissent: Scalia
- Dissent: Sotomayor, joined by Ginsburg, Kagan; Scalia (in part)

Laws applied
- 25 U.S.C. §§ 1901–1963

Adoptive Couple v. Baby Girl, 570 U.S. 637 (2013), was a decision of the Supreme Court of the United States which held that several sections of the Indian Child Welfare Act (ICWA) do not apply to Native American biological fathers who are not custodians of a Native American child. The court held that the procedures required by the ICWA to end parental rights do not apply when the child has never lived with the father. Additionally, the requirement to make extra efforts to preserve the Native American family also does not apply, nor is the preferred placement of the child in another Native American family required when no other party has formally sought to adopt the child.

In 2009, a couple from South Carolina, Matthew and Melanie Capobianco, sought to adopt a child whose father, Dusten Brown, was an enrolled member of the Cherokee Nation, and whose mother, Christina Maldonado, was predominantly Hispanic. Brown contested the adoption on the grounds that he was not properly notified in accordance with the ICWA, and won both in trial court and on appeal to the South Carolina Supreme Court. In December 2011, Brown was given custody of the child. The case received extensive coverage in the national media, and spurred calls for Congress to review and make amendments to the 1978 law.

In October 2012, the adoptive couple petitioned the Supreme Court of the United States to review the case. In January 2013, the court granted certiorari, and heard the case in April. In June, the Supreme Court issued a 5–4 decision, holding that a non-custodial father did not have rights under the ICWA, and sent the case back to the South Carolina courts for further hearings on the issue. In July 2013, the South Carolina trial court finalized the adoption of the child to the adoptive couple, but this was prohibited in August by the Oklahoma Supreme Court. The stay was lifted in September 2013, and the child was turned over to the Capobiancos the same month.

== Background ==
=== Indian Child Welfare Act ===
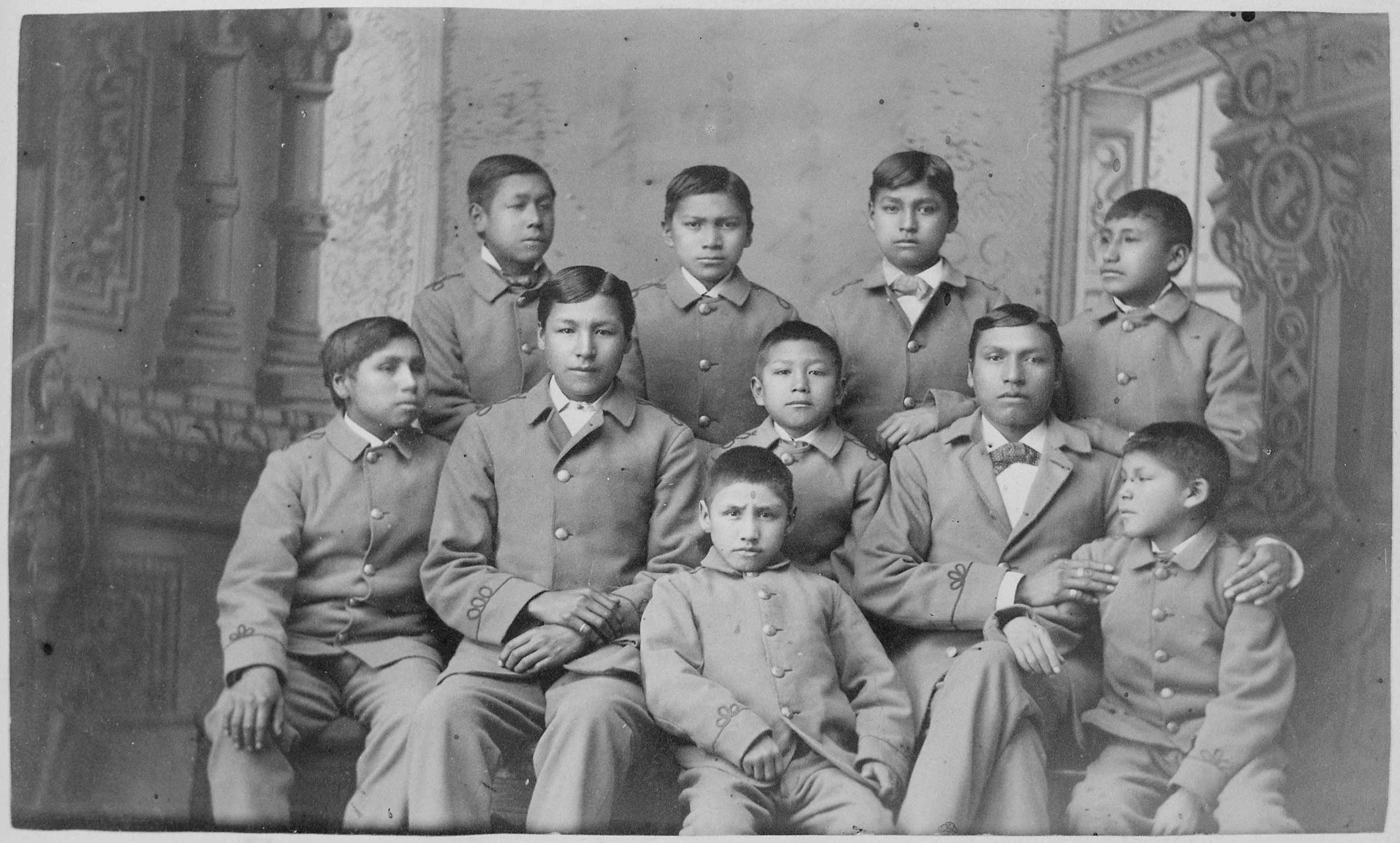
Group of Omaha boys in cadet uniforms, Carlisle Indian School

Prior to the adoption of the ICWA in 1978, Native American children could be forcibly removed from their homes, and placed in either Native American boarding schools or in non-Native American foster and adoptive homes. Studies conducted in 1969 and 1974 indicated that as many as 25–35% of tribal children were being removed from their homes, and consequently from tribal culture. Testimony in the House Committee for Interior and Insular Affairs showed that in some states, the per capita rate of Native American children in foster care was nearly 16 times higher than the rate for non-Native Americans.

In some cases, the Bureau of Indian Affairs (BIA) paid the states to remove tribal children, and to place them with non-Native American families and religious groups. Congress determined that tribal survival would be threatened if Native American children continued to be removed from Native American homes at this rate, and stated that tribal stability was as important as the best interests of the child. One of the factors in this judgment was that, because of the differences in culture, what was in the best interest of a non-Indian child was not necessarily what was in the best interest of an Indian child, especially due to the influence of extended families and tribal relationships. In 1978, the Indian Child Welfare Act (ICWA) was enacted to protect Indian tribes and their children.

The ICWA applies to "Indian children", defined as "any unmarried person who is under age eighteen and is either: (a) a member of an Indian tribe, or (b) is eligible for membership in an Indian tribe, and is the biological child of a member of an Indian tribe." Additionally, in the case of a voluntary adoption of an Indian child, the courts must follow specific guidelines for the Indian birth parents to waive their parental rights or have them terminated. The ICWA provides that to relinquish parental rights, an Indian parent must:

1. do so in writing,
2. do so before a judge,
3. who must certify that the parent understood his or her actions,
4. understands spoken English or has a translator available, and
5. a relinquishment may not be executed prior to ten days after the child's birth.

The Indian parent may also withdraw their consent to an adoption at any time prior to a final order, or within two years of the final order if their consent was obtained through fraud or under duress. If involuntary termination occurs, (Note: Involuntary termination is the termination of parental rights over the objections of that parent, and the normal standard of proof required is clear and convincing evidence. The ICWA requires a higher standard of reasonable doubt.) it must be "supported by evidence beyond a reasonable doubt". When consent is withdrawn, or if the ICWA procedures are not followed, the Indian child is to be immediately returned to the Indian parent.

Tribal rights are also covered by the act. Tribal courts have exclusive jurisdiction for cases arising on Indian reservations and concurrent jurisdiction elsewhere. The case may be removed from a state court to a tribal court at the request of the tribe (Note: "Since ... state social service agencies and state courts are part of the problem, transfer of jurisdiction over child custody matters to tribal authorities is mandated by the ICWA whenever possible.") unless one of the Indian child's parents object. In any case, the tribe has a right to intervene in the proceeding and to act to protect the tribal rights of the child.

=== Case history ===
Great seal of the Cherokee Nation

Dusten Brown is a member of the Cherokee Nation, and served in the United States Army at Fort Sill, Oklahoma. Christina Maldonado was a non-Indian single mother of two. (Note: Although the mother of two other children, Maldonado's other children are in the custody of her parents, to whom she pays child support.) Brown and Maldonado became engaged to be married in December 2008, and Maldonado informed Brown that she was pregnant in January 2009.

On learning that Maldonado was pregnant, Brown began to press her to go ahead and marry him, and refused to provide any financial support until after the two had married.

In May 2009, Maldonado broke off the engagement by text message, and cut all communications with Brown. In June, Maldonado sent Brown a text message asking if he would rather pay child support or relinquish his parental rights. Brown responded via text message that he relinquished his rights.

No child support order was in place at this time. While laws vary from state to state, it is typically not a possibility for any parent to surrender their parental rights without a court hearing that determines the best interest of the child.

A few months prior to the baby's birth, Maldonado began to work with an adoption attorney to place the child with Matthew Capobianco and Melanie Duncan Capobianco of James Island, South Carolina. The adoptive couple provided financial support to Maldanado during her pregnancy, and attended Baby Girl's birth (in Oklahoma), where the adoptive father cut the umbilical cord.

Although Oklahoma law requires that an Indian tribe be informed if an Indian child is to be adopted, Maldonado's attorney misspelled Brown's name, and provided an incorrect date of birth. As a result, the tribe was not notified about the proposed adoption. (Note: The pre-placement form indicated: "Initially the birth mother did not wish to identify the father, said she wanted to keep things low-key as possible for the [Appellants], because he's registered in the Cherokee tribe. It was determined that naming him would be detrimental to the adoption.") After receiving permission from Oklahoma authorities, based in part on the identification of the child as just Hispanic rather than both Hispanic and Native American, the Capobiancos took the child to South Carolina. (Note: There was evidence that had the child been reported as Native American, the Capobiancos would not have been allowed to take her out of Oklahoma.)

Four months after the birth of the child, Dusten Brown was served with a notice of the proposed adoption. Brown signed the document, believing that he was relinquishing rights to Maldonado. (Note: In any event, the release would not have complied with the ICWA, which requires a judge's certification that the parent understood exactly what rights they were signing away.) Brown tried to retrieve the document, but was unable to. He contacted the Judge Advocate General at Fort Sill for assistance. Seven days after being notified of the proposed adoption by the Capobiancos, Brown obtained a stay of the adoption proceedings under the Servicemembers Civil Relief Act. (Note: The act allows soldiers who are being deployed into a war zone to place civil cases against them on hold until they return to the United States.)

=== Trial court ===
The adoption case was heard in Charleston County Family Court in September 2011. Brown contested the adoption, and the Cherokee Nation intervened as a party in its own right in the case. The court denied the Capobiancos' petition to adopt the child, and ordered that the child be returned to Brown as the biological father. Under South Carolina law, a father's parental rights terminate when he neither provides pre-birth support nor becomes involved with the child shortly after birth.

The court noted, however, that the ICWA preempts state law. On November 25, 2011, the court issued a ruling, holding that the ICWA applied and was not unconstitutional. The "Existing Indian Family" exception was inapplicable in this case; Brown did not consent to the termination of his parental rights or the adoption of his child, and the Capobiancos had failed to show by clear and convincing evidence that Brown's parental rights should be terminated. (Note: Although the ICWA required proof beyond a reasonable doubt, the trial court used the state standard of clear and convincing evidence.)

On December 31, 2011, the Capobiancos turned the child over to Brown, in accordance with the trial court order. The Capobiancos then appealed to the Supreme Court of South Carolina.

=== State Supreme Court ===
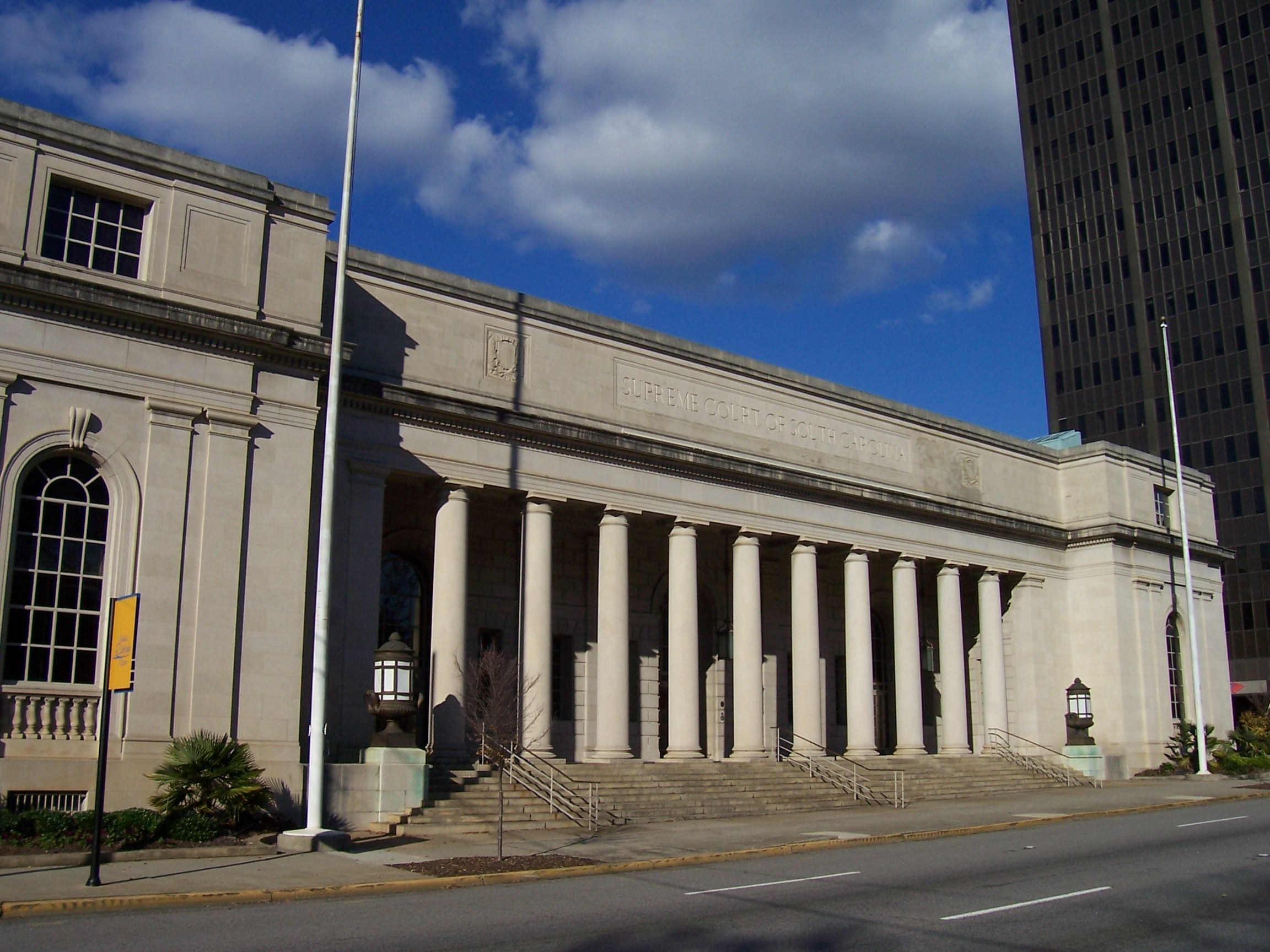
South Carolina Supreme Court building

Chief Justice Jean H. Toal delivered the opinion of the court on July 26, 2012. The five members of the court split 3–2, with Justices Costa M. Pleicones and Donald W. Beatty joining the majority opinion, while Justice John W. Kittredge, joined by Justice Kaye Gorenflo Hearn, dissented. The opinion decided three issues: First, whether the Capobiancos had improperly removed the child from Oklahoma; second, whether state law or the ICWA is determinative of Brown's status as a parent; and third, whether the Capobiancos met their burden of proof to terminate the parental rights of Brown.

Toal noted that the Capobiancos were correct that the removal of the child from Oklahoma did not create an unsafe environment for the child, but they were incorrect on the legal issue. Had Oklahoma been properly notified that this was an Indian child, the Cherokee Nation would have been alerted, and the child's interests as a member of the tribe would have been protected. She noted that at this point, the case was properly before the court, and proceeded to address the second issue.

The Capobiancos argued that it takes more than mere biology to invoke the provisions of the ICWA, and under South Carolina law, a father must not only reside with the mother for the six-month period preceding the birth of the child, but also contribute to pregnancy-related expenses in order to have paternity rights. However, the Court determined that the ICWA does not defer to state law, and the trial court properly determined that the ICWA grants Indian fathers greater rights than state law.

Toal then turned to the last issue: the trial court's refusal to terminate Brown's parental rights. The Capobiancos could not show that Brown had agreed to consent to the adoption. The court noted that the ICWA set out clear procedural guidelines, and the Capobiancos did not comply with those requirements. The Capobiancos also failed to show by clear and convincing evidence that Brown's parental rights should be terminated.

Under the ICWA, prior to terminating an Indian parent's rights to the Indian child, the party seeking to terminate parental rights "shall satisfy the court that active efforts have been made to provide remedial services and rehabilitative programs designed to prevent the breakup of the Indian family, and that these efforts have proved unsuccessful." The court noted that the Capobiancos made no efforts to comply with this requirement of federal law, but had actively sought to prevent the father from obtaining custody since the child was four months old.

The court then addressed the best interests of the child. Toal said, quoting Mississippi Band of Choctaw Indians v. Holyfield, "Where an Indian child's best interests are at stake, our inquiry into that child's best interests must also account for his or her status as an Indian, and therefore, we must also inquire into whether the placement is in the best interests of the Indian child," and that this was "based on the fundamental assumption that it is in the Indian child's best interest that its relationship to the tribe be protected." (Note: Holyfield is the only United States Supreme Court case to discuss the ICWA.) Toal stated that the best interest of the child was to be with her father, which also preserved her tribal affiliation.

Finally, Toal addressed the placement requirements of the ICWA, which requires that placement preference be given, in this order, to: 1) another member of the child's family, 2) another member of the child's tribe, and 3) another Indian family. The court stated that neither Maldonado nor the Capobiancos had intended to comply with the statute, and that the Capobiancos could not thereby claim that the breaking of the bond formed by the child with the Capobiancos is grounds to ignore the statute.

The court affirmed the decision of the Charleston County Family Court in returning the Indian child to her father, and reiterated that the ICWA preempts state law in the termination of parental rights for Indian parents.

==== Dissent ====
Justice John W. Kittredge, joined by Justice Kaye G. Hearn, dissented. Kittredge argued that the state standards for best interest of the child should trump those of the ICWA, and concluded that the trial court judge erred in her findings of fact. (Note: In almost all appeals, appellate court judges are not permitted to find error in questions of fact, instead limiting themselves to questions of law. This is because the trier of fact has the opportunity to observe the witnesses and determine their credibility, while the appellate court judge cannot.) He noted that Brown had an income of approximately $23,000 in 2010, had paid nothing to assist with pre-birth expenses, and had indicated that he did not intend to do so. In addition, Kittredge stated that the record reflected that Maldonado informed both the adoption agency and the adoption attorney of the child's Cherokee heritage, but the notification to the tribe did not have the correct identifying information for the father. At the child's birth, the Capobiancos were present, and Matt Capobianco had cut the umbilical cord.

Kittredge then evaluated the ICWA, noting that South Carolina law did not allow a father in Brown's position to contest an adoption. Brown acknowledged paternity, and a DNA test conclusively proved that he was the biological father. Because Brown met the definition of an Indian parent, the ICWA did apply to the case. Even if Brown had not acknowledged paternity, the child was still an Indian, and the federal law would apply. However, Kittredge then stated that even though the ICWA applied, Congress did not intend the ICWA to replace state law with regard to a child's best interests. (Note: This is the opposite conclusion reached by the majority.)

Kittredge concluded that Brown had "abandoned" his child, and should therefore not be allowed to contest the adoption. He noted that the Capobiancos provided the child with a loving and stable home. Finally, he would have ruled that termination of Brown's parental rights was in the best interest of the child, and would have reversed the decision of the trial court.

== Supreme Court ==
=== Arguments ===
After the South Carolina Supreme Court declined to rehear the case, the Capobiancos filed a petition with the Supreme Court of the United States for a writ of certiorari. Seven entities filed amici curiae briefs with the Supreme Court in support of hearing the case. This included amici briefs by two former Solicitors General of the United States, Paul Clement on behalf of the guardian ad litem, and Greg Garre on behalf of the birth mother, suggesting that the Equal Protection Clause requires applying strict scrutiny to ICWA's race-based placement preferences. (Note: Clement was Solicitor General from 2004 to 2008, and Garre from 2008 to 2009.) The American Academy of Adoption Attorneys, the National Council for Adoption, the California State Association of Counties, and the Center for Adoption Policy were also among those that submitted briefs.

On January 4, 2013, the Court granted certiorari and agreed to hear the case. This was only the second time that a case involving the ICWA had been granted review by the U.S. Supreme Court, with Mississippi Band of Choctaw Indians v. Holyfield being the first.

On April 1, 2013, the court decided to allow some of the amici to participate in oral argument, and divided the time allowed for oral argument as follows: 20 minutes for petitioners, 10 minutes for respondent Guardian ad Litem, 20 minutes for respondent Birth Father, and 10 minutes for the Solicitor General. Brown was represented by Charles Rothfeld, who was a director at the Yale Law School Supreme Court Clinic and Supreme Court litigator with the Washington, D.C., office of the international law firm Mayer Brown. The Cherokee Nation was represented by Carter Phillips of Sidley Austin, LLP. The Capobiancos were represented by Lisa Blatt and Mark Fiddler. Blatt headed the Appellate and Supreme Court practice with international law firm Arnold & Porter. Fiddler was a registered Native American attorney, and the founder of the Indian Child Welfare Law Center. At oral arguments on April 16, U.S. Deputy Solicitor General Edwin Kneedler also appeared, as a friend of the Birth Father.

The issues presented to the court were: "⑴ Whether a non-custodial parent can invoke the Indian Child Welfare Act of 1978 (ICWA), 25 U.S.C. §§ 1901–63, to block an adoption voluntarily and lawfully initiated by a non-Indian parent under state law; and ⑵ whether ICWA defines "parent" in 25 U.S.C. § 1903(9) to include an unwed biological father who has not complied with state law rules to attain legal status as a parent."

Three parties filed merit briefs: the Capobiancos as petitioners, and both Brown and the Cherokee Nation as respondents. Thirty-two different amici curiae briefs were filed arguing the merits of the case. Nine were in favor of reversal, and the remainder, including the United States Department of Justice, supported the respondents generally and/or affirmation.

=== Opinion of the Court ===
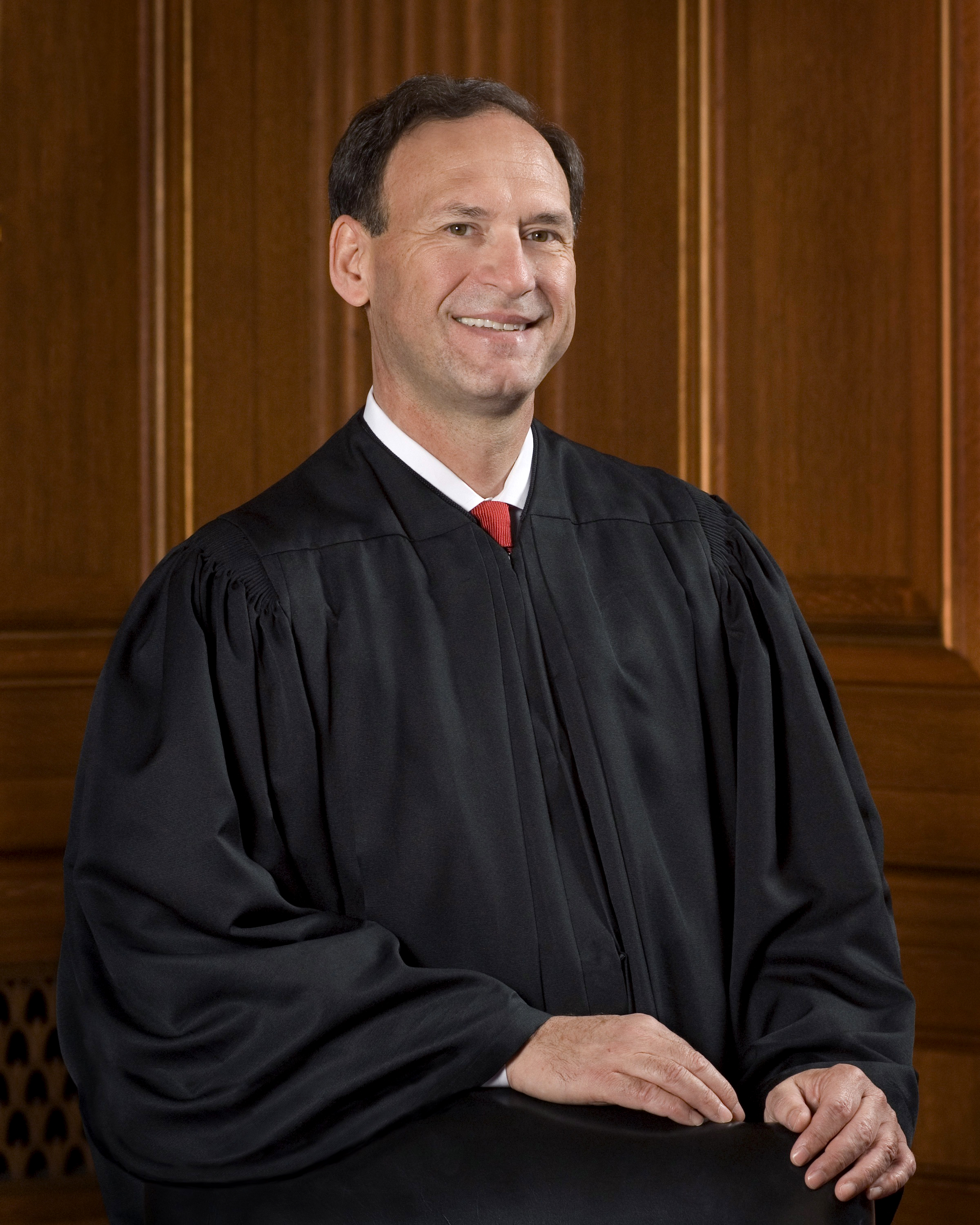
Justice Samuel Alito, author of the majority opinion

On June 25, the Court reversed and remanded, with Justice Samuel Alito writing for the five justice majority. Alito began by observing that Baby Girl "is classified as an Indian because she is 1.2% (3/256) Cherokee." Alito went on to reject the lower court's reading of the ICWA, reasoning it would discourage adoptive couples, and leave "vulnerable Indian children at a unique disadvantage in finding a permanent and loving home."

Alito noted that three provisions of the ICWA were relevant to the case: § 1912(f), § 1912(d), and § 1915(a). (Note: The sections involved are § 1912(f) (proof beyond a reasonable doubt to terminate parental rights), § 1912(d) (remedial services required to preserve family), and § 1915(a) (placement preferences for children). The Court assumed, for the sake of argument, that Brown was a parent under the ICWA, not reaching that issue, having decided the case on other grounds.) He also noted it is undisputed under South Carolina law that Brown would not be able to object to the adoption. Alito stated that the heightened standard required under § 1912(f) does not apply when the parent in question never had custody of the child, focusing on the phrase "continued custody" in the statute.

Alito continued that § 1912(d) does not require remedial efforts be made when the parent did not have custody. Since Brown never had either physical or legal custody, no remedial efforts were required. Finally, § 1915(a) does not prevent a non-Indian couple from adopting when no preferred individuals or entities have formally sought to adopt the child. To find otherwise, Alito concluded, would allow Brown to "play his ICWA trump card at the eleventh hour to override the mother's decision and the child's best interests."

=== Concurring opinions ===
==== Justice Thomas ====
Justice Clarence Thomas issued a concurring opinion. Thomas believed that the canon of constitutional avoidance required the outcome reached by the majority. Contending that there was no constitutional authority for Congress to enact the ICWA, Thomas disagreed with the Court's precedents holding Congress has "plenary power" over Indian affairs, and read the Indian Commerce Clause as applying to only trade relations with tribes. Since the application of the ICWA to the adoption would be unconstitutional, and the result of the majority avoided this issue, Thomas concurred with the majority.

==== Justice Breyer ====
Justice Stephen Breyer also issued a very short concurring opinion. Breyer stated that since the ICWA does not address how to treat absentee fathers, the Court's decision may be too broad. He also noted that the preferential placement order required under § 1915(a) could be changed by the tribe under § 1915(c), and a tribe could, by resolution, grant the absentee father a place in preferential placement.

=== Dissenting opinions ===
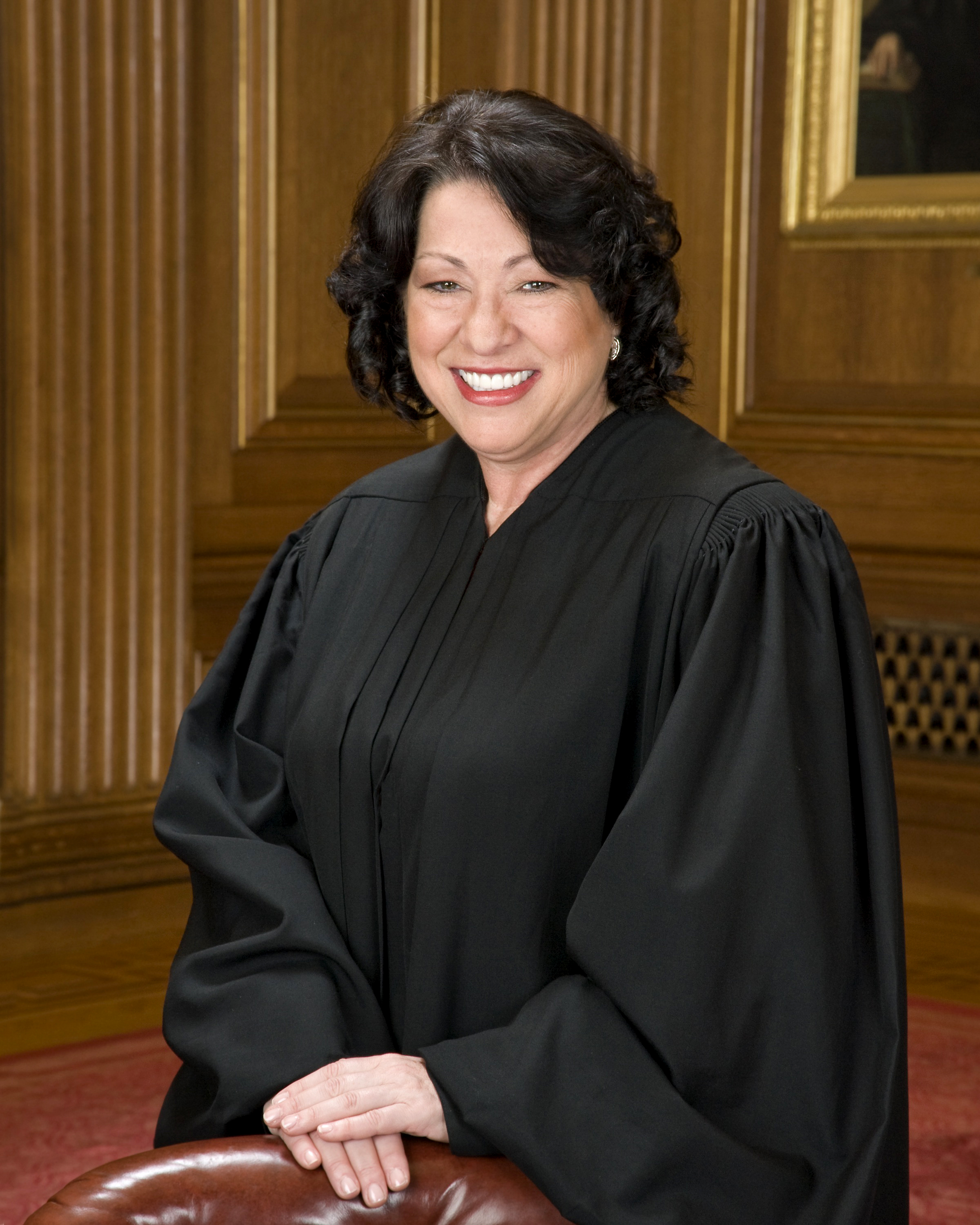
Justice Sonia Sotomayor, author of a dissenting opinion

==== Justice Sotomayor ====
Justice Sonia Sotomayor, joined by Justices Ruth Bader Ginsburg, Elena Kagan, and, in part, Scalia, dissented from the majority opinion. Noting that the majority seemed to consider the Indian placement preference "unwise", she wrote this did not license the Court "to interpret a statute with a view to averting the very consequences Congress expressly stated it was trying to bring about."

Sotomayor reasoned that the majority ignored ICWA's logical structure, and adopted a "textually backward reading" by starting its analysis with the final clause of § 1912(f). Sotomayor stated that "continued custody" in § 1912(f) is "most sensibly read to refer generally to the continuation of the parent-child relationship that an ICWA "parent" has with his or her child". She also stated that even a non-custodial father-child relationship was a "family" for the purposes of § 1912(d), and therefore efforts were needed to be made to prevent its breakup. She stated that the majority turned the law "upside down" to reach their result. Rather than granting Indian birth fathers an "undeserved windfall", Sotomayor reasoned Congress had simply provided the rights birth fathers already enjoyed in several states. By instead deferring to each state's laws, Sotomayor thought the majority read the ICWA as "an illogical piecemeal scheme".

Responding to the majority's suggestion that its reading avoids "equal protection concerns", Sotomayor noted that the Court's precedents have long held that Indian tribal membership is not an impermissible racial classification. She goes on to criticize the "majority's repeated, analytically unnecessary references" to the makeup of Baby Girl's ancestry. Finally, Sotomayor stated that the majority ignored the primary purpose of the ICWA in its interpretation of § 1915(a), and noted that there was nothing to prevent the grandparents from filing a petition to adopt the child. She also observed that nothing in the opinion mandated the return of the child to the Capobiancos.

==== Justice Scalia ====
Justice Antonin Scalia issued a very short dissenting opinion. Scalia noted that, while he joined Sotomayor's dissent, he disagreed with her suggestion that "literalness may strangle meaning". He goes on to opine the phrase "continued custody" could refer to "custody in the future"—in other words, even if the biological father had no custody of the child in the past, he could have it in the future, and therefore, USC § 1912(f) would still apply. Scalia also noted that biological parents also had legal rights, and that there was no reason in law or policy to dilute those rights.

== Subsequent developments ==
=== Media coverage ===
==== Prior to Supreme Court decision ====
Coverage in the mainstream media was extensive. Charleston's Post and Courier ran a series of articles on the case, and the news was picked up by other media outlets. These included local television stations, distant television stations, Cable News Network (CNN), Fox News Channel, national magazines, U.S. News, and The New York Times. Dr. Phil McGraw featured the Capobiancos on his television show in an episode that aired on October 18, 2012. This sparked controversy, and some Indian newspapers and internet news sources called for a boycott of the show, due to what they saw as a one-sided attack on Native Americans. It has also been alleged that the mainstream media has disseminated incorrect and false information that favorably portrayed the Capobiancos and captiously characterized Brown.

Terry Cross of the National Indian Child Welfare Association (NICWA) commented that despite all of the negative press, the ICWA was needed to protect Indian children from having their tribal rights taken from them. (Note: These rights include tribal services such as health and educational, voting rights, holding tribal office, property rights, inheritance of tribal rights, and tribal ceremonies and cultural activities.) He noted that a failure to comply with the ICWA was what caused the controversy in the case. The author of the ICWA, Senator Jim Abourezk, initially remarked that this was "something totally different than what we intended at the time". However, two weeks later, Abourezk clarified that the main intent of the law was to ensure that tribes had an opportunity to sign off on the adoption of tribal children. (Note: Abourezk also stated that "Attorneys and adoption agencies that are involved in these cases and should know the law don't, and don't follow it, and that's when these problems occur." and "Who knows if they went to the tribal court, they may have given them permission, but they didn't.")

==== Post-opinion ====
After the Supreme Court decision, most media outlets stated that the Capobiancos won the case, although some correctly noted that they did not gain custody, nor receive an order of adoption. Some noted that even with the decision, the return of the child to the Capobiancos was not "foreordained", and that the case had to return to South Carolina state courts for additional hearings.

==== Social media ====
The case received a great deal of coverage on social media. A friend of Melanie Duncan Capobianco, Jessica Munday, was a publicist who had previously done contracted work for Melanie Duncan's employer, MST Services [Multisystemic Therapy], in South Carolina. Munday started a "Save Veronica" online campaign aimed at gathering grassroots support for the couple's efforts to overturn both the Charleston Family Court and the South Carolina Supreme Court's decisions. Munday, who ran the marketing firm Trio Solutions Inc. in Mount Pleasant, South Carolina, was responsible for making the case well-known, according to at least one source. Responses from the Native American community pointed out the irony in the campaign, with an editorial cartoon depicting "Veronica" puzzling over a campaign to save her (an Indian child) from other Indians. (Note: The exact language is "Save Veronica from the Indian Child Welfare Act" and Veronica stating "Let me get this straight. You want to save me ... from me?")

On Facebook, a group called "Standing our Ground for Veronica Brown" was created to show support for Dusten Brown and the Cherokee. Supporters have commented about how the Baby Veronica case became a strong example of systemic problems within the adoption industry. The group has organized protests and rallies across several states in order to push for reforms regarding the adoptions of Native American children.

=== Legal developments ===
Maldonado filed suit in the South Carolina U.S. District Court on July 24, 2013, asking that the ICWA be declared unconstitutional. On July 31, 2013, the Capobiancos legally adopted the child. Concurrently with the South Carolina court finalizing the adoption, the Native American Rights Fund filed a civil rights lawsuit in U.S. District Court (Note: The case is styled V.B. v. Daniel E. Martin, Family Court for the Ninth Judicial Circuit.) on behalf of the child, alleging that her rights had been violated by the South Carolina court. In addition, a South Carolina court order cannot be enforced in Oklahoma without the agreement of an Oklahoma court, and Brown stated that he would fight the order in Oklahoma, with the aid of the Cherokee Nation.

Prior to the South Carolina adoption being finalized, the Cherokee Nation District Court granted temporary guardianship to Brown's wife and parents while Brown was in military training out of state. At the same time, a judge in South Carolina ordered Brown to immediately turn over the child to the Capobiancos, which representatives of the Cherokee Nation insisted was impossible while Brown was performing his military duties.

On August 30, 2013, the Oklahoma Supreme Court stayed an order of a district court that the child be immediately be transferred from the custody of Brown to the Capobiancos. The Capobiancos had court-ordered visits with the girl in Oklahoma, while the Brown family celebrated the girl's fourth birthday at a party on September 15. A court-ordered mediation hearing took place between the Browns and the Capobiancos between September 16 and September 20, but failed to produce a resolution. The Oklahoma Supreme Court lifted its stay of the district court order on September 23, 2013, clearing the way for custody of the child to be returned to the Capobiancos. The girl was turned over to her adoptive parents on the evening of September 23, 2013.

On September 25, 2013, the Charleston County Family Court began contempt proceedings against Brown and the Cherokee Nation for withholding Veronica in the face of the South Carolina adoption decree, which was finalized in July. Both parties faced potential financial sanctions that could include defraying living and legal expenses for the Capobiancos during the period that Brown and the Cherokee Nation were allegedly in contempt of court. In October 2013, Brown announced that he was dropping his appeals in order to give his daughter a chance at a normal life.

In November 2013, Matt and Melanie Capobianco filed a lawsuit in Nowata County, Oklahoma, demanding more than $1 million in court costs, accrued during their custody battle. The lawsuit was against Veronica's biological father, Dusten Brown, and the Cherokee Nation. The Cherokee Nation issued a forceful response, declaring that "it [was] not responsible for paying the fees and costs for the Capobiancos because of its Eleventh Amendment sovereign immunity from suits without its express consent." The Cherokees also "made clear the tribe's displeasure with the Capobianco's very public media appearances, interviews, and various fundraising schemes during the same time in which all the parties were under statutory gag order in South Carolina."

=== Academic and legal scholarship ===
After the Supreme Court case was decided, children's rights scholars applauded the decision for eliminating at least a portion of ICWA's overreach, which they view as a reflection of the statute's explicit treatment of children as a "tribal resource" rather than as persons. Professor James Dwyer observed that "ICWA's scope is grossly excessive, treating many children as 'Indian children' who have little or no connection with any Native American tribe, little or nothing to gain by being handed over to tribal authorities or tribal members, and much to lose by being branded Indian children." Dwyer also noted the inherent illogic of invoking an infant's "culture" as a reason for applying a different set of laws (ICWA) to her life when her ancestry is overwhelmingly from cultures other than that to which those laws are connected, an illogic (and insult to those other cultures) that critics of the Supreme Court's decision entirely avoid addressing.

Conversely, legal scholars who promote tribal interests critiqued the case as a missed opportunity to rectify long-standing issues of Indian child removal. Bethany R. Berger noted that the majority's analysis relied on inaccurate claims about Brown's relationship to the child, noting that records indicate Brown "sought to parent his daughter from the moment he learned his fiancée was pregnant," and distorted the fact that Brown was reportedly "1/8 Cherokee", making Baby Girl "1/16 Cherokee", despite repeated claims during oral arguments and in the majority opinion that baby girl was "3/256 Cherokee".

Marcia A. Yablon-Zug rebuked the decision for significantly eroding Indigenous protections under federal Indian law. Dustin C. Jones cynically wrote that the decision "unleash[ed] a new form of invidious hostility toward Native Americans... creat[ing] of two classes of Native American parents"—one group which includes "those who remain in stereotypical, Anglo-American marital relationships" and receive full protections under the ICWA; and a second "amorphous group of parents deemed to have forfeited the parental rights deserving protection under the ICWA, merely because of their absence" (whether absent from their own choice and negligence, or due to happenstance occurrences outside of their control).
