= Indian Child Welfare Act =

1978 U.S. federal law regulating tribal jurisdiction over court cases involving children

Indian Child Welfare Act of 1978
- Long title: An Act to establish standards for the placement of Indian children in foster or adoptive homes, to prevent the break-up of Indian families, and for other purposes.
- Acronyms (colloquial): ICWA
- Enacted by: the 95th United States Congress
- Effective: November 8, 1978; 48 years ago

Citations
- Public law: 95-608
- Statutes at Large: 92 Stat. 3069

Codification
- Titles amended: 25 U.S.C.: Indians; 43 U.S.C.: Public Lands
- U.S.C. sections created: 25 U.S.C. ch. 21 § 1901 et seq.
- U.S.C. sections amended: 43 U.S.C. ch. 33 §§ 1602, 1606

Legislative history
- Introduced in the Senate as S. 1214 by James Abourezk (D-SD) on April 1, 1977; Committee consideration by Senate Indian Affairs, House Interior and Insular Affairs; Passed the Senate on November 4, 1977 (Passed); Passed the House on October 14, 1978 (Passed, in lieu of H.R. 12533) with amendment; Senate agreed to House amendment on October 14, 1978 (Agreed); Signed into law by President Jimmy Carter on November 8, 1978

United States Supreme Court cases
- Mississippi Band of Choctaw Indians v. Holyfield, 490 U.S. 30 (1989); Adoptive Couple v. Baby Girl, 570 U.S. 637 (2013); Haaland v. Brackeen, No. 21-376, 599 U.S. ___ (2023)

The Indian Child Welfare Act of 1978 (ICWA, enacted November 8, 1978 and codified at 25 U.S.C. §§ 1901–1963) is a United States federal law that governs jurisdiction over the removal of American Indian children from their families in custody, foster care, and adoption cases.

ICWA acknowledges tribal governments' exclusive jurisdiction over children who reside on or are domiciled on a reservation, or are existing wards of a tribal court. It gives concurrent, but presumptive jurisdiction over foster care placement proceedings for Native American children who do not live on the reservation. It was enacted to respond to the disproportionate removal of Indigenous children from tribal communities and the resulting threat to the survival of Native American culture.

== Overview of ICWA ==
=== General ===
ICWA gives tribal governments a strong voice concerning child custody proceedings that involve Native children, by allocating tribes exclusive jurisdiction over the case when the child resides on, or is domiciled on, the reservation, or when the child is a ward of the tribe; and concurrent, but presumptive, jurisdiction over non-reservation Native Americans' foster care placement proceedings.

=== History ===
ICWA was enacted in 1978 because of the disproportionately high rate of forced removal of Native children from their traditional homes and essentially from Native American cultures as a whole. Surveys by the Association on American Indian Affairs conducted in 1969 and 1974 indicated that between 25 and 35 percent of Native children in states with a large Native American population were being removed, usually forcibly, mostly from intact Native American families with extended family networks, and placed in predominantly non-Native homes, which had no relation to Native American cultures. In some cases like the Indian Adoption Project, the Bureau of Indian Affairs (BIA) paid the states to remove Native children and to place them with non-Native families and religious groups.

Three executive departments, twenty states, 22 non-Indian private organizations, 35 Indian organizations, and 38 Indian tribal nations provided testimony in the House Committee for Interior and Insular Affairs. These testimonies showed that, in some cases, the per capita rate of Native children in foster care was nearly 16 times higher than the rate for non-Natives. The tribes said that such removal demonstrated lack of understanding by child welfare workers of the role of extended families in tribal culture, and threatened tribal survival by removing children at such a high rate. The process also damaged the emotional lives of many children, who lost touch with their people and culture, as adults testified who had been through the process. Congress recognized this, and stated that the interests of tribal stability were as important as the best interests of the child. One of the factors in this judgment was a recognition that, because of the differences in culture, what was in the best interest of a non-Native child was not necessarily what was in the best interest of a Native child. The latter traditionally have larger extended families and tribal relationships in their culture.

Louis La Rose (Winnebago Tribe of Nebraska) testified:

I think the cruelest trick that the white man has ever done to Indian children is to take them into adoption court, erase all of their records and send them off to some nebulous family ... residing in a white community and he goes back to the reservation and he has absolutely no idea who his relatives are, and they effectively make him a non-person and I think ... they destroy him.

Calvin Isaac (Choctaw Tribal leader) testified:

One of the most serious failings of the present system is that Indian children are removed from the custody of their natural parents by non-tribal governmental authorities who have no basis for intelligently evaluating the cultural and social premises underlying Indian home life and child rearing. Many of the individuals who decide the fate of our children are, at best, ignorant of our cultural values and, at worst, have contempt for the Indian way and convinced that removal, usually to a non-Indian household or institution can only benefit an Indian child.

Congress recognized that four primary factors contributed to the high rates of Native child removal by states. These were

1) "a lack of culturally competent State child-welfare standards for assessing the fitness of Indian families; 2) systematic due-process violations against both Indian children and their parents during child-custody procedures; 3) economic incentives favoring removal of Indian children from their families and communities; and 4) social conditions in Indian country."

Various other groups have also had stakes in these decisions. The Church of Jesus Christ of Latter-day Saints (LDS Church) had an Indian Placement Program that removed Native children from their tribes and placed them into church members' homes. By the 1970s, approximately 5,000 Native children were living in Mormon homes. The lack of knowledge about Native American culture by most social workers also contributed to the high removal rates. Most social workers are conditioned by the "best interest of the child," as outlined by Beyond the Best Interests of the Child (Second Edition), which advocates bonding with at least one adult as a parent figure. This did not take into consideration the tribal culture of the extended tribal family, in which children could have close relationships with members of the extended family. The common Native American practices of having a child cared for by an extended relative was viewed as abandonment by allegedly well-intentioned, but arguably paternalistic, state social workers. But tribal members considered care by an extended family member to be normal behavior and a desirable way to ensure the child was cared for by family.

During congressional consideration, held at the request of Native American advocacy groups, opposition was raised by several states, the LDS Church, and several social welfare groups. The bill was pushed through by Representative Morris Udall of Arizona, who lobbied President Jimmy Carter to sign the bill. It was strongly supported by Senator James Abourezk of South Dakota, who had authored the bill and previously contributed to founding the American Indian Policy Review Commission and the Select Committee on Indian Affairs, each of which he chaired.

Indian child removal is one example of a broader trend promoting Native American assimilation, particularly through the targeting of Indigenous children. Other instances include Indian boarding schools and the Save the Babies campaign. These movements all focused on separating Indian children from their tribal communities, preventing the generational transfer of cultural practices.

Congress's overriding purpose in passing the ICWA was to protect Native culture and tribal integrity from the unnecessary removal of Native children by state and federal agencies. Awareness of the issues facing Native American children was raised by the advocacy and research by the Association on American Indian Affairs. Congress reasoned that "there is no resource that is more vital to the continued existence and integrity of Indian tribes than their children."

==== Legal challenge ====
In October 2018, in the case Brackeen v. Zinke, Federal District Court Judge Reed O'Connor struck down parts of the law as unconstitutional, claiming that it mandated racial preference. In December 2018, the United States Court of Appeals for the Fifth Circuit ordered that O'Connor's judgment be stayed, holding that it violated tribal sovereignty. On August 9, 2019, the court ruled that the law does not violate equal protection. On November 7, 2019, the court voted to rehear the case en banc. The ICWA remained in effect. In 2022 the case was heard by the Supreme Court, who upheld the constitutionality of the law in June 2023 (see Haaland v. Brackeen).

=== Jurisdiction ===
==== Minimum standards ====
ICWA sets minimum Federal standards for nearly all Native child custody proceedings, including adoption, voluntary and involuntary termination of parental rights, and removal and foster care placement of Native children, but excluding divorce and child delinquency proceedings. ICWA provides that state courts have no jurisdiction over the adoption or custody of Native children residing within their own tribal reservation. An "Indian child" is "any unmarried person who is under age eighteen and is either (a) a member of an Indian tribe or (b) is eligible for membership in an Indian tribe and is the biological child of a member of an Indian tribe."

ICWA applies to a "child custody proceeding" involving a Native child. The term "child custody proceeding" involves: (i) "foster care placements," where the child has been placed in a foster home, and the parent cannot have the child returned upon demand, but where parental rights have not been terminated; (2) terminations of parental rights; (3) "preadoptive placements," which means placing the child in a foster home after the termination of parental rights, but before or instead of an adoption; and (4) adoptions.

ICWA does not cover child custody hearings during divorce proceedings. Nor does ICWA cover cases of child delinquency when the child has done something that would be considered a crime if done by an adult. Because Native tribes play a major part in the upbringing of Native children, which is significantly different than that of the parents, the ICWA gives important jurisdictional powers to Native tribes in order to preserve the Native culture and tribal future. Tribal courts hold either exclusive jurisdiction or concurrent jurisdiction dependent on several factors.

==== Exclusive tribal jurisdiction ====
Under ICWA, a Native tribe has exclusive jurisdiction over a Native child who resides or is domiciled within the tribe's land. This includes both reservation land, other tribal lands that are held in trust by the Federal government for the benefit of a tribe or individual, or held by a tribe or individual subject to a restriction by the United States against alienation. The last two describe tribal lands such as those in Oklahoma that were transferred to individual Natives under various laws. The Native tribal courts also have exclusive jurisdiction over Native children who are wards of the court or tribe, regardless of their location.

The first Supreme Court case dealing with ICWA was the 1989 case Mississippi Band of Choctaw Indians v. Holyfield (490 U.S. 30, 109 S.Ct. 1597). This Court ruled that the ICWA gives the tribal court exclusive jurisdiction over a case in which the parent was domiciled on the reservation, no matter what the parent's personal desires are in the custody case.

==== Concurrent jurisdiction ====
Concurrent jurisdiction is shared jurisdiction between the tribal courts and the state courts. State courts have been severely criticized for ignoring the requirements of the law. In all cases that the tribal court does not have exclusive jurisdiction, they have concurrent jurisdiction. These cases would include custody proceedings involving Native children who do not reside or are not domiciled on the tribal lands (such as someone born off the reservation and whose parents do not live on the reservation). In these concurrent decisions, the ICWA expresses a preference for tribal jurisdiction in Native child custody proceedings.

== Procedures ==
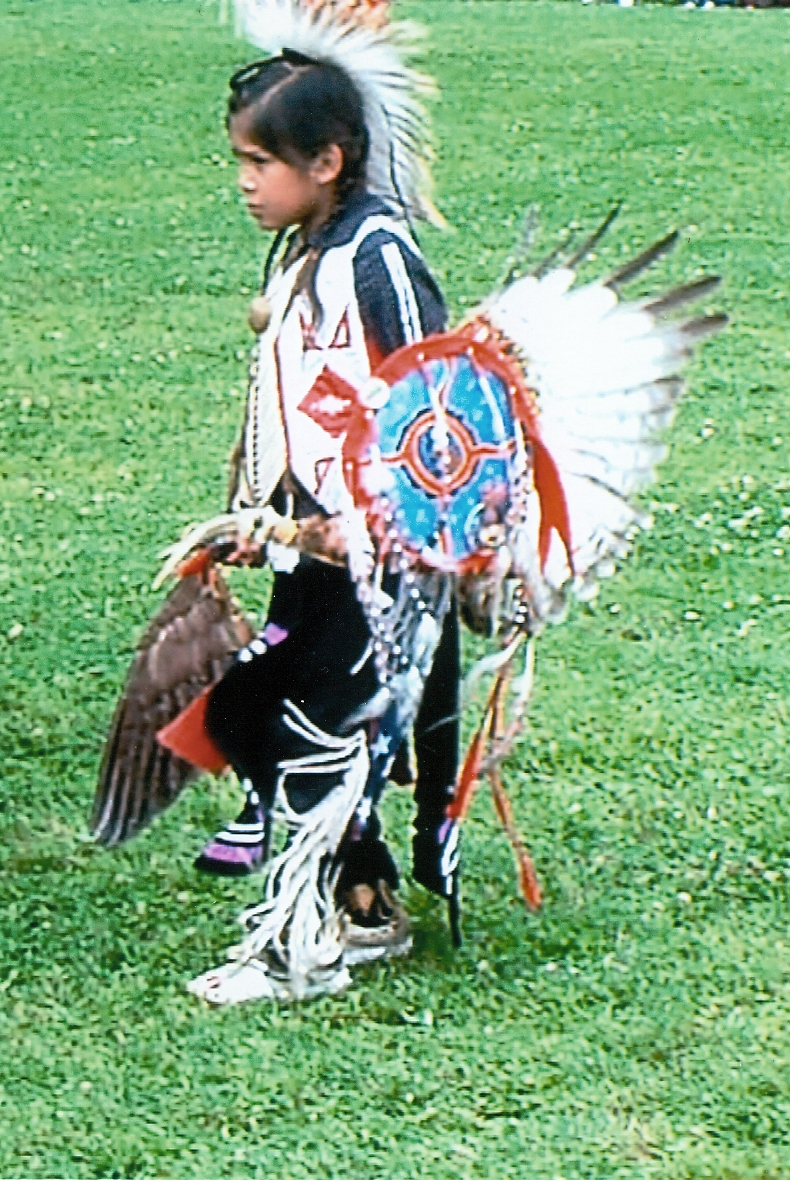
Maintaining tribal relationships

=== Notification and rights ===
In an involuntary proceeding, the party seeking the placement of the child, which is often but not always the state, must notify both the parent(s) and/or Indian custodian(s) and the child's tribe at least 10 days prior to the proceeding. Emergency proceedings may follow state law, but proceedings after that are controlled by ICWA. If the state cannot determine who the parent or the tribe is, then the state is required to notify the Secretary of the Interior. Notification must contain all the requisite information identified in 25 CFR § 23.111 and be sent by registered or certified mail with return receipt requested, and the parties notified have the right to an additional 20 days to prepare prior to the proceeding. Failure to provide such notice can cause a jurisdictional defect that may result in any such proceeding to be overturned.

The ICWA case may be dismissed for lack of due process if not for the lack of jurisdiction "because ' "failure to give proper notice of a dependency proceeding to a tribe with which the dependent child may be affiliated forecloses the participation by the tribe, [ICWA] notice requirements are strictly construed."

"The determination of a child's Indian status is up to the tribe; therefore, the juvenile court needs only a suggestion of Indian ancestry to trigger the notice requirement."

The circumstances under which a juvenile court has reason to believe that a child is an Indian child include, but are not limited to, the following: '(I) Any party to the case, Indian tribe, Indian organization or public or private agency informs the court that the child is an Indian child. (II) Any public or state-licensed agency involved in child protection services or family support has discovered information which suggests that the child is an Indian child. (III) The child who is the subject of the proceeding gives the court reason to believe he or she is an Indian child. (IV) The residence or domicile of the child, his or her biological parents, or the Indian custodian is known by the court to be or is shown to be a predominantly Indian community. (V) An officer of the court involved in the proceeding has knowledge that the child may be an Indian child.'

— Guidelines for State Courts; Indian Child Custody Proceedings (44 Federal Register 67584, 67586 (Nov. 26, 1979) (Guidelines); [former] rule 1439(d)(2).)

The MOWA Band of Choctaw Indians, a tribe that is federally recognized by the U.S. Federal Government but is not recognized for services of the Bureau of Indian Affairs under 25 C.F.R 83 et al., is used for precedent for many cases whereby the following conditions apply:

In cases whereby the mother may not be a member of the tribe, however she is eligible, then before the provisions of ICWA apply, "the trial court must initially determine if a child is an Indian child within the meaning of ICWA." This is because "a parent's current enrollment is not always dispositive of a child's membership in an Indian tribe". The finding in the case of the children involved was "In the matter of C.H. et al., 510 N.W.2d (S.D. 1993) that the MOWA Band of Choctaw Indians were held to be a Federally Recognized tribe for the purposes of ICWA.

The child may be provided an attorney, and the parents are entitled to one if they are indigent and cannot afford one. If the state does not have provisions for providing indigent parents an attorney, the Secretary of the Interior is to pay the attorney expenses.

All of the parties have the right to examine all documents and reports related to the proceeding.

In a removal case, the party seeking the removal (normally Child Protective Services or similar agency) is required to make active efforts to provide the parent or custodian with remedial and rehabilitative services designed to prevent the removal of the child from the Indian family. The "active effort" requirement also applies even if the party seeking removal is a private party, as in a private party adoption. The child may not be temporarily removed unless there is a likelihood of "serious emotional or physical damage" to the child if they remain in the home.

=== Intervention ===
The tribe and parents or Indian custodian of the Indian child have an unqualified right to intervene in a case involving foster care placement or the termination of parental rights. The intervention may be at any time, and not just at the beginning of the proceedings. This right does not apply to pre-adoption or adoption proceedings unless it also includes the termination of parental rights.

=== Transfer to tribal court ===
==== Motion to transfer ====
In a foster care or termination of parental rights case where the tribe and the state exercise concurrent jurisdiction, the tribe, either biological parent, or the Indian custodian may move to transfer the case from the state court to the tribal court. The ICWA technically allows transfer to the tribal court at any time in the proceeding, but state courts vary on how they view transfer requests after state court proceedings are well into the adjudication process. In some cases the state will look to the Adoption and Safe Families Act to deny such a transfer based on that law's time standards. After a motion for transfer has been made, there is a presumption that the tribal court will receive the case.

The state court is required to make the transfer unless one of three factors is present:

===== Objection to transfer =====
A biological parent, whether Indian or non-Indian, may object to and veto a proposed transfer of a case to tribal court. A prospective parent, the Indian child, or another party may object, but may not veto a transfer, and those objections would be covered under the "good cause" provision. In the event that a parent vetoes the transfer, the case will remain in state court. This is most commonly seen when one of the parents is non-Indian.

==== Declination by tribal court ====
The tribal court may decline to accept the transfer of a case from a state court. An example is when the parents move to transfer the case, but the tribe declines to accept jurisdiction due to a lack of funding for programs that would support the child and the parents at the tribal level but that are present at the state level. Note that a tribal court may not be a traditional tribunal, but may be any other administrative body empowered by the tribe to act on child custody matters.

==== Active remediation efforts ====
ICWA requires that active efforts be made with the existing family to rehabilitate the root cause of problems prior to removal of the child. Many tribes are focusing on intercession prior to crisis. By engaging at-risk families, and providing services, they may be able to heal the family, with a dramatic improvement in outcome for both the child and the family. The tribes focus on remediation and rehabilitative services to protect the family, and offer unique services geared to tribal values, to help parents understand their roles as parents in the culture. Early intervention and support helps caregivers and families achieve better outcomes by addressing parenting skills, addictions, domestic violence, and housing instability. Results in a study of intervention/support indicated 81% of cases preserved the existing family, or placed the child with extended family within the tribe. By working with ICWA and the tribes to create preventative services that are culturally sensitive, states can dramatically change outcomes of families who come to their attention. Such services need not be limited to tribal members, but are also available to foster and adoptive families to help them connect with the child's cultural roots.

=== Good cause ===
A state court may decline to transfer a case for "good cause", but that term is not defined in the ICWA. The BIA has issued an advisory set of guidelines for state courts to use in determining "good cause". While these guidelines are not mandatory, many states have adopted them, and they include:

- No tribal court as defined by the ICWA,
- The proceeding was at an advanced stage when the transfer request was made, and the party asking for the transfer did not request the transfer promptly after receiving notice of the proceeding,
- The Indian child is over the age of 12 and objects to the transfer,
- It would cause undue hardship on the parties and/or witnesses to travel to a tribal court, or
- The parents of an Indian child over the age of 5 are not available, and the child has had little or no contact with the tribe.

The BIA has also set out factors that state courts may not consider when determining whether good cause exists. These are binding regulations, effective as of December 12, 2016. The prohibited factors are:

- Whether the proceeding is at an advanced stage, if the Indian parent, custodian, or tribe did not receive notice of the proceeding until an advanced stage;
- Whether there have been prior proceedings involving the child in which transfer was not requested;
- Whether transfer could affect the placement of the child;
- The child's cultural connections with the tribe or its reservation; or
- Socioeconomic conditions or negative perceptions of tribal social services or judicial systems.

=== Existing Indian family exception ===
==== History of the exception ====
In 1982, the Kansas Supreme Court held that the ICWA "was not to dictate that an illegitimate infant who has never been a member of an Indian home or culture, and probably never would be, should be removed from its primary cultural heritage and placed in an Indian environment over the express objections of its non-Indian mother." Under the facts of the case, the court stated that the ICWA did not apply unless the child was part of an "existing Indian family unit," but this language was not part of the act. The court denied the Kiowa Tribe of Oklahoma the right to intervene in the case, stating that the ICWA did not apply. The court also held that even if the ICWA did apply, the trial court committed no reversible error because the non-Indian mother would have objected to the transfer of the case to a tribal court and, thus, defeated the transfer.

This case was the basis for development of a body of jurisprudence around the "existing Indian family" exception to ICWA. In the years following the Kansas Baby Boy L. case, approximately half of the states adopted or expanded upon this "existing Indian family" exception, although such language was not part of the text of the ICWA.

Subsequent to the Kansas Baby Boy L. case, in 1989, the United States Supreme Court heard Mississippi Band of Choctaw Indians v. Holyfield. 490 U.S. 30 (1989) As in the Baby Boy L. case, both parents in Holyfield consented to the voluntary termination of their parental rights and adoption of their twin infants by a non-Indian family. The unmarried parents were each Choctaw who were enrolled in the tribe. Unlike the parents in Baby Boy L., the mother in this case lived on the reservation both before and after the birth of the children off-reservation. The Supreme Court found that the children were classified as "domiciled" on the reservation because their biological mother was domiciled there. It ruled that the exclusive jurisdiction of the tribal court under ICWA should have been invoked. The case was remanded to the tribal court for a custody determination three years after the twins had been placed with non-Indian adoptive parents. Noting the potential disruption in the twins' lives, the Supreme Court said that any potential harm could have been avoided if the parents and state court had not wrongfully denied the tribe its rights under ICWA.

While the Supreme Court did not consider the "existing Indian family" exception, some sources cite Holyfield as an implicit rejection of the exception. Other sources have noted that the Holyfield case is relied upon as support for both sides of the debate over the "existing Indian family" exception:

Surprisingly, Holyfield has been relied upon by courts and parties both to support and reject the existing Indian family exception, which has been invoked in proceedings involving Indian children and families who are living off the reservation and who are, therefore, subject to state court jurisdiction concurrent with that of the tribal court.

As of 2010, Alabama, Indiana, Kentucky, Louisiana, Missouri, and Tennessee still use the "existing Indian family" exception. Alabama and Indiana have limited its application by further court decisions. Nineteen states have rejected the doctrine, either by court decision or statute.

The Kansas Supreme Court expressly overturned the Baby L. decision in In re A.J.S., stating:

Given all of the foregoing, we hereby overrule Baby Boy L. (citation omitted), and abandon its existing Indian family doctrine. Indian heritage and the treatment of it has a unique history in United States law. A.J.S. has both Indian and non-Indian heritage, and courts are right to resist essentializing any ethnic or racial group. However, ICWA's overall design, including its "good cause" threshold in 25 U.S.C. 1915, ensures that all interests—those of both natural parents, the tribe, the child, and the prospective adoptive parents—are appropriately considered and safeguarded. ICWA applies to this state court child custody proceeding involving A.J.S., and the Cherokee Nation must be permitted to intervene.

In June 2016, the Department of Interior specifically rejected the "existing Indian family" exception. The regulations reflect that courts that rejected the doctrine were correct to do so, and that "Congress did not intend to limit ICWA's applicability to those Tribal citizens actively involved in Indian culture."

==== Criticisms ====
Some critics have complained that the existing Indian family exception requires the state court to determine what it means to be an Indian child or an Indian family, by applying tests to determine the "Indian-ness" of the child. One such test involved evaluating if the child lived "in an 'actual Indian dwelling,' apparently thinking of a teepee, hogan, or pueblo." Another work notes that "state courts have taken it upon themselves to determine individuals' relationship with their tribes by examining such contacts as subscription to a tribal newsletter."

In her 1997 testimony before the Joint Hearing of the House Resources Committee and the Senate Committee on Indian Affairs, Assistant Secretary of the Interior Ada Deer (Menominee Indian Tribe of Wisconsin) stated:

... we want to express our grave concern that the objectives of the ICWA continue to be frustrated by State court created judicial exceptions to the ICWA. We are concerned that State court judges who have created the "existing Indian family exception" are delving into the sensitive and complicated areas of Indian cultural values, customs and practices which under existing law have been left exclusively to the judgment of Indian tribes ... We oppose any legislative recognition of the concept.

=== Foster care placement and adoption ===
"Foster care placement" is defined as "any action removing an Indian child from its parent or Indian custodian for temporary placement in a foster home or institution or the home of a guardian or conservator where the parent or Indian custodian cannot have the child returned upon demand, but where parental rights have not been terminated".

== Legal Challenges ==
=== Adoptive Couple v. Baby Girl (2013) ===
The US Supreme Court issued a decision pertaining to the ICWA in the case Adoptive Couple v. Baby Girl, on June 25, 2013. In a 5-4 opinion delivered by Justice Samuel Alito, the Supreme Court held that the heightened standard of deferring to tribal jurisdiction, required under § 1912(f) of ICWA does not apply when the parent in question never had physical or legal custody of the child. The Court ruled that Dusten Brown, a Cherokee man, "could not rely upon the language of a federal statute, the Indian Child Welfare Act, to protect himself against the termination of his parental rights over his daughter, Veronica, after another couple sought to adopt her." The Court remanded the case to the South Carolina State Supreme Court, which had ruled that the father should be given custody under ICWA.

South Carolina was ordered to review the facts of the case under the new standard limiting the father's rights. The Court's majority decision did not address the fact that the girl's mother, who is not Native American, had attempted to hide the proposed adoption from the father, who sought custody as soon as he learned about it. The couple seeking to adopt the girl failed to notify the father for four months after filing papers to complete the action. Brown sought to block the adoption and gain custody of his daughter, actions supported by the two South Carolina state courts that had reviewed the case. They ruled that his "waiver of his parental rights was invalid ... because the adoptive couple 'did not follow the clear procedural directives' of the federal law."

=== In re Alexandria P. ===
In 2017 the Supreme Court declined to intervene in settling jurisdiction in the case of a Choctaw girl who had been placed in foster care with a non-Indian family in California after her natural parents were unable to care for her, ending nearly six years of litigation. The couple tried to adopt the girl, in violation of state laws and the ICWA, although the state and courts had warned them that the Choctaw Nation of Oklahoma had jurisdiction and that the goal of family reunification was paramount. The couple was represented by an attorney who has challenged tribal jurisdiction in other ICWA cases. The couple refused to release the girl in 2016, despite a court order, and the state had to remove her, to much publicity.

The girl's father and other relatives had fought the adoption, and the state of California supported them and the tribe in placing the girl with Choctaw relatives. The girl was placed with relatives in Utah, who were raising two of her biological sisters.

=== Haaland v. Brackeen ===
Haaland v. Brackeen was a Supreme Court of the United States case brought by the states of Texas, Louisiana, and Indiana, and individual plaintiffs, that sought to declare the Indian Child Welfare Act (ICWA) unconstitutional. In June 2016, a 10-month-old Navajo boy was placed with Chad and Jennifer Brackeen, a former civil engineer and an anesthesiologist, respectively, after his Navajo mother (who lived in Texas) was found to be using drugs. The father of the child is Cherokee.

In 2017 a Texas state court terminated the parental rights of both the biological parents. (Note: Both the biological parents and the paternal grandmother supported the adoption by the Brackeens, but were opposed by the tribe.) Under the provisions of the ICWA, the Navajo Nation stepped in and sought to place the child with a Navajo family, but that failed and the Brackeens were allowed to adopt the child. The Brackeens later attempted to adopt the boy's sister in state court, but the girl's extended family also sought to take in the girl. The Brackeens then filed suit in federal court to overturn the ICWA on the grounds of racial discrimination. This approach would "completely erase [...] tribal sovereignty" according to Lauren van Schilfgaarde, a tribal sovereignty advocate. (Note: Lauren van Schilfgaarde (Cochiti Pueblo), is the director of the San Manuel Band of Mission Indians Tribal Legal Development Clinic at UCLA Law School.)

On November 7, 2019, the Fifth Circuit, at the request of one of the judges, ordered that the case be heard en banc. (Note: Instead of one of the parties requesting rehearing, any member of the court may request that the entire court rehear the appeal, and if a majority of the judges agree, the court will order a rehearing by the entire court. One source indicates that the plaintiffs requested an en banc hearing.) Once ordered, 486 Indian tribes, 59 American Indian organizations, and 26 states filed amicus briefs in support of the constitutionality of the ICWA. On January 22, 2020, the Court heard oral arguments. On April 6, 2021, the court issued a per curiam opinion that summarized the primary opinions of Judge Dennis or Judge Kyle Duncan. The court unanimously ruled that at least one party had standing to bring the suit, and a majority held that Congress had the authority to enact the ICWA.

Following the en banc decision of the Fifth Circuit Court, the United States, the State of Texas, the Cherokee Nation, and the Brackeens all petitioned the Supreme Court for a writ of certiorari. On February 28, 2022, the Court granted all four petitions. (Note: The other three cases were styled as Cherokee Nation, et al. v. Chad Everet Brackeen, et al.; The State of Texas v. Deb Haaland, Secretary of the Interior, et al.; and Chad Everet Brackeen, et al. v. Deb Haaland, Secretary of the Interior, et al.) The Supreme Court consolidated the other three cases into Deb Haaland, Secretary of the Interior, et al. v. Chad Everet Brackeen, et al., allotting one hour for oral argument. All four cases dealt with the same basic subject matter, but from the perspective of each individual appellant, and it is a more efficient use of the Court's time to hear them at the same time.

Oral arguments for the case were heard on November 9, 2022. Many legal experts anticipated the Supreme Court would overturn or limit ICWA in response to this case.

On June 15, 2023, in a 7–2 vote, the Supreme Court affirmed the Fifth Circuit Court's decision, upholding the ICWA in full. Justice Amy Coney Barrett wrote the opinion for the Court, reaffirming the ICWA's consistency with Congress' authority per Article I of the U.S. Constitution. Justices Clarence Thomas and Samuel Alito dissented on grounds that the ICWA infringed state sovereignty.

In the American University Law Review; Washington Vol. 72, Iss. 5, Kathryn Fort wrote "The Road to Brackeen: Defending ICWA 2013-2023 in 2015."

== Representation in popular culture ==
Barbara Kingsolver's 1993 novel Pigs in Heaven explores the aftermath of the adoption of a Cherokee child by a non-Native parent under emergency conditions. It also looks at related issues among the people of her tribe, the history of ICWA, and its effects through other characters. It also explores ICWA in terms of tribal jurisdiction over Native American children, and issues for potential adoptive parents.

== See also ==
- Adoption and Safe Families Act
- Indian child welfare laws
- Uniform Adoption Act
- Uniform Child Custody Jurisdiction And Enforcement Act
- Association on American Indian Affairs
