= Indian Adoption Project =

Initiative of the US government, 1958–1967

The Indian Adoption Project was an initiative of the United States government that led to thousands of Native American children being adopted by white families. Officially the program led by the Bureau of Indian Affairs, United States Children's Bureau, and Child Welfare League of America placed 395 Native American children with white families between 1958 through 1967. However, thousands of native children were adopted through other agencies during the same time period.

While initially seen as an exception to the standard practice of race matching during adoption, Native American advocates reframed it as a continuation of a legacy of "genocidal policies". Congress enacted the Indian Child Welfare Act in 1978 in response to stop the practice and make it harder for native children to be adopted by non-native parents.

== Legacy ==
The Indian Adoption Project was criticized by Margaret Atwood and others as "the kidnapping of indigenous children", although most children were removed from their parents care through legal process, The Child Welfare League of America continued to assist in the adoption of Native American children even after 1967 when the program was ended.

In 1978, Congressional Hearings found that "the wholesale separation of Indian children from their families is perhaps the most tragic and destructive aspect of American Indian life today," leading to the passage of the Indian Child Welfare Act.

In June 2001, Child Welfare League Executive Director Shay Bilchik formally apologized for the Indian Adoption Project saying "No matter how well intentioned and how squarely in the mainstream this was at the time, it was wrong; it was hurtful; and it reflected a kind of bias that surfaces feelings of shame."
