= Concurrent jurisdiction =

Court case jurisdiction

Concurrent jurisdiction exists where two or more courts from different systems simultaneously have jurisdiction over a specific case.

== United States ==
In the United States, state courts are presumed to have concurrent jurisdiction in federal matters, unless explicitly stated otherwise in the U.S. Constitution or in the particular federal statutory provision in issue. Concurrent jurisdiction also exists to the extent that the United States Constitution permits federal courts to hear actions that can also be heard by state courts. For example, when a party from Alabama sues a party from Florida for a breach of contract, the Alabama party can sue in an Alabama state court to the extent the defendant submits to jurisdiction, or federal court (under federal diversity jurisdiction), or in the state court located in Florida (under its personal jurisdiction over the defendant).

Concurrent jurisdiction in the United States can also exist between different levels of state courts, and between courts and other government agencies with judicial powers. Different countries can also share concurrent jurisdiction over a case, where different countries have authority over the parties or events giving rise to the cause of action.

Title 28 of the United States Code, sections 1331 and 1332 give federal courts concurrent jurisdiction with the state courts over federal question and diversity cases.

== Medieval Catholic Church ==
In the Middle Ages, the Church expanded its jurisdiction in many areas of Europe widely beyond the original scope of ecclesiastical courts concerning spiritual or religious matters, thereby creating concurrent jurisdiction in many civil cases with the courts instituted by secular authorities.

== See also ==
- Lis alibi pendens
- Original jurisdiction
- Condominium
