= List of judges of the Supreme Court of Missouri =

The following is a list of all of the individuals who have served on the Supreme Court of Missouri.

Missouri's Supreme Court had three judges from 1820 until 1872, when it was increased to five. In 1890 the number of judges was increased to seven, which is still the standard.

Only the Chief Justice is referred to as "justice" while other members are referred to as "judge." The chief justice is typically elected to a two-year term on a rotating basis by a vote of the Supreme Court judges.

| Name | County | Term as Judge |
|---|---|---|
| Mathias McGirk | Montgomery | 1821–1841 |
| John Dillard Cook | Cape Girardeau | 1821–1823 |
| John Rice Jones | Washington | 1821–1824 |
| Rufus Pettibone | St. Louis | 1823–1825 |
| George Tompkins | Howard | 1824–1845 |
| Robert Wash | St. Louis | 1825–1837 |
| John C. Edwards | Cole | 1837–1839 |
| William Barclay Napton | Saline | 1839–1849 |
| William Scott | Cole | 1841–1843 |
| Priestly H. McBride | Monroe | 1845–1848 |
| John Ferguson Ryland | Lafayette | 1849 |
| James Harvey Birch | Clinton | 1849 |
| James Harvey Birch | Clinton | 1850–1851 |
| John Ferguson Ryland | Lafayette | 1850–1857 |
| Hamilton Rowan Gamble | St. Louis | 1851–1855 |
| William Scott | Cole | 1851–1862 |
| Abiel Leonard | Howard | 1855–1857 |
| John Crowley Richardson | St. Louis | 1857–1859 |
| William Barclay Napton | Saline | 1857–1861 |
| Ephraim Brevard Ewing | Ray | 1859–1861; 1873 |
| Barton Bates | St. Charles | 1862–1865 |
| John D. S. Dryden | Marion | 1862–1865 |
| William Van Ness Bay | St. Louis | 1862–1865 |
| David Wagner | Lewis | 1865–1877 |
| Walter L. Lovelace | Montgomery | 1865–1866 |
| Nathaniel Holmes | St. Louis | 1865–1868 |
| Thomas James Clark Fagg | Pike | 1866–1868 |
| James Baker | Greene | 1868 |
| Philemon Bliss | Buchanan | 1868–1872 |
| Warren Currier | St. Louis | 1868–1871 |
| Washington Adams | Cooper | 1871–1874 |
| William Barclay Napton | Saline | 1873–1880 |
| Henry M. Vories | Buchanan | 1873–1876 |
| Thomas Adiel Sherwood | Greene | 1873–1902 |
| Edward Augustus Lewis | St. Louis | 1874 |
| Warwick Hough | Jackson | 1875–1884 |
| Elijah Hise Norton | Platte | 1877–1888 |
| John Ward Henry | Macon | 1876–1888 |
| Robert D. Ray | Carroll | 1881–1890 |
| Francis Marion Black | Jackson | 1885–1894 |
| Theodore Brace | Monroe | 1887–1907 |
| Shepard Barclay | St. Louis | 1889–1898 |
| James B. Gantt | Henry | 1891–1910 |
| John Lilburn Thomas | Jefferson | 1890–1892 |
| George Bennett MacFarlane | Audrain | 1890–1898 |
| Gavon D. Burgess | Linn | 1893–1910 |
| Waltour Moss Robinson | Jasper | 1895–1904 |
| William Muir Williams | Cooper | 1898 |
| William Champe Marshall | St. Louis | 1899–1906 |
| Leroy Valliant | St. Louis | 1899–1912 |
| James David Fox | Madison | 1903–1910 |
| Henry Lamm | Pettis | 1905–1914 |
| Waller Washington Graves | Bates | 1906–1928 |
| Archelaus Marius Woodson | Buchanan | 1907–1925 |
| Franklin Ferriss | St. Louis | 1910–1912 |
| John Kennish | Jackson | 1910–1913 |
| John Chilton Brown | Carter | 1911–1915 |
| Henry Whitelaw Bond | St. Louis | 1913–1919 |
| Charles Breckenridge Faris | Pemiscot | 1913–1919 |
| Robert F. Walker | Morgan | 1913–1930 |
| James T. Blair Jr. | DeKalb | 1915–1924 |
| Charles G. Revelle | St. Francois | 1915–1916 |
| Fred L. Williams | Jasper | 1917–1920 |
| John I. Williamson | Jackson | 1919–1920 |
| Richard Livingston Goode | St. Louis | 1919–1922 |
| Conway Elder | St. Louis | 1921–1922 |
| Edward Higbee | Adair | 1921–1922 |
| David Elmore Blair | Jasper | 1921–1930 |
| William T. Ragland | Monroe | 1922–1932 |
| John Turner White | Greene | 1923–1932 |
| Frank Ely Atwood | Carroll | 1925–1934 |
| Robert William Otto | Franklin | 1925–1926 |
| Ernest S. Gantt | Audrain | 1927–1946 |
| North Todd Gentry | Boone | 1928 |
| William Francis Frank | Adair | 1929–1938 |
| Berryman Henwood | Marion | 1930–1932 |
| George Robb Ellison | Nodaway | 1931–1955 |
| Charles Thomas Hays | Marion | 1933–1942 |
| Clarence A. Burney | Jackson | 1933 |
| Ernest M. Tipton | Jackson | 1933–1955 |
| Charles A. Leedy Jr. | Jackson | 1933–1964 |
| Walter D. Coles | St. Louis | 1935 |
| John Caskie Collet | Chariton | 1935–1937 |
| James Marsh Douglas | St. Louis | 1937–1949 |
| Raymond B. Lucas | Scott | 1938 |
| Albert M. Clark | Ray | 1939–1950 |
| Laurance M. Hyde | Mercer | 1943–1966 |
| Roscoe P. Conkling | Buchanan | 1947–1954 |
| Sidna Poage Dalton | Cape Girardeau | 1950–1965 |
| Frank Hollingsworth | Audrain | 1950–1964 |
| Henry J. Westhues | Howard | 1954–1963 |
| Henry I. Eager | Jackson | 1955–1968 |
| Clem F. Storckman | St. Louis City | 1955–1970 |
| Lawrence Holman | Randolph | 1963–1977 |
| Fred L. Henley | Pemiscot | 1964–1978 |
| James A. Finch Jr. | Cape Girardeau | 1965–1978 |
| Robert True Donnelly | Laclede | 1965–1988 |
| Robert Eldridge Seiler | Jasper | 1967–1982 |
| June P. (J. P.) Morgan | Livingston | 1969–1982 |
| John E. Bardgett | St. Louis | 1970–1982 |
| Albert L. Rendlen | Marion | 1977–1992 |
| Joseph J. Simeone | St. Louis | 1978–1979 |
| Warren Dee Welliver | Boone | 1979–1989 |
| Andrew Jackson Higgins | Platte | 1979–1991 |
| George F. Gunn Jr. | St. Louis | 1982–1985 |
| William Howard Billings | Dunklin | 1982–1991 |
| Charles Blakey Blackmar | St. Louis | 1982–1992 |
| Edward D. Robertson Jr. | Cole | 1985–1998 |
| Ann K. Covington | Boone | 1989–2001 |
| John C. Holstein | Howell | 1989–2002 |
| Duane Benton | Cole | 1991–2004 |
| Elwood L. Thomas | Clay | 1991–1995 |
| William Ray Price Jr. | Jackson | 1992-2012 |
| Stephen N. Limbaugh Jr. | Cape Girardeau | 1992–2008 |
| Ronnie L. White | St. Louis | 1995–2007 |
| Michael A. Wolff | St. Louis | 1998–2011 |
| Laura Denvir Stith | Jackson | 2001–2021 |
| Richard B. Teitelman | St. Louis City | 2002–2016 |
| Mary Rhodes Russell | Marion | 2004–present |
| Patricia Breckenridge | Vernon | 2007–2023 |
| Zel Fischer | Atchison | 2008–present |
| George W. Draper III | St. Louis | 2011–2023 |
| Paul C. Wilson | Boone | 2012–present |
| W. Brent Powell | Greene | 2017–present |
| Robin Ransom | St. Louis | 2021–present |
| Kelly C. Broniec | Montgomery | 2023–present |
| Ginger Gooch | Greene County | 2023–present |
