= William Van Ness Bay =

American judge (1818–1894)

Judge of the Supreme Court of Missouri
- In office January 1862 – June 1865 Serving with Barton Bates; John D. S. Dryden
- Preceded by: William Scott; William Barclay Napton; Ephraim Brevard Ewing
- Succeeded by: David Wagner; Walter L. Lovelace; Nathaniel Holmes

Member of the United States House of Representatives from Missouri's 2nd congressional district
- In office March 4, 1849 – March 3, 1851
- Preceded by: John Jameson
- Succeeded by: Gilchrist Porter

Member of the Missouri House of Representatives from Franklin County
- In office November 21, 1842 – December 25, 1848 Serving with William Brown (1842); Franklin P. Chiles (1844)
- Preceded by: F. R. Chiles, W. D. Hurt
- Succeeded by: C. B. Hinton

Personal details
- Born: November 23, 1818 Hudson, New York, U.S.
- Died: February 10, 1894 (aged 75) Eureka, Missouri, U.S.
- Resting place: Oak Hill Cemetery, Kirkwood, Missouri
- Party: Democratic
- Spouse: Maria Elizabeth Duncan
- Relations: Samuel M. Bay (brother); Elihu H. Bay (great-uncle)
- Children: 6
- Profession: Attorney

William Van Ness Bay (November 23, 1818 – February 10, 1894) was an American attorney and judge from Missouri. He was most notable for serving as U.S. Representative from Missouri from 1849 to 1851, and a judge of the Supreme Court of Missouri from 1862 to 1865.

== Early life ==
Bay was born in Hudson, New York on November 23, 1818, a son of Thomas Bay and Harriet (Mansfield) Bay. His grandfather John Bay and father were also prominent attorneys. Among the prospective lawyers who studied under John Bay were Ambrose Spencer, who later practiced law in partnership with him, and William W. Van Ness. Bay's great-uncle, Elihu H. Bay, was a justice of the South Carolina Supreme Court and declined an appointment to the United States Supreme Court. Bay's brother, Samuel M. Bay, was a prominent attorney in Missouri and served as counsel for Dred Scott in the 1847 Scott v. Emerson case.

== Career ==
William Bay was educated in Columbia County, New York and moved to Missouri in 1835. He studied law under the tutelage of his brother Samuel and was admitted to the bar in 1837. He settled in Union, Missouri, where he commenced the practice of law. A Democrat, in 1842 he was elected to represent the two-member Franklin County district in the Missouri House of Representatives. In 1844, he was reelected in the two-member district. In 1846, he was reelected in what was then a single-member Franklin County district, and he served from November 1842 to December 1848.

In 1848, Bay was elected to represent Missouri's 2nd Congressional District in the 35th Congress. He served one term, March 4, 1849 to March 3, 1851 and was not a candidate for reelection in 1850. In his only House speech, Bay called for the admission of California to the Union as a free state as part of the Compromise of 1850, condemned the presidential administration of Millard Fillmore, a Whig, for carrying out unpopular parts of the compromise including the Fugitive Slave Act of 1850, and pleaded with northern abolitionists not to do anything on the slavery question that would be perceived as aggressive by southern slaveholders. After leaving Congress, Bay resumed the practice of law. In 1854, he moved to St. Louis.

Bay was appointed a judge of the Supreme Court of Missouri in 1862 when the incumbent Supreme Court judges were removed after refusing to swear loyalty oaths to the Union during the American Civil War. He won election to the position in 1863 and served until June 1865, when he was removed by Governor Thomas Clement Fletcher, in keeping with a post-Civil War amendment to the state constitution which vacated all judgeships that had been filled during the war.

== Later life ==
After leaving the bench, Bay continued to practice law in St. Louis. In 1878, he authored a historical work, Reminiscences of the Bench and Bar of Missouri, which contained short biographies of Missouri's prominent attorneys, judges, and political figures.

== Retirement and death ==
Bay retired in 1886 and moved to Eureka, Missouri to live with his daughter. He died in Eureka on February 10, 1894. Bay was buried at Oak Hill Cemetery in Kirkwood, Missouri.

== Family ==
Bay was married to Maria Elizabeth Duncan (1834-1879), a native of Massachusetts. Their children included Cora, William, Frank, Harry, Harriet, and Elizabeth.

U.S. House of Representatives
Preceded by John Jameson	Member of the U.S. House of Representatives from Missouri's 2nd congressional district 1849–1851	Succeeded by Gilchrist Porter
