= Ephraim Brevard Ewing =

American judge (1819–1873)

Justice of the Missouri Supreme Court
- In office 1859–1861
- Preceded by: John Crowley Richardson
- Succeeded by: Barton Bates; William Van Ness Bay; John D. S. Dryden

Justice of the Missouri Supreme Court
- In office January 1873 – 21 June 1873
- Succeeded by: William Barclay Napton

Ephraim Brevard Ewing (1819 – June 21, 1873) was a justice of the Supreme Court of Missouri from 1859 to 1861 and from January 1873 until his death that summer.

== Early life, education, and political career ==
Born in Todd County, Kentucky, in 1819, Ewing was the son of Rev. Finis Ewing, a distinguished divine. Ewing was educated at Cumberland College, and was admitted to the bar in 1842. Ewing served as Missouri Secretary of State from 1849 to 1853, having been elected as a Democrat from Ray County, Missouri. In 1857, he became Missouri Attorney General.

== Judicial career ==
In 1859, Ewing he was elected to the Missouri Supreme Court. He was removed from the bench in 1861, along with William Barclay Napton and William Scott, for refusing to sign a loyalty oath swearing allegiance to the Union in the American Civil War. Two months earlier a strongly pro-Union provisional government seized control of the state after Federal forces occupied Jefferson City, exiling Claiborne Jackson and pro-Confederate members of the state legislature. The provisional government then set about securing the loyalty oaths of those remaining. The removed judges were replaced by the appointments of Barton Bates William Van Ness Bay, and John D. S. Dryden; all three appointees were elected to their seats in 1863.

Ewing returned to the bench in 1870, when he was elected as a judge of the St. Louis Circuit Court, and in the election of 1872, Ewing received 155,911 votes to win election as a Liberal candidate to one of two new seats established on the court. Ewing assumed office in January 1973, but died suddenly in June of that year. In the term prior to his death, he delivered a number of noted opinions, including Newmeyer v. Missouri, etc., R. R. Co., 52 Mo. 81; Pier v. Heinrichoffen, 52 Mo. 333; Ketchum v. American Express Co., 52 Mo. 390; Pacific Railroad Co. v. Cass County, 53 Mo. 17; and Straub v. Soderer, 53 Mo. 38.

== Personal life ==
Described as "tall and exceedingly spare", Ewing had "a large family, a number of whom [became] well known in public life". In July 1873, shortly after Ewing's death, his eldest daughter, Anna, married Francis Cockrell, who would go on to become a United States Senator.

Political offices
Preceded by John Crowley Richardson	Justice of the Missouri Supreme Court; 1859–1861	Succeeded by Barton Bates; William Van Ness Bay; John D. S. Dryden
Preceded by Newly created seat	1873–1873	Succeeded by William Barclay Napton
