= Barton Bates =

American judge (1824–1892)

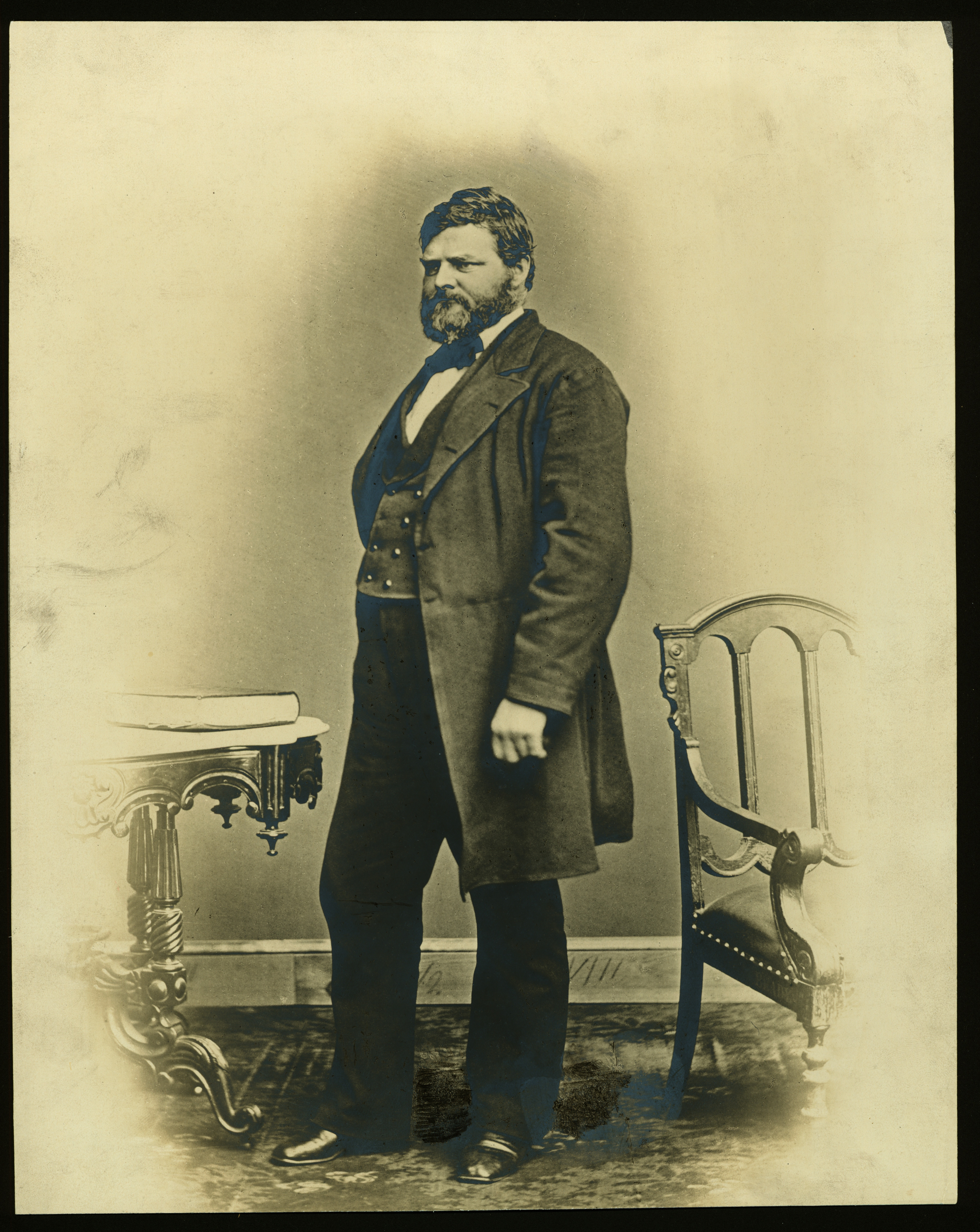

Justice of the Supreme Court of Missouri
- In office 1862–1865
- Preceded by: William Scott; William Barclay Napton; Ephraim Ewing
- Succeeded by: David Wagner

Joshua Barton Bates (February 29, 1824 – December 27, 1892) was a justice of the Supreme Court of Missouri from 1862 to 1865.

Born in St. Louis, Missouri, Bates was the oldest of seventeen children born to Edward Bates and Julia Davenport Coalter (of whom only four lived to adulthood). He was named for his father's law partner, Joshua Barton, who had been killed in a duel. As a young man, Bates "dropped the Joshua from his name and was thenceforth known as Barton Bates". On March 29, 1849, Bates married Caroline Matilda Thatcher, with whom he had ten children. They settled in Cheneaux, Missouri.

Bates was one of three judges appointed to the Missouri Supreme Court in 1862 to fill seats vacated by William Scott, William Barclay Napton, and Ephraim Ewing, who refused to sign loyalty oaths swearing loyalty to the United States during the American Civil War. The others appointed with Bates were William Van Ness Bay and John D. S. Dryden; all three appointees were elected to their seats in 1863. Bates served until his resignation in February 1865.

Bates thereafter served as a railroad president, and spent considerable time administering the will of his uncle, John Coalter, which provided for the upkeep of relatives in South Carolina rendered destitute by the war. This administration continued until the estate was exhausted in 1879. he died in Washington DC in 1892

Political offices
Preceded by William Scott; William Barclay Napton; Ephraim Ewing	Justice of the Missouri Supreme Court; 1862–1865	Succeeded by David Wagner
