= Andrew Higgins (disambiguation) =

Andrew Higgins (1886–1952) was an American shipbuilder.

Andrew or Andy Higgins may also refer to:

== People ==
- Andrew Higgins (rugby union) (born 1981), English rugby union player
- Andrew Higgins (veterinarian) (born 1948), British veterinarian and scientist
- Andrew Jackson Higgins (judge) (1921–2011), Chief Justice of the Supreme Court of Missouri
- Andy Higgins (footballer, born 1960), English football (soccer) player
- Andy Higgins (footballer, born 1993), Australian football (soccer) player

== Other ==
- USNS Andrew J. Higgins, a US Navy replenishment oiler

== See also ==
- Andrew Jackson Higgins (disambiguation)
- Andrew Wiggins (born 1995), Canadian basketball player
- Andrew Wiggin (disambiguation)
