= Sandra Sperino =

American legal scholar

Sandra F. Sperino is an American legal scholar.

Sperino earned her Master of Science in journalism at the University of Illinois, and her Juris Doctor at the University of Illinois College of Law. She served as a law clerk to Donald J. Stohr and joined the Lewis, Rice & Fingersh firm before teaching at the Temple University Beasley School of Law. Sperino later joined the University of Cincinnati College of Law as Judge Joseph P. Kinneary Professor of Law. In 2022, she was named Elwood L. Thomas Missouri Endowed Professor at the University of Missouri School of Law.

Sperino is an elected member of the American Law Institute.
