= Conway Elder =

American judge (1880–1957)

Conway Elder (1880 – December 10, 1957) was a justice of the Supreme Court of Missouri from 1921 to 1922.

Elder received his law degree from Washington University School of Law at Washington University in St. Louis, and gained Admission to practice law in Missouri in 1905. He was elected to the Missouri Senate as a Republican in 1914, and reelected in 1918. In 1920, he was elected to a two-year term on the state supreme court, but was defeated by Democrat William T. Ragland in his bid for reelection in 1922. In 1924, the Supreme Court of the United States appointed Elder to serve as a special commissioner to resolve a boundary line dispute in the case of Michigan v. Wisconsin, which was ultimately decided in 1926. Following this service, Elder returned to the private practice of law until several years before his death.

Elder died at St. Louis County Hospital at the age of 77.

Political offices
Preceded by Henry Whitelaw Bond	Justice of the Missouri Supreme Court; 1921–1922	Succeeded by William T. Ragland
