= George Macfarlane =

George Macfarlane or MacFarlane may refer to:

- George MacFarlane (1878–1932), Canadian-born American actor
- George Bennett MacFarlane (1837–1898), judge of the Supreme Court of Missouri
- George G. Macfarlane (1916–2007), British engineer and scientific administrator
- George W. Macfarlane (1849–1921), British businessman, courtier and politician of the Kingdom of Hawaii
- George Lewis MacFarlane (1854–1941), Scottish lawyer and judge
- George McFarlane, British musician, member of the bands Grand Hotel, The Quick and Giant Steps

== See also ==
- George Macfarlan (1837/38–1868), New Zealand member of parliament
