= Francis Marion Black =

American judge (1836–1902)

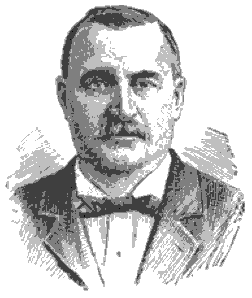

Justice of the Supreme Court of Missouri
- In office 1885–1894

Personal details
- Born: July 24, 1836; Champaign County, Ohio
- Died: May 24, 1902 (aged 65); Kansas City, Missouri
- Occupation: Jurist

Francis Marion Black (July 24, 1836 – May 24, 1902) was a justice of the Supreme Court of Missouri from 1885 to 1894.

== Biography ==
Born in Champaign County, Ohio, Black attended a county school and attended Farmer's College. Soon after gaining admission to the bar in 1864, he moved to Kansas City, Missouri, and entered into the practice of law.

He quickly developed a large law practice, and "figured prominently and creditably in a number of instances of exceedingly important litigation". His first public office was as a member of the Constitutional Convention of 1875. In 1881, he was elected circuit judge, and was elevated to the state supreme court in 1885. As a justice, his opinions were described as "concise, expressed in terse and vigorous phrases, and manifest a decided inclination to follow adjudged cases". In one case, the court considered one of Black's own previous opinions from his tenure as a circuit judge. When it came before the Supreme Court, all the judges voted to affirm except Black, who filed a brief opinion dissenting from the opinion affirming his previous decision. After his time on the court, he returned to private practice.

Black died at his home in Kansas City at a time when he was planning to step away from his excessive workload.

Political offices
Preceded by Warwick Hough	Justice of the Missouri Supreme Court; 1885–1894	Succeeded by Waltour Moss Robinson
