= William Muir Williams =

American judge (1850–1916)

William Muir Williams in 1898

William Muir Williams (February 4, 1850 – September 18, 1916) was an American lawyer who served as a justice of the Supreme Court of Missouri in 1898. He practiced law in Boonville, Missouri, for more than four decades and served as president of the Missouri Bar Association.

== Early life, education, and career ==
Born in Boonville, Missouri, to Marcus Williams and Mary J. (Howard) Williams, his father was a native of Rockbridge County, Virginia, who moved to Missouri in 1840 and engaged in several businesses, including milling, farming, and construction. Williams attended Kemper Military Academy in Boonville, and at age 17, he was appointed deputy collector of Cooper County, which position he held for approximately five years. During this period, he began reading law and subsequently continued his legal studies in the office of J. W. Draffen. He gained admission to the bar in March 1873.

Williams entered the practice of law in Boonville, and following the death of a partner in the firm of Draffen and Muir, Williams became a partner in the reorganized firm of Draffen and Williams. The partnership continued until Draffen's death in 1896, after which Williams practiced independently. He had a substantial practice before Missouri state and federal courts, which included representing International Harvester in Missouri litigation and participating in legal proceedings involving the merger of branches of the Presbyterian Church. In the later years of his career, he increasingly concentrated on appellate litigation before the Missouri Supreme Court.

In 1889, Governor David R. Francis appointed Williams president of the board of managers of Missouri's reform school for boys. He was reappointed by Governor William J. Stone and continued his involvement with the institution for the remainder of his life. A member of the Democratic Party, Williams participated in state and national party conventions, although he did not pursue an extended career in elected political office.

== Judicial service and later life ==
On January 29, 1898, Governor Lawrence Vest Stephens appointed Williams to a seat on the Supreme Court of Missouri vacated by the departure of Justice Shepard Barclay. Williams served until the expiration of the term on December 31, 1898, declining to become a candidate for election to a full term. He was succeeded by William C. Marshall, who was elected in November 1898.

Williams subsequently continued his legal practice. In 1903, he was elected president of the Missouri Bar Association, and in 1904 he served as a delegate to the Universal Congress of Lawyers and Jurists in St. Louis. He also served as a nonresident lecturer in law at the University of Missouri. In 1913, Williams was made a special counsel to Missouri Attorney General John T. Barker in a group of lawsuits alleging overcharging by railroad companies.

== Personal life and death ==
On December 16, 1875, Williams married Jessie Evans, daughter of Dr. Edwin C. Evans of Sedalia, Missouri. They had five daughters and one son. Their son, Roy D. Williams, also became a lawyer and practiced with his father in Boonville.

Williams had a younger brother, Walter Williams, who was the founder and dean of the University of Missouri School of Journalism.

Williams died at his home in Boonville at the age of 66, following an illness of several months. His death was attributed to heart failure.

Political offices
Preceded by Shepard Barclay	Justice of the Missouri Supreme Court; 1898–1898	Succeeded by William Champe Marshall
