= James A. Finch Jr. =

American judge (1907–1988)

Chief Justice of the Supreme Court of Missouri
- In office July 1, 1971 – June 30, 1973
- Preceded by: Fred L. Henley
- Succeeded by: Robert T. Donnelly

Judge of the Supreme Court of Missouri
- In office January 8, 1965 – 1978
- Appointed by: John M. Dalton
- Preceded by: Charles A. Leedy Jr.
- Succeeded by: Joseph J. Simeone

Personal details
- Born: November 13, 1907 St. Louis, Missouri
- Died: April 1, 1988 (aged 80) Cole, Missouri
- Spouse: Helen Carroll
- Education: University of Missouri School of Law; University of Missouri; Southeast Missouri State University

James A. Finch Jr. (November 13, 1907 – April 1, 1988) was a judge on the Missouri Supreme Court from 1965 until 1978, and the chief justice of that same court from 1971 to 1973. He attended public schools in Fornfelt and New Madrid, Missouri and graduated from the University of Missouri in Columbia. He served as a major in the U.S. Army Air Corps between 1942 and 1945.
