= William T. Ragland =

American judge (1866–1952)

William T. Ragland (October 5, 1866 – June 7, 1952) was a justice of the Supreme Court of Missouri from 1922 to 1933, and was the chief justice for the last two years.

== Background ==
Before becoming the Justice of the Supreme court in November 1922 be had been the Supreme Court Commissioner from 1919 for four years.

He was a Democrat, and was the chairman of the State Democratic Executive Committee.

Earlier in his career he was an assistant prosecuting attorney. After his Supreme Court position he became a senior partner in the law firm Ragland, Otto and Potter.

Ragland was born in Sharpsburg, Missouri and married Mary E. Jackson having a daughter and two sons. He attended the law department of Washington University in St. Louis, and admitted to the bar in 1889.

Political offices
Preceded by Conway Elder	Justice of the Missouri Supreme Court; 1922–1932	Succeeded by Clarence A. Burney
