= George Robb Ellison =

American judge (1881–1957)

George Robb Ellison (July 22, 1881 – July 17, 1957) was a justice of the Supreme Court of Missouri from 1931 to 1955.

Born in Canton, Lewis County, Missouri, he attended St. Paul's School in New York before graduating from Harvard College in 1904. Afterwards, he attended the University of Missouri School of Law. His grandfather, James Ellison, was a member of the Missouri State Senate and circuit judge.

In 1931, he was elected to the Supreme Court of Missouri. For three two year terms, he was elected as Chief Justice in 1935, 1942, and 1951. He retired in 1955.

In 1950, he was given an honorary degree from Culver–Stockton College. He died in St. Louis in 1957.

Political offices
Preceded by David Elmore Blair	Justice of the Missouri Supreme Court; 1931–1955	Succeeded by Henry I. Eager
