= Henry Whitelaw Bond =

American judge (1848–1919)

Henry W. Bond
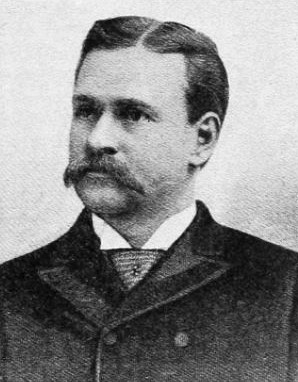

Justice of the Missouri Supreme Court
- In office 1913–1919

Personal details
- Born: January 27, 1848; Brownsville, Tennessee
- Died: September 28, 1919 (aged 71); Jefferson City, Missouri
- Spouse: Mary D. Miller (m. 1880)
- Children: 4
- Education: Harvard University
- Occupation: Jurist

Henry Whitelaw Bond (January 27, 1848 – September 28, 1919) was a justice of the Missouri Supreme Court from 1913 to 1919.

== Biography ==
Born near Brownsville, Tennessee, to Thomas and Ellen Owen (Whitelaw) Bond, He was educated in schools in Tennessee and at Harvard University. He married Mary D. Miller in Bolivar, Tennessee on November 18, 1880. They had four children: Thomas, Irene (Mrs. Alleyn von Schrader), Whitelaw and Marion.

After gaining admission to the bar in Tennessee, he practiced law there until 1879, then moved to St. Louis. In 1892, he was elected to a twelve-year term as a judge of the St. Louis Court of Appeals, beginning January 1, 1893.

He resigned on October 7, 1901, to return to the practice of law. He formed a partnership with his son, Thomas, in June 1904, and then with Judge William C. Marshall, forming the firm of Bond, Marshall & Bond. Marshall left in 1910, and the firm continued as Bond & Bond until April 11, 1911, when Bond was appointed a Supreme Court commissioner of Missouri. In 1912 he was elected to the Missouri Supreme Court for a term to run from 1913 to 1923, serving until he died in office in 1919, from "an attack of apoplexy".

Political offices
Preceded by Leroy B. Valliant	Justice of the Missouri Supreme Court; 1913–1919	Succeeded by Conway Elder
