= Edward Augustus Lewis =

American judge (1820–1889)

Edward Augustus Lewis (February 22, 1820 – September 21, 1889) was a justice of the Supreme Court of Missouri in 1874.

== Early life, education, and career ==
Born in Washington, D.C., Lewis was orphaned in 1829, around the age of nine, and sent to Charlotte Hall, Maryland, for schooling. In 1835, at the age of fifteen, he became an apprentice to the printer's trade in the office of Duff Green, and in 1836 he became a private tutor. In 1838, he was a clerk in the Government Land Office; the next year he moved to Yazoo City, Mississippi, where he gained admission to the bar in 1841. He was "a self–made and self–educated man".

In 1845, he settled in Richmond, Missouri. After serving in a number of county offices, he accepted editorial charge of the Intelligencer, a newspaper in St. Louis in 1851, where he participated in the formation of the International Typographical Union. In 1853, he entered the practice of the law in earnest, and "soon attained an enviable rank in his profession". He moved to St. Charles, Missouri, in 1856, where he "purchased 200 acres of land, which he developed into the town of New Florence, which was named after his daughter". He was a Presidential Elector twice, and the unsuccessful candidate of the minority party for the Supreme Court in 1868.

== Judicial service ==
In September 1874, Governor Silas Woodson appointed Lewis to a seat on the state supreme court vacated by the death of Justice Washington Adams, serving on that tribunal for a few months. In January 1875, Governor Woodson appointed Lewis a judge of the newly established St. Louis Court of Appeals, winning reelection the following year and presiding for nearly twelve years.

In 1888, physical infirmity and increasing deafness compelled his resignation from the bench, but his associates, in recognition of his long service, appointed him reporter of decisions. He held this position until his death in St. Louis the following year, at the age of 69.

Political offices
Preceded by Washington Adams	Justice of the Missouri Supreme Court; 1874–1874	Succeeded by Warwick Hough
