= Sharpsburg =

Sharpsburg is the name of some places in the United States of America:

- Sharpsburg, Georgia
- Sharpsburg, Illinois
- Sharpsburg, Iowa
- Sharpsburg, Kentucky
- Sharpsburg, Maryland
  - The Battle of Antietam, often called the "Battle of Sharpsburg" in the southern United States
- Sharpsburg, Missouri
- Sharpsburg, Athens County, Ohio
- Sharpsburg, Mercer County, Ohio
- Sharpsburg, Pennsylvania
- Sharpsburg, North Carolina
