= Andrew Jackson Higgins =

Andrew Jackson Higgins may refer to:

- Andrew Higgins (1886–1952), American shipbuilder
- Andrew Jackson Higgins (judge) (1921–2011), American judge

== See also ==
- Andrew Higgins (disambiguation)
