= James Harvey Birch =

American judge

James Harvey Birch (March 27, 1804 – January 11, 1878) was a Missouri politician and a judge of the Supreme Court of Missouri from 1849 to 1851.

Born in Montgomery County, Virginia, his father moved to Kentucky while Birch was still a boy. First taking up the study of medicine Birch abandoned it for the law. He moved to Missouri in 1826, where he was first employed on the editorial staff of the St. Louis "Enquirer," Senator Benton's "organ." The following year he established the "Western Monitor" at Fayette. In 1828 he was clerk of the lower branch of the General Assembly, and at the next session secretary of the upper branch of that body. In 1834 he was elected to the Missouri State Senate, taking a prominent part in its proceedings, and chairing the committee to revise the statutes of the State. He resigned before his term expired, but in 1843 accepted the appointment from President John Tyler as register of the newly established land office at Plattsburg, Missouri.

In 1848, an amendment to the Missouri Constitution vacated the offices of the judges then serving on the Supreme Court, and established a new court with judges to be appointed by the governor for twelve year terms. On January 27, 1849, Governor Austin Augustus King appointed Birch, along with William Barclay Napton and John F. Ryland, to terms on the court. Birch "felt himself out of his element on the bench", and when another constitutional amendment made the position an elected office, he did not seek re-election in 1851. He afterward accepted a second appointment as Register of the Plattsburg Land Office, which had become an important post by reason of the large influx of immigration to that garden spot known as the Platte Purchase. Birch was a candidate for a seat in the United States Congress several times, but was not successful. In 1861 he became a member of the Gamble Convention, in which he was a prominent figure by reason of his eloquence and his firm stand in favor of the Union.

Burke died at his home in Plattsburg, Missouri.

Political offices
Preceded by Newly constituted court.	Justice of the Missouri Supreme Court; 1849–1851	Succeeded by William Scott
