= Andrew Wiggin =

Andrew Wiggin may refer to:

- Andrew Wiggin (judge) (1671–1756), American judge
- Andrew "Ender" Wiggin, fictional title character in the Ender's Game science fiction novel series

== See also ==
- Andrew Wiggins (born 1995), Canadian basketball player
- Andrew Higgins (disambiguation)
