= Washington Adams =

American judge (1814–1883)

Washington Adams (1814 – May 14, 1883) was a justice of the Supreme Court of Missouri from 1871 to 1874.

== Early life, education, and career ==
Born in Christian County, Kentucky, to parents who had emigrated there from their native Virginia, the family moved to Howard County, Missouri, in 1816, when Adams was two years old. He attended the local schools, but was "more indebted to himself than to teachers for his education, which, in addition to English, embraced the usual course in Latin and Greek". He then read law for four years in the office of Peyton R. Hayden, a distinguished lawyer at Boonville, gaining admission to the bar in 1835, and establishing a successful law practice in Boonville.

== Judicial service and constitutional convention participation ==
On December 27, 1871, he was appointed by Governor Benjamin Gratz Brown to fill the seat on the supreme bench vacated by the resignation of Judge Warren Currier, and afterwards, at the election in November, 1872, Adams was elected to fill the balance of the term. He served until his resignation in October, 1874. He was also a member of the state constitutional convention of 1875, where he chaired the convention's Judiciary Committee and "played a pivotal role in the construction and framework of the State constitution". This included extending the term of service for judges of the state supreme court, and establishing a three-judge appellate court in St. Louis.

== Personal life and death ==
Adams was a member of the Episcopal church. He was married in Boonville in 1840 to Eliza, daughter of William Brown, of Cynthiana, Kentucky. They had three children. Adams died suddenly at his residence, in Boonville, of heart disease at age 68 or 69.

Political offices
Preceded by Warren Currier	Justice of the Missouri Supreme Court; 1871–1874	Succeeded by Edward Augustus Lewis
