= Warwick Hough =

American judge (1836–1915)

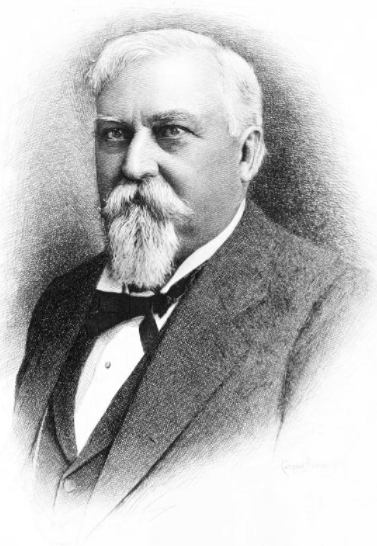

Justice of the Supreme Court of Missouri
- In office 1875–1884

Personal details
- Born: January 26, 1836; Loudoun County, Virginia
- Died: October 28, 1915 (aged 79); St. Louis, Missouri
- Resting place: Bellefontaine Cemetery
- Education: University of Missouri
- Occupation: Jurist

Warwick Hough (January 26, 1836 – October 28, 1915) was a justice of the Supreme Court of Missouri from 1875 to 1884.

== Biography ==
Warwick Hough was born in Loudoun County, Virginia on January 26, 1836. His parents brought him to Missouri the following year, and settled at Jefferson City in 1838. Hough graduated from the University of Missouri in 1854 and read law in the office of E. L. Edwards in Jefferson City, to gain admission to the bar in 1859. He was in partnership with J. Proctor Knott until 1861, when he accepted the appointment of Adjutant-General of Missouri from Governor Claiborne Fox Jackson, whom he accompanied to the South.

He served as Missouri Secretary of State under Governor Thomas Caute Reynolds, and on the staffs, successively, of Generals Polk, S. D. Lee, and Taylor. After the war, he practised law in Memphis, Tennessee, until the removal of the Test Oath in 1867 permitted him to do so in Missouri. He was elected to a ten-year term on the state supreme court in 1874, serving as chief justice for the last two years of his term. He was a circuit court judge in St. Louis from 1901 to 1907.

Hough died at his home in St. Louis from a brain hemorrhage following a seven-week illness. He was buried at Bellefontaine Cemetery.

Political offices
Preceded by Edward Augustus Lewis	Justice of the Missouri Supreme Court; 1875–1884	Succeeded by Francis Marion Black
