= James H. Birch =

James H. Birch may refer to:

- James H. Birch (slave trader) (fl. 1841), American slave trader
- James Harvey Birch (1804–1878), Missouri politician and judge
