= Henry M. Vories =

American judge (1810–1876)

Henry M. Vories (May 25, 1810 – October 29, 1876) was a justice of the Supreme Court of Missouri from 1873 to 1876.

== Early life ==
Born in Henry County, Kentucky, of German descent, Vories served as a soldier in the Black Hawk War, and attempted to make a living as a storekeeper in Indiana, at which he fared poorly, going broke several times. Vories began reading law at the age of thirty-one in the office of Oliver H. Smith, and in 1844 moved to Missouri, "poor to the point of grinding poverty, but of indomitable energy". He soon became one of the leaders of the St. Joseph Bar. He moved to San Jose, California, in 1855, remaining for two years, before returning to Missouri.

== Politics ==
On November 5, 1872, Vories was elected to a six-year term in one of several newly established seats on the Supreme Court of Missouri, but "deteriorating health plagued most of his years on the bench", ultimately forcing his resignation on October 2, 1876. He was described as "a diligent practitioner", and "an industrious judge", though one who was "prone to set out the pleadings, evidence, and instructions at great length, — a fault that has created the impression that he lacked the faculty of expressing himself concisely".

Vories died at his home in St. Joseph, Missouri, at the age of 66.

Political offices
Preceded by Newly reconfigured court	Justice of the Missouri Supreme Court; 1873–1876	Succeeded by John Ward Henry
