= Albert L. Rendlen =

American judge

Chief Justice of the Supreme Court of Missouri
- In office January, 1983 – June 30, 1985
- Preceded by: Robert T. Donnelly
- Succeeded by: Andrew J. Higgins

Judge of the Supreme Court of Missouri
- In office January 5, 1977 – April 7, 1992
- Appointed by: Christopher S. "Kit" Bond
- Succeeded by: Stephen N. Limbaugh, Jr.

Personal details
- Born: April 7, 1922 Hannibal, Missouri
- Died: November 23, 2009 (aged 87)
- Spouse: Dona Rendlen
- Education: University of Michigan J.D. University of California-Berkeley; Stanford University; University of Illinois, Champaign

Albert Lewis Rendlen (April 7, 1922 – November 23, 2009) was judge on the Supreme Court of Missouri from 1977 until 1992, and the chief justice of that Court from January 1982 until June 1985. Previously, Judge Rendlen was a judge on the Missouri Court of Appeals for the Eastern District. Before becoming an attorney, Judge Rendlen served in the United States Army and fought at the Battle of the Bulge. He was a partner in the Hannibal Law Firm Rendlen & Rendlen until appointed to the Court of Appeals. He was the chairman of the Missouri Republican Party in 1972. As a member of the commission charged with selecting nominees to the Supreme Court, Judge Rendlen was investigated for misconduct but ultimately absolved of any wrongdoing.
