= Clarence A. Burney =

American judge (1876–1933)

Clarence Alexander Burney (1876 – February 8, 1933) was a justice of the Supreme Court of Missouri for five weeks in 1933.

Born in Rantoul, Kansas, Burney received his law degree from the University of Kansas in 1897 and moved to Kansas City, Missouri, in 1000, gaining admission to the bar there. Burney practiced law in Kansas City for twenty years, until he was elected to the state circuit court in 1920. In 1932, he was elected to a ten-year term on the Missouri high court, taking office on January 2, 1933. Five weeks into his term, however, he died of a heart attack in his living quarters in the court building.

Political offices
Preceded by William T. Ragland	Justice of the Missouri Supreme Court; 1933–1933	Succeeded by Charles A. Leedy Jr.
