= Rufus Pettibone =

American judge (1784–1825)

Rufus Pettibone (May 26, 1784 – July 31, 1825) was a justice of the Supreme Court of Missouri from 1823 to 1825, appointed from St. Louis County.

== Early life, education, and career ==
Born in Litchfield County, Connecticut to Giles and Margaret Holcomb Pettibone, he was the youngest of a large family of children, and it was generally understood in the family that Rufus was to receive a collegiate education.

In 1801, he applied for and was admitted to Williams College, in northwestern Massachusetts, graduating in 1805, with high honors. In 1806, he began reading law in the office of a lawyer with a large practice, in Onondaga County, New York. He remained in this office for about two years, and then entered the office of Abraham Van Yeckten, a leading lawyer of that day in the city of Albany, in the same state. After remaining there for one year he was admitted to practice law. He settled in the village of Vernon, in Oneida County, New York, in the year 1810, and was elected in 1812 to represent the county in the New York State Assembly.

In 1817, Pettibone decided to move to St. Louis, then in the territory of Missouri, and joined a group of pioneers, arriving there with his wife and three children in May, 1818. Upon his arrival, he was offered a partnership in the practice of law by Colonel Rufus Easton, one of the most experienced lawyers then at the St. Louis bar.

== Judicial service ==
When Missouri was admitted to the union, Pettibone ran for political office on an anti-slavery ticket along with Easton, John B. C. Lucas, Robert Simpson, and Caleb Bowles. Pettibone was not elected, but Governor Alexander McNair appointed him judge of the Second Judicial Circuit, which was then composed of the counties of Ralls, Pike, Lincoln, St. Charles, Montgomery, and Callaway on the north side of the Missouri River, and Gasconade County on the south side. After his appointment, he moved to the town of St. Charles. His first court was held in Louisiana, Pike County, in February, 1821.

He served on the circuit court until 1823, when Governor McNair appointed him to a seat on the state supreme court vacated by the resignation of John Dillard Cook. In the winter of 1824 to 1825 the Legislature of the state chose Pettibone and Henry S. Geyer to revise the laws of the state. Pettibone remained on the court until his death.

== Personal life and death ==
In 1812, Pettibone married Louise Esther De Russey, daughter of Claudius Le Droit De Russey, an immigrant from France.

Pettibone died at the age of 41.

Political offices
Preceded by John Dillard Cook	Justice of the Missouri Supreme Court; 1823–1825	Succeeded by Robert Wash
