= Shepard Barclay =

American judge (1847–1925)

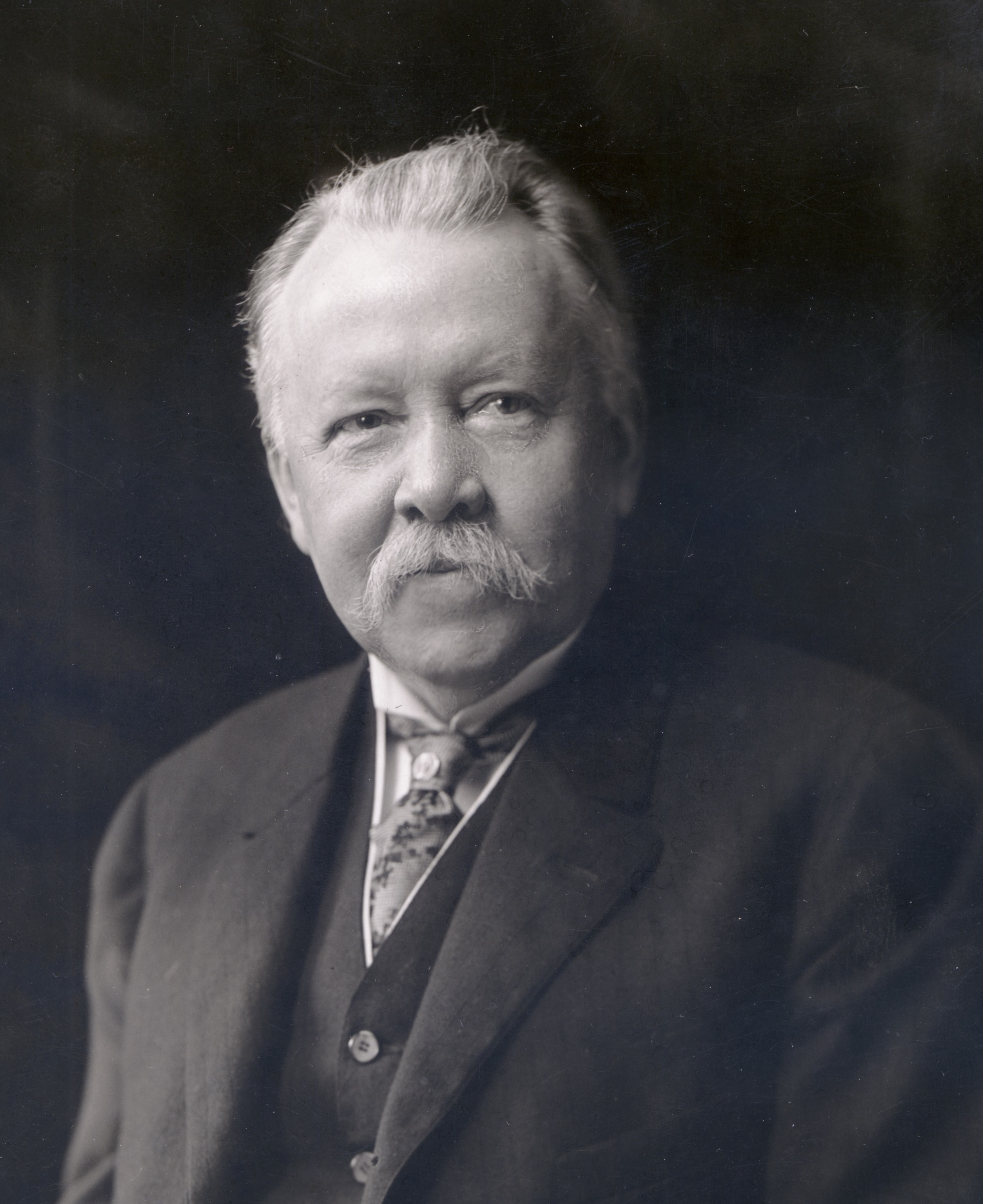
Justice Shepard Barclay

J. Shepard Barclay (November 3, 1847 – November 17, 1925) was a Missouri lawyer and judge who served as a justice of the Supreme Court of Missouri from 1889 to 1898.

== Early life and education ==
Born in St. Louis, Missouri, in "an old and prominent family of that city", Barclay was the namesake grandson of Capt. Elihu H. Shepard, a pioneer and war hero. Elihu H. Shepard directed the first studies of his young namesake and brought the latter with him to the Kaolin farm where many years of Barclay's childhood were passed. At the opening of the American Civil War in 1861, they made the entire trip to St. Louis from Kaolin on horseback together.

Following the war, Barclay's education was continued in St. Louis in the public schools and high school. He received an A.B. degree from Saint Louis University in 1867, and then attended the University of Virginia, where he completed its law program in 1869. From 1870 to 1872, Barclay attended the University of Berlin for two sessions, where he studied civil law, and also studied in Paris, gaining proficiency in the French and German languages at this time. Following his time in Europe, he returned to Saint Louis University, where he received an LL.D. degree.

== Legal career ==
In 1872 he returned home and in June of that year he began the practice of law, gaining a reputation for being "exceedingly thorough in the preparation of his cases".

He was also engaged professionally as editorial contributor upon the St Louis daily press for nearly a year after his return but retired from journalism after marrying in June 1873. By that time he had acquired considerable experience in practice, and in November 1873 he formed a partnership with William C. Marshall under the firm name of Marshall & Barclay. This firm "had a career of marked success". Barclay practiced law from 1872 to 1882.

== Judicial service and later life ==
In 1882, after having a successful practice for ten years, Barclay, then 34 years old, was nominated to a seat as a circuit judge of the city of St. Louis by the Democratic Party of St Louis. In November 1882, he was elected to that office by a majority of over 5000 — the largest of any candidate for that position for more than ten years before, and for many years after. In 1888, after six years as a circuit judge, the bar of that city strongly urged his candidacy to the supreme bench.

In August 1888, he was nominated by the Democratic convention at Springfield for a ten-year term in a seat on the state supreme court left open by the retirement of Chief Justice E. H. Norton. Barclay was elected in November "by the largest majority given any candidate on the democratic state ticket". At age 41, he was "one of the youngest judges in the history of the supreme court". He was chosen chief justice in 1897. After serving in that office for a year, he resigned in 1898, and resumed his practice.

In 1901, Governor Alexander M. Dockery appointed Barclay to a vacant seat on the St. Louis Court of Appeals; Barclay resigned that post in 1903, to return again to his practice. At that time he was a member of the firm of Barclay, Fauntelroy and Cullen. Barclay "donated much time to educational work for the benefit of young men", teaching for twenty years classes in business law in the YMCA, delivering lectures in the School of Law at Kansas City, and conducting classes in medical jurisprudence in the medical department of the St. Louis University. Barclay was also a captain of the Lafayette Guard, one of the companies of the First Regiment. N. G. M., under Col. James G. Butler, and later a member of the veteran corps of that regiment. He was vice (and acting) chairman of the war board of the Fifth District (Jefferson Hotel) during World War I.

In July 1922, Barkley was drafted as a Democratic candidate for a circuit judge position in St. Louis, but was defeated in the November election, along with all other Democratic candidates for Circuit Court seats, in a Republican sweep.

== Personal life and death ==
On June 11, 1873, Barclay married Katie Anderson, daughter of Hon. Charles R. Anderson, in St. Louis. Barclay's wife died April 15, 1924, almost a year after the celebration of their golden wedding anniversary. The following year, Barclay suffered a stroke of apoplexy in the Security National bank in St. Louis, at 5:15 in the afternoon, and died immediately, at the age of 78.

Political offices
Preceded by Elijah Hise Norton	Justice of the Missouri Supreme Court; 1889–1898	Succeeded by William Muir Williams
