= John E. Bardgett =

American judge

John E. Bardgett, Sr.

Chief Justice of the Supreme Court of Missouri
- In office July 1, 1979 – June 30, 1981
- Preceded by: J.P. Morgan
- Succeeded by: Robert T. Donnelly

Judge of the Supreme Court of Missouri
- In office April 27, 1970 – 1982
- Appointed by: Warren E. Hearnes
- Preceded by: Clem F. Storckman

Personal details
- Born: April 28, 1927 St. Louis, Missouri, United States
- Died: November 29, 2008 (aged 81) St. Louis, Missouri, United States
- Spouse: Mary Jeanne Branch
- Education: Saint Louis University

John E. Bardgett, Sr. (April 28, 1927 – November 29, 2008) was a judge on the Missouri Supreme Court from 1970 until 1982.

== Early life ==
Bardgett was born on April 28, 1927, in Richmond Heights, Missouri, to Alfred and Katherine Bardgett. He attended Little Flower Catholic Grade School, St. Louis University and the St. Louis University School of Law. Bardgett was also in the United States Navy.

== Career ==
Bardgett was a noted attorney in St. Louis and Jefferson City, Missouri. He was appointed to the Missouri Supreme Court by Governor Warren E. Hearnes in 1970. After stepping down in 1982, he returned to private practice. He remained an attorney for more than 50 years.

== Personal life ==
Bardgett married Mary Jeanne Branch in 1956. They had three children.

== Later life and death ==
Bardgett died on November 29, 2008, at the age of 81 at BJC Hospital in St. Louis.
