= Sharpsburg, Missouri =

Unincorporated community in Missouri, U.S.

Coordinates: 39°41′13″N 91°45′45″W

Sharpsburg is an unincorporated community in Marion County, in the U.S. state of Missouri.

== History ==
A post office called Sharpsburg was established in 1850, and remained in operation until 1869. The community has the name of Richard Sharp, a pioneer minister.

Justice of the Supreme Court of Missouri William T. Ragland was born here.
