= June P. Morgan =

American judge (1917–1998)

Chief Justice of the Supreme Court of Missouri
- In office July 1, 1977 – June 30, 1979
- Preceded by: Robert Eldridge Seiler
- Succeeded by: John E. Bardgett

Judge of the Supreme Court of Missouri
- In office January 3, 1969 – 1982
- Appointed by: Warren E. Hearnes

Personal details
- Born: July 12, 1917 Silex, Missouri
- Died: September 28, 1998 (aged 81) Jefferson City, Missouri
- Spouse: Emma Lee Vance
- Education: University of Missouri School of Law; Northwest Missouri State University

June P. Morgan (July 12, 1917 – September 28, 1998) was a judge on the Missouri Supreme Court from 1969 until 1982, and the chief justice of that same court from 1977 to 1979. Morgan authored a 1982 decision declaring that pension benefits accrued during a marriage are marital property, rather than the separate property of the person who earned the pension. He also wrote a 1976 decision saying it was constitutional to provide public tuition grants to college students who attended private colleges, and a 1978 decision upholding industrial development corporations, which permit low-interest financing for businesses.
