= Joseph J. Simeone =

American judge

Administrative Law Judge, Social Security Administration
- In office 1990–2007
- Appointed by: Jimmy Carter

Judge of the Supreme Court of Missouri
- In office 1978–1979
- Appointed by: Joseph P. Teasdale
- Preceded by: James A. Finch Jr.

Personal details
- Born: October 8, 1921 Quincy, Illinois
- Died: May 1, 2015 (aged 93)
- Education: Saint Louis University; Washington University in St. Louis; University of Michigan

Joseph Simeone (October 8, 1921 – May 1, 2015) was judge on the Supreme Court of Missouri from 1978 until 1979. Previously, Judge Simeone was the Chief Judge of the Missouri Court of Appeals for the Eastern District. Shortly after his appointment to the Supreme Court of Missouri, he was appointed to a position within the Social Security Administration, as an Administrative Law Judge.

== Education ==
B.S., Saint Louis University LL.B., Washington University School of Law LL.M., University of Michigan Law School S.J.D., University of Michigan Law School
