= Ginger Gooch =

American judge (born 1975 or 1976)

Judge of the Missouri Supreme Court
- Incumbent
- Assumed office November 1, 2023
- Appointed by: Mike Parson
- Preceded by: Patricia Breckenridge

Personal details
- Born: 1975 (age 50–51) Springfield, Missouri, U.S.
- Education: Stephens College (BA); University of Missouri (JD)

Ginger Kay Gooch (born 1975) is an American lawyer who has served as a judge of the Missouri Supreme Court since 2023. She served as a judge of the Missouri Court of Appeals from 2022 to 2023.

== Early life and education ==
Gooch was born and raised in Springfield, Missouri and is a graduate of Glendale High School. She received a Bachelor of Arts as a double-major in English and philosophy, law, and rhetoric in 1997 from Stephens College and a Juris Doctor from the University of Missouri School of Law in 2000.

== Career ==
After graduating law school, Gooch served as a law clerk to Judge Ann K. Covington of the Missouri Supreme Court from 2001 to 2002. From 2001 to 2022, she practiced law at Husch Blackwell, from 2001 to 2008 as an associate and from 2008 to 2022 as a partner. In October 2022, she was one of three candidates for appointment as judge to the Missouri Court of Appeals, Southern District, to fill the vacancy left by the retirement of Judge William W. Francis Jr. In 2022, she was appointed by Governor Mike Parson to serve as a judge of the Missouri Court of Appeals.

=== Missouri Supreme Court ===
In August 2023, Gooch had previously been recommended to the governor as one of three candidates to fill the vacancy left by the retirement of Judge George W. Draper III. In October 2023, Gooch was one of three candidates submitted by the nominating commission to the governor. On October 30, 2023, Governor Mike Parson announced Gooch as his appointment to the Missouri Supreme Court to fill the vacancy left by the retirement of Judge Patricia Breckenridge. With Gooch's appointment, the Missouri Supreme Court has a female majority and six of the seven seated judges are graduates of the University of Missouri School of Law.

Gooch was retained by Missouri voters in the 2024 election, and as such will serve a 12-year term on the court.

Legal offices
Preceded by Patricia Breckenridge	Justice of the Missouri Supreme Court; 2023–present	Incumbent
