= David Wagner (judge) =

American judge (1826–1902)

David Wagner (December 31, 1826 – August 4, 1902) was a justice of the Supreme Court of Missouri from 1865 to 1877.

== Life and career ==
Wagner was born in Luzerne County, Pennsylvania. He came to Missouri in 1842 and was admitted to the bar in 1848.

He practiced law until 1862, when he was elected to the Missouri Senate, and during his short tenure there "became a leading member of that body". In 1864, he resigned his seat to accept the office of judge of the circuit court, and in 1865, in turn, resigned from that position to become a judge of the Supreme Court of Missouri.

He was re-elected in 1868, and without opposition in 1870, but was defeated for reelection in 1876. He then practiced law in St. Louis, Missouri until 1880, when he retired to a suburban home near Canton, Missouri. He occasionally advised as consulting counsel, but no longer in active practice.

In 1870, Wagner published a revision of the statutes of the State, and in 1872 a supplement thereto. These publications were "admirably and systematically arranged", and until the official revision of 1879, Wagner's Statutes were "almost universally cited".

== Death ==
Wagner died in 1902, after a long illness, survived by his wife and four sons.

Political offices
Preceded by Barton Bates	Justice of the Missouri Supreme Court; 1865–1877	Succeeded by Elijah Hise Norton
