= John Dillard Cook =

American judge (1792–1852)

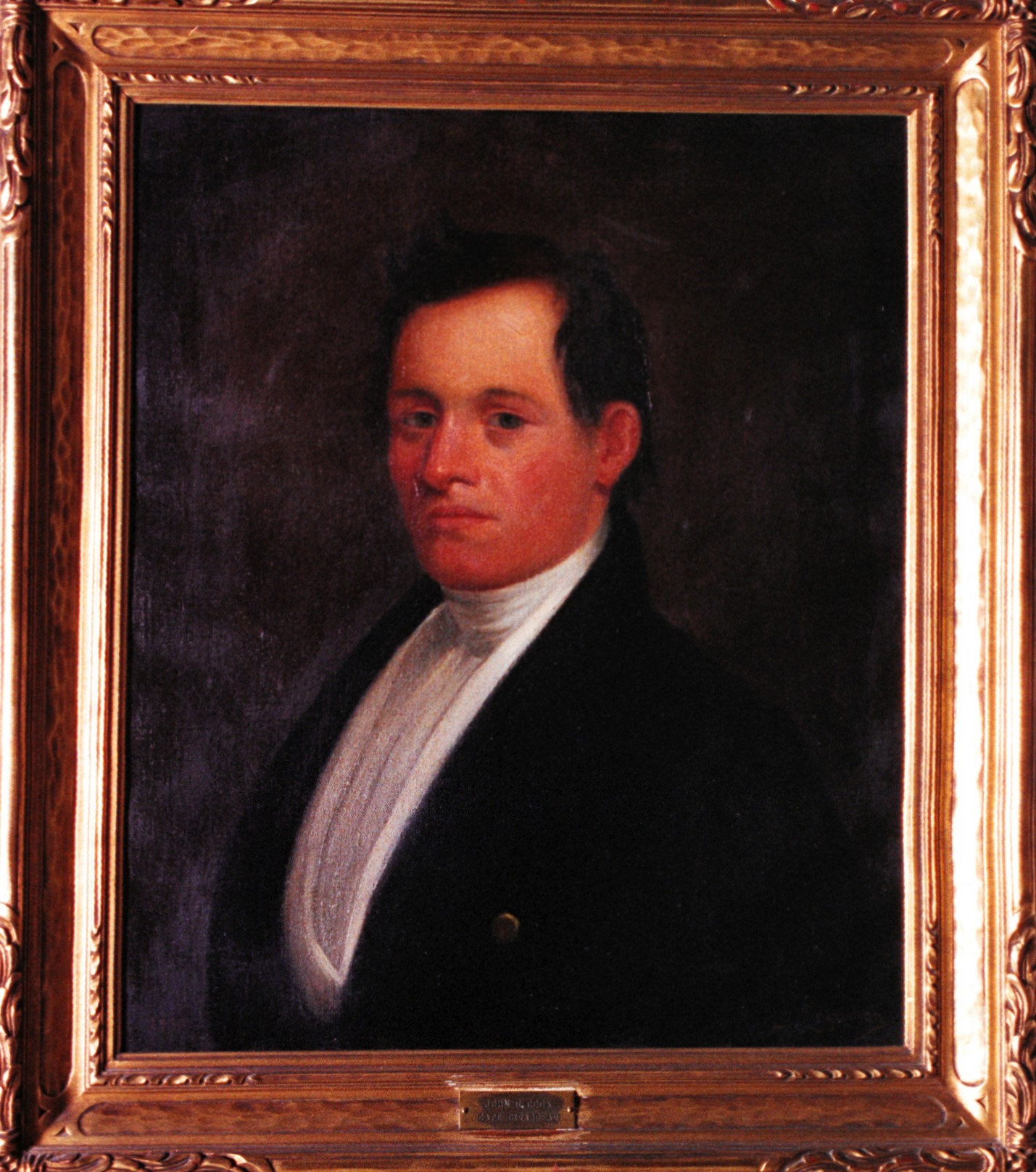
A 1930 portrait of Cook.

John Dillard Cook (1792 – 1852) was a justice of the Supreme Court of Missouri from November 1820 to May 1823.

Born in Virginia, Cook read law with a Frankfort, Kentucky, lawyer to gain admission to the bar. Cook moved Missouri during territorial days, and was a member of the convention which framed the state's first constitution. He served as judge of the Supreme Court for two years before resigning to accept an appointment to the state circuit court. Cook was one of the first three judges appointed to the Missouri Supreme Court, following the admission of the state to the Union. An account of his time on the supreme court states:

His tastes led him to prefer nisi prius service, in which he achieved high distinction. He is remembered as a thorough master of the common law, but greatly lacking in industry and application. He was genial in disposition, and charitable to the point of prodigality.

He lived in Cape Girardeau County, Missouri, and died there around the age of 60.

Political offices
Preceded by Newly constituted court	Justice of the Missouri Supreme Court; 1821–1823	Succeeded by Rufus Pettibone
