= Samuel M. Bay =

American lawyer

Missouri Attorney General
- In office 1839–1845
- Appointed by: Governor Lilburn Boggs

Personal details
- Born: Samuel Mansfield Bay; June 1, 1810 Hudson, New York, United States
- Died: May 29, 1849 (aged 38)
- Relatives: William Van Ness Bay (brother); Dr. Joseph Lovell (uncle)

Samuel M. Bay (June 1, 1810 – May 29, 1849) was an American lawyer who represented Dred Scott in the 1847 Scott v. Emerson case. He was known for his prosecution of Dedimus Buell Burr, who had put ground glass in his ill wife's food over time. He practiced law in Jefferson and St. Louis, Missouri. Bay served in the Missouri Legislature beginning in 1836 and was appointed as Missouri Attorney General from 1839 to 1845.

His father and grandfather were attorneys and his uncle Dr. Joseph Lovell, was surgeon-general of the United States Army. He studied under Salmon P. Chase, who was later secretary of the treasury under President Abraham Lincoln, and chief justice of the Supreme Court.

== Early life ==
Samuel Mansfield Bay was born in Hudson, New York in 1810. He attended Hudson Academy, where he studied Latin, Greek, and math. Bay's father and grandfather were both lawyers. His father was a contemporary of Martin Van Buren and his grandfather worked at the firm of Ambrose Spencer, who was a judge on the Supreme Court of New York for many years. Samuel Bay had a brother, William Van Ness Bay.

Bay often visited his uncle, Joseph Lovell in Washington, D.C., who was surgeon-general of the United States Army. Bay stayed in Washington for about two years, where he attended a private school and was taught by Salmon P. Chase. Chase held many political offices, including governor of Ohio, United States senator, secretary of the treasury under President Lincoln, and chief justice of the Supreme Court.

After finishing school, Bay returned to New York and became a clerk in a large French importing house. The firm sent him to Europe on business for five or six months. While away, Bay decided to study law.

== Legal career ==
When Bay returned to the United States from Europe, he traveled to Ohio, where Judge Swayne, a Supreme Court Justice, asked Bay to read law (study) with him in his office. Shortly after his return he also visited Columbia, South Carolina, where he met his grand-uncle, Judge Elihu H. Bay who spent forty-nine years as a judge on the South Carolina Supreme Court. President Jefferson offered Judge Bay a seat on the United States Supreme Court, but he declined. According to Bay's brother William, Samuel Bay's visit with his uncle strongly influenced his desire to become an attorney.

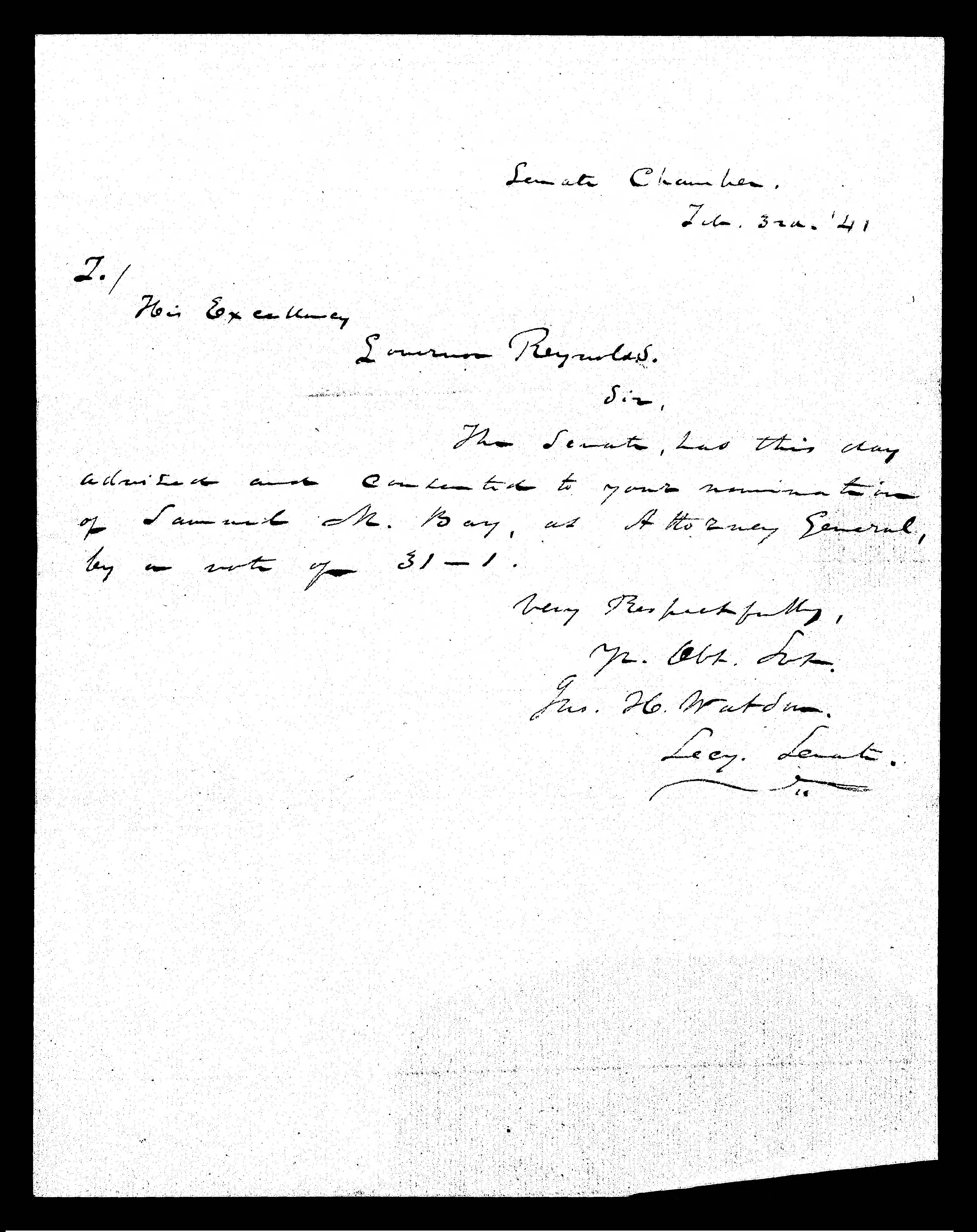
Senate election of Samuel Mansfield Bay as attorney general. February 3, 1841. Courtesy of the Missouri State Archives.

After completing his studies, Bay moved to Union, Missouri. He was elected to the Missouri Legislature in 1836. When his term in the legislature ended, Bay moved to Jefferson City, where he established a law practice. He was appointed to the position of Missouri attorney general by Governor Boggs. Bay held the position of attorney-general from 1839 to 1845.

Bay earned a wide reputation for his prosecution of Dedimus Buell Burr (1813-1842), who was convicted and executed for the murder of his wife Sally. Sally, Burr's third wife, had fallen ill and died after suffering from a fever for several weeks. Doctors were unable to explain the illness, but there was no suspicion of foul play until one of Burr's apprentices in his blacksmith shop said he believed Burr had been putting pounded glass in his wife's medicine, eventually killing her. Although the funeral procession for Burr's wife was already underway, the body was returned to the city for a post mortem examination, where the examiner found a large quantity of pulverized glass in the woman's stomach. Burr was arrested, but many thought he would be acquitted. Bay found that Burr refused to have anyone else administer medicine to his wife and had also had two previous wives die under similar conditions. The defense could not overcome this argument and Burr was convicted. Before being executed, Burr admitted that he was guilty of this murder and the other two and said he was simply tired of each wife and wanted another.

Bay had a partnership with Abiel Leonard in Jefferson City until 1846 or 1847. Around that time, Bay moved the practice to St. Louis and was appointed attorney for the State Bank.

=== The Dred Scott case ===
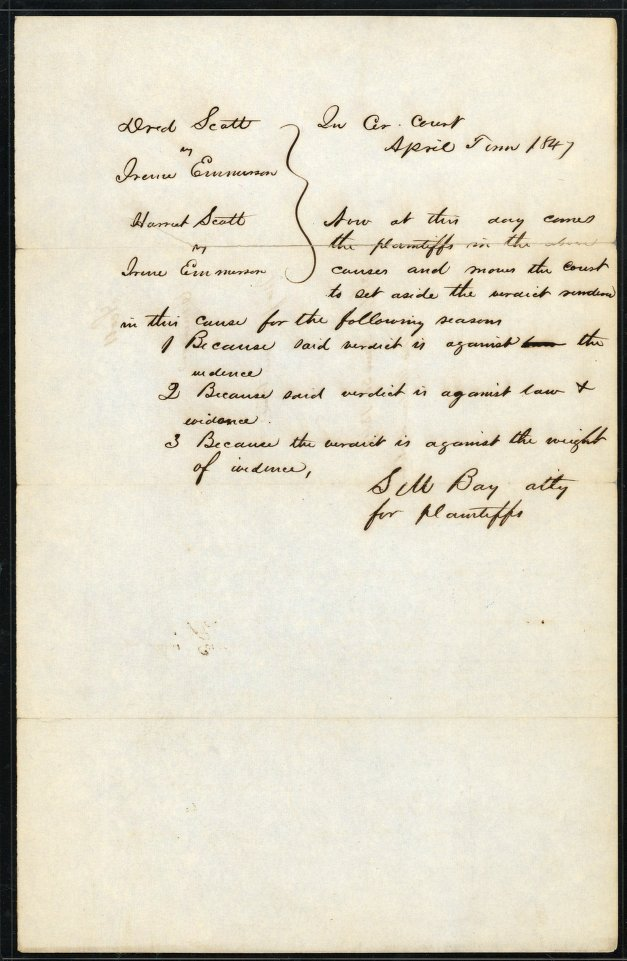
Irene Emerson vs. Dred Scott (of color). March Term 1848. Motion for New Trial. S.M. Bay attorney for plaintiffs.

In 1847, Dred Scott made his first legal contest for freedom in St. Louis, Missouri. Judge Alexander Hamilton presided over the case and Samuel M. Bay acted as Scott's attorney. Francis B. Murdoch was the Scotts' original attorney and filed three suits against Irene Emerson, Dred and Harriet's former owner for trespass and false imprisonment. Murdoch was replaced by Charles D. Drake. More than a year passed from the time of Scott's first petition filed with the court and by the time the case was ready for trial, Drake had left St. Louis, in May or June 1847. Drake prepared the case, but Bay handled the proceedings in court.

To argue his case, Bay needed to prove that Scott had been taken into a free state and that he was presently a slave owned by Irene Emerson. Bay established that Scott had been a slave taken into free territory, brought back to Missouri, and was being held there as a slave. Testimony attested to this fact, establishing that Scott was Irene Emerson's slave in Missouri and had accompanied her to Forts Armstrong and Snelling. It was also established in testimony that Mrs. Emerson still claimed Scott as her slave in Missouri. Bay thought at this point he had all the evidence to secure Scott's freedom. However, the defense argued that Scott had not legally proven that Mrs. Emerson was claiming him as a slave. During cross examination of Samuel Russell, who had testified that he hired Scott from Mrs. Emerson, thus establishing her ownership of Scott, Russell admitted that it was in fact his wife who had hired Scott. Russell's testimony was dismissed as hearsay. The Scotts lost their case. Irene Emerson was allowed to keep Dred and Harriet as slaves because no one could prove that they were her slaves.

Bay moved immediately for a new trial on the basis that Scott's case had been lost due to a technicality which could be rectified, rather than the facts. On July 24, 1847, Bay filed a deposition detailing the differences between Russell's deposition and his testimony under cross-examination, and a new trial was eventually awarded. But due to an appeal by Emerson, the St. Louis Fire of 1849, a cholera epidemic, and two continuances, the retrial in the St. Louis Circuit Court did not commence until January 12, 1850, by which time Bay had died in the cholera epidemic. The jury in the new trial decided in favor of Scott and awarded him his freedom, but the case was appealed, with eventual results that are well-known.

Although the Dred Scott case is well known today, Dred Scott v. Irene Emerson did not incite much reaction in St. Louis or any other part of the country. The litigants involved were not well known, nor did the case involve controversial principles of law. Only one St. Louis newspaper mentioned the case, and only in a daily list of cases in the city courts.

== Later life and death ==
Bay died relatively young and was survived by a widow, three sons, and a daughter. He died of cholera in the 1849 epidemic.
