= Patricia Breckenridge =

American judge (born 1953)

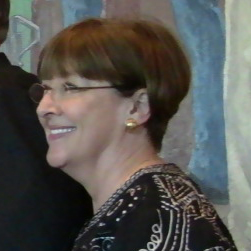

Chief Justice of Missouri
- In office July 1, 2015 – June 30, 2017
- Preceded by: Mary Rhodes Russell
- Succeeded by: Zel Fischer

Judge of the Supreme Court of Missouri
- In office September 2007 – October 14, 2023
- Nominated by: Matt Blunt
- Preceded by: Ronnie L. White
- Succeeded by: Ginger Gooch

Personal details
- Born: October 14, 1953 (age 72) Nevada, Missouri, U.S.
- Spouse: Bryan C. Breckenridge
- Education: University of Arkansas (no degree); University of Missouri (BS, JD)

Patricia Breckenridge (born October 14, 1953) is a former judge of the Supreme Court of Missouri. She was first appointed to the court in 2007 and served as chief justice from July 1, 2015, to June 30, 2017. Breckenridge was the fourth woman to be appointed to the high court.

During her tenure as chief justice, Breckenridge led the court to establish the committee on practice and procedures in municipal division cases, the task force on criminal justice, the commission on racial and ethnic fairness, the commission on civil justice reform, and the partnership for child safety and well-being. She also led the adoption of uniform standards for Missouri juvenile officers.

Breckenridge served on all of these committees as well as the family court committee and numerous other state and national committees. Breckenridge is also a member of several professional organizations including the Missouri Bar, the American Bar Association, and the National Association of Woman Judges.

Breckenridge was selected as the 2017 Woman of the Year by Missouri Lawyers Media which praised her commitment to the integrity of the justice system and the reform of its shortcomings. In 2019, Breckenridge was recognized by the National Center for State Courts by receiving the Distinguished Service Award for appellate judges. In 2020, she was awarded a Theodore McMillian Judicial Excellence Award from The Missouri Bar, for setting an example of judicial excellence; leading the advancement of justice; providing outstanding public and community service to the people of Missouri; demonstrating the highest character, integrity, and honor; and inspiring other members of the judiciary to similar noble purpose.

== Background ==
Breckenridge was born in Nevada, Missouri, and received her undergraduate (BS in agricultural economics with honors) and law degrees from the University of Missouri. After working at a Nevada law firm for four years, in 1982 Breckenridge was appointed as an associate circuit judge in Vernon County, Missouri. She was subsequently elected to the position three times. She was then elevated to the Missouri Court of Appeals in 1990, and she was retained twice in general elections.

Breckenridge was retained in office as a Supreme Court judge in 2008 by 73 percent of Missouri voters after the Missouri Bar statewide judicial performance review committee recommended she be retained. The committee noted her opinions were “well-reasoned and organized, clearly written, and closely adhere to precedent as well as constitutional and statutory law.” In 2020, the judicial performance review committee stated Breckenridge “substantially meets” overall judicial performance standards after a survey of Missouri lawyers gave her ratings between 4.29 and 4.82 on a five-point scale for all fourteen qualities surveyed.

== See also ==
- List of female state supreme court justices

Legal offices
Preceded by Mary Rhodes Russell	Chief Justice of the Supreme Court of Missouri; 2015–2017	Succeeded by Zel Fischer
Preceded by Ronnie L. White	Judge of the Supreme Court of Missouri; 2007–2023	Succeeded by Ginger Gooch
