= Robert Eldridge Seiler =

American judge

Robert E. Seiler

Chief Justice of the Supreme Court of Missouri
- In office July 1, 1975 – June 30, 1977
- Preceded by: Robert T. Donnelly
- Succeeded by: J.P. Morgan

Judge of the Supreme Court of Missouri
- In office January 3, 1967 – 1982
- Appointed by: Warren E. Hearnes

Personal details
- Born: December 5, 1912 Kansas City, Kansas
- Died: April 13, 1998 (aged 85)
- Spouse: Faye Poore
- Education: University of Missouri School of Law; University of Missouri

Robert E. Seiler (December 5, 1912 – April 13, 1998) was a judge on the Missouri Supreme Court from 1967 until 1982, and the chief justice of that same court from 1975 to 1977. He attended the University of Missouri in Columbia. He served in the U.S. Army from 1942 until 1945.
