= George Bennett MacFarlane =

American judge (1837–1898)

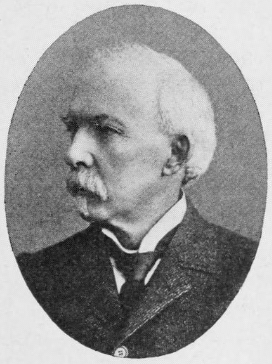

Judge of the Supreme Court of Missouri
- In office 1890–1898

Personal details
- Born: January 21, 1837 Callaway County, Missouri
- Died: February 12, 1898 (aged 61) St. Louis, Missouri
- Spouse: Alice F. Orear (m. 1868)
- Education: Westminster College
- Occupation: Lawyer

George Bennett MacFarlane (January 21, 1837 – February 12, 1898) was a judge of the Supreme Court of Missouri. He was appointed to the court by Governor D.R. Francis in 1890 and served a two-year term. In the general election of 1892, MacFarlane was elected to the position for a term of ten years. However, MacFarlane only served eight years, until his death in 1898.

== Early life ==
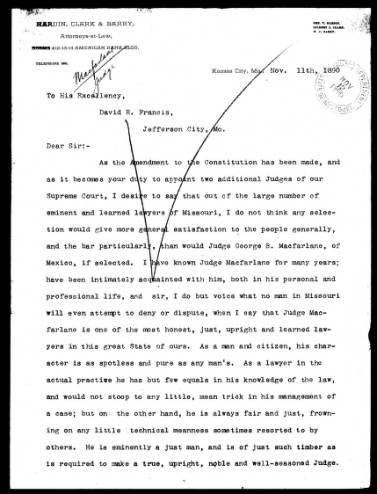
Letter, from Benjamin Thomas Hardin, Kansas City, Jackson County to David Rowland Francis, November 11, 1890 recommending George Bennett MacFarlane for the Missouri Supreme Court. Missouri State Archives.

MacFarlane was born in Callaway County, Missouri, on January 21, 1837, to George and Catherine Bennett. MacFarlane's father was also named George and was born in Ayrshire, Scotland, in 1796. After immigrating to America, he met and married Catherine, who was from Kentucky. George Sr. was a teacher in his early adulthood and was also a farmer. He died in 1866, as MacFarlane was embarking on his law career.

He attended the district school and later enrolled at Westminster College in Fulton, Missouri. After graduating, he became a teacher, while studying the law on nights and weekends. He completed his law studies at the firm of Henry C. Hayden in Fulton. MacFarlane was admitted to the bar of his county in 1861, the same year the Civil War began. MacFarlane was "a Union man, because he thought secession unwise", and therefore took no part in the war. With the start of the war, he deferred his plans to begin his law career and instead resumed teaching and working on his family's farm.

== Law and political career ==
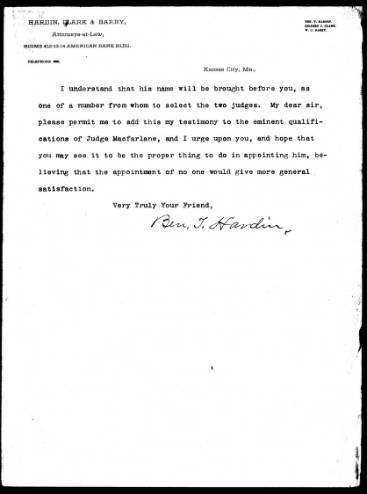
Letter, from Benjamin Thomas Hardin, Kansas City, Jackson County to David Rowland Francis, November 11, 1890 recommending George Bennett MacFarlane for the Missouri Supreme Court. Missouri State Archives.

After the war, MacFarlane moved to Rushville in Schuyler County, Illinois, to practice law, but was not successful. In 1865, MacFarlane moved to Mexico, Missouri, and opened his own law practice. He soon took on a partner, J. McD. Trimble of Kansas City, and the two remained law partners for twelve years. This practice was very successful, and MacFarlane was the lawyer for two railroad companies.

The first political office that MacFarlane elected to was Justice of the Peace, which he held for two years, starting in 1866. He then was elected to City Recorder, an office he also held for two years. MacFarlane was appointed to a Probate Judgeship of Audrain County by Governor Benjamin Gratz Brown during the governor's first term. When MacFarlane's term expired, he was re-elected to that position in 1874. MacFarlane only served as a judge for another year before going back to his law practice. He worked as a lawyer until 1890 when he was called back to public service. MacFarlane also served as a school director and helped to improve the public schools in his area.

In 1890, a constitutional amendment was passed increasing the number of judges on the Missouri Supreme Court from five to seven. MacFarlane was asked to fill this spot by Governor David Rowland Francis. MacFarlane's term was up in 1892, but he was re-elected as a judge by the people of Missouri. MacFarlane was elected for a ten year term, but died only six years later.

== Personal life and death ==
MacFarlane married Alice F. Orear in 1868. She came from a notable family from Boone County. The two had six children, but lost three. Two died in infancy and their son, William Lawrence, died in 1895, when he was only 16. The couple had three other sons, Charles R., George Locke, and Guy Orear.

MacFarlane died in St. Louis on February 12, 1898, after a severe illness. He was buried in Mexico, Missouri.
