= Mathias McGirk =

American judge

Mathias McGirk (1790–1842) of Montgomery County, Missouri, was a justice of the Missouri Supreme Court from 1821 to 1841.

Born in Tennessee, McGirk studied law there before moving to St. Louis around 1814. he served in the Territorial Missouri General Assembly, where in 1816 he was the author of the bill to introduce the common law to Missouri. The bill "passed as he framed it, and many other important statutes were introduced and passed of which he was the author".

He was thereafter appointed as one of the first three judges of the state supreme court in 1821. His colleagues were John D. Cook and John Rice Jones, and their commissions issued in 1820.

McGirk relocated to Montgomery County around 1827 or 1828. He "practiced in all the courts of that circuit, and his name appears among those who attended court in old Franklin". Shortly after moving to Montgomery County he married Elizabeth Talbott, from an old and influential family there.

He authored Rachel v. Walker, 4 Mo. 350 (1836), which freed an enslaved woman who had been taken to free territory by an Army officer. Walker was an important predecessor to the Dred Scott case. Mathias' brother, Isaac McGirk, represented Marguerite Scypion in her claim for freedom in the Missouri courts in 1805. An 1892 biography provided this sketch:

When Governor McNair selected the first Chief-Justice of the Supreme Court of Missouri, he set the worthy example of eschewing political considerations. Although a disciple of Thomas Jefferson, he chose one who belonged to the school now remembered as Old Line Whigs. Judge McGirk was born in Tennessee in 1790, came to St. Louis about 1814, but soon removed to Montgomery County in the interior of the State. He was appointed to his high position at the early age of thirty-one, and filled it admirably and well for twenty years. Prior to his appointment, he had served in the Territorial Legislature, and was the author of a number of the important statutes enacted by it, notably the one introducing the common law of England into the local jurisprudence. He is described to have been inclined to corpulency and of medium height. His strong sense of right, vigorous intellect, and courteous demeanor made him a popular judge. His opinions are clear and to the point, and many of them discuss questions of grave importance. In differing from his associates upon the nature of the legislation under which loan-office certificates were issued, holding that, in the light of the Constitution of the United States, they were bills of credit, he expressed the views which received the sanction of the Federal Supreme Court in the well-known case of Craig v. Missouri, 4 Peters, 410. His tastes were domestic and for the country. At his handsome home on Loutre Island in the Missouri River, he was hospitable to his friends, and drank deep of the sober pleasures of a full, rounded life. He retired upon his resignation in 1841, in the full possession of all his faculties, and beloved of all his fellow-citizens.

McGirk was fond of agriculture, and built what was described as "a beautiful residence" on or near Lautre Island, one of the islands of the Missouri River, near the present town of Hermann, Missouri.

Another biography described McGirk as follows:

He was a man of medium size, about five feet ten, and somewhat inclined to corpulency. He was not favored with a classical education, and his reading, outside of the law, was not extensive. There was no brilliancy about him, but he had good, practical sense, with a naturally strong and vigorous intellect, and a fine, retentive memory, which enabled him to gather a large amount of legal learning. He was not at the bar long enough to build up a reputation as a practitioner. When he had his friends about him he was disposed to be humorous, but among strangers was very reticent.

Judge McGirk remained on the bench until 1841, and was, during most of his judicial services, presiding justice. As a jurist he grew rapidly in reputation and public favor, and was always popular with the bar. His opinions will be found in the first six volumes of our Reports, and will compare favorably with those of any other judge of his time.

His language was strong, concise, vigorous, and terse, and remarkably free from doubt and ambiguity. There was nothing stiff or strained in his diction, nor did it show any indication of having been studied or measured. He was a fluent conversationalist, and wrote as he spoke. In examining his published opinions the reader will look in vain for anything like studied phraseology or verbiage. His style is easy, flowing, and natural, and in perfect harmony with his thoughts and reflections.

It has been stated, by those who had the means of knowing, that he seldom rewrote an opinion, nor did his original draft contain many changes or alterations.

In politics he was an Old-Line Whig, very decided in his views, and probably would have been very active but for the restraint imposed by his official position. The only public positions he held were those of judge of the Supreme Court and member of our Territorial Legislature.

Among the able men of our state who studied law under him is the Hon. John D. S. Dryden, late judge of our Supreme Court, who speaks in the highest terms of Judge McGirk's probity and judicial learning.

McGirk had one Daughter, Lane Eliza (1820-1825). His widow Elizabeth Talbot (1787-September 12 1844) survived him by many years.They are all 3 buried near the site of the original home roughly 0.5 miles east of Rhineland, MO.
