= Kelly C. Broniec =

American judge (born 1970 or 1971)

Kelly Broniec

Judge of the Missouri Supreme Court
- Incumbent
- Assumed office September 25, 2023
- Appointed by: Mike Parson
- Preceded by: George W. Draper III

Personal details
- Born: 1971 (age 54–55)
- Party: Republican
- Education: William Woods University (BA); University of Missouri (JD)

Kelly Christine Broniec (born 1971) is an American lawyer from Missouri who was appointed by Governor Mike Parson to serve as a judge of the Missouri Supreme Court in September 2023. She previously served as a judge of the Missouri Court of Appeals from 2020 to 2023, and as chief judge July to September 2023.

== Education ==
Broniec obtained a Bachelor of Arts in business administration from William Woods University in 1992 and a Juris Doctor from University of Missouri School of Law in 1996.

== Career ==
After graduating law school, she served in private practice at the law office of Michael S. Wright from 1996 to 1998, while simultaneously serving as the assistant prosecuting attorney for Warren County. From 1998 to 1999, she served as the assistant prosecuting attorney, Lincoln County. From 1999 to 2006, she was the prosecuting attorney of Montgomery County. In 2006, she was appointed by Governor Matt Blunt to serve as an associate circuit judge for Montgomery County and served until her elevation to the court of appeals in 2020. On October 19, 2020, she was appointed by Governor Mike Parson to serve as a judge of the Eastern District of the Missouri Court of Appeals to fill the vacancy left by the retirement of Judge Roy L. Richter.

On June 29, 2023, she was elected to serve as chief judge of the Missouri Court of Appeals for term starting on July 1, 2023. She was succeeded as chief judge by Thomas C. Clark II on September 25, 2023.

=== Missouri Supreme Court ===
In August 2023, Broniec was one of three candidates submitted to the governor for appointment to the Missouri Supreme Court. On September 12, 2023, Broniec was appointed to the Missouri Supreme Court by Governor Mike Parson to fill the vacancy left by the retirement of Judge George W. Draper III. At the time of Broniec's appointment, that gave the Missouri Supreme Court a female majority.

In 2024, Broniec voted against allowing the initiative to legalize abortion and women's reproductive rights to appear on state-wide ballots for the November 2024 election. She was part of the dissenting opinion in the 4-3 ruling.

Broniec was retained by Missouri voters in the 2024 election, and as such will serve a 12 year term on the court.

== Personal life ==
Broniec is married to her husband, Mark and they have two daughters.

Legal offices
Preceded by George W. Draper III	Justice of the Supreme Court of Missouri; 2023–present	Incumbent
