= Andrew Wiggin (judge) =

American politician (1671–1756)

Andrew Wiggin (1672–1756) was born in Squamscott, a section of Exeter now Stratham, January 6, 1672. He was a grandson of Governor Thomas Wiggin, the first governor of the Upper Plantation of New Hampshire, which later became the Province of New Hampshire.

It was through Wiggin's efforts that the town of Stratham was incorporated. Wiggin was representative for Stratham in the New Hampshire House of Representatives for many years, and was repeatedly Speaker of the House from 1728 onwards.

Wiggin was a judge of the Superior Court of New Hampshire from 1729 to 1732 although he only sat on the bench for three terms, beginning with September term, 1729. Wiggin was appointed Judge of Probate in 1742, and served in the office till 1756.

Andrew Wiggins was married to Abigail Follett in Dover, New Hampshire September 2, 1697.
