= Elwood L. Thomas =

American judge

Judge of the Supreme Court of Missouri
- In office October 1, 1991 – July 30, 1995
- Appointed by: John Ashcroft
- Preceded by: Andrew Jackson Higgins
- Succeeded by: Ronnie L. White

Personal details
- Born: July 24, 1930 Council Bluffs, Iowa, U.S.
- Died: July 30, 1995 (aged 65) Jefferson City, Missouri, U.S.
- Spouse: Susanne Thomas
- Education: Simpson College; Drake University

Elwood Lauren Thomas (July 24, 1930 – July 30, 1995) was a judge of the Supreme Court of Missouri, under an appointment by then-Governor John Ashcroft. He was retained at the November, 1992, election. He died while on the court from complications of Parkinson's Disease. He was remembered by his fellow judges as "one of the state's best legal minds." Before being appointed to the Supreme Court, Judge Thomas was a professor at the University of Missouri School of Law from 1965 to 1978, and then was a partner at Shook, Hardy & Bacon in Kansas City, Missouri.
