= Robert True Donnelly =

American judge

Chief Justice of the Supreme Court of Missouri
- In office July 1, 1973 – June 30, 1975
- Succeeded by: Robert E. Seiler
- In office July 1, 1981 – December 31, 1982
- Preceded by: John E. Bardgett
- Succeeded by: Albert L. Rendlen

Judge of the Supreme Court of Missouri
- In office September 7, 1965 – 1988
- Appointed by: Warren E. Hearnes
- Preceded by: Sidna Poage Dalton
- Succeeded by: Ann K. Covington

Personal details
- Born: August 31, 1924 Lebanon, Missouri
- Died: June 16, 1999 (aged 74) Jefferson City, Missouri
- Spouse: Wanda Sue Oates
- Education: University of Missouri School of Law; University of Missouri; University of Tulsa

Robert True Donnelly (August 31, 1924 – June 16, 1999) was a judge on the Missouri Supreme Court from 1965 until 1988, and the chief justice of that same court twice, from 1973 to 1975 and again from 1981 through 1982. He was educated at the public schools of Tulsa, Oklahoma and also did graduate work at the University of Tulsa. During his 23 years on the court, he authored 546 opinions. While Chief Justice, he drew headlines by criticizing the Supreme Court of the United States for interpreting the U.S. Constitution beyond what the Founding Fathers "had envisioned." He also claimed that modern education was failing because it didn't "teach religious and moral values." He once called the Miranda Rule, "an example of tipping the balance in favor of the accused."
