= George W. Draper III =

American judge

George Draper

Chief Justice of the Missouri Supreme Court
- In office July 1, 2019 – June 30, 2021
- Preceded by: Zel Fischer
- Succeeded by: Paul C. Wilson

Judge of the Missouri Supreme Court
- In office October 2011 – August 4, 2023
- Appointed by: Jay Nixon
- Preceded by: Michael A. Wolff
- Succeeded by: Kelly C. Broniec

Personal details
- Born: George William Draper III; August 5, 1953 (age 72) St. Louis, Missouri, U.S.
- Education: Morehouse College (BA); Howard University (JD)

George William Draper III (born August 5, 1953) is an American lawyer who served as a judge of the Supreme Court of Missouri from 2011 to 2023. He was appointed to the court by Governor Jay Nixon. Prior to his appointment to the Supreme Court, he served on the Missouri Court of Appeals, from 2000 to 2011. From 1998 to 2000, he served as a circuit judge in the St. Louis County Circuit Court; from 1994 to 1998 he was an associate circuit judge on the same court. He earned his Bachelor of Arts from Morehouse College, and his Juris Doctor from Howard University School of Law. His term as Chief Justice ended on June 30, 2021. He retired from the bench on August 4, 2023, one day shy of reaching the court's mandatory retirement age of 70.

Legal offices
Preceded by Michael A. Wolff	Judge of the Missouri Supreme Court; 2011–2023	Succeeded by Kelly C. Broniec
Preceded by Zel Fischer	Chief Justice of the Missouri Supreme Court; 2019–2021	Succeeded by Paul C. Wilson
