= Elihu H. Bay =

American judge

Elihu Ball Bay

Associate Justice of South Carolina

Personal details
- Born: c. 1754 Havre de Grace, Maryland
- Died: November 10, 1838

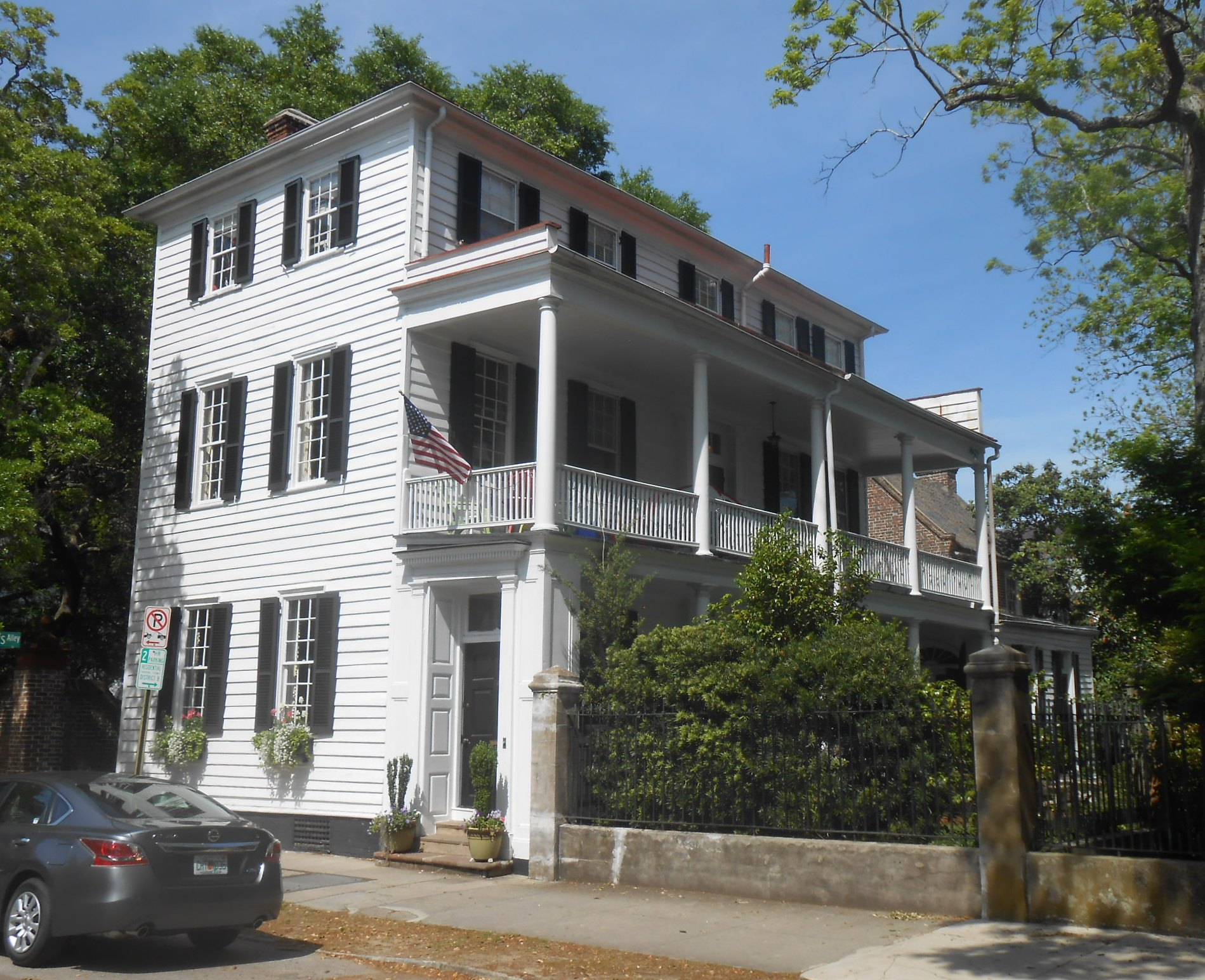
The Judge Elihu Bay House, at 76 Meeting Street, Charleston, South Carolina, is now the rectory for St. Michael's Episcopal Church.

Elihu Hall Bay (c. 1754—November 10, 1838) was an associate justice of the precursor to the South Carolina Supreme Court. He was elected as an associate justice of the Court of General Sessions and Common Pleas on February 17, 1791. Bay began the tradition of recording court decisions in South Carolina in 1809.

Bay died on November 10, 1838.
