= John Rice Jones =

American judge

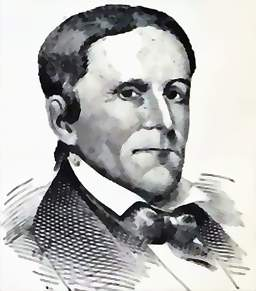

Missouri Supreme Court Justice
- In office 1821–1824
- Preceded by: none
- Succeeded by: George Tomkins

Personal details
- Born: February 11, 1759 Mallwyd, Wales, United Kingdom
- Died: February 1, 1824 (aged 64) St. Louis, Missouri, U.S.
- Spouse(s): Eliza (Powell) Jones (1781–1787); Mary (Barger) Jones (1791–1824)

John Rice Jones (February 11, 1759 – February 1, 1824) was a Welsh-born, American politician, jurist, and military officer. He helped establish the territorial governments in Indiana, Illinois, and Missouri. John Rice Jones was the father of U.S. Senator George Wallace Jones from Iowa.

== Early life ==
Jones was born in Mallwyd, Wales, the eldest of fourteen children to John Jones, an excise officer. He received his college education at Oxford University, studying both Medicine and Law. He chose Law as a career and established a practice in London, England In January, 1781 in Brecon, Wales Jones married Eliza Powell, daughter of Richard and Mary Powell. He remained in Brecon setting up as a solicitor, with chambers at Thanet Place in London.

== Life in America ==
=== Frontier military officer ===
In 1784 John Rice Jones sailed to the United States, settling in Philadelphia, Pennsylvania. He returned to Wales within the year to bring his wife and son, Rice Jones (1781–1808), back to America, though leaving behind his infant daughter, Maria. While in Philadelphia he became friends with prominent Americans Benjamin Franklin and Dr. Benjamin Rush while practicing law with noted early attorney Myers Fisher. After two years in Philadelphia hearing tales of the opportunities awaiting in the new American west, in 1786 he moved to Louisville, Kentucky. In September, of that year, he joined the frontier Virginia army, of General George Rogers Clark, in the campaign to quash, an uprising by, the Native Americans, of the Wabash Confederacy. As part of the ongoing conflict, a garrison was established at Fort Vincennes, with Jones appointed its Commissary General. Jones was joined by his family at Vincennes, but tragedy soon befell them as Eliza died in childbirth on March 11, 1787. The child, named Myers Fisher Jones for his Philadelphia friend, died soon afterward.

=== Lawyer and businessman ===
In the late 1780s John Rice Jones began to invest in land, both around Vincennes and Kaskaskia, in what would become the Illinois Territory. In his job as Commissary General Jones had made several trips to the Kaskaskia area. In March, 1791 his land holdings increased again as he was awarded a land tract near Vincennes by the U.S. Congress in appreciation for his military service. It was also in 1791—on his birthday February 11 in fact—that Jones married for a second time, to Mary Barger. While still maintaining his property and law practice at Vincennes, by the early 1790s Jones had moved his family to Kaskaskia. Fluent in French, Spanish, and English, Jones was able to draw on legal clients from all the white inhabitants of the area and would sometimes act as emissary or go-between for the various nationalities. Early settlers often being cash-poor, Jones would accept land parcels as payment for legal work and became one of the territories largest landowners. It was also in the late 1790s that Jones made his first forays into what would eventually become Missouri. In 1797 he accompanied Moses Austin in exploration of lead mining areas west and north of Ste. Genevieve. Shortly thereafter he would become business partners with Austin and two French territorial officials in a mining operation near Mine a' Breton.

=== Indiana Territorial official ===
In 1800 Indiana Territory was created from a portion of the old Northwest Territory. When territorial Governor (and later U.S. President) William Henry Harrison organized his administration in early 1801, he appointed Jones as the first Attorney General. The following year Jones, a pro-slavery advocate, participated in a conference that urged the U.S. Congress to repeal or suspend certain slavery portions of the 1787 Northwest Ordinance. With the reorganization of the territory came a new job for John Rice Jones in 1805 as Governor Harrison appointed him to the territory's Legislative Council, where he served until 1808. In 1808 Jones attempted to be named territorial delegate to the U.S. Congress, however a political and personal falling out with Harrison over slavery and the latter's dismissal of the Legislative Council scuttled Jones' bid to represent Indiana in Washington D.C. Perhaps John Rice Jones longest-lasting impact on Indiana came in 1807 when he helped in the founding of Vincennes University and served on its first board of trustees.

=== Illinois Territory advocate and murder of son ===
After his falling out with William Henry Harrison in 1808, John Rice Jones left Vincennes for good, choosing to relocate his law practice and family to Kaskaskia. There he and John Edgar championed the cause of splitting the Illinois counties out of Indiana Territory into their own governing entity. This goal was reached on March 1, 1809. However, Jones found nothing but considerable heartache in the new Illinois Territory. It began in December, 1808 when his son Rice Jones was murdered in Kaskaskia. The younger Jones had been involved in a heated political dispute with Shadrach Bond Jr. which led to a duel. Neither party was wounded in the affair of honor, but Bond's second, Dr. James Dunlap remained unsatisfied and allegedly arranged for the assassination of Rice Jones on a Kaskaskia street. The murderer was never apprehended. Soon after, Federal authorities ruled against many of John Rice Jones' land claims in Illinois, causing some financial loss.

=== Missouri Supreme Court justice, later life, and death ===
In 1810 Jones, already with considerable business holdings across the Mississippi River—namely his lead mining venture—left Illinois Territory for the Louisiana Territory (Missouri Territory after June 4, 1812) and settled around Mine a' Breton. For the next several years he largely concerned himself with lead mining and smelting. Once the Missouri Territory was organized, Jones served on the legislative council, as he had before in Indiana. In June, 1820 John Rice Jones was a delegate to the Missouri constitutional convention, his legal expertise often called upon in the drafting of the new states laws and regulations. With statehood came two United States Senators and ones very much desired to be one. David Barton was a first ballot selection to claim one of the seats, while Jones and four others vied for the remaining position. By a margin of one vote it went to Thomas Hart Benton.

As a consolation prize of sorts, but really a position much better suited to his temperament and training, John Rice Jones was named one of the three judges appointed to the Missouri Supreme Court in 1821. On the bench Judge Jones often cast dissenting votes and opinions on the various issues brought before the high court:

He participated in the decision of about one hundred and forty cases, and seems to have been the dissenting judge of his day. Fifteen dissenting, or non-concurring, opinions by him are reported. In twenty-eight of the one hundred and forty cases mentioned, he delivered the opinion of the court. In one of his dissenting opinions he remarked that he had not " been in the practice of the law for some time." (Holmes v. Elliott, 1 Mo. 41, 45.) Whether it is that circumstance which induced the large proportion of dissents and the comparatively small number of majority opinions, or whether the wholesome lesson is to be drawn that a judge prone to elaborate dissenting opinions is thereby clogged in writing opinions that are to stand for the law, is a question beyond the scope of this sketch. In Brown v. Ward, 1 Mo. 209, Judge Jones apologized for the brevity of his opinion because of "the very weak state of health which I have been in for these weeks past." This illness seems to have terminated fatally, for he was not on the bench after November, 1823.

Jones died without completing his first term on the court, on February 1, 1824.
