= Andrew Jackson Higgins (judge) =

American judge

Andrew J. Higgins

Chief Justice of the Supreme Court of Missouri
- In office July 1, 1985 – June 30, 1987
- Succeeded by: William Howard Billings

Judge of the Supreme Court of Missouri
- In office July 3, 1979 – June 21, 1991
- Appointed by: Joseph P. Teasdale
- Succeeded by: Elwood L. Thomas

Personal details
- Born: June 21, 1921 Platte City, Missouri
- Died: September 14, 2011 (aged 90) Jefferson City, Missouri
- Spouse: Laura Jo-Ann Higgins
- Education: Central Methodist College; Washington University School of Law; Central College

Andrew Jackson Higgins (June 21, 1921 – September 14, 2011) was a judge on the Supreme Court of Missouri between 1979 and 1991, and its Chief Justice from 1985 to 1987. Previously, he had served as a commissioner for the Supreme Court between 1964 and 1979, and as Circuit Court Judge for Platte County from 1960 to 1964.

Zel Fischer, a current Judge of the Supreme Court of Missouri, clerked for Judge Higgins from 1988 to 1989; Judge Higgins administered Judge Fischer's oath.

After retiring from the bench, Judge Higgins joined the law firm Inglish & Monaco, P.C., in Jefferson City, Missouri. He practiced and was then Of Counsel until his death.

Higgins also became an advocate against plans to change the way Missouri selects its judges.

== Sources ==
https://www.courts.mo.gov/page.jsp?id=120176
