= William Scott (Missouri judge) =

American judge

William Scott (June 7, 1804 – 1862) was an American lawyer and judge who served on the Supreme Court of Missouri from 1841 to 1849 and from 1851 to 1862. He also served on the Jefferson City Circuit Court. Justice Scott was the author of the majority opinion in Scott v. Emerson, 15 Missouri 572 (1852), which was part of the Dred Scott v. Sandford case. Scott's opinion, which overturned well-established precedent in Missouri, set the stage for Dred Scott's case in the Supreme Court. He wrote:

Times are not now as they were when the former decisions on this subject were made. Since then not only individuals but States have been possessed with a dark and fell spirit in relation to slavery, whose gratification is sought in the pursuit of measures, whose inevitable consequences must be the overthrow and destruction of our government. Under such circumstances it does not behoove the State of Missouri to show the least countenance to any measure which might gratify this spirit. She is willing to assume her full responsibility for the existence of slavery within her limits, nor does she seek to share or divide it with others.

Born in Fauquier County, Virginia, Scott moved to Missouri in 1827 and became a Circuit Attorney, living in Union. He took Mathias McGirk's spot on the state supreme court in 1841 when McGirk resigned. He was confirmed to the position in 1843. In 1849 all positions on the court were vacated by a constitutional amendment. In 1851 Scott was returned to the court after another constitutional amendment made the justices' positions elective, succeeding James Harvey Birch, who declined to run; he was re-elected in 1857. In late 1861 he was one of the justices who refused to take an oath of loyalty to the national government, and lost his position. After his death in 1862 he was buried on his farm near Jefferson City.
