= John D. S. Dryden =

American judge (1814–1886)

John Debos Sharp Dryden (March 27, 1814 – December 10, 1886) was an American lawyer and judge from Missouri.

== Biography ==
Born in Washington County, Virginia, Dryden moved to Warren County, Missouri with his family and received a basic education while working on their farm. He studied law under Judge Mathias McGirk.

In 1838, Dryden was admitted to the bar and established his practice in Palmyra, Marion County, Missouri. He formed a partnership with Thomas L. Anderson from 1845 to 1848.

In 1862, W. P. Hall appointed Dryden to the Supreme Court of Missouri. He was elected to the bench in November 1863. However, in 1865, Dryden refused to vacate his office under the "Ousting Ordinance" passed during the constitutional convention that year. Governor Thomas C. Fletcher demanded his resignation, and when Dryden refused, he was forcibly removed and charged with "disturbing the peace by interference with the Supreme Court." After his term ended, he continued his practice in St. Louis until health issues led to his retirement.

Dryden died on December 10, 1886.
