= William Barclay Napton =

American judge

William B. Napton

Judge of the Supreme Court of Missouri
- In office 1839–1851
- Appointed by: Lilburn Boggs
- Preceded by: John Cummins Edwards
- In office 1857–1861
- In office 1873–1881

4th Attorney General of Missouri
- In office 1836–1839
- Governor: Daniel Dunklin; Lilburn Boggs
- Preceded by: Robert William Wells
- Succeeded by: Samuel Mansfield Bay

Personal details
- Born: March 23, 1808 Princeton, New Jersey, US
- Died: January 8, 1883 (aged 74) Rural Saline County, Missouri, US
- Spouse: Melinda (Williams) Napton
- Education: Princeton University; University of Virginia

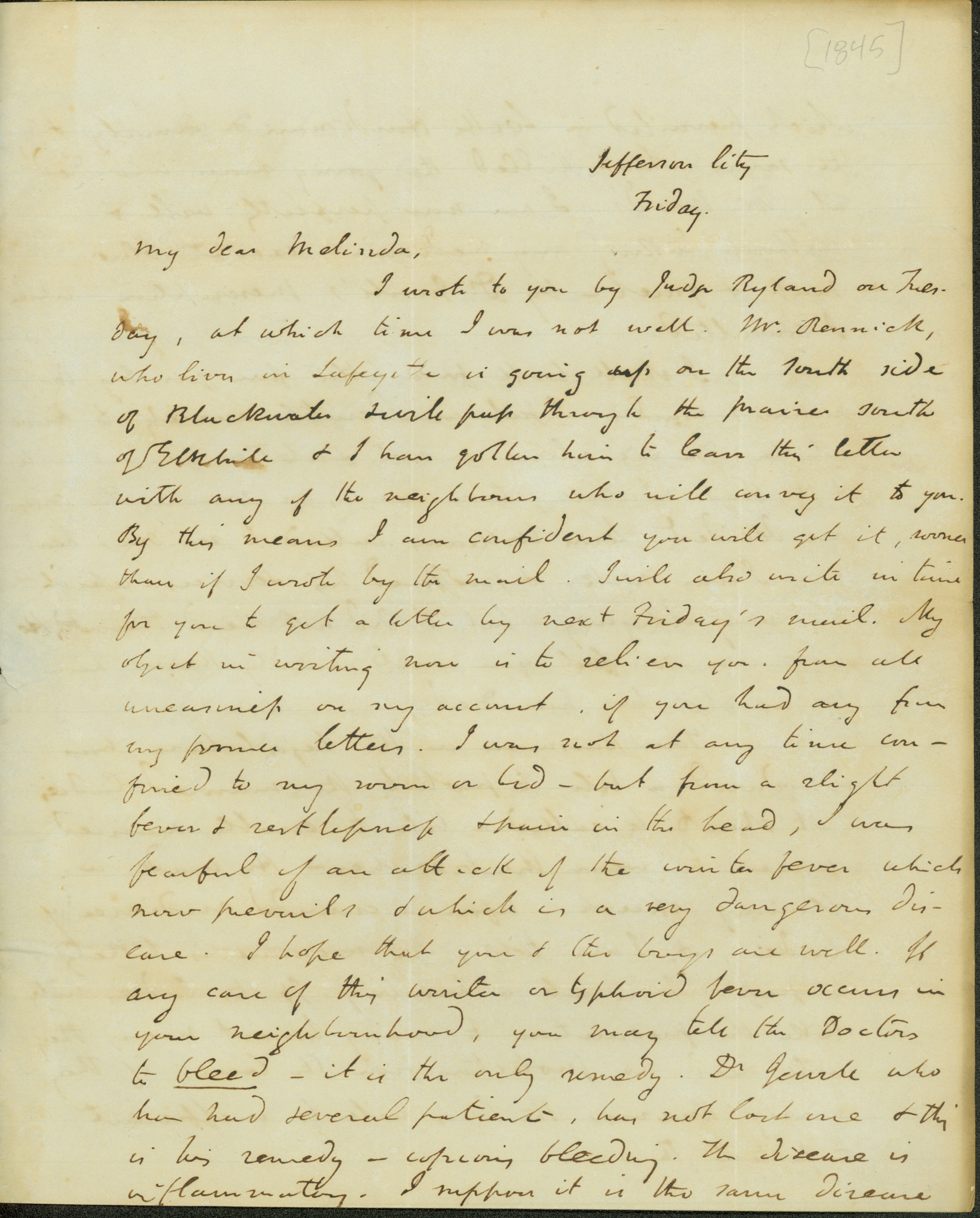
Letter from William B. Napton, Jefferson City, Missouri, to his wife Melinda, Saline County, Missouri, 1845

William Barclay Napton (1808–1883) was an American politician and jurist from the state of Missouri. A Democrat, Napton served as the state's 4th Attorney General, and multiple terms on the Missouri Supreme Court.

== Early life ==
William Barclay Napton was born March 23, 1808, in Princeton, New Jersey, to John and Susan Barclay (Hight) Napton. Napton's father was a moderately successful tailor, enough so that as the oldest son William received private tutoring before enrollment in Princeton and Lawrenceville (New Jersey) preparatory academies. Napton then entered Princeton College in 1824 at the age of sixteen as a Junior, his previous studies and knack for Latin and Greek languages allowing him to bypass his freshman and sophomore years. Following his graduation in 1826 Napton moved to Albemarle County, Virginia, where he was employed as a tutor for the children of General William F. Gordon for a period of two years. He then studied law at the University of Virginia, earning his degree in 1830. After graduation Napton found the abundance of lawyers in Charlottesville, Virginia, made finding work as an attorney difficult, so for two years he and a University of Virginia classmate operated Mudwell Academy, a college preparatory school. Napton entered the Virginia Bar in 1831, but the next year moved to Missouri.

Settling briefly in Columbia, William Napton soon moved to the Howard County town of Fayette, then a hotbed of Missouri politics. As in Charlottesville, Napton found establishing a law practice, especially as a newcomer, difficult. However he had quickly made powerful friends in Democratic politics, including former Missouri Governor John Miller, Meredith Miles Marmaduke and Dr. John Sappington. This group, collectively known as the "Central Clique—Jacksonian Democrats and acolytes of Missouri Senator Thomas Hart Benton—dominated the state's politics in pre-Civil War times. At their urging Napton started a newspaper, the Boon's Lick Democrat, serving as editor. On March 27, 1838, Napton married Melinda Williams. Napton and his wife would eventually become parents of ten living children, nine boys and one girl.

== Politics ==
With the assistance of his politically powerful friends in the Central Clique, William Napton was elected secretary of the Missouri State Senate in September, 1834, a position he held concurrently with his duties at the newspaper. His backers also saw to it that the Boon's Lick Democrat was awarded lucrative contracts to print many state manuals and documents. In December 1836 Missouri Governor Lilburn Boggs, another Clique member, appointed Napton the state's fourth Attorney General, replacing Robert W. Wells, who had resigned to take a Federal judgeship. It was a history-making time to be in Missouri government, with major issues like the Honey War—a border dispute with Iowa, the 1838 Mormon War and Governor Boggs' Executive Order 44 in the forefront. Other than to offer the Governor requested opinions on the constitutionality of certain measures however, Napton's time as Attorney General was relatively unremarkable.

In January, 1839 William Napton was appointed to the Missouri Supreme Court by Governor Boggs. Napton served nearly 25 years on the court, albeit not consecutively, and his total tenure ranks fifth on the list of time served. During his first period on the court, from 1839 to 1851, Judge Napton and the other justices were presented with multiple cases pertaining to the freedom of slaves. A slave holder himself, Napton held strong pro-slavery opinions and favored overturning earlier and lesser courts rulings that might free the slaves in the state. He and Justice James Harvey Birch, held the view that the Missouri Compromise was unconstitutional and that the U.S. Congress lacked the legal power to legislate slavery in territorial areas. Due to a change in Missouri law in 1851, Supreme Court justices were elected instead of appointed, and Napton was defeated in his first election. This was due in large part to a split among the Missouri Democratic party over the expansion of slavery. Senator Thomas Hart Benton and a faction of "free soil" followers felt slavery should be curtailed in new territories while Napton's pro-slavery faction were against anything of the sort. In 1849 pro-slavery Democrats had Napton author a series of instructions for the state's representatives in Washington D.C. These instructions came to be known as the "Jackson Resolutions", for Claiborne Fox Jackson an ardent pro-slavery Democrat who sponsored them in the Missouri Senate. Fallout from this party split cost both Napton and Benton their positions.

Following his 1851 election defeat, and with a large family to support, William Napton became a circuit lawyer, traveling throughout the state but mainly the counties along the Missouri River. Still though Napton remained a leader in the pro-slaver faction of Missouri Democrats. In 1855 he was one of the principal organizers of the Proslavery Convention held in Lexington. Over 200 delegates, mostly from the western part of the state, gathered there to create a series of resolutions that advocated the position of states rights held by many slave holding southern states. This conference would set the stage for Napton's return to the Missouri Supreme Court, being elected handily in August, 1857.

William Napton's second term on the high court lasted until December, 1861. At that time he was removed from the bench for refusing to swear an allegiance oath to the Union. Two months earlier a strongly pro-Union provisional government seized control of the state after Federal forces occupied Jefferson City, exiling Claiborne Jackson and pro-Confederate members of the state legislature. The provisional government then set about securing the loyalty oaths of those remaining. In addition to Napton, Justices Ephraim B. Ewing and William Scott, among others, refused the oath. The ensuing war years were hard on Napton and his family, with harassment both verbal and physical by Federal militia and pro-Union officials. One apocryphal story involved Napton being dragged from Elkhill, his Saline County farm, by a noose around his neck. Only intervention by a pro-Union official who had remained a Napton friend prevented his hanging. Another apocryphal story connected with the tragic death of Napton's wife Melinda. Federal troops searching for hidden weapons on the Napton property caused the pregnant Mrs. Napton to faint and fall. In fact, a few weeks later, on December 31, 1862, she died during childbirth along with the infant, the couple's tenth son.

Following his wife's death William Napton moved to St. Louis, Missouri and once again took up his law practice. Most of his journals and personal papers from the era were destroyed later, so little is known of Napton's activities during the Civil War period. Two of his sons did however serve with Confederate forces. Arrested by Federal troops in St. Louis, he was not allowed to begin his law practice until he swore the loyalty oath that had cost Napton his Supreme Court position. This time, with his wife dead, Saline County farm in ruins, and nearly bankrupt Napton reluctantly agreed. His law practice in St. Louis proved lucrative by the late 1860s, and he again found himself involved in state politics. This led, in June 1873 to Napton's third and final appointment to the Missouri Supreme Court. Initially appointed to fill the term of Justice Ephraim B. Ewing, who died suddenly, Napton was elected to the court in his own right the following year by over fifty thousand votes. His health increasingly poor, Napton retired from the court rather than run for another six-year term in 1880.

Napton lived out the remaining years of his life at Elkhill, his home in Saline County, which had been rebuilt with the help of one of his sons. William Barclay Napton died January 8, 1883. He was buried next to his wife on the family farm.

Napton is the namesake of the community of Napton, Missouri.

Legal offices
Preceded by Robert William Wells	Missouri State Attorney General; 1836–1839	Succeeded by Samuel Mansfield Bay
