= Supreme Court of Missouri =

Highest court in the U.S. state of Missouri

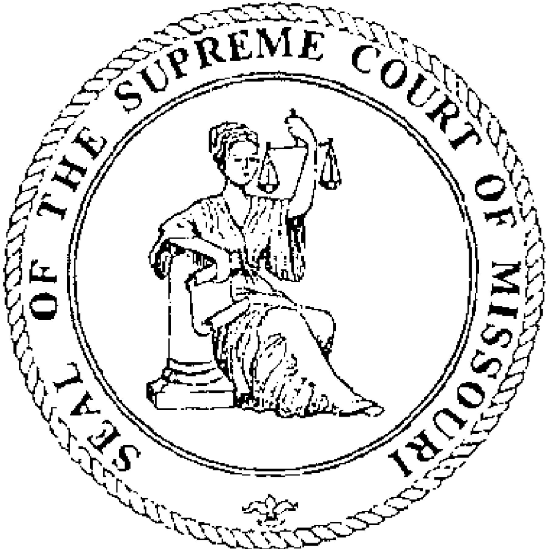
- Seal of the Supreme Court of Missouri
- Interactive map of Supreme Court of Missouri
- 38°34′40.685″N 92°10′26.281″W
- Established: 1820
- Jurisdiction: Missouri
- Location: Jefferson City, Missouri
- Coordinates: 38°34′40.685″N 92°10′26.281″W
- Composition method: Gubernatorial appointment with retention election
- Authorised by: Missouri Constitution
- Appeals to: Supreme Court of the United States (for matters of federal law or the U.S. Constitution)
- Judge term length: 12 years
- Number of positions: 7
- Website: Official website

Chief Justice
- Currently: W. Brent Powell
- Since: July 1, 2025
- Lead position ends: June 30, 2027

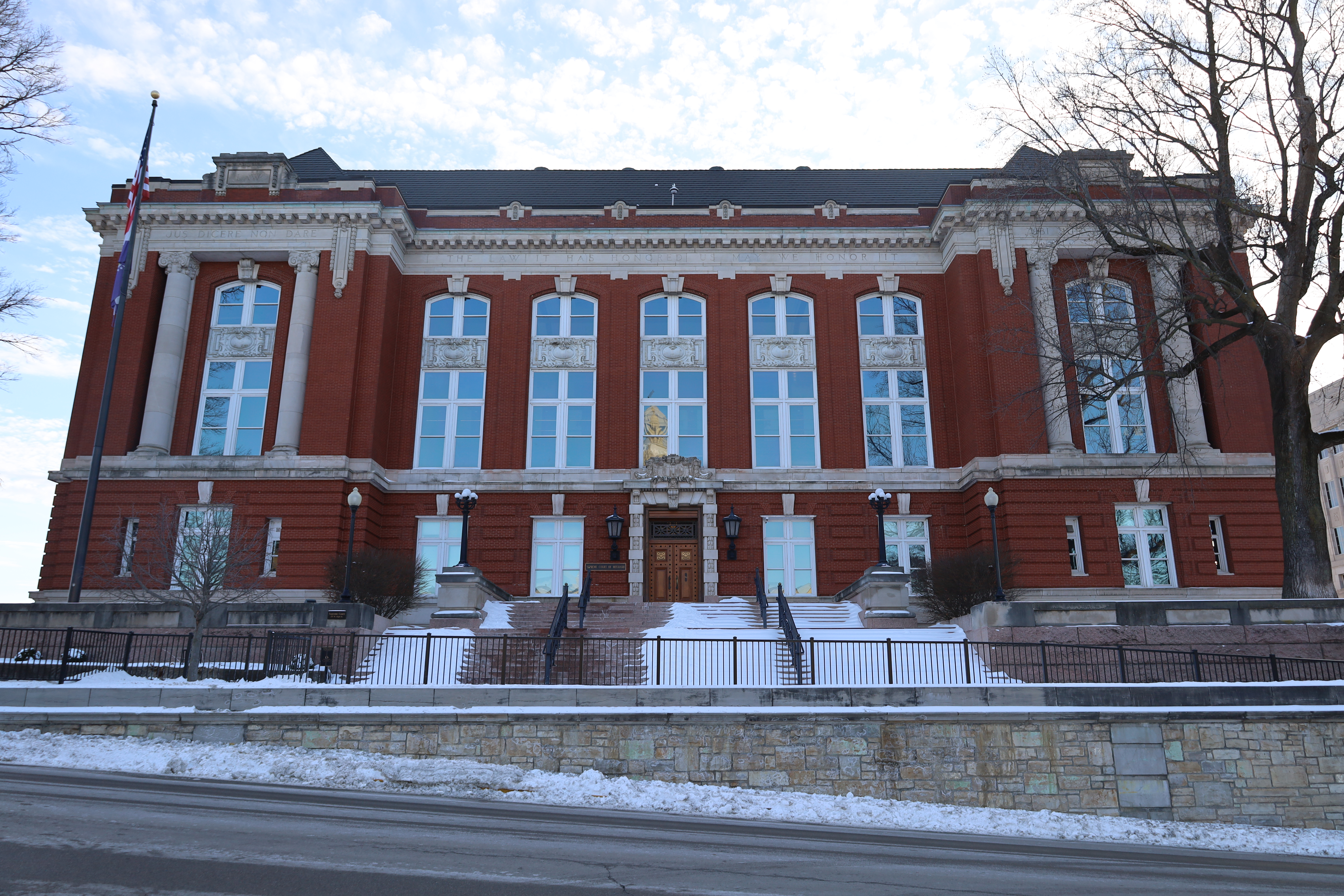
Missouri Supreme Court Building in Jefferson City, Missouri, in 2025

The Supreme Court of Missouri (SCOMO) is the highest court in the state of Missouri. It was established in 1820 and is located at 207 West High Street in Jefferson City, Missouri. Missouri voters have approved changes in the state's constitution to give the Supreme Court exclusive jurisdiction – the sole legal power to hear – over five types of cases on appeal. Pursuant to Article V, Section 3 of the Missouri Constitution, these cases involve:

- The validity of a United States statute or treaty.
- The validity of a Missouri statute or constitutional provision.
- The state's revenue laws.
- Challenges to a statewide elected official's right to hold office.
- Imposition of the death penalty.

Unless their case involves one of those five issues, people who want a trial court's decision reviewed must appeal to the Missouri Court of Appeals. Most of these cases involve routine legal questions and end there. The Court of Appeals is divided geographically into the Eastern District, Western District and Southern District.

Certain cases, however, can be transferred to the Supreme Court – at the court's discretion – if it determines that a question of general interest or importance is involved, that the laws should be re-examined, or that the lower court's decision conflicts with an earlier appellate decision. This is similar to the process the United States Supreme Court uses in accepting cases. In addition, the Court of Appeals may transfer a case to the Supreme Court after an opinion is issued, either upon application of one of the parties or at the request of one of the judges on the appellate panel.

The Supreme Court of Missouri also presides over impeachment trials unless the accused party is the governor or a judge of the Supreme Court. In those instances, a special commission is selected by the legislature.

In addition to issuing legal decisions, the Supreme Court supervises the lower state courts with the assistance of the Office of State Courts Administrator (OSCA). OSCA oversees court programs, provides technical assistance, manages the budget of the state's judicial branch, and conducts educational programs. The Supreme Court also issues practice and procedure rules for Missouri court cases, including procedure and evidence rules. The Supreme Court licenses attorneys practicing in Missouri, and disciplines lawyers and judges for violating ethical rules.

== History ==
=== Founding ===
Upon the organization of Missouri as a territory in 1812, settlers established a court system. The "superior court" was the highest court of the territorial legal system. The superior court had three judges, and it had original and appellate jurisdiction in both civil and criminal cases. The territorial legal system was initially modeled after French and Spanish civil law, but by 1816 the legislature adopted English common law as the law of Missouri.

Article V of the 1820 Constitution of Missouri established the Supreme Court of Missouri more than a year before Missouri was admitted as a state of the United States.

The judicial power as to matters of law and equity, shall be vested in a "Supreme Court" in a "Chancellor" in "Circuit Courts", and in such inferior tribunals as the general assembly may, from time to time, ordain and establish.

The 1820 Constitution granted the Supreme Court appellate jurisdiction while also giving it "superintending control over all inferior courts". The drafters of the Constitution modeled the state judiciary after the federal system, with elements from the constitutions of Kentucky and New York also evident.

The Supreme Court was to consist of three judges and required that the state be divided into "convenient districts, not to exceed four" over which the Court would preside. The Constitution further required the Court to hold at least two sessions in every district each year and limited its jurisdiction to the district it sat in at the time, though it authorized the General Assembly to waive that requirement.

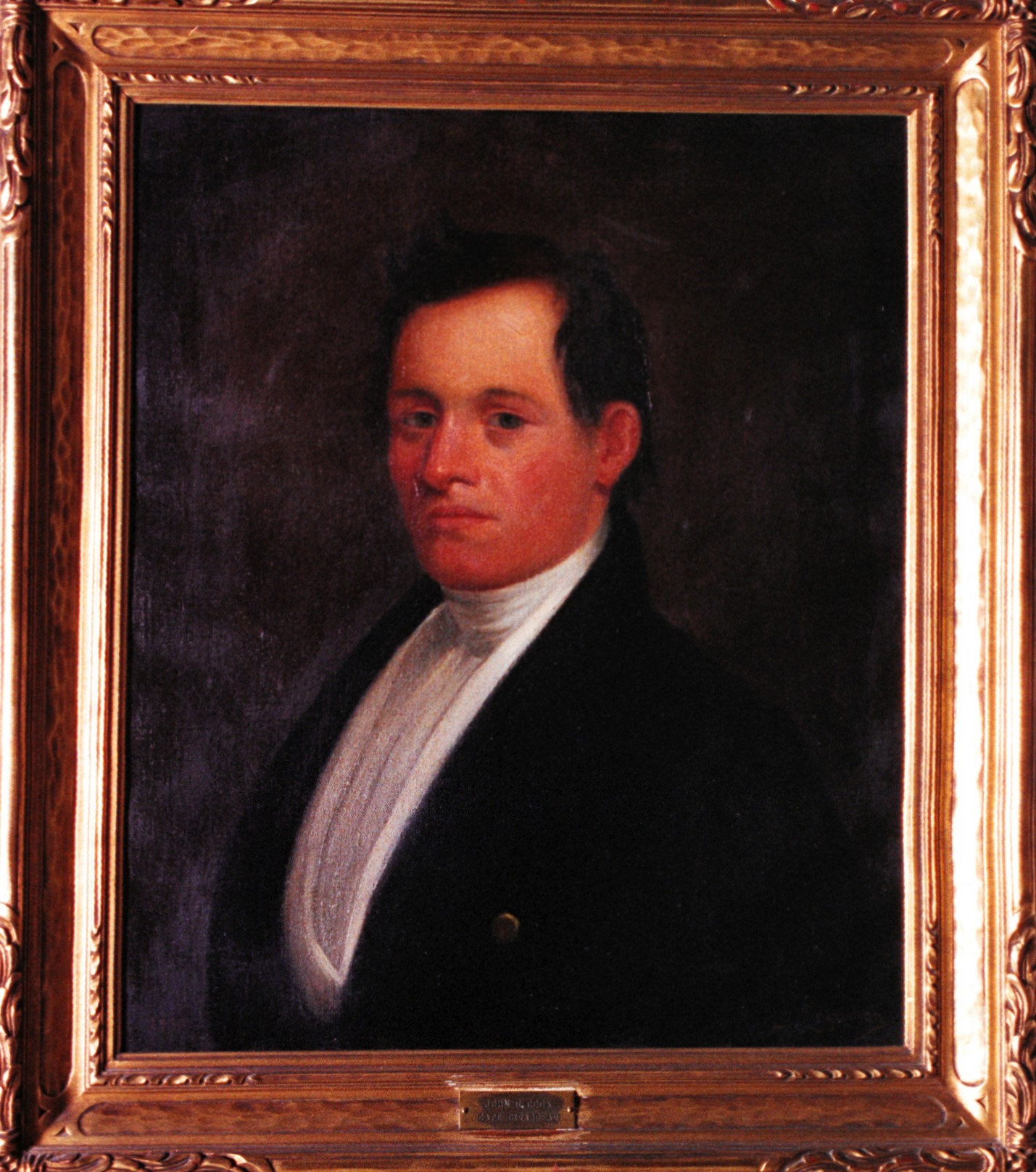
A portrait of John Dillard Cook, who served on the Supreme Court of Missouri from 1820 to 1823

Judges were to be nominated by the governor and they were to be appointed with the advice and consent of the senate. They held office during good behavior, provided they were between the ages of thirty and sixty-five, and were entitled to an annual salary that could not be diminished during their tenure. The Court was to appoint its own clerk. A judge could be removed upon a two-thirds address from each chamber of the General Assembly to the governor, though the chambers were required to state the grounds for removal and the judge was entitled to present a defense before the General Assembly.

Alexander McNair, the first governor of Missouri, nominated Mathias McGirk, John Dillard Cook, and John Rice Jones to serve as the first judges on the Court. McGirk was appointed on November 13, 1820 and served as the chief justice until 1841. Cook was appointed on November 16, 1820 and served until 1823. Jones was appointed November 27, 1820 and served until his death in 1824. The Court considered its first case on March 6, 1821, when it heard oral arguments for Hickman v. Barnes.

=== Civil War ===
In July 1861, amidst the American Civil War, the Union-backed provisional government which had taken control of Missouri appointed Hamilton Gamble, a former Missouri Supreme Court judge, as governor. During a convention held in October 1861, delegates of the provisional Union government passed an ordinance requiring civil officers of Missouri to pledge a loyalty oath to the Union. The Court's three judges—Ephraim Brevard Ewing, William Barclay Napton, and William Scott—refused to take the oath, resulting in their positions being vacated. In January 1862, Gamble replaced the judges with Barton Bates, William Van Ness Bay, and John D.S. Dryden. In 1865, delegates to a constitutional convention drafted a new Missouri state constitution, with a new "ironclad" loyalty oath requirement. As part of its effort to enforce the new loyalty oath, the convention passed an ordinance vacating all judicial offices on May 1, 1865. Bates resigned in February 1865, but Bay and Dryden refused to leave their positions on the Court until the governor ordered them to be forcibly removed.

=== 19th Century ===
In 1850, as part of the Jacksonian democracy movement, the Missouri Constitution was amended to adopt popular election of judges, including Supreme Court judges. The judges' terms were also reduced from twelve years to six.

The 1865 Missouri Constitution created district courts with appellate jurisdiction over the decisions of circuit courts, with further appeal to the Supreme Court of Missouri. The district courts, however, did not have appellate jurisdiction over county or probate courts, meaning the Supreme Court still received many appeals. By the 1870s, the Court had a two-year backlog of cases.

In November 1872, voters approved an amendment to the Missouri Constitution which expanded the Court from three to five judges and also increased the judges' terms in office to ten years.

The 1875 Missouri Constitution included a provision creating the St. Louis Court of Appeals, which had jurisdiction over courts in Lincoln, St. Charles, St. Louis and Warren counties and the city of St. Louis. Because many of the appeals on the Supreme Court's backlog were from St. Louis, the state's most populous city at the time, the St. Louis Bar Association petitioned delegates to the 1875 constitutional convention to create an intermediate appellate court serving the area.

The Supreme Court still struggled with its caseload, however, and so in 1883, the Missouri General Assembly proposed a constitutional amendment expanding the jurisdiction of the St. Louis Court of Appeals to fifty-one additional counties as well as creating the Kansas City Court of Appeals with jurisdiction over fifty counties in western Missouri. Voters ratified the amendment in 1884. The General Assembly also passed an act in 1883 which authorized the Court to appoint three commissioners authorized to issue preliminary decisions on cases which the Court could then accept, modify, or reject. The commissioners issued preliminary decisions on four hundred sixty-eight cases in their first two years in office.

Rear of the 1878 Missouri Supreme Court building in Jefferson City

In 1890, voters amended the constitution to expand the Court from five judges to seven. The judges sat in two divisions, with four judges in the first division and three in the second division.

Under the 1820 Constitution, the Court traveled to hear cases, but the 1875 Constitution required the Court to preside only in Jefferson City, the state's capital. As such, the General Assembly appropriated $17,000 for a Supreme Court building in Jefferson City. Construction of the courthouse, which relied on prison labor, began in 1877 and was completed in 1878.

=== 20th Century ===
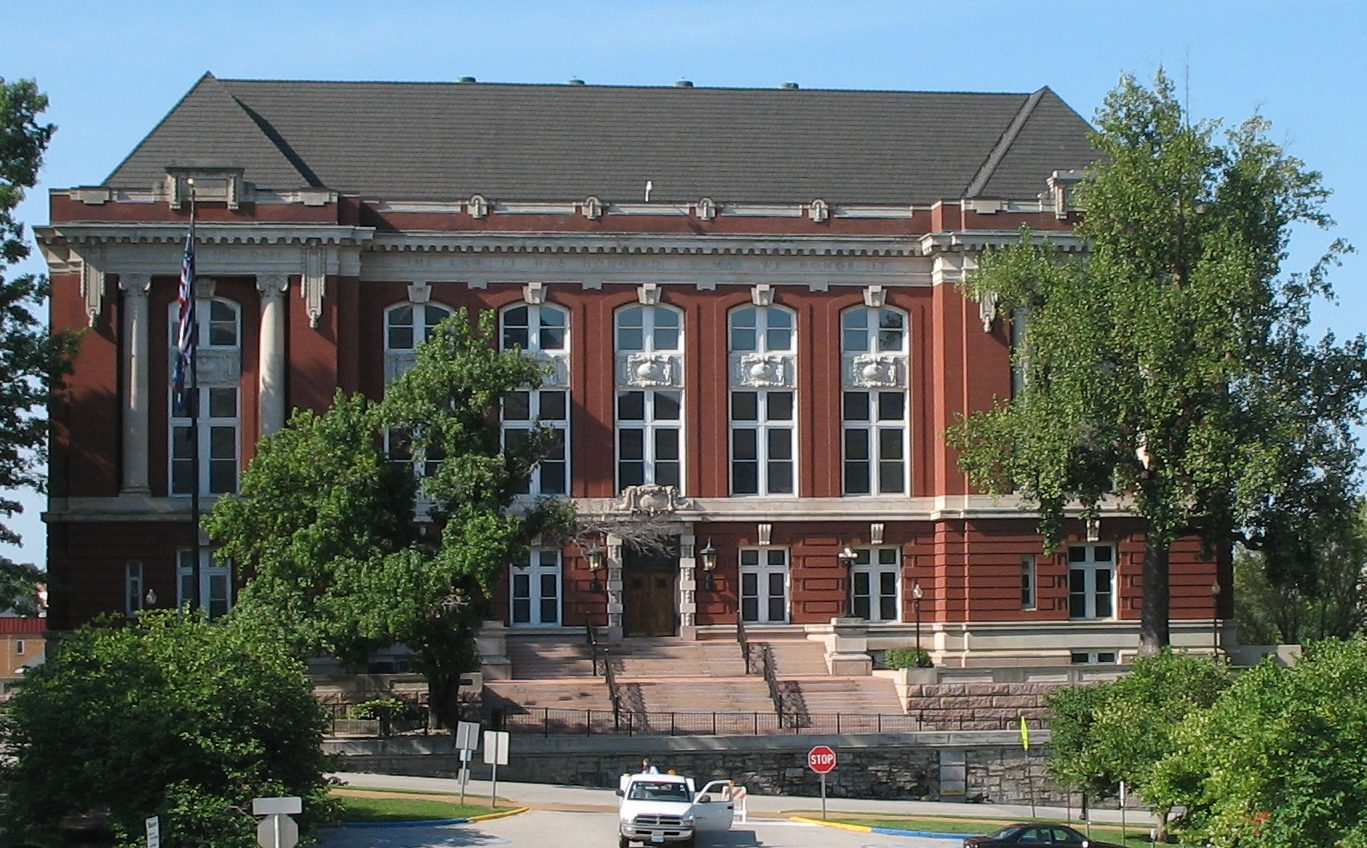
2007 photograph of the Missouri Supreme Court building, built in 1907, in Jefferson City

Though the Court received a dedicated building in 1878, the Court used it for only twenty-nine years. Alexander Dockery, governor from 1901 to 1905, called the courthouse "an architectural freak". In March 1905, the General Assembly appropriated $400,000 for a new courthouse to be built and construction to the south of the Missouri capitol building began in October 1905. The courthouse opened for arguments on October 8, 1907.

In 1909, the General Assembly created a third intermediate appellate court, the Springfield Court of Appeals with jurisdiction over more than thirty counties.

Since 1850, Supreme Court judges, like all judges in Missouri, had been selected by popular election. In the early twentieth century, with the domination of state politics by the Democratic Party and the empowerment of political party bosses like Tom Pendergast of Kansas City, concerns grew about the independence and integrity of the judiciary. A statewide committee recommended Missouri adopt a nonpartisan plan for selecting judges, but the General Assembly failed to put such an amendment on the ballot, prompting the committee to put its recommendation on the November 1940 ballot by initiative petition instead. Voters approved the Missouri Nonpartisan Court Plan amendment in 1940, but the General Assembly responded by passing a resolution subjecting the amendment to another vote in November 1942, though voters again voted in favor of the Plan. The nonpartisan Missouri Plan was carried into the 1945 Constitution, along with an additional provision expanding Supreme Court judges' terms to twelve years.

The nonpartisan Missouri Plan applies to the Supreme Court, among other Missouri courts, and determines how its judges are selected. The Plan requires a nonpartisan commission—in the case of the Supreme Court, the Appellate Judicial Commission—to nominate three candidates, one of which the governor then selects to become a judge. To receive a full term in office, the judge is subject to a retention vote after the first year in office and before the start of each subsequent term. The Appellate Judicial Commission is composed of the chief justice of the Court, three lawyers elected by the lawyers of the Missouri Bar, and three citizens selected by the governor. As of 2022, thirty-eight states used judicial selection procedures based on the Missouri Plan.

On August 3, 1976, Missouri voters passed an amendment to the constitution which restructured the state courts. The amendment consolidated the three intermediate appellate courts (St. Louis, Kansas City, and Springfield Courts of Appeal) into one Missouri Court of Appeals with three geographic regions, moved the automatic right to appeal for certain cases from the Supreme Court to the new Court of Appeals, eliminated the position of Supreme Court commissioners, combined the two Supreme Court "divisions", and required judges to retire at age seventy, among other changes. The amendment went into effect in January 1979.

In 1994, the Court presided over the only impeachment trial in Missouri's history after the House of Representatives passed articles of impeachment against Secretary of State Judith Moriarty. The Court convicted Moriarty of misconduct and removed her from office. This is the only time the Court has presided over a trial.

== Judicial selection ==
Judges of the court are selected through the Missouri Nonpartisan Court Plan, nationally known as the Missouri Plan.

Under the plan, the Appellate Judicial Commission submits the names of three nominees to the governor. If the governor fails to make an appointment with 60 days of the nominees being named, the Commission shall make the appointment. Judges serving for at least a year are placed on the general election ballot for a retention vote of the people. If retained, judges serve a term of 12 years.

At the time of its establishment, the court had three judges, which was expanded to five in 1872, and seven in 1890.

== Landmark decisions ==
Some decisions by the Supreme Court of Missouri later come to be considered landmark decisions, often because of their impact on law throughout the United States. Many of these decisions, especially those with nationwide significance, involve cases which were appealed from the Supreme Court of Missouri to the Supreme Court of the United States. A case may constitute a landmark decision if it established a significant new legal principle or concept, overturned prior precedent, departed from prior judicial practice, or created a new test or standard to be applied by courts in the future.

- Winny v. Whitesides, 1 Mo. 472 (1824)
  - Slavery; holding that an enslaved woman who had for a period lived with her enslavers in free territory thereby became free and remained free even after being brought to Missouri, establishing the "once free, always free" precedent in the state.
- Scott v. Emerson, 15 Mo. 576 (1852)
  - Slavery; holding that Dred and Harriet Scott were not emancipated from slavery upon entering free territory, overruling the "once free, always free" precedent of prior decisions. The Supreme Court of the United States affirmed the denial of Scott's freedom in Dred Scott v. Sandford, 60 U.S. 393 (1857), ruling that Black people could not be American citizens and that Congress lacked authority to prohibit slavery in federal territories.
- Minor v. Happersett, 53 Mo. 58 (1873); 88 U.S. 162 (1875)
  - Women's suffrage; holding that the Equal Protection Clause of the Fourteenth Amendment does not guarantee a woman the right to vote, affirmed by the Supreme Court of the United States.
- Missouri ex rel. Gaines v. Canada, 113 S.W.2d 783 (Mo. 1937); 305 U.S. 337 (1938)
  - Racial segregation; upholding the denial of a Black resident's application to the University of Missouri School of Law on the grounds that Missouri could satisfy the "separate but equal" doctrine of Plessy v. Ferguson by paying for his tuition to an out-of-state school, reversed by the Supreme Court of the United States as a violation of the Equal Protection Clause of the Fourteenth Amendment.
- Lavender v. Kurn, 189 S.W.2d 253 (Mo. 1945); 327 U.S. 645 (1946)
  - Legal procedure; holding that a jury's verdict was unwarranted where the Supreme Court of Missouri found that a contrary factual conclusion was more reasonable, reversed by the Supreme Court of the United States on the grounds that appellate courts must not disturb jury verdicts solely because they feel a different inference is more reasonable.
- Shelley v. Kraemer, 198 S.W.2d 679 (Mo. 1946); 334 U.S. 1 (1948)
  - Racial segregation; upholding the enforcement of a racially restrictive covenant prohibiting Black people from owning property in a St. Louis neighborhood, reversed by the Supreme Court of the United States as discriminatory state action in violation of the Equal Protection Clause of the Fourteenth Amendment.
- Cruzan v. Director, Missouri Department of Health, 760 S.W.2d 408 (Mo. 1988); 497 U.S. 261 (1990)
  - Right to die; holding that life support may be removed only if an incapacitated patient's wishes are established by clear and convincing evidence, affirmed by the Supreme Court of the United States.
- Missouri v. Seibert, 93 S.W.3d 700 (Mo. 2002); 542 U.S. 600 (2004)
  - Miranda rights; holding that police cannot withhold Miranda warnings while questioning a suspect but then give the required warnings after a confession and ask the suspect to repeat the confession, affirmed by the Supreme Court of the United States.
- Roper v. Simmons, 112 S.W.3d 397 (Mo. 2003); 543 U.S. 551 (2005)
  - Death penalty; overturned Christopher Simmon's death sentence, holding that executing individuals for crimes committed as minors constituted cruel and unusual punishment under the Eighth Amendment, affirmed by the Supreme Court of the United States.

== Current judges ==
Ginger Gooch is the latest appointee to the court, having been appointed by Missouri Governor Mike Parson in October 2023. The judges rotate the two-year term of chief justice among themselves. The chief justice is constitutionally empowered to preside over the court and to be the "chief administrative officer" of the state judicial system. The current chief justice is W. Brent Powell, whose term began July 1, 2025 and will serve until June 30, 2027.

As of September 1, 2025, the makeup of the court is:

Name	Born	Start	Chief term	Term ends (Note: Term ends Dec. 31 of the year listed.)	Mandatory retirement (Note: Justices must retire by their 70th birthday.)	Appointer	Law school
W. Brent Powell, Chief Justice	July 21, 1970 (age 56)	April 25, 2017	2025–present	2030	2040	Eric Greitens (R)	Missouri
Mary Rhodes Russell	July 28, 1958 (age 68)	September 20, 2004	2013–2015; 2023–2025	2030	2028	Bob Holden (D)	Missouri
Zel Fischer	April 28, 1963 (age 63)	October 15, 2008	2017–2019	2034	2033	Matt Blunt (R)	UMKC
Paul C. Wilson	May 23, 1961 (age 65)	December 3, 2012	2021–2023	2038	2031	Jay Nixon (D)	Missouri
Robin Ransom	July 21, 1967 (age 59)	May 24, 2021	–	2034	2037	Mike Parson (R)	Missouri
Kelly C. Broniec	1971 (age 54–55)	September 25, 2023	–	2036	2041	Mike Parson (R)	Missouri
Ginger Gooch	1975 (age 50–51)	November 1, 2023	–	2036	2045	Mike Parson (R)	Missouri

== Clerk of the Supreme Court of Missouri ==
The Clerk of the Supreme Court of Missouri is responsible for a wide range of duties, including the supervision of the internal administrative function of the court itself as well as the planning and administrative direction of the Missouri Judicial Conference, the organization of all the state's judges. As of January 1, 2017, the clerk is Betsy AuBuchon, the first woman to serve in that position.
