= 1896 Missouri Attorney General election =

- November 3, 1896

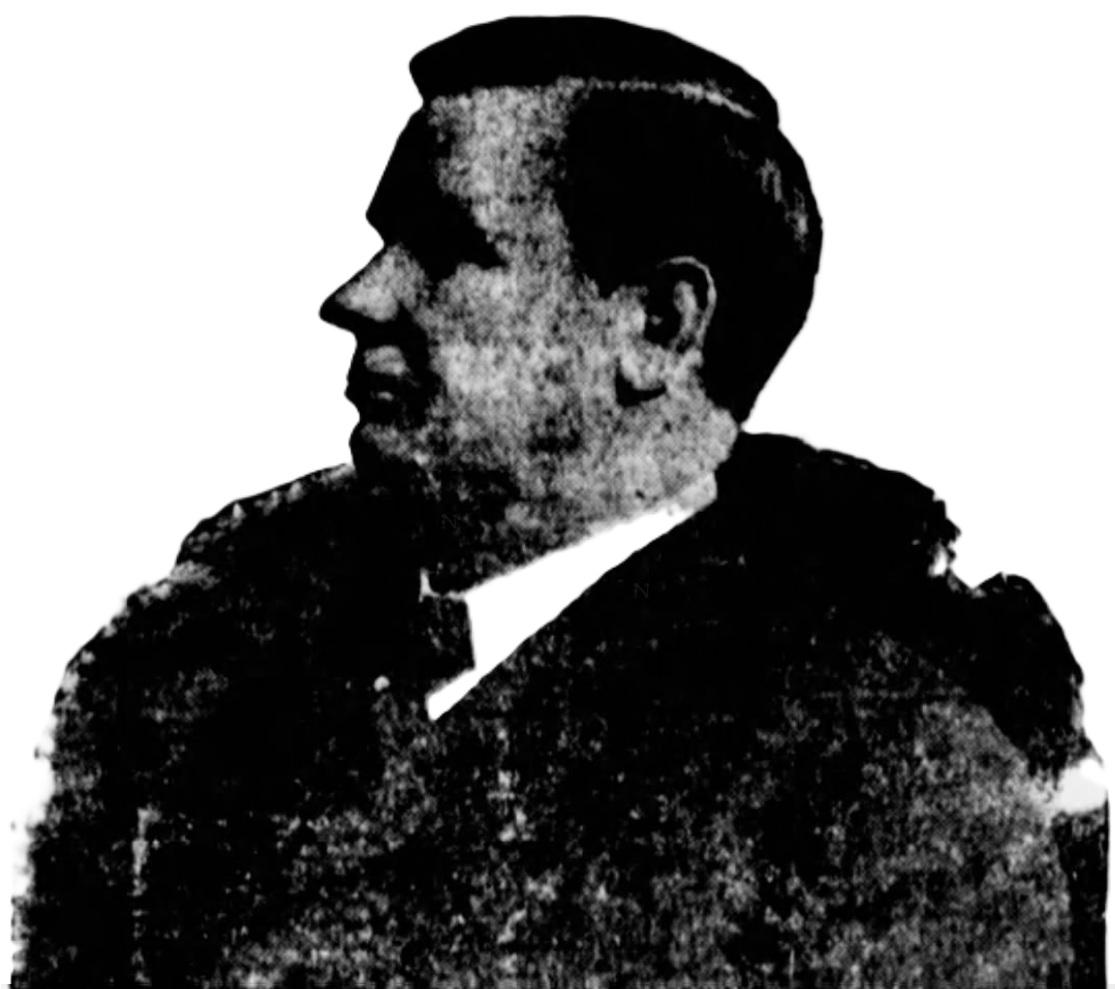
| Nominee | Edward Coke Crow | John Kennish |
| Party | Democratic | Republican |
| Popular vote | 340,585 | 304,686 |
| Percentage | 50.58% | 45.25% |
Attorney General before election
Robert F. Walker
Democratic
Elected Attorney General
Edward Coke Crow
Democratic

The 1896 Missouri Attorney General election was held on November 3, 1896, in order to elect the attorney general of Missouri. Democratic nominee Edward Coke Crow defeated Republican nominee John Kennish, People's nominee Frank E. Richey, Prohibition nominee George E. Bowling and National Democratic nominee Nicholas D. Thurmond.

== General election ==
On election day, November 3, 1896, Democratic nominee Edward Coke Crow won the election by a margin of 35,899 votes against his foremost opponent Republican nominee John Kennish, thereby retaining Democratic control over the office of attorney general. Crow was sworn in as the 23rd attorney general of Missouri on January 11, 1897.

=== Results ===
Missouri Attorney General election, 1896
| Party | Candidate | Votes | % |
|---|---|---|---|
| Democratic | Edward Coke Crow | 340,585 | 50.58 |
| Republican | John Kennish | 304,686 | 45.25 |
| Populist | Frank E. Richey | 24,062 | 3.56 |
| Prohibition | George E. Bowling | 2,053 | 0.31 |
| National Democratic | Nicholas D. Thurmond | 2,008 | 0.30 |
| Total votes | | 673,394 | 100.00 |
| Democratic hold | | | |

== See also ==
- 1896 Missouri gubernatorial election
