= 1908 Missouri Attorney General election =

- November 3, 1908
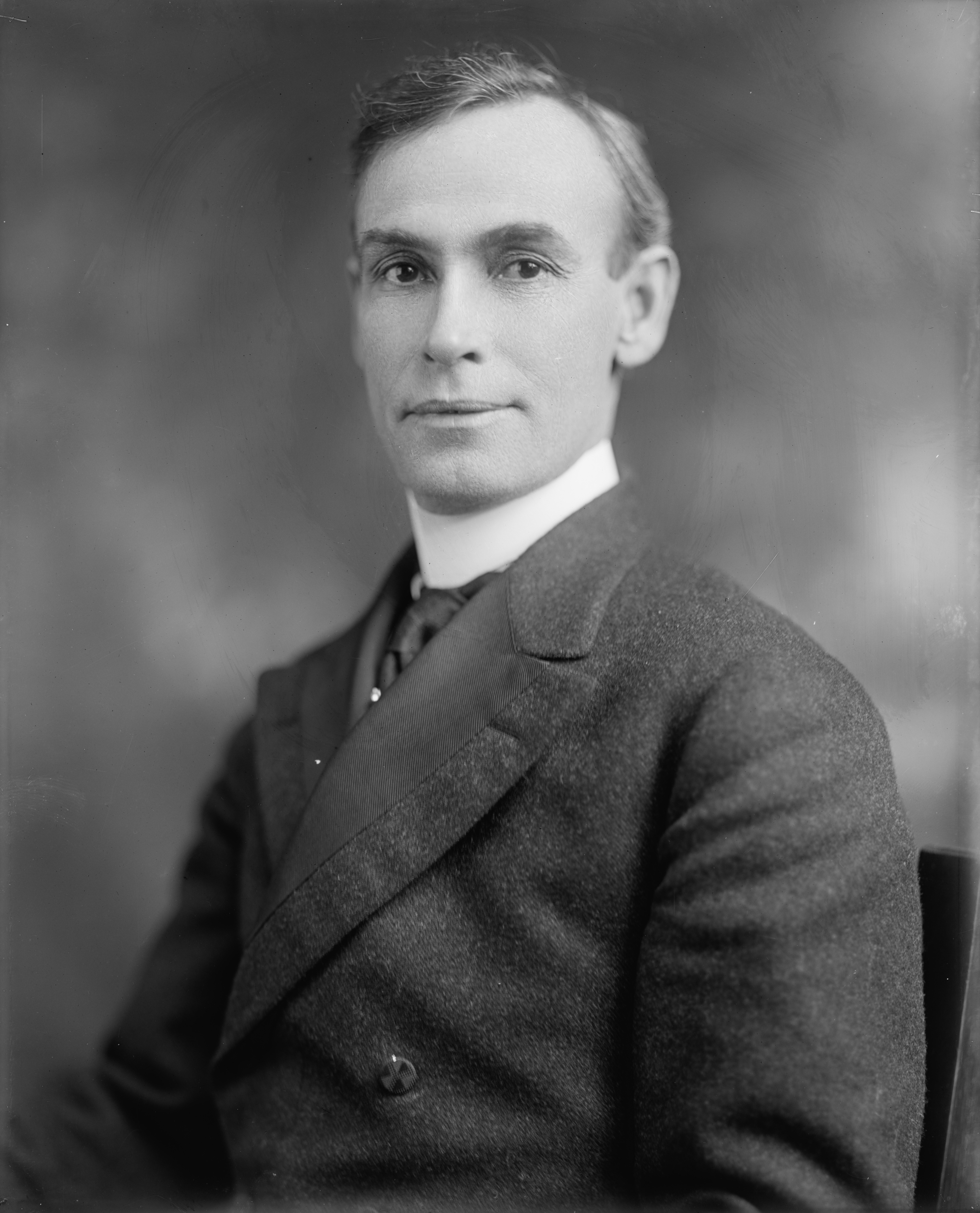

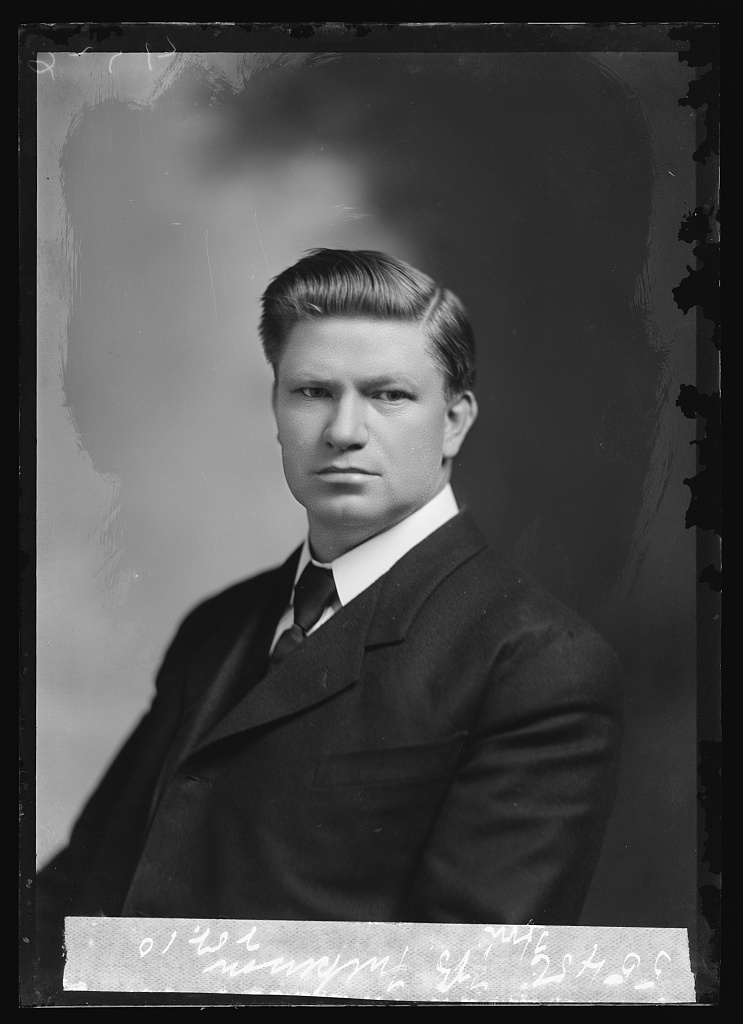
Nominee	Elliott Woolfolk Major	Frank B. Fulkerson
Party	Democratic	Republican
Popular vote	349,123	347,444
Percentage	50.12%	49.88%
Attorney General before election
Herbert S. Hadley
Republican
Elected Attorney General
Elliott Woolfolk Major
Democratic

The 1908 Missouri Attorney General election was held on November 3, 1908, in order to elect the attorney general of Missouri. Democratic nominee and former member of the Missouri Senate Elliott Woolfolk Major defeated Republican nominee and former member of the U.S. House of Representatives from Missouri's 4th district Frank B. Fulkerson.

== General election ==
On election day, November 3, 1908, Democratic nominee Elliott Woolfolk Major won the election by a margin of 1,679 votes against his opponent Republican nominee Frank B. Fulkerson, thereby gaining Democratic control over the office of attorney general. Major was sworn in as the 25th attorney general of Missouri on January 11, 1909.

=== Results ===
Missouri Attorney General election, 1908
Party	Candidate	Votes	%
Democratic	Elliott Woolfolk Major	349,123	50.12
Republican	Frank B. Fulkerson	347,444	49.88
Total votes		696,567	100.00
Democratic gain from Republican			

== See also ==
- 1908 Missouri gubernatorial election
