= 1904 Missouri Attorney General election =

- November 8, 1904
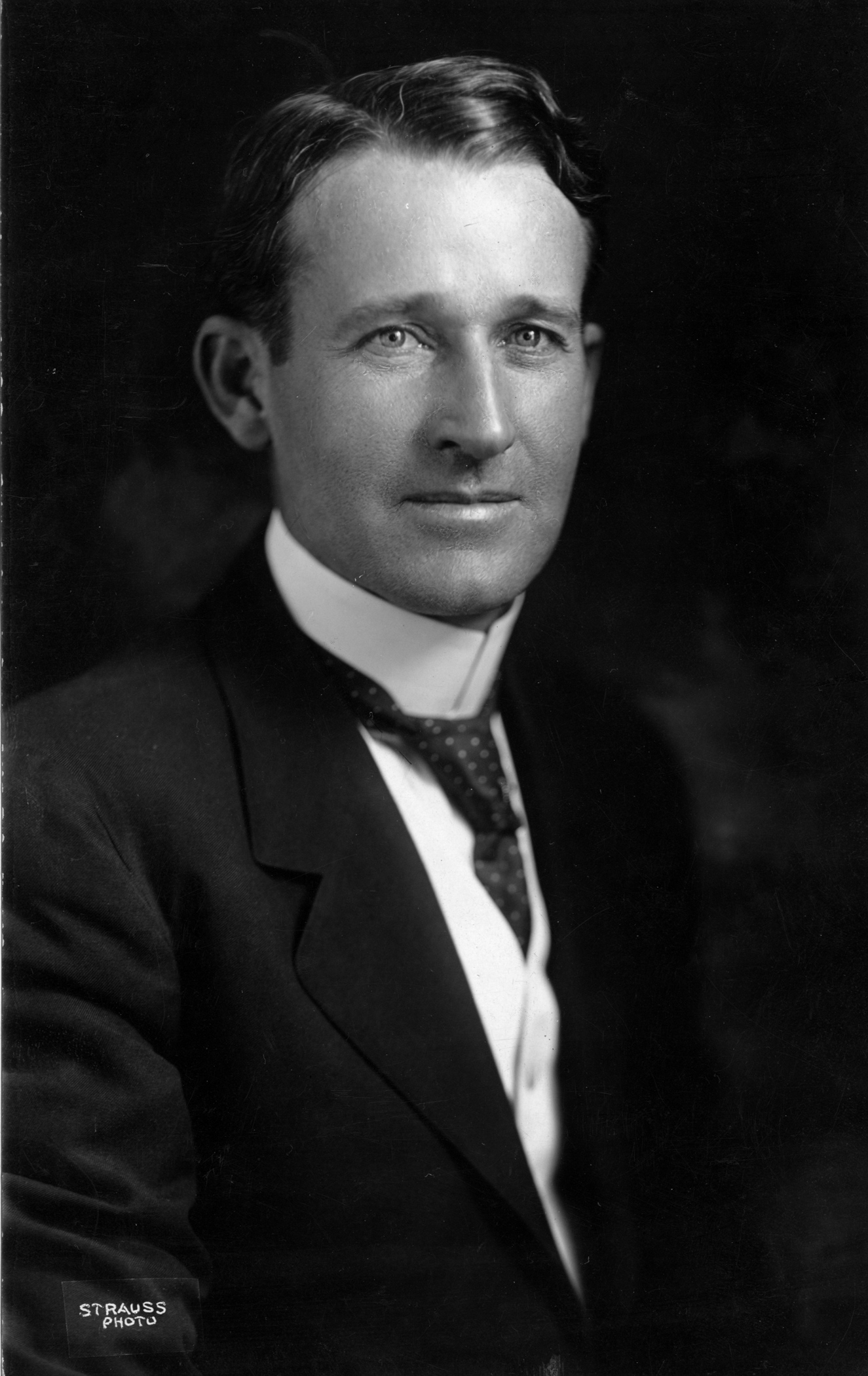

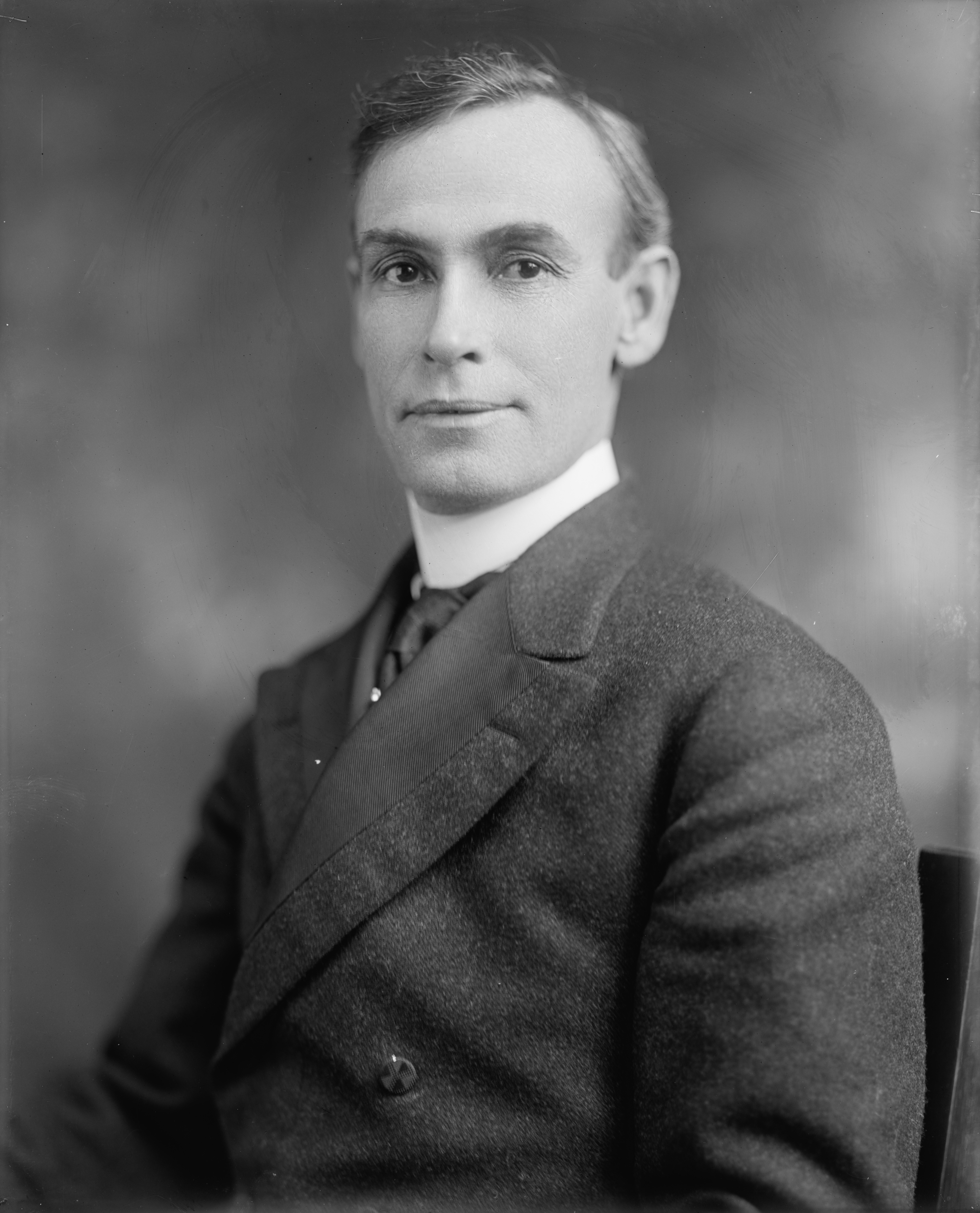
| Nominee | Herbert S. Hadley | Elliott Woolfolk Major |
| Party | Republican | Democratic |
| Popular vote | 316,579 | 303,660 |
| Percentage | 49.10% | 47.10% |
Attorney General before election
Edward Coke Crow
Democratic
Elected Attorney General
Herbert S. Hadley
Republican

The 1904 Missouri Attorney General election was held on November 8, 1904, in order to elect the attorney general of Missouri. Republican nominee Herbert S. Hadley defeated Democratic nominee and former member of the Missouri Senate Elliott Woolfolk Major, socialist nominee George Bullock, Prohibition nominee Austin F. Butts, People's nominee Charles J. Anderson and Socialist Labor nominee Joseph Stief.

== General election ==
On election day, November 8, 1904, Republican nominee Herbert S. Hadley won the election by a margin of 12,919 votes against his foremost opponent Democratic nominee Elliott Woolfolk Major, thereby gaining Republican control over the office of attorney general. Hadley was sworn in as the 24th attorney general of Missouri on January 9, 1905.

=== Results ===
Missouri Attorney General election, 1904
| Party | Candidate | Votes | % |
|---|---|---|---|
| Republican | Herbert S. Hadley | 316,579 | 49.10 |
| Democratic | Elliott Woolfolk Major | 303,660 | 47.10 |
| Socialist | George Bullock | 12,431 | 1.93 |
| Prohibition | Austin F. Butts | 6,887 | 1.07 |
| Populist | Charles J. Anderson | 3,599 | 0.56 |
| Socialist Labor | Joseph Stief | 1,550 | 0.24 |
| Total votes | | 644,709 | 100.00 |
| Republican gain from Democratic | | | |

== See also ==
- 1904 Missouri gubernatorial election
