= List of attorneys general of Missouri =

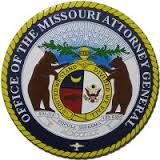
Seal of the Office of the Missouri Attorney General

The individuals listed below have all served in the position of Missouri Attorney General.

== List ==
Parties

Democratic (28) Republican (14) Democratic-Republican (2) Whig (1)

#	Name	Party	Term
1	Edward Bates	Democratic-Republican	1820–1821
2	Rufus Easton	Democratic-Republican	1821–1826
3	Robert W. Wells	Democratic	1826–1836
4	William B. Napton	Democratic	1836–1839
5	Samuel Mansfield Bay	Democratic	1839–1845
6	Benjamin F. Stringfellow	Democratic	1845–1849
7	William A. Robards	Democratic	1849–1851
8	James B. Gardenhire	Whig	1851–1857
9	Ephraim B. Ewing	Democratic	1857–1858
10	J. Proctor Knott	Democratic	1858–1861
11	Aikman Welch	Democratic	1861–1864
12	Thomas T. Crittenden	Democratic	1864
13	Robert F. Wingate	Democratic	1865–1869
14	Horace P. Johnson	Republican	1869–1871
15	Andrew J. Baker	Republican	1871–1872
16	H. Clay Ewing	Democratic	1873–1875
17	John A. Hockaday	Democratic	1875–1877
18	Jackson L. Smith	Democratic	1877–1881
19	Daniel H. McIntyre	Democratic	1881–1885
20	Banton G. Boone	Democratic	1885–1889
21	John M. Wood	Democratic	1889–1893
22	Robert F. Walker	Democratic	1893–1897
23	Edward C. Crow	Democratic	1897–1905
24	Herbert S. Hadley	Republican	1905–1909
25	Elliott W. Major	Democratic	1909–1913
26	John T. Barker	Democratic	1913–1917
27	Frank Winton McAllister	Democratic	1917–1921
28	Jesse W. Barrett	Republican	1921–1925
29	Robert William Otto	Republican	1925
30	North Todd Gentry	Republican	1925–1928
31	Stratton Shartel	Republican	1928–1933
32	Roy McKittrick	Democratic	1933–1945
33	Buck Taylor	Democratic	1945–1953
34	John M. Dalton	Democratic	1953–1961
35	Thomas Eagleton	Democratic	1961–1965
36	Norman H. Anderson	Democratic	1965–1969
37	John Danforth	Republican	1969–1977
38	John Ashcroft	Republican	1977–1985
39	William L. Webster	Republican	1985–1993
40	Jay Nixon	Democratic	1993–2009
41	Chris Koster	Democratic	2009–2017
42	Josh Hawley	Republican	2017–2019
43	Eric Schmitt	Republican	2019–2023
44	Andrew Bailey	Republican	2023–2025
45	Catherine Hanaway	Republican	2025–present
