= 1908 Missouri State Auditor election =

- November 3, 1908

Nominee	John Pemberton Gordon	Jesse A. Tolerton
Party	Democratic	Republican
Popular vote	349,346	346,513
Percentage	50.20%	49.80%
State Auditor before election
William Werner Wilder
Republican
Elected State Auditor
John Pemberton Gordon
Democratic

The 1908 Missouri State Auditor election was held on November 3, 1908, in order to elect the state auditor of Missouri. Democratic nominee John Pemberton Gordon defeated Republican nominee Jesse A. Tolerton.

== General election ==
On election day, November 3, 1908, Democratic nominee John Pemberton Gordon won the election by a margin of 2,833 votes against his opponent Republican nominee Jesse A. Tolerton, thereby gaining Democratic control over the office of state auditor. Gordon was sworn in as the 22nd state auditor of Missouri on January 11, 1909.

=== Results ===
Missouri State Auditor election, 1908
Party	Candidate	Votes	%
Democratic	John Pemberton Gordon	349,346	50.20
Republican	Jesse A. Tolerton	346,513	49.80
Total votes		695,859	100.00
Democratic gain from Republican			

== See also ==
- 1908 Missouri gubernatorial election
