= 1888 Missouri Attorney General election =

- November 6, 1888

Nominee	John M. Wood	L. L. Bridges
Party	Democratic	Republican
Popular vote	261,814	252,163
Percentage	50.50%	48.64%
Attorney General before election
Banton G. Boone
Democratic
Elected Attorney General
John M. Wood
Democratic

The 1888 Missouri Attorney General election was held on November 6, 1888, in order to elect the attorney general of Missouri. Democratic nominee John M. Wood defeated Republican nominee L. L. Bridges and Prohibition nominee George E. Bowling.

== General election ==
On election day, November 6, 1888, Democratic nominee John M. Wood won the election by a margin of 9,651 votes against his foremost opponent Republican nominee L. L. Bridges, thereby retaining Democratic control over the office of attorney general. Wood was sworn in as the 21st attorney general of Missouri on January 14, 1889.

=== Results ===
Missouri Attorney General election, 1888
Party	Candidate	Votes	%
Democratic	John M. Wood	261,814	50.50
Republican	L. L. Bridges	252,163	48.64
Prohibition	George E. Bowling	4,464	0.86
Total votes		518,441	100.00
Democratic hold			

== See also ==
- 1888 Missouri gubernatorial election
