= 1908 Missouri Secretary of State election =

- November 3, 1908

Nominee	Cornelius Roach	John Ephraim Swanger
Party	Democratic	Republican
Popular vote	348,186	347,413
Percentage	50.06%	49.94%
Secretary of State before election
John Ephraim Swanger
Republican
Elected Secretary of State
Cornelius Roach
Democratic

The 1908 Missouri Secretary of State election was held on November 3, 1908, in order to elect the secretary of state of Missouri. Democratic nominee Cornelius Roach defeated Republican nominee and incumbent secretary of state John Ephraim Swanger.

== General election ==
On election day, November 3, 1908, Democratic nominee Cornelius Roach won the election by a margin of 773 votes against his opponent Republican nominee John Ephraim Swanger, thereby gaining Democratic control over the office of secretary of state. Roach was sworn in as the 22nd secretary of state of Missouri on January 11, 1909.

=== Results ===
Missouri Secretary of State election, 1908
Party	Candidate	Votes	%
Democratic	Cornelius Roach	348,186	50.06
Republican	John Ephraim Swanger (incumbent)	347,413	49.94
Total votes		695,599	100.00
Democratic gain from Republican			

== See also ==
- 1908 Missouri gubernatorial election
