= 1892 Missouri Attorney General election =

- November 8, 1892
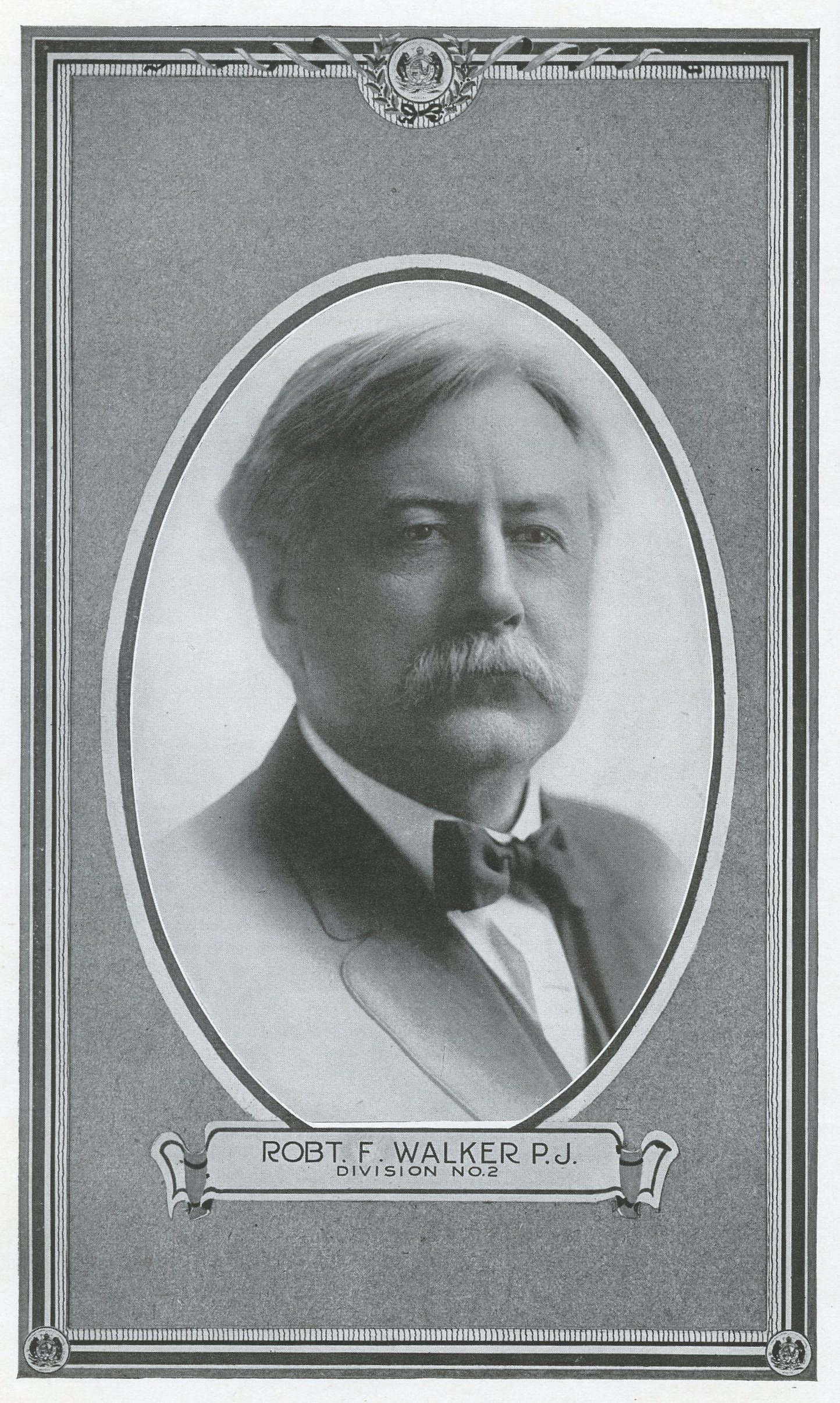

Nominee	Robert F. Walker	David Murphy	William R. Littell
Party	Democratic	Republican	Populist
Popular vote	267,885	228,144	40,856
Percentage	49.52%	42.18%	7.55%
Attorney General before election
John M. Wood
Democratic
Elected Attorney General
Robert F. Walker
Democratic

The 1892 Missouri Attorney General election was held on November 8, 1892, in order to elect the attorney general of Missouri. Democratic nominee Robert F. Walker defeated Republican nominee David Murphy, People's nominee William R. Littell and Prohibition nominee Walter Emmett Johnson.

== General election ==
On election day, November 8, 1892, Democratic nominee Robert F. Walker won the election by a margin of 39,741 votes against his foremost opponent Republican nominee David Murphy, thereby retaining Democratic control over the office of attorney general. Walker was sworn in as the 22nd attorney general of Missouri on January 9, 1893.

=== Results ===
Missouri Attorney General election, 1892
Party	Candidate	Votes	%
Democratic	Robert F. Walker	267,885	49.52
Republican	David Murphy	228,144	42.18
Populist	William R. Littell	40,856	7.55
Prohibition	Walter Emmett Johnson	4,066	0.75
Total votes		540,951	100.00
Democratic hold			

== See also ==
- 1892 Missouri gubernatorial election
