= 1884 Missouri Attorney General election =

- November 4, 1884
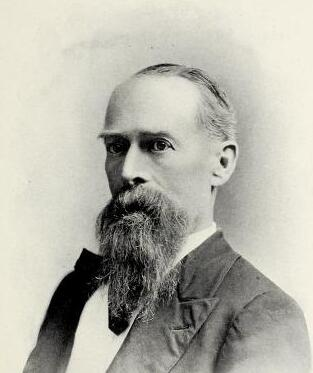

Nominee	Banton G. Boone	Dan Murphy
Party	Democratic	Republican
Popular vote	Unknown	Unknown
Percentage	Unknown	Unknown
Attorney General before election
Daniel H. McIntyre
Democratic
Elected Attorney General
Banton G. Boone
Democratic

The 1884 Missouri Attorney General election was held on November 4, 1884, in order to elect the attorney general of Missouri. Democratic nominee and former speaker of the Missouri House of Representatives Banton G. Boone defeated Republican nominee Dan Murphy. The exact results of the election are unknown.

== General election ==
On election day, November 4, 1884, Democratic nominee Banton G. Boone won the election against his opponent Republican nominee Dan Murphy, thereby retaining Democratic control over the office of attorney general. Boone was sworn in as the 20th attorney general of Missouri on January 12, 1885.

=== Results ===
Missouri Attorney General election, 1884
Party	Candidate	Votes	%
Democratic	Banton G. Boone	Unknown	Unknown
Republican	Dan Murphy	Unknown	Unknown
Total votes		Unknown	100.00
Democratic hold			

== See also ==
- 1884 Missouri gubernatorial election
