= 1900 Missouri Attorney General election =

- November 6, 1900

Nominee	Edward Coke Crow	Samuel F. O'Fallon
Party	Democratic	Republican
Popular vote	352,517	314,065
Percentage	51.64%	46.01%
Attorney General before election
Edward Coke Crow
Democratic
Elected Attorney General
Edward Coke Crow
Democratic

The 1900 Missouri Attorney General election was held on November 6, 1900, in order to elect the attorney general of Missouri. Democratic nominee and incumbent attorney general Edward Coke Crow defeated Republican nominee Samuel F. O'Fallon, Social Democratic nominee John F. Delaney, Prohibition nominee Lewis G. Adams and People's Progressive nominee Zachary Taylor.

== General election ==
On election day, November 6, 1900, Democratic nominee Edward Coke Crow won re-election by a margin of 38,452 votes against his foremost opponent Republican nominee Samuel F. O'Fallon, thereby retaining Democratic control over the office of attorney general. Crow was sworn in for his second term on January 14, 1901.

=== Results ===
Missouri Attorney General election, 1900
Party	Candidate	Votes	%
Democratic	Edward Coke Crow (incumbent)	352,517	51.64
Republican	Samuel F. O'Fallon	314,065	46.01
Social Democratic	John F. Delaney	6,146	0.90
Prohibition	Lewis G. Adams	5,616	0.82
People's Progressive Party	Zachary Taylor	4,296	0.63
Total votes		682,640	100.00
Democratic hold			

== See also ==
- 1900 Missouri gubernatorial election
