= Samantha Littlefield Huntley =

Samantha Littlefield Huntley (1865–1949) was a portrait artist who lived and worked in the Eastern United States and Italy during the early part of the 20th Century.

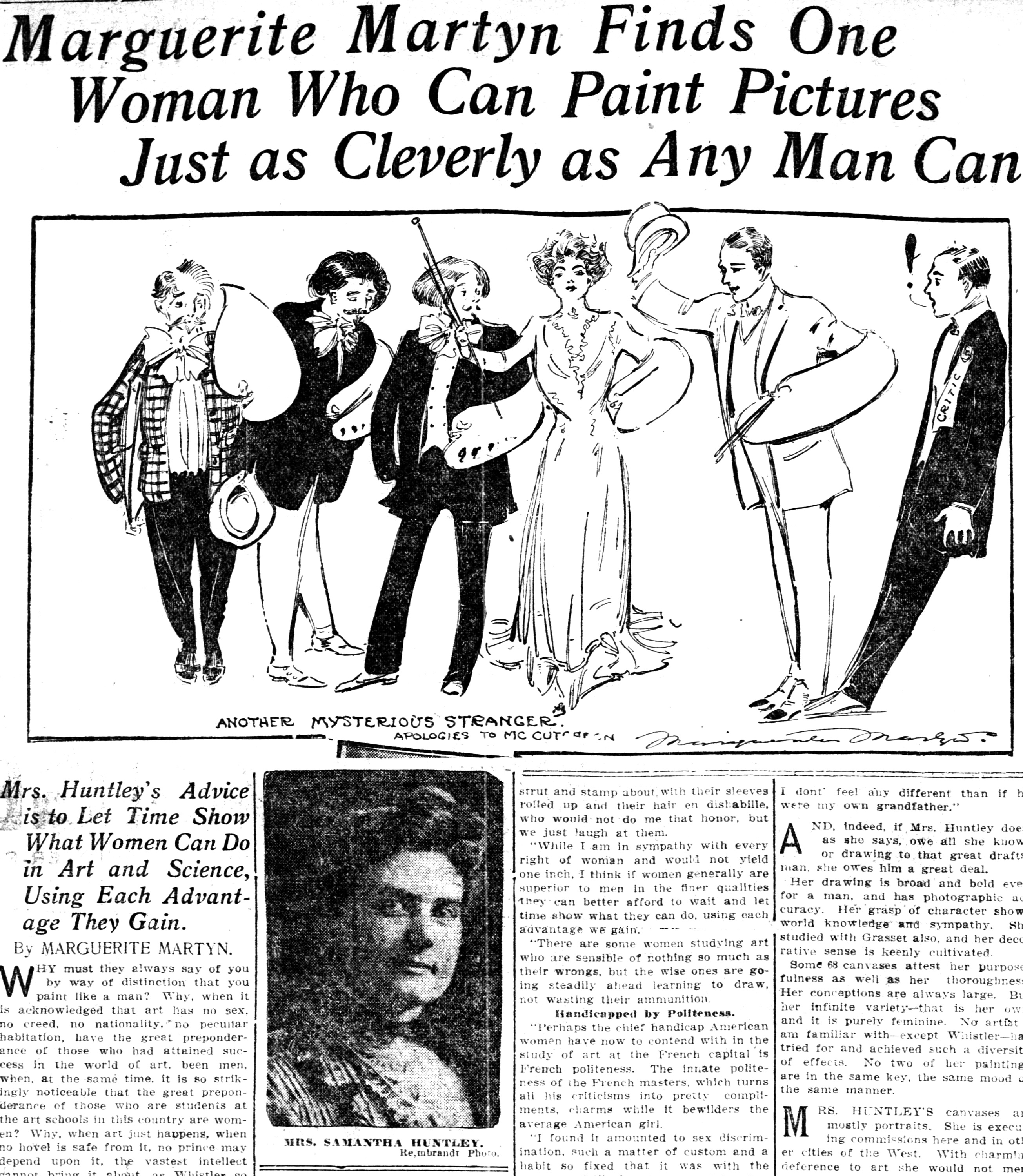
Portion of St. Louis Post-Dispatch page of November 28, 1909, featuring a headline and an imaginative sketch and part of an article, both by Marguerite Martyn, concerning her interview with artist Samantha Huntley.

== Personal life ==
Samantha Littlefield was born either in West Troy, New York, or Watervliet, New York, on or about May 16, 1865, to Edgar Littlefield (1836–1923) and Abigail Fidelia Tilley (1846-1904). She had a sister, Grace Littlefield Dunham.

She was married to Frank Hall Huntley. They had a son, Grant Huntley (1887–1953), who was a civil engineer and became a professor at Union College.

According to her passport applications in 1905 and 1907, she stood 5 feet, 4-1/2 inches, and had brown hair with blue eyes. She had a full face with "rather dark" complexion and a "rather decided" chin. Her witness on both occasions was Abigail M. Littlefield.

In 1912, she was living in Albany, New York, and in 1913 and 1915 she was in Rome, Italy.

Huntley died in Manhattan, New York, at the age of 84 on June 20, 1949. She was buried in Albany Rural Cemetery, Menands, New York.

== Education ==
Huntley studied with artists Jules Lefebvre and Eugène Grasset in Paris, France.

While with Lefebvre, she noticed that her instructor, in line with the "innate politeness of the French masters," was giving her "pretty compliments" instead of accurate criticism.

I found it amounted to sex discrimination, such a matter of custom and a habit so fixed that it was with the greatest difficulty I made Jules Lefebvre understand that I had come all the way to Paris to have my faults pointed out, not my perfections.

When at last he did understand, the good man did me the honor to ask me to come to his studio every week with my work for criticism. Then we became such good friends that today, as he writes to me, I don't feel any different than if he were my own grandfather.

== Professional life ==
In 1907, she was an art teacher living at 60 Maple Avenue, Troy, New York. She taught in the Emma Willard School in Buffalo, New York, for "a number of years."

Huntley replied to a 1909 question asked by St. Louis Post-Dispatch journalist Marguerite Martyn as to the reason for a then-current compliment to a woman artist that "she paints just like a man!"

You must remember that the artistic emancipation of woman is not more than 25 years old. The Julian [cq] academies were the first established to benefit women. It is only within twelve years that women have been admitted to the Beaux Arts to study upon equal terms with men. . . . It is my belief that actually the few women who pursue the study of art today are painting better than the majority of men in the profession."

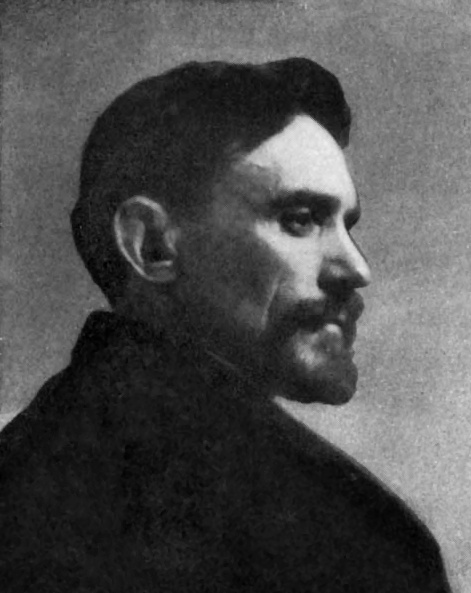
John Vanderpoel by Samantha Huntley

In March 1910, Huntley was in Madison, Wisconsin, where she was painting, then she returned to St. Louis, Missouri, to do some more portraits. She was noted as "a master draughtsman, and one of the most celebrated portrait painters of the day."

In December 1911 twelve of her oil portraits were on display at the Detroit Institute of Arts, three of the subjects being from the Detroit area. They represented DIA director A.H. Griffith and Mrs. Charles L. Palms and Isabel Palms. Another represented John J. Glennon, Catholic archbishop of St. Louis.

She later had studios in Albany, New York; Rochester, New York, and Madison, Wisconsin.

In 1923, she was exhibited among a collection by "much-noted American artists" of paintings of "well known citizens" of Madison, Wisconsin. By 1935, her portrait of artist John Vanderpoel was hanging in a "place of honor in [the] Vanderpoel memorial in Ridge park," Chicago. Other notable people she painted were Wisconsin Senator William F. Vilas and New York Governors Frank W. Higgins and Martin H. Glynn.

== Hadley portrait case ==
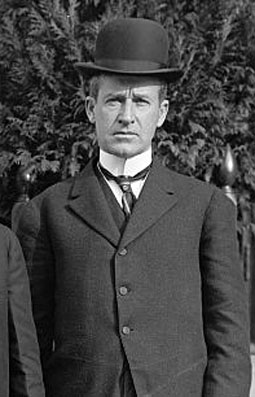
Governor Hadley

A group of supporters of Missouri Governor Herbert Spencer Hadley decided that the Republican Party would pay for a portrait of him. Mrs. Huntley was commissioned to do the work, which was to hang in the state Capitol building or in the Executive Mansion.

Hadley had retained attorney Louis Henry by January 1912. "It appears that the governor's lower lip is fuller than it believed it ought to be and he instructed the artist to remedy it. . . . When the committee charged that the mouth did not look like the governor's, Mrs. Huntley explained that the governor ordered it" to be painted that way. The painting was in storage.

Mrs. Huntley sued Colonel Schoenberg, Sheriff Louis Nolte, General Frank Rumbold and U.S. District Attorney Charles A. Houts, who had suggested the picture be painted. Houts was served with a subpoena at the Great Northern Hotel in Chicago on June 18. Hadley and Nolte were also summonsed into the Cook County, Illinois, Circuit Court to show cause why they should not be compelled to pay $1,500 for the portrait. All were in Chicago for the 1912 Republican National Convention. Only a thousand dollars was received in donations, and she did not receive any of it, a petition by Mrs. Hadley to the Circuit Court asserted.

On June 21, 1912, the St. Louis Post-Dispatch printed excerpts from many letters that Mrs. Huntley had written to a friend in St. Louis while the artist was in Jefferson City to work on the portrait. Hadley was often too busy to pose, Mrs. Huntley wrote, going as long as two weeks without a session. He dictated letters and chewed gum while she tried to paint him. He smoked cigars, which distorted his face and made him difficult to see. He insisted that he be painted wearing a blue tie with white polka dots because that was the style he always wore. They agreed on a solid color tie, but it was later written that the portrait was rejected because the dots were omitted. There was also a disagreement over the shape of the governor's mouth, according to Mrs. Huntley. The St. Louis Star said, "After placing several different mouths on the picture[,] Hadley and his political supporters declared that it did not look much like him," so they refused to pay the artist. In 1913, a committee of the State Legislature refused to pay her bill of $1,185 because it did not look like the governor.

By May 1913, Mrs. Huntley had brought suit for $1,185 against Houts and three other members of the Missouri State Legislature who had refused to pay her bill because the portrait had been changed after its completion. According to Mrs. Huntley, Hadley had ordered her to "modify the hard expression."

After trial, in October 1915 a jury awarded her damages of $900.

== Earthquake relief ==
In January 1915, she led a relief expedition to Avezzano, Italy, where an earthquake had leveled the town. She brought tents and food, and she helped care for survivors in the women's hospital and a girls' school.
