= William B. Teasdale =

American politician and judge (1856–1907)

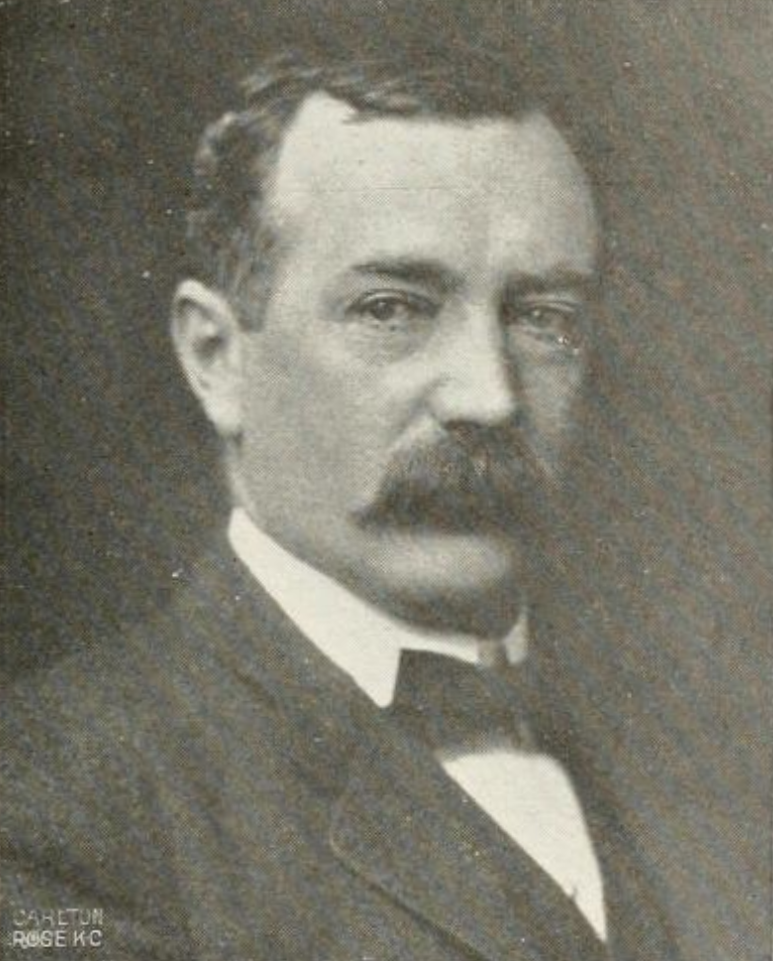
- Teasdale (c. 1902)

Member of the Missouri Senate
- In office 1888

Personal details
- Born: September 12, 1856 Potosi, Missouri, U.S.
- Died: February 13, 1907 (aged 50) St. Louis, Missouri, U.S.
- Party: Democratic
- Spouse: Lydia Guinotte (m. 1883)
- Education: Saint Louis University; Saint Louis University School of Law
- Occupation: Lawyer; judge; politician

William B. Teasdale (September 12, 1856 – February 13, 1907) was a Missouri lawyer, judge and politician. He served in the Missouri Senate in 1888.

== Early life ==
William B. Teasdale was born on September 12, 1856, in Potosi, Missouri. He attended public schools in Potosi. Teasdale graduated from Saint Louis University. He then graduated with a law degree at Saint Louis University School of Law in 1887.

== Career ==
Teasdale moved to St. Louis in 1879. After graduating from law school, Teasdale practiced law in Potosi for two years. In 1881, William H. Wallace appointed Teasdale as Assistant Prosecutor.

Teasdale was a Democrat. He was elected as justice of the peace. Teasdale was elected to the Missouri Senate in 1888. While senator, he served on the judiciary committee.

In 1889, Teasdale, R. J. Ingraham and William S. Cowherd formed the law firm Teasdale, Ingraham & Cowherd. He remained with the law firm until 1899. In March 1902, Teasdale was appointed to the Jackson County Circuit Court. He served with the court until his death.

== Personal life ==
Teasdale married Lydia Guinotte in 1883. She was the sister of Judge J. E. Guinotte. Teasdale was a Catholic.

Teasdale suffered from intense pain and traveled to New York City in July 1906 to seek treatment. He also sought treatment at St. Anne's Shrine, a Catholic institution near Quebec. Teasdale died on February 13, 1907, at his 20 Hunter Avenue home in St. Louis.
