= William S. Cowherd =

American politician and lawyer (1860–1915)

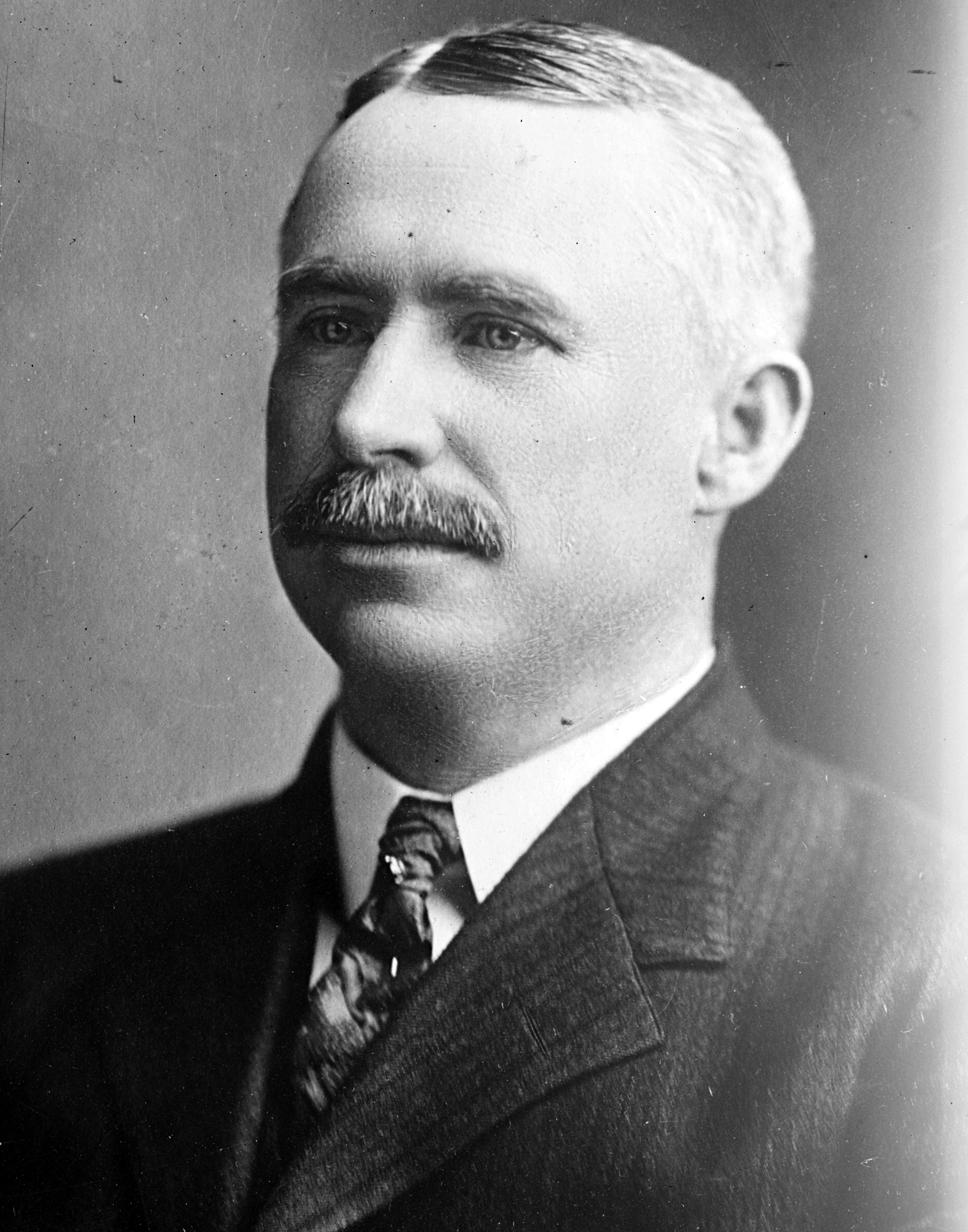

Member of the U.S. House of Representatives from Missouri's 5th district
- In office March 4, 1897 – March 3, 1905
- Preceded by: Robert T. Van Horn
- Succeeded by: Edgar C. Ellis

29th Mayor of Kansas City
- In office 1892–1894
- Preceded by: Benjamin Holmes
- Succeeded by: Webster Davis

Personal details
- Born: William Strother Cowherd; September 1, 1860 near Lee's Summit, Missouri, U.S.
- Died: June 20, 1915 (aged 54) Pasadena, California, U.S.
- Resting place: Lee's Summit Historical Cemetery; Lee's Summit, Missouri, U.S.
- Party: Democratic
- Spouse: Jessie Kitchen (m. 1899)
- Education: University of Missouri (AB, LLB)
- Occupation: Politician; lawyer

William Strother Cowherd (September 1, 1860 – June 20, 1915) was a Democratic mayor of Kansas City, Missouri from 1892–1894 and congressman from Missouri from 1897–1905.

== Early life ==
William Strother Cowherd was born on September 1, 1860, to Emily (née Strother) and Charles J. Cowherd near Lee's Summit, Missouri. He attended schools in Lee's Summit. He graduated from the University of Missouri in 1881 with a Bachelor of Arts and from the law school with a Bachelor of Laws in 1882.

== Career ==
In 1882, Cowherd joined the Tichenor, Warner & Dean law firm. In 1883, Cowherd and John Campbell formed the Cowherd & Campbell law firm on Fifth Street in Kansas City. Cowherd was prosecuting attorney of Jackson County, Missouri from 1885–1889. In 1889, Cowherd formed the Teasdale, Ingraham, & Cowherd law firm with William B. Teasdale and R. J. Ingraham. It was later renamed Cowherd, Ingraham, Durham & Morse. He became first assistant city counselor of Kansas City in 1890. He served as mayor of Kansas City in 1892. He was elected as a Democrat to the Fifty-fifth and to the three succeeding Congresses (March 4, 1897 – March 3, 1905).

After failing to be re-elected to Congress, he ran unsuccessfully for Governor of Missouri in 1908. In 1909, he moved to Pasadena, California, and continued to practice law.

== Personal life ==
Cowherd married Jessie Kitchen of Kansas City on September 25, 1889.

Cowherd died in Pasadena on June 20, 1915. He is buried in Lee's Summit Historical Cemetery.

Party political offices
Preceded by Joseph W. Folk	Democratic nominee for Governor of Missouri; 1908	Succeeded by Elliot Woolfolk Major
Political offices
Preceded by Benjamin Holmes	Mayor of Kansas City, Missouri; 1892–1894	Succeeded by Webster Davis
U.S. House of Representatives
Preceded by Robert T. Van Horn	United States Representative for the 5th congressional district of Missouri; 1897–1905	Succeeded by Edgar C. Ellis
