= Berryman Henwood =

American judge (1881–1955)

Berryman Henwood (April 23, 1881 – March 7, 1955) was a justice of the Supreme Court of Missouri from 1930 to 1932.

== Early life, education, and career ==
Born in Hannibal, Missouri, to George W. and Jennie (Dunham) Henwood, one of six children, Henwood attended the local schools in Hannibal, and then became a student in the law department of the University of Missouri, graduating cum laude in 1904.

While pursuing his law studies he also took a three-year special course in political science and public law under Dr. Loeb, of the academic department. Henwood opened a law office in Hannibal in 1904 and was employed by the Hannibal Street Railway Company and successfully secured a right of way to Oakwood.

== Political and judicial career ==
In the fall of 1904, he was nominated for the office of prosecuting attorney of Marion County on the Republican ticket, but was defeated in the strongly Democratic county. He was made assistant chief clerk of the forty-third general assembly. He also was elected city attorney of Hannibal in 1909 and again in 1911, and was elected by the city council as city counsellor in 1909 and again in 1911. He served as a special judge in several important cases in Ralls County and Marion County. In 1909 Henwood compiled the revision of the city ordinances of the city of Hannibal.

From 1909 until 1913, he led the successful campaign for the purchase of the waterworks by the city. During his service as city attorney he successfully defended Hannibal in its levee case before the supreme court. In 1913 he joined Charles T. Hays and H. Clay Heather in forming the firm of Hays, Heather & Henwood. Henwood was a delegate to Republican state conventions beginning in 1906. In 1912 and 1914 he was made a member of the state republican central committee and has twice declined the chairmanship for business reasons. He was recognized as "one of the active and influential republicans in northeastern Missouri". Heywood served as a delegate to the 1916 Republican National Convention.

In April 1927, he became commissioner of the supreme court, and in December 1930 was appointed by Governor Henry S. Caulfield to fill a seat on the supreme court vacated by the death of justice Robert F. Walker. The appointment was "met with universal approval", and returned Republicans to a majority on the court for the first time in two decades. On April 5, 1932, Henwood announced that he would not seek reelection to the court. He was succeeded by a Democrat, shifting the majority back to that party.

After leaving the court, he formed a new firm in St. Louis with Mark Eagleton and James A. Waechter. In 1935, he opened a law office in Jefferson City, and in 1936 was appointed trustee of the Cotton Belt by Judge Charles B. Davis of the United States District Court for the Eastern District of Missouri.

== Personal life ==
On October 17, 1907, Henwood married Adele Tucker of Hannibal, with whom he had two daughters, and one son. His wife died in 1927, and his son was killed in World War II, in Okinawa.

Henwood had a stroke in the early 1950s, and died from heart disease in a hospital in Jefferson City, Missouri, at the age of 73.

Political offices
Preceded by Robert F. Walker	Justice of the Missouri Supreme Court; 1930–1932	Succeeded by Ernest M. Tipton
