= John Kennish =

American judge (1857–1921)

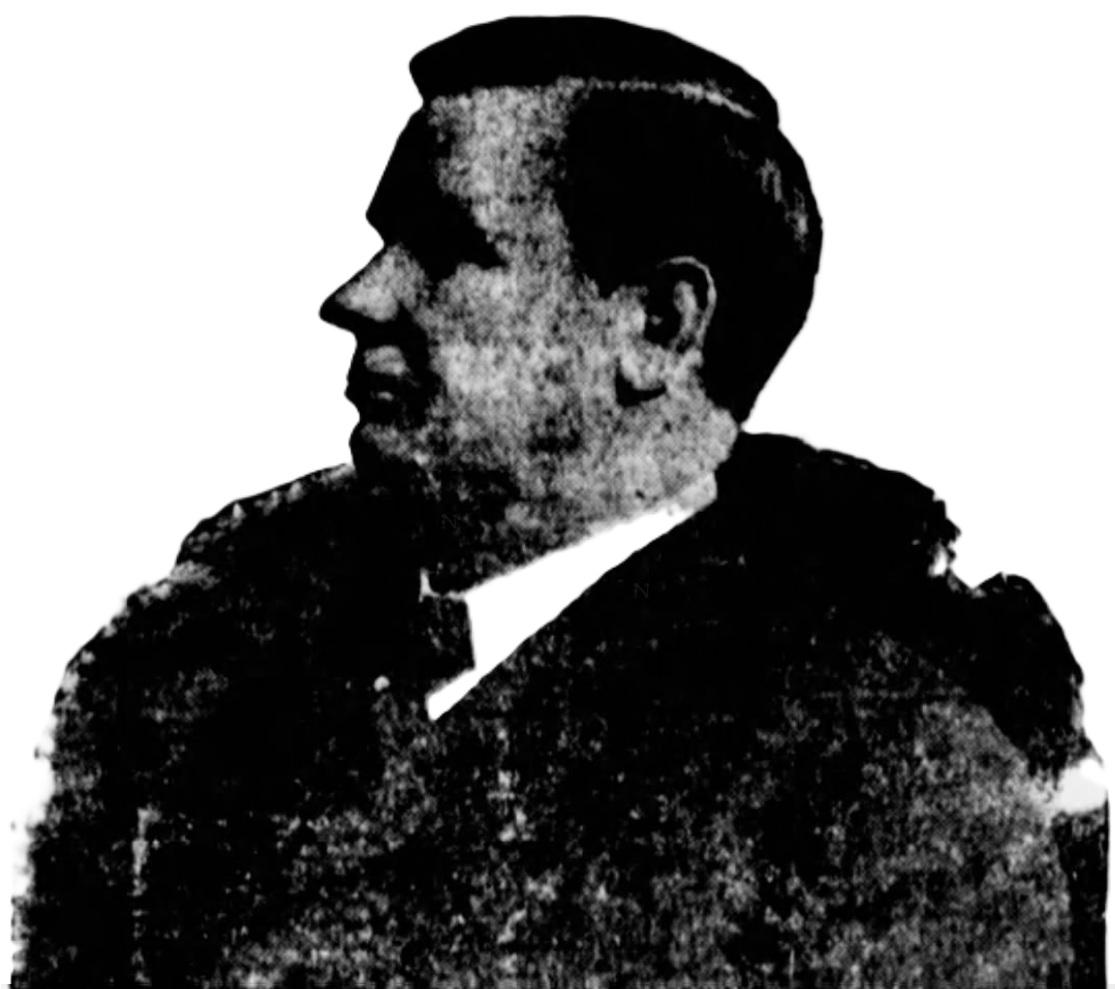
Judge John Kennish

John M. Kennish (November 11, 1857 – September 14, 1921) was an American lawyer, politician, and judge who served in the Missouri Senate and as a justice of the Supreme Court of Missouri from 1910 to 1913.

== Early life, education, and career ==
Born on the Isle of Man to William and Catherine Callow Kennish, his father was a minister in the Primitive Methodist Church of England who became affiliated with the Methodist Episcopal Church after immigrating to the United States in 1877. Kennish came to the United States with his family at the age of thirteen, in 1870, settling in Liberty Township, Holt County, Missouri. He attended local district schools and later enrolled at the University of Missouri, graduating from the law department in 1884, and entering the practice of law in Mound City, Missouri.

Kennish was elected city attorney there, and in 1888, he was elected prosecuting attorney of Holt County, serving from 1889 to 1891.

== Political and judicial career ==
In 1892, Kennish was elected to the Missouri State Senate as a Republican. During his term, he was known for "antagonizing an organized combine then in control of that body". Kennish was the Republican nominee for Missouri Attorney General in 1896, though he was defeated during a strong Democratic election year in the state. In 1900, without solicitation on his part, he was nominated by the Republican Party for a seat in the United States Congress in Missouri's Fourth Congressional District. In 1904, when Herbert S. Hadley was elected attorney general, he named Kennish as his first assistant, and Kennish was very active in the prosecution of cases against large corporations, serving in that capacity until 1908.

In 1906, Kennish was the Republican nominee for the Missouri Supreme Court. He was only able to campaign in a limited area, and was defeated by Judge Archelaus Marius Woodson, losing by fewer than 10,000 votes out of over 592,000 case statewide. In 1908, he ran unsuccessfully in the United States Senate Republican primary, receiving a large vote in the country districts. By 1909, Hadley had become governor of Missouri, and appointed Kennish superintendent of insurance. Following the death of Missouri Supreme Court judge James David Fox, Hadley appointed Kennish to the state supreme court to fill the vacancy until January 1911. In 1910, Kennish was elected to continue on the court for the remainder of the term, serving until its expiration in 1912.

In 1913 Governor Major named him as a member of the state public service commission, which position he held for three years, when he resigned to return to Kansas City to re-enter his legal practice. In August 1920, he was again appointed to the state public service commission, resigning in December of that year become master in chancery in the Kansas City Railway receivership, serving in that capacity until his death.

== Personal life and death ==
On June 10, 1896, Kennish married Nellie Offut, daughter of H. C. Offut, in Kansas City. They had no children.

He died at the Walnut street entrance to the Commerce Trust Company in Kansas City, at the age of 63. His death was reportedly "caused by kidney trouble", and the report stated that: "After a few minutes' conversation Judge Goodrich turned to enter the building. Judge Kennish started to walk away. He had taken only a few steps when he fell to the sidewalk", where he died within minutes.

Political offices
Preceded by James David Fox	Justice of the Missouri Supreme Court; 1910–1913	Succeeded by Robert F. Walker
