= 1912 Republican National Convention =

American political convention

- 1912 presidential election
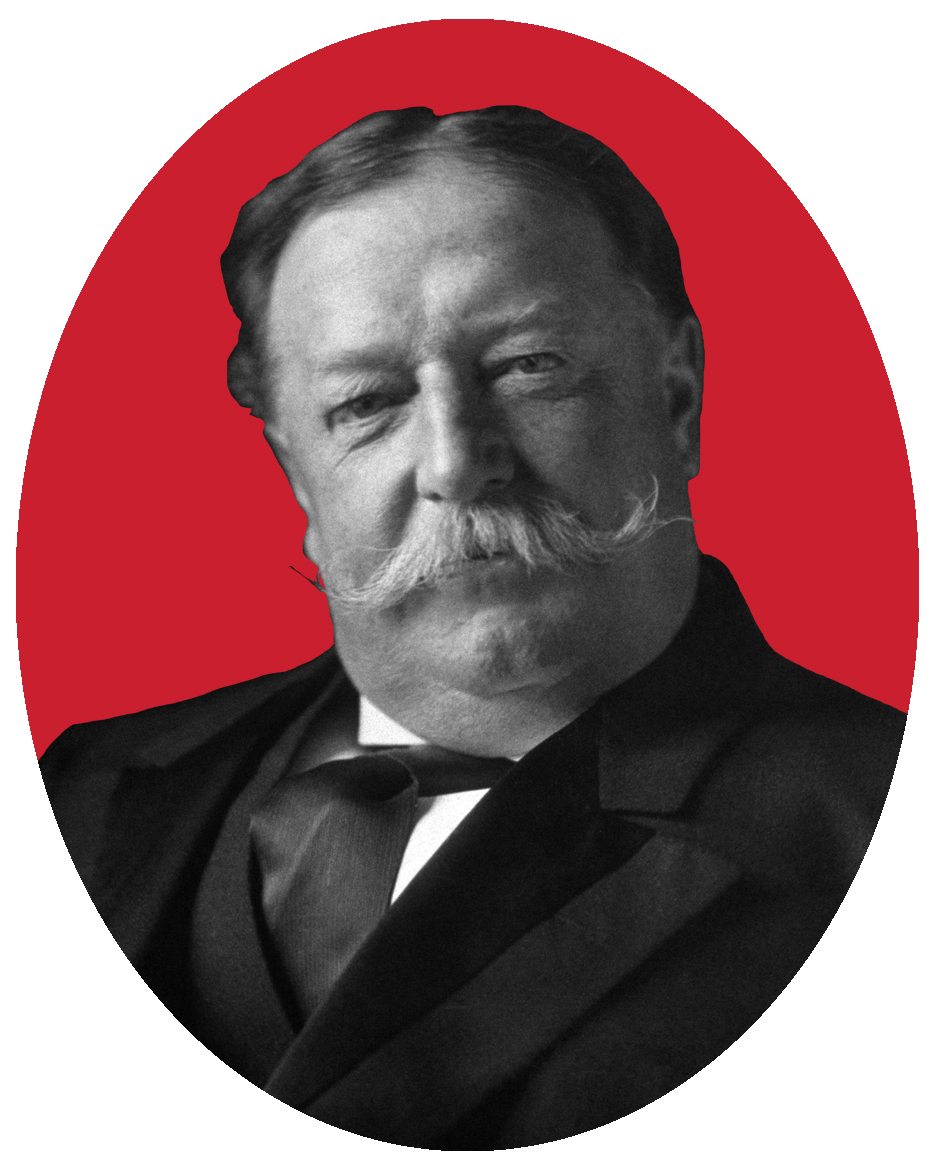
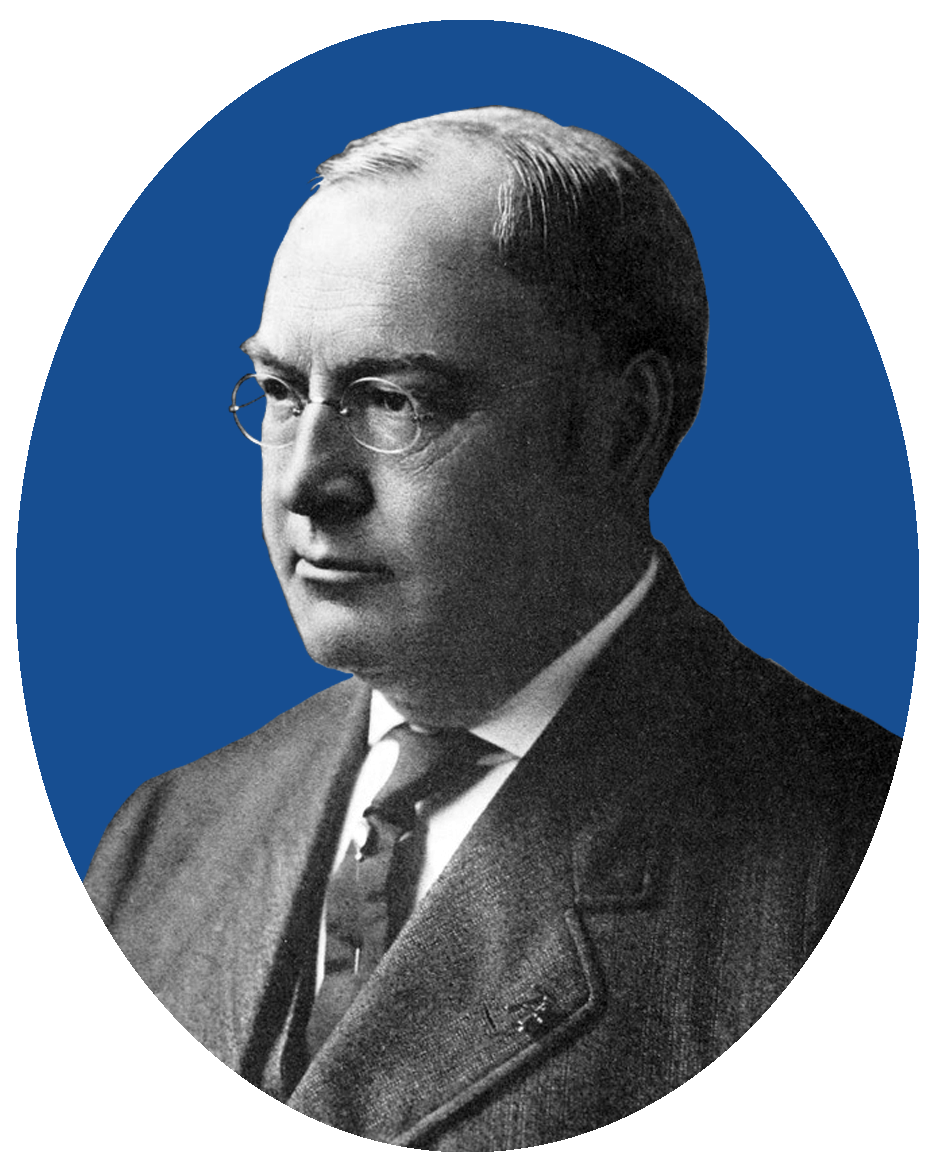
- Nominees; Taft and Sherman

Convention
- Dates: June 18–22, 1912
- City: Chicago, Illinois
- Venue: Chicago Coliseum
- Keynote speaker: Elihu Root of New York

Candidates
- Presidential nominee: William Howard Taft of Ohio
- Vice-presidential nominee: James S. Sherman of New York

The 1912 Republican National Convention was held at the Chicago Coliseum, Chicago, Illinois, from June 18 to June 22, 1912. The party nominated President William Howard Taft and Vice President James S. Sherman for re-election for the 1912 United States presidential election.

Sherman died days before the election, and was replaced as Republican vice-presidential nominee by Nicholas Murray Butler of New York. The ticket went on to place 3rd in the November election behind former president Theodore Roosevelt, who ran under the banner of the new Progressive or "Bull Moose" Party, and Democratic governor Woodrow Wilson.

== Background ==
This convention marked the climax of a split in the party, resulting from a power struggle between incumbent Taft and former president Theodore Roosevelt that started in 1910. Politically liberal states for the first time were holding Republican primaries. Though Roosevelt had endorsed Taft as his successor, Taft's drift to the right (along with Roosevelt's increasingly more Progressive ideas) had alienated Roosevelt, who launched a challenge to Taft's re-nomination. Roosevelt overwhelmingly won the primaries — winning 9 out of 13 states. Both Taft and Roosevelt lost their home states to each other. Senator Robert M. La Follette, a reformer, won two states, including his home state of Wisconsin. Through the primaries, Senator La Follette won a total of 36 delegates; President Taft won 48 delegates; and Roosevelt won 278 delegates. However, 36 more conservative states did not hold primaries, but instead selected delegates via state conventions. For years Roosevelt had tried to attract Southern white Democrats to the Republican Party, and he tried to win delegates there in 1912. However, Taft had the support of black Republicans in the South, and defeated Roosevelt there.

== Convention ==
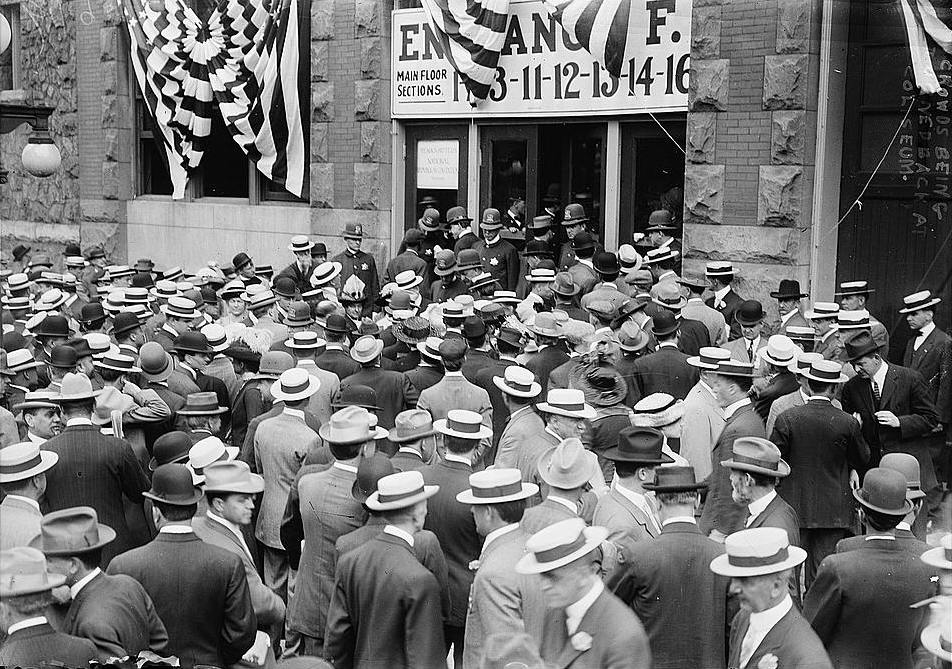
Crowd outside the convention hall

Entering the convention, the Roosevelt and Taft forces seemed evenly matched, and a compromise candidate seemed possible. Taft was willing to compromise with Missouri governor Herbert S. Hadley as presidential nominee; Roosevelt said no.

The first major battle of the convention was won by Taft's camp, with Taft-ally Elihu Root (senator from New York) being elected the temporary chairman of the convention in a 558–502 vote. As temporary chairman, Root was able to deliver the convention's keynote address. In his address, Root touted successes of the Taft administration and called for party unity.

The Taft and Roosevelt camps engaged in a fight for the delegations of various states, with Taft emerging victorious, and Roosevelt claiming that several delegations were fraudulently seated because of the machinations of conservative party leaders including William Barnes Jr. and Boies Penrose. Roosevelt then accused Taft of steamroller tactics and ordered his supporters to take no further part in the convention. Following the seating of the anti-Roosevelt delegations, California governor Hiram Johnson proclaimed that progressives would form a new party to nominate Roosevelt. Roosevelt ultimately ran a third party campaign as part of the Progressive Party (nicknamed the "Bull Moose Party"). Taft and Roosevelt both lost the 1912 election to the Democratic nominee, Woodrow Wilson.

Delegations from the south acted as rotten boroughs due to their size despite having no influence in elections. An attempt to reduce their influence failed in 1908, with Roosevelt having fought against it. The southern delegations, whose 252 delegates accounted for almost half of the number needed to win the nomination, almost entirely supported Taft.

== Presidential nomination ==
=== Presidential candidates ===
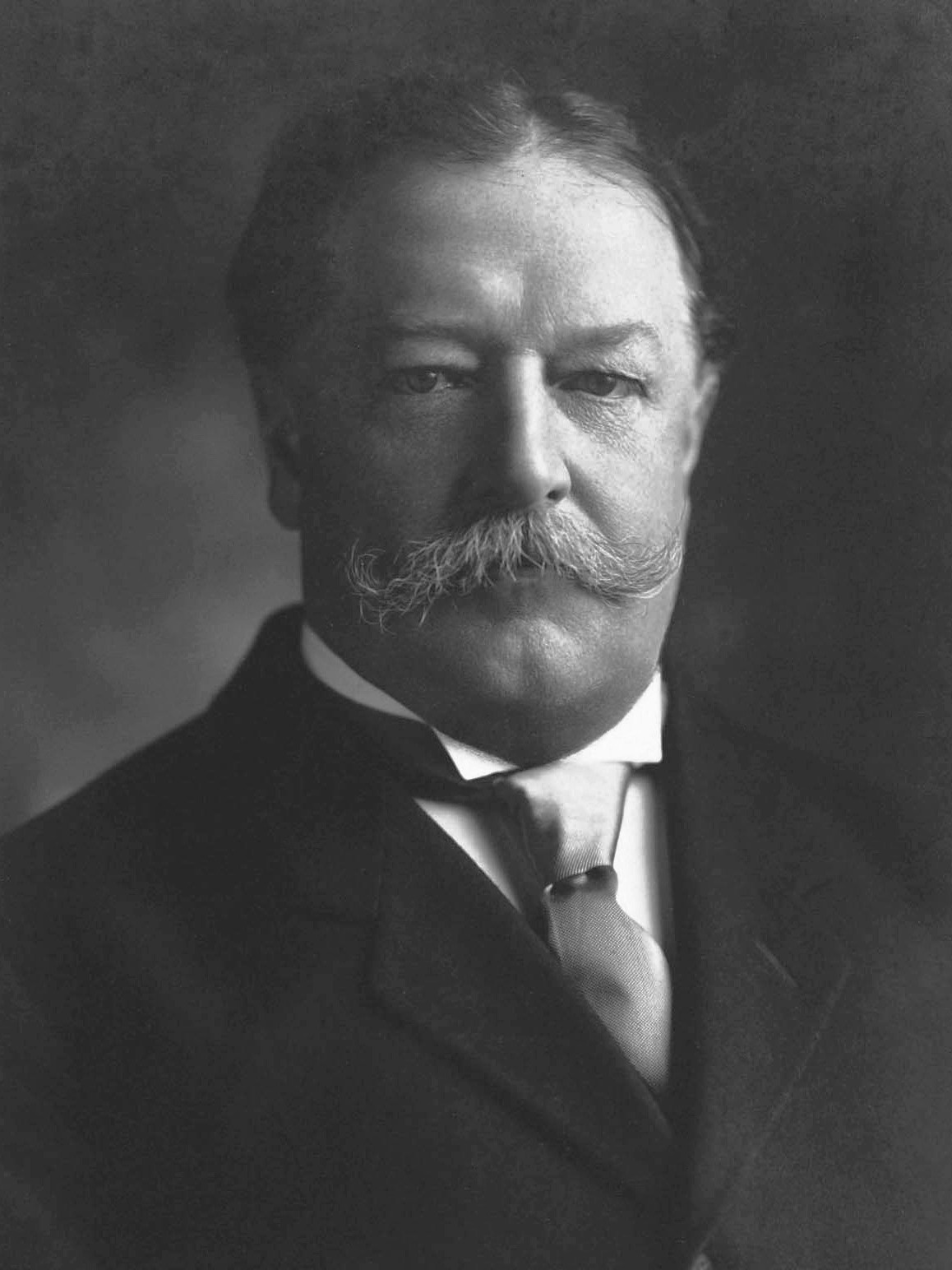
President
William Howard Taft
of Ohio

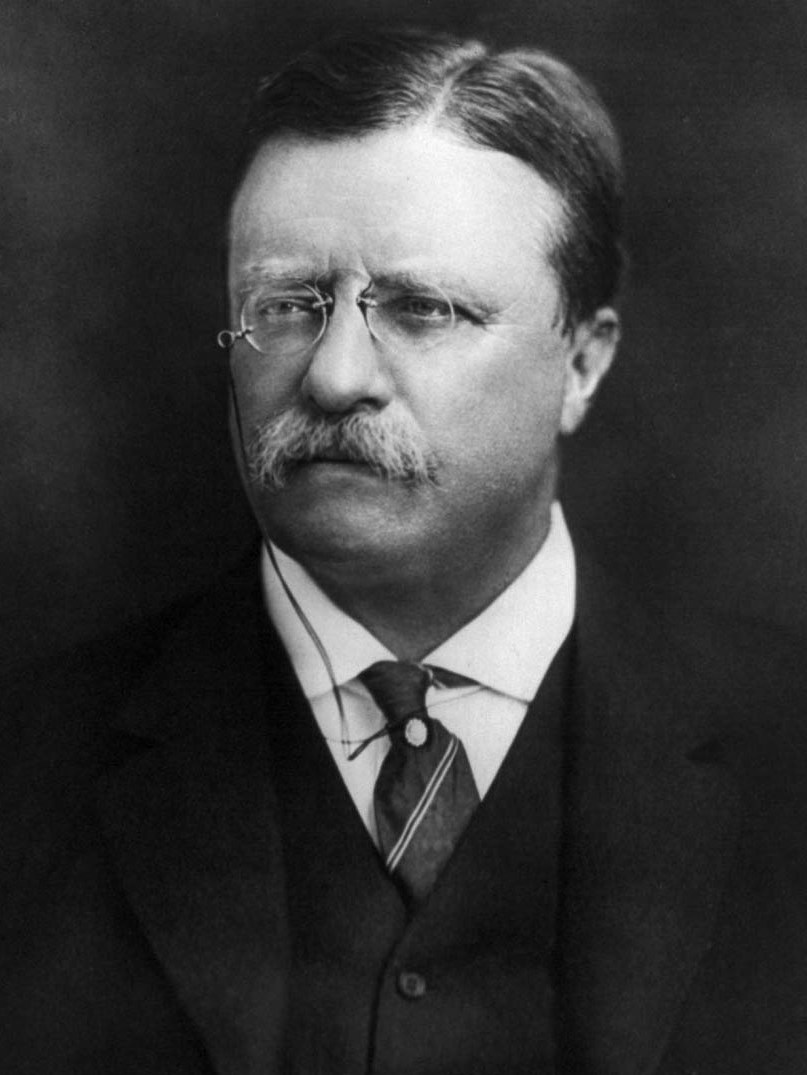
Former President
Theodore Roosevelt
of New York
(not nominated)

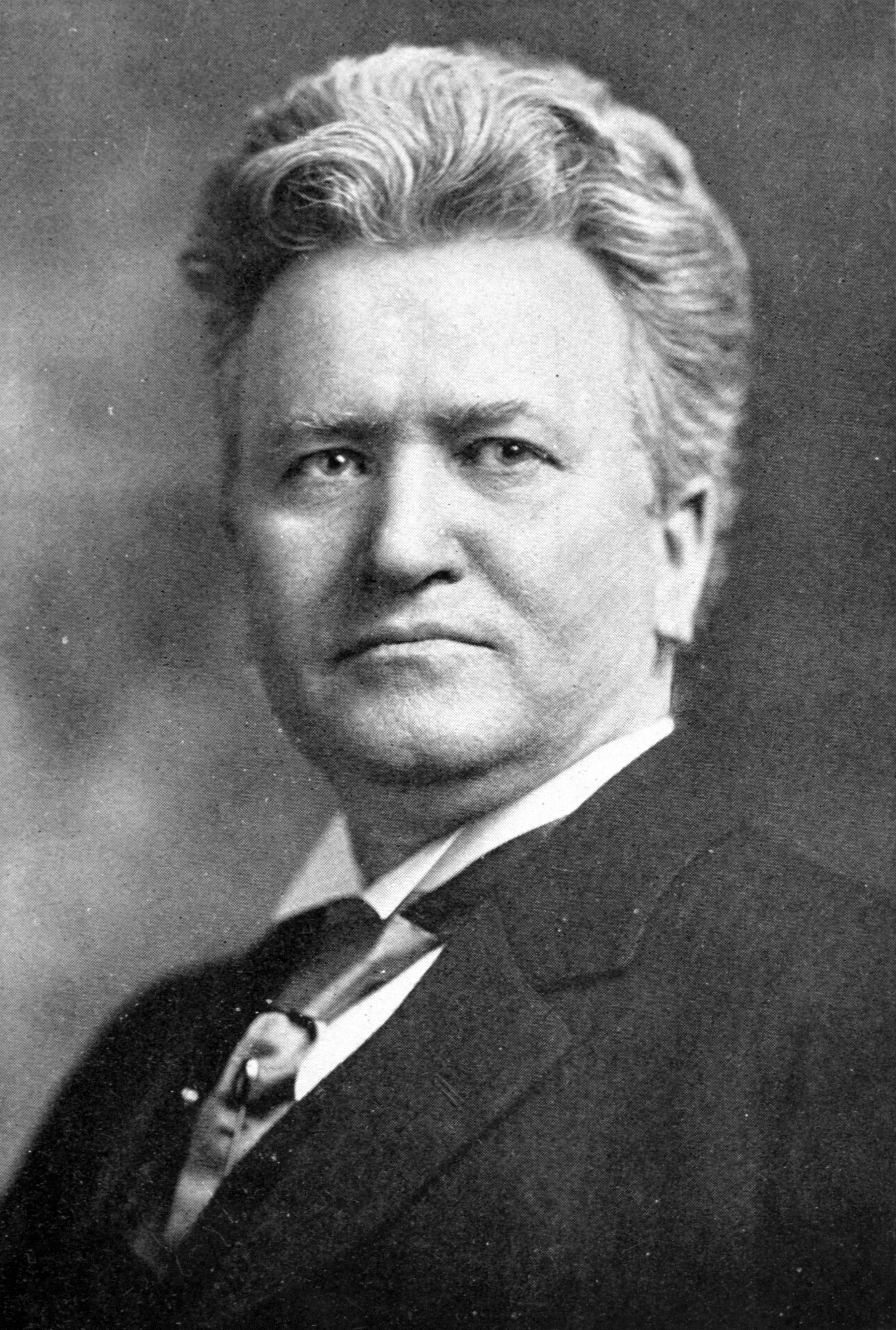
Senator
Robert M. La Follette
of Wisconsin

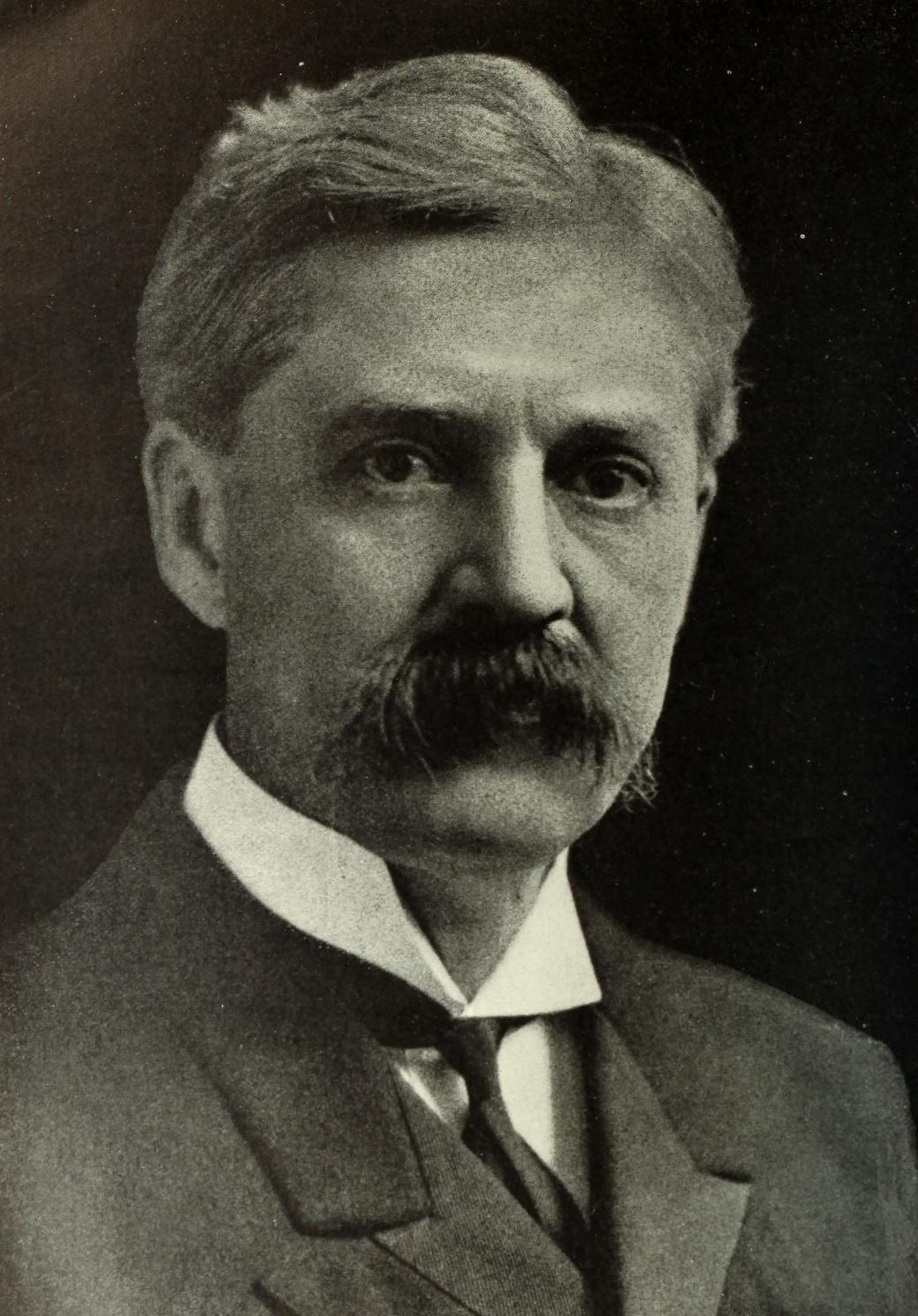
Senator
Albert B. Cummins
of Iowa
(not nominated)

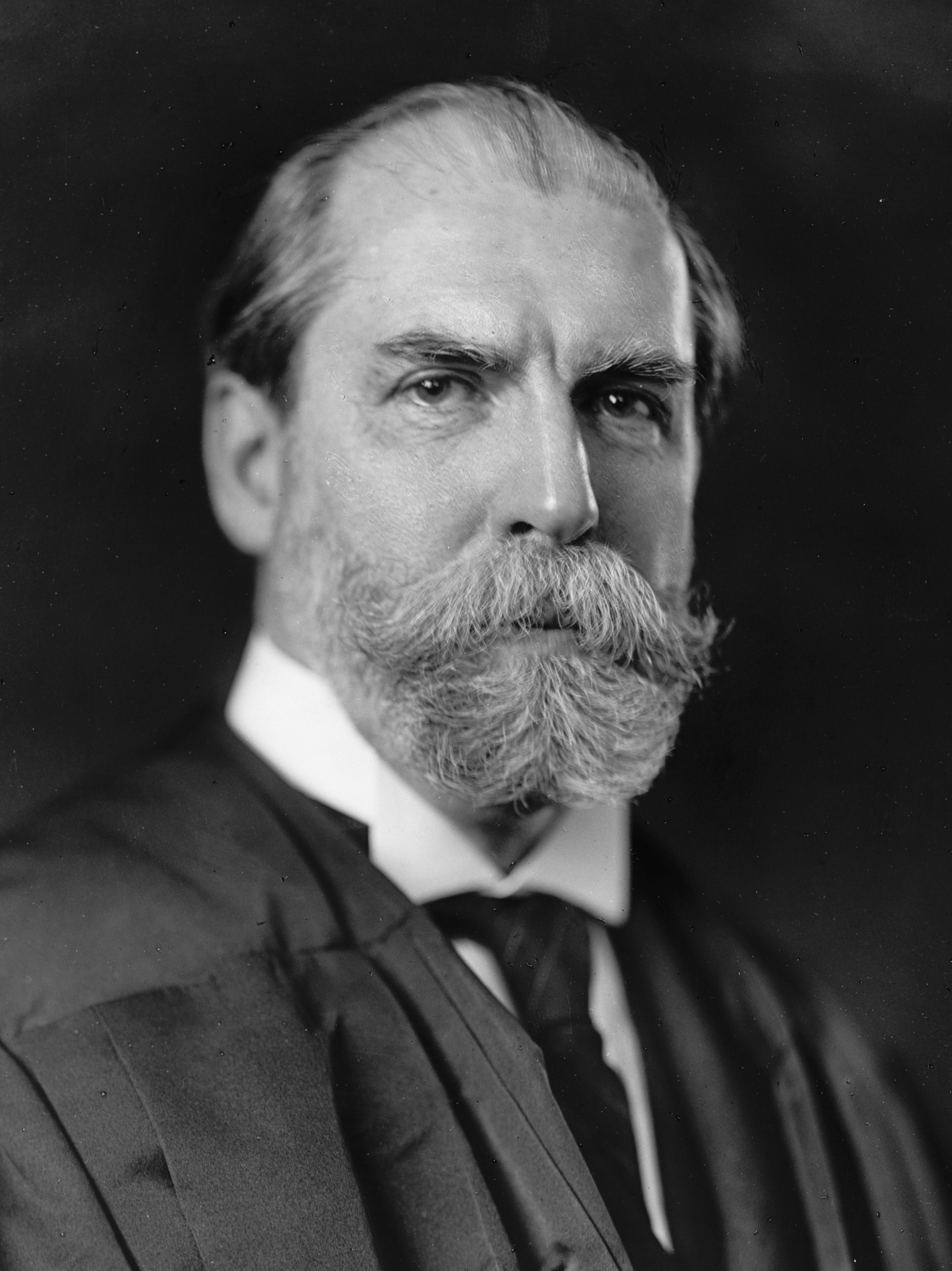
Associate Justice
Charles Evans Hughes
of New York
(not nominated)

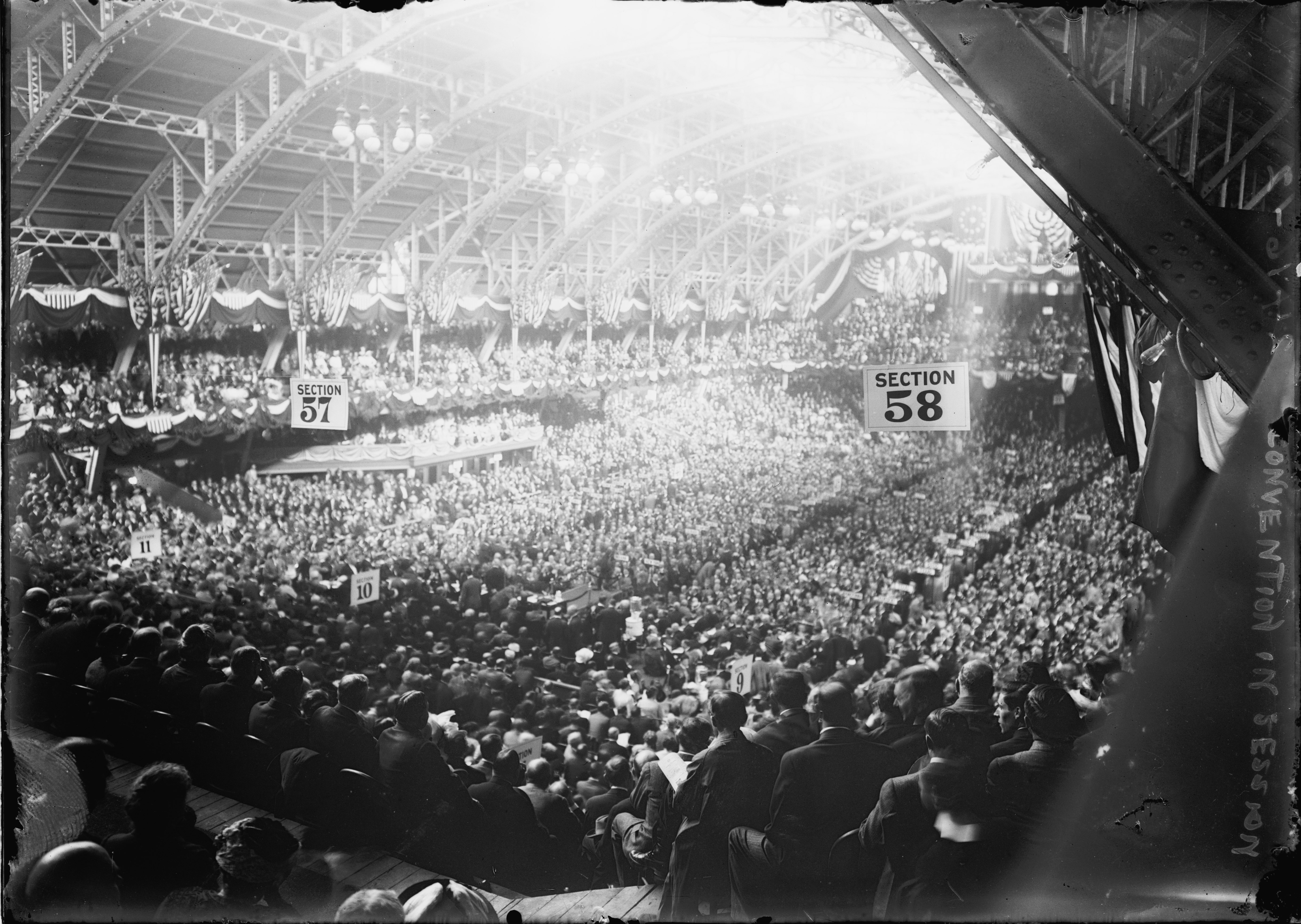
The 1912 Republican National Convention in session

Though many of Roosevelt's delegates remained at the convention, most refused to take part in the presidential ballot in protest of the contested delegates. Additionally, Roosevelt's name was not placed in nomination. Thus, Taft was re-nominated handily on the first ballot.

Presidential balloting
Candidate	1st
Taft	561
Roosevelt	107
La Follette	41
Cummins	17
Hughes	2
Not voting	344
Absent	6

Presidential balloting / 5th day of convention (June 22, 1912)

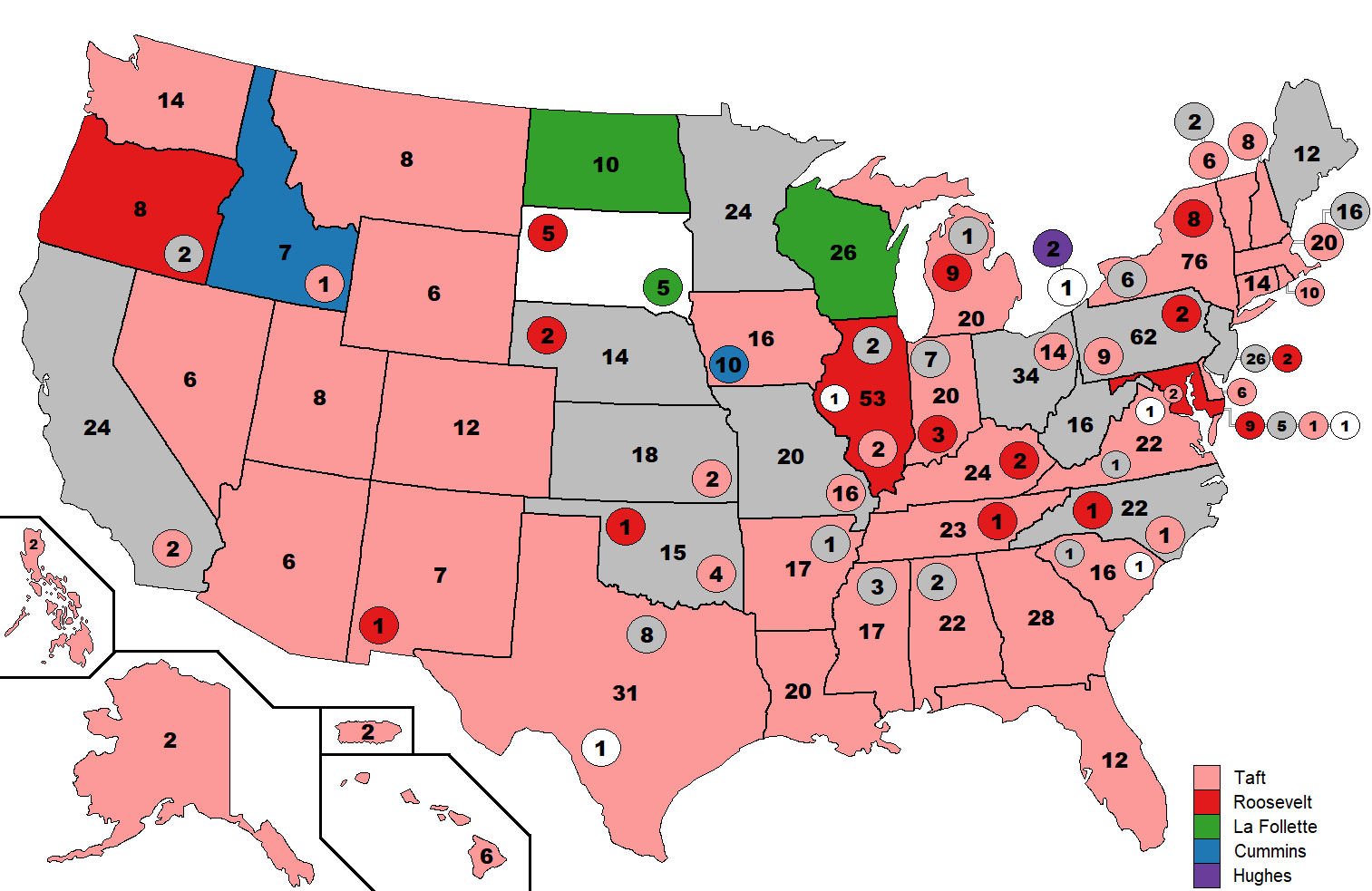
1st presidential ballot

The balloting by states was as follows:

State	Total delegates	Taft	Roosevelt	Cummins	La Follette	Hughes	Not voting	Absent
Alabama	24	22					2	
Arizona	6	6						
Arkansas	18	17					1	
California	26	2					24	
Colorado	12	12						
Connecticut	14	14						
Delaware	6	6						
Florida	12	12						
Georgia	28	28						
Idaho	8	1		7				
Illinois	58	2	53				2	1
Indiana	30	20	3				7	
Iowa	26	16		10				
Kansas	20	2					18	
Kentucky	26	24	2					
Louisiana	20	20						
Maine	12						12	
Maryland	16	1	9				5	1
Massachusetts	36	20					16	
Michigan	30	20	9				1	
Minnesota	24						24	
Mississippi	20	17					3	
Missouri	36	16					20	
Montana	8	8						
Nebraska	16		2				14	
Nevada	6	6						
New Hampshire	8	8						
New Jersey	28		2				26	
New Mexico	8	7	1					
New York	90	76	8				6	
North Carolina	24	1	1				22	
North Dakota	10				10			
Ohio	48	14					34	
Oklahoma	20	4	1				15	
Oregon	10		8				2	
Pennsylvania	76	9	2			2	62	1
Rhode Island	10	10						
South Carolina	18	16					1	1
South Dakota	10		5		5			
Tennessee	24	23	1					
Texas	40	31					8	1
Utah	8	8						
Vermont	8	6					2	
Virginia	24	22					1	1
Washington	14	14						
West Virginia	16						16	
Wisconsin	26				26			
Wyoming	6	6						
Alaska	2	2						
District of Columbia	2	2						
Hawaii	6	6						
Philippines	2	2						
Puerto Rico	2	2						
Total	1078	561	107	17	41	2	344	6

== Vice presidential nomination ==
=== Vice presidential candidates ===
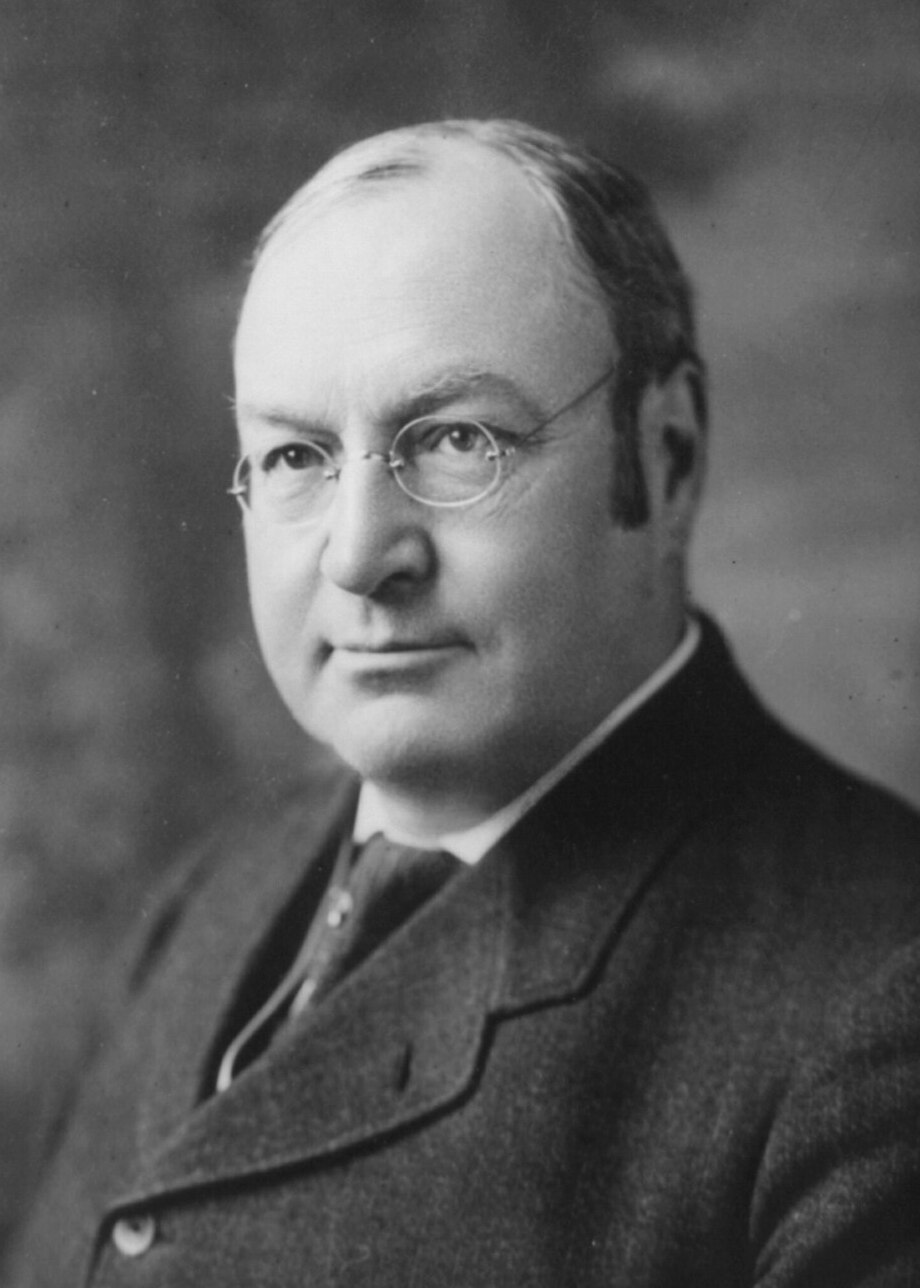
Vice President
James S. Sherman
of New York

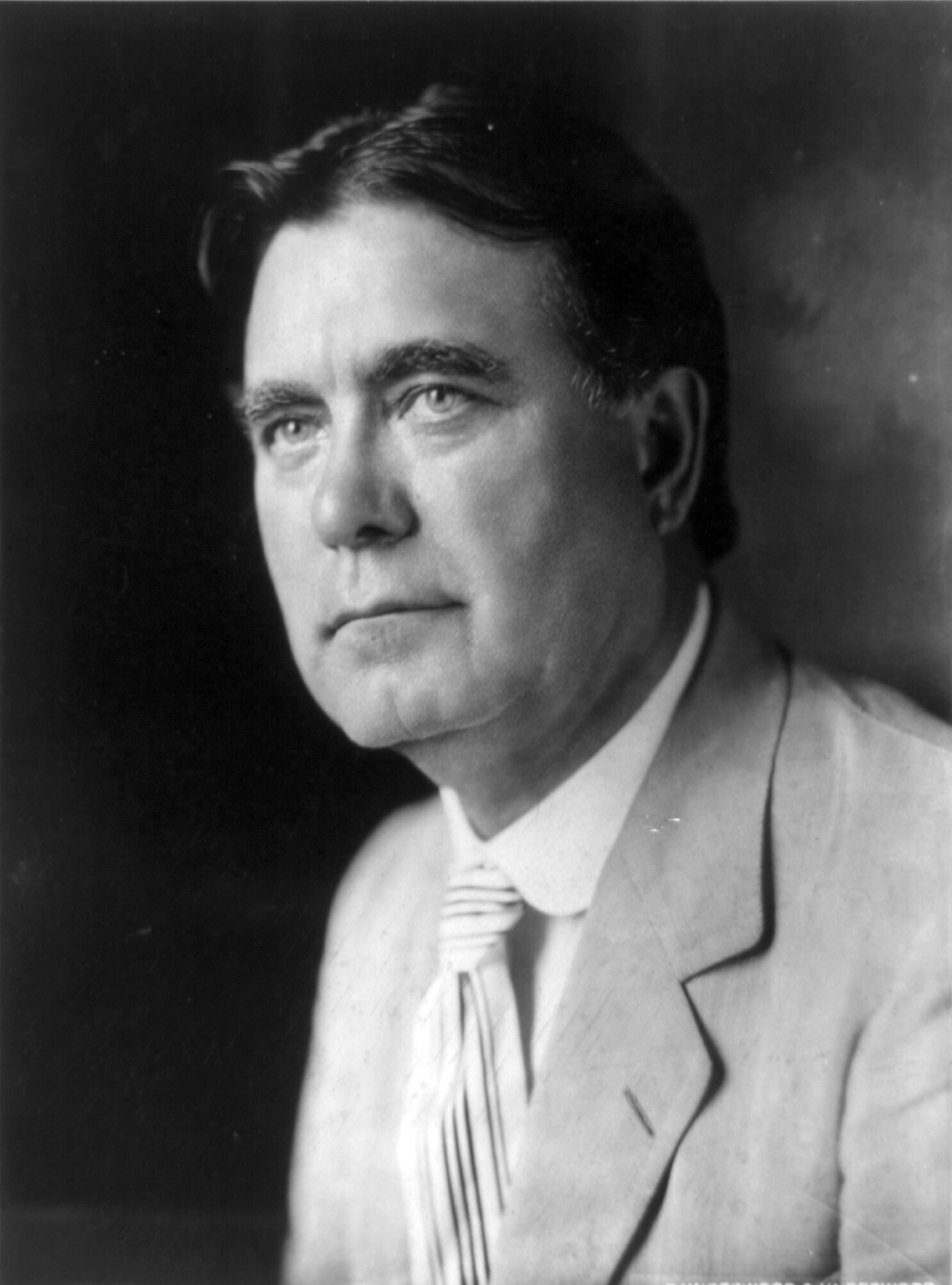
Senator
William Borah
of Idaho
(not nominated -
declined consideration)

Like Taft, Vice President James S. Sherman of New York was renominated by the party. Though Taft and Sherman did not get along early in their tenure, the two became closer allies as Taft's split with Roosevelt deepened, and Taft did not object to the re-nomination of Sherman. Taft's allies sought progressive leaders such as Idaho senator William E. Borah or Vermont governor John A. Mead to join the ticket, but both declined to be considered. Missouri governor Herbert S. Hadley and former Vice President Charles Fairbanks were also mentioned as possibilities. Sherman died shortly before the election, and was not replaced on the ticket. In January, after the election had already been decided, Republican leaders appointed Columbia University president Nicholas Butler to fill out the ticket for the purposes of receiving electoral votes.

Vice presidential ballot
Candidate	1st
Sherman	596
Borah	21
Merriam	20
Hadley	14
Beveridge	2
Gillette	1
Not voting	352
Absent	72

Vice presidential balloting / 5th day of convention (June 22, 1912)

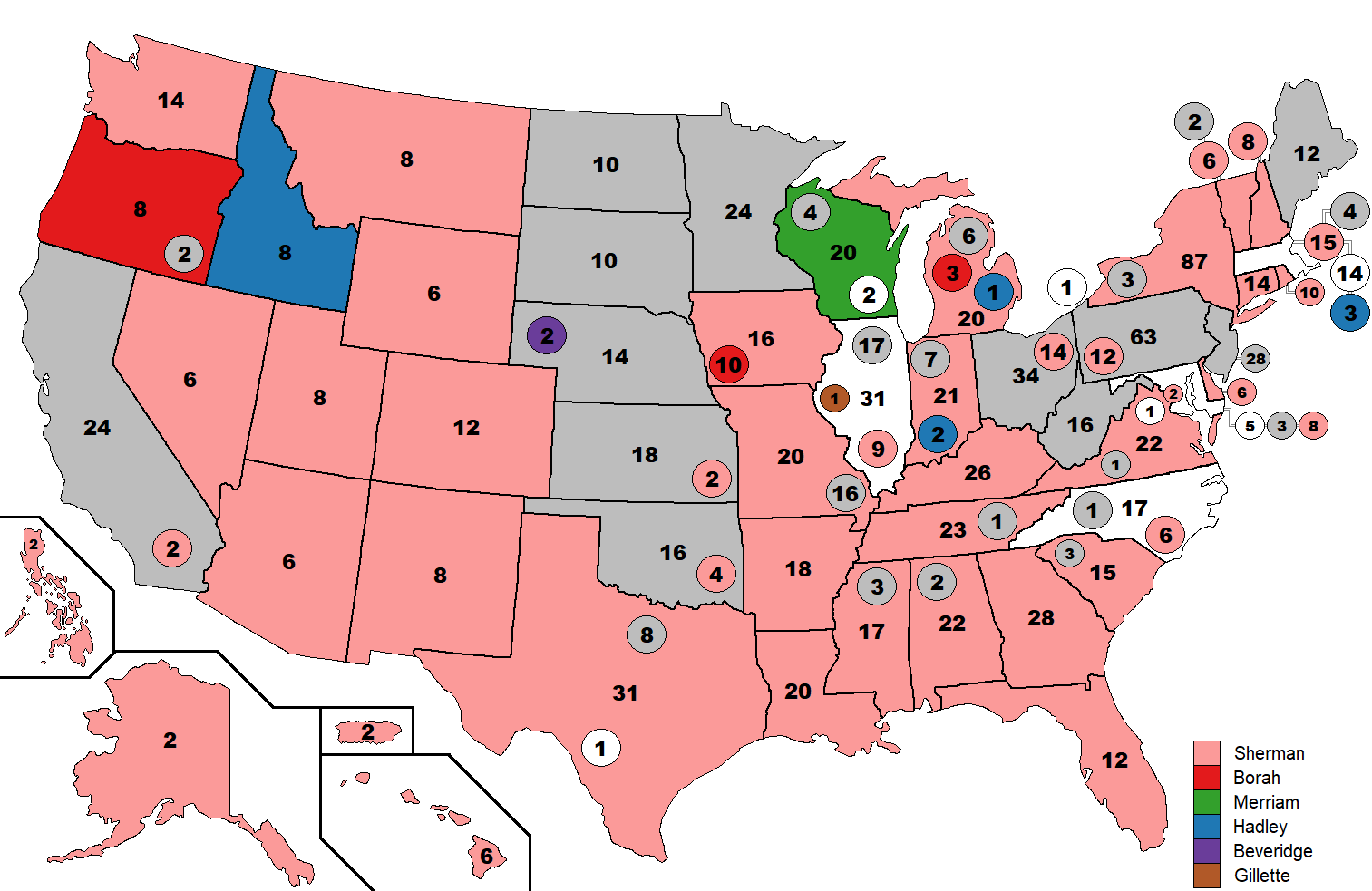
1st
vice presidential ballot

== Notable speeches ==
=== Warren G. Harding ===
At Taft's request, Senator Warren G. Harding of Ohio gave a nominating speech for the president ahead of the balloting. Harding delivered a speech peppered with fancy rhetoric, such as the declaration, "profession is not a proclamation nor palaver. It is not personal pronounces nor perennial pronouncement. Its not the perturbation of a people passionwrought, nor a promise proposed." Angry Roosevelt-supporting delegates were not receptive to Harding's oratory, and a heckler from the crowd audibly teased Harding, "Hey, senator, who are you nominating, Peter Piper?"

== See also ==
- History of the United States Republican Party
- List of Republican National Conventions
- United States presidential nominating convention
- 1912 Republican Party presidential primaries
- 1912 United States presidential election
- 1912 Democratic National Convention
- 1912 Progressive National Convention

== Works cited ==
- Sherman, Richard (1973). The Republican Party and Black America From McKinley to Hoover 1896-1933. University of Virginia Press. ISBN 0813904676.

Preceded by 1908; Chicago, Illinois	Republican National Conventions	Succeeded by 1916; Chicago, Illinois
