= Herbert S. Hadley =

American politician (1872–1927)

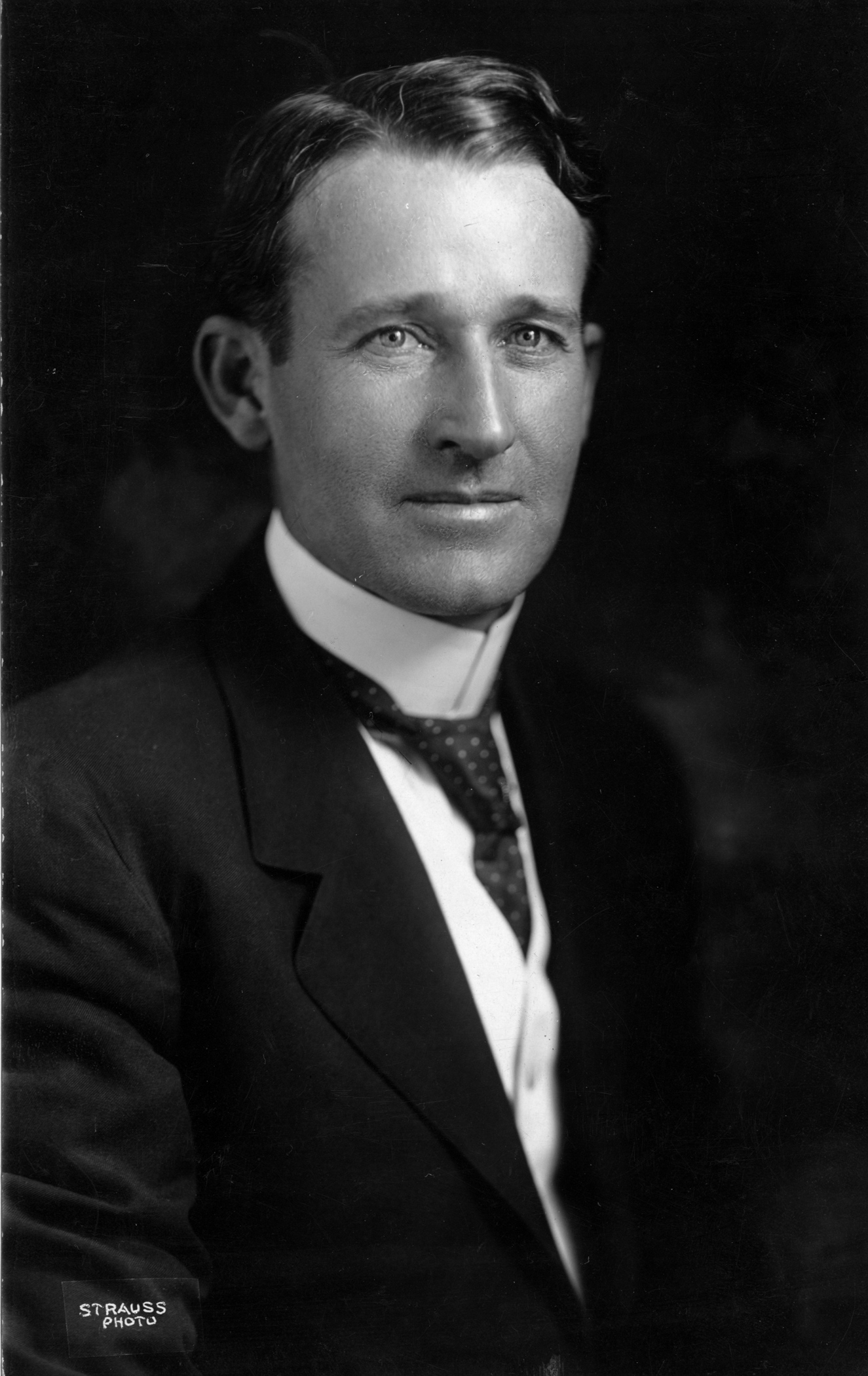
- Hadley, c. 1909

32nd Governor of Missouri
- In office January 11, 1909 – January 13, 1913
- Lieutenant: Jacob F. Gmelich
- Preceded by: Joseph W. Folk
- Succeeded by: Elliot Woolfolk Major

24th Attorney General of Missouri
- In office January 9, 1905 – January 11, 1909
- Governor: Joseph W. Folk
- Preceded by: Edward Coke Crow
- Succeeded by: Elliot Woolfolk Major

7th Chancellor of Washington University in St. Louis
- In office 1923–1927
- Preceded by: Frederic Aldin Hall
- Succeeded by: George R. Throop

Personal details
- Born: Herbert Spencer Hadley; February 20, 1872 Olathe, Kansas, U.S.
- Died: December 1, 1927 (aged 55) St. Louis, Missouri, U.S.
- Resting place: Riverview Cemetery; Jefferson City, Missouri, U.S.
- Party: Republican
- Spouse: Agnes Lee (m. 1901)
- Children: 3
- Education: University of Kansas (AB); Northwestern University School of Law

Herbert Spencer Hadley (February 20, 1872 – December 1, 1927) was an American lawyer and Republican Party politician from St. Louis, Missouri. Born in Olathe, Kansas, he was Missouri Attorney General from 1905 to 1909 and in 1908 was elected the 32nd governor of Missouri, serving one term from 1909 to 1913. As Attorney General, he successfully prosecuted Standard Oil Company for violating Missouri antitrust law. Entering the 1912 Republican convention, the Roosevelt and Taft forces seemed evenly matched, and Hadley was seen as a possible compromise candidate. While Taft was supportive of the idea, Roosevelt refused.

== Early life and family ==
Herbert Spencer Hadley was born on February 20, 1872, in Olathe, Kansas. He was the son of Major John Milton Hadley and Harriet Beach Jones Hadley. He attended the University of Kansas, where he was a member of Phi Kappa Psi fraternity and received a Bachelor of Arts in 1892. He earned his law degree from Northwestern University with first honors in 1894. While at Northwestern, he helped establish the Northwestern University Law Review. In 1891 and 1894, Hadley won first prize in Missouri's oratorical contest.

On October 8, 1901, Hadley married Agnes Lee. Their children were John Milton, Henrietta, and Herbert Spencer.

== Career ==
Hadley practiced law in Kansas City, Missouri. His first public office as Kansas City assistant city counselor began in 1898. He was the prosecuting attorney for Jackson County, Missouri from 1901 to 1903. In this position, Hadley developed a reputation for vigorous prosecution, including an investigation of jury tampering in the civil courts and a campaign against public gambling. Although he was not re-elected as prosecuting attorney, Hadley was elected as attorney general for Missouri and served in that capacity from 1905 to 1909. As attorney general, he prosecuted successful cases against Standard Oil Company, railroads, several trusts, and St. Louis racetrack gamblers.

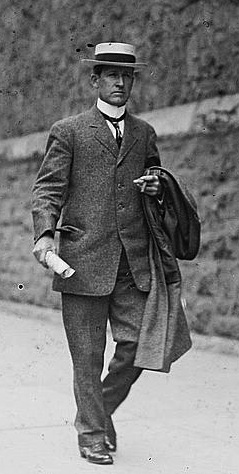
Hadley in 1912

During his term as attorney general, Hadley was the highest-ranking elected Republican official in Missouri. This, combined with Hadley's success with the Standard Oil Company suit and his record for reform, contributed to his 1908 election as governor of Missouri. His administration enacted penal reform, expanded safety and public health regulations, and established a nurse examiners' board, a fish and game commission, a game protection board, and a Missouri waterways commission. Many of Hadley's recommendations for change in other government sectors, such as revenue and public service, were not supported by the Missouri General Assembly. In 1912, Hadley served as floor leader for Theodore Roosevelt's wing of the Republican Party at the 1912 Republican National Convention. After the death of Vice President James S. Sherman in October 1912, President William Howard Taft strongly considered naming Hadley as Sherman's replacement on the 1912 Republican ticket, but Taft ultimately did not select a replacement before the election was held.

Following his gubernatorial term, Hadley resumed his law practice and worked on a federal railroad valuation project. In 1917, he moved to Colorado for health reasons and was professor of law at the University of Colorado through 1923.

== Washington University ==
Hadley became the seventh Chancellor of Washington University in St. Louis in 1923. He was recruited for the position by Robert S. Brookings who helped establish the Graduate School of Economics and Government, which became part of the Brookings Institution in 1927. During his four years as chancellor, the University also founded the George Warren Brown Department of Social Work, which later became its own school within the university and one of the top-ranked social-work programs in the United States. As a law professor, he authored Rome and the World Today (Putnam, 1922).

== Advocacy and death ==
Throughout his later years, Hadley was an advocate of legal reform and participated in reform initiatives of the American Bar Association, American Law Institute, and National Crime Commission. He was one of the authors of the Missouri Crime Survey, which recommended and successfully led to the intermediate reformatories and parole boards as part of Missouri's penal system.

Hadley was the recipient of honorary degrees from Northwestern University (1909), the University of Missouri (1910), and Harvard University (1925).

He died in 1927 of heart disease in St Louis, Missouri, and is buried at the Riverview Cemetery in Jefferson City, Missouri.

== See also ==
- Hadley portrait case in Samantha Littlefield Huntley

== Sources ==
- "Herbert Spencer Hadley. "Dictionary of American Biography Base Set. American Council of Learned Societies, 1928–1936". Reproduced in History Resource Center. Farmington Hills, MI: Gale Group.

Party political offices
Preceded by Samuel F. O'Fallon	Republican nominee for Missouri Attorney General; 1904	Succeeded by Frank B. Fulkerson
Preceded by Cyrus Walbridge	Republican nominee for Governor of Missouri; 1908	Succeeded by John C. McKinley
Legal offices
Preceded by Joseph W. Folk	Governor of Missouri; 1909–1913	Succeeded by Elliot Woolfolk Major
Preceded by Edward Coke Crow	Missouri State Attorney General; 1905–1909	Succeeded by Elliot Woolfolk Major
