= Robert F. Walker =

American judge (1850–1930)

Robert Franklin Walker
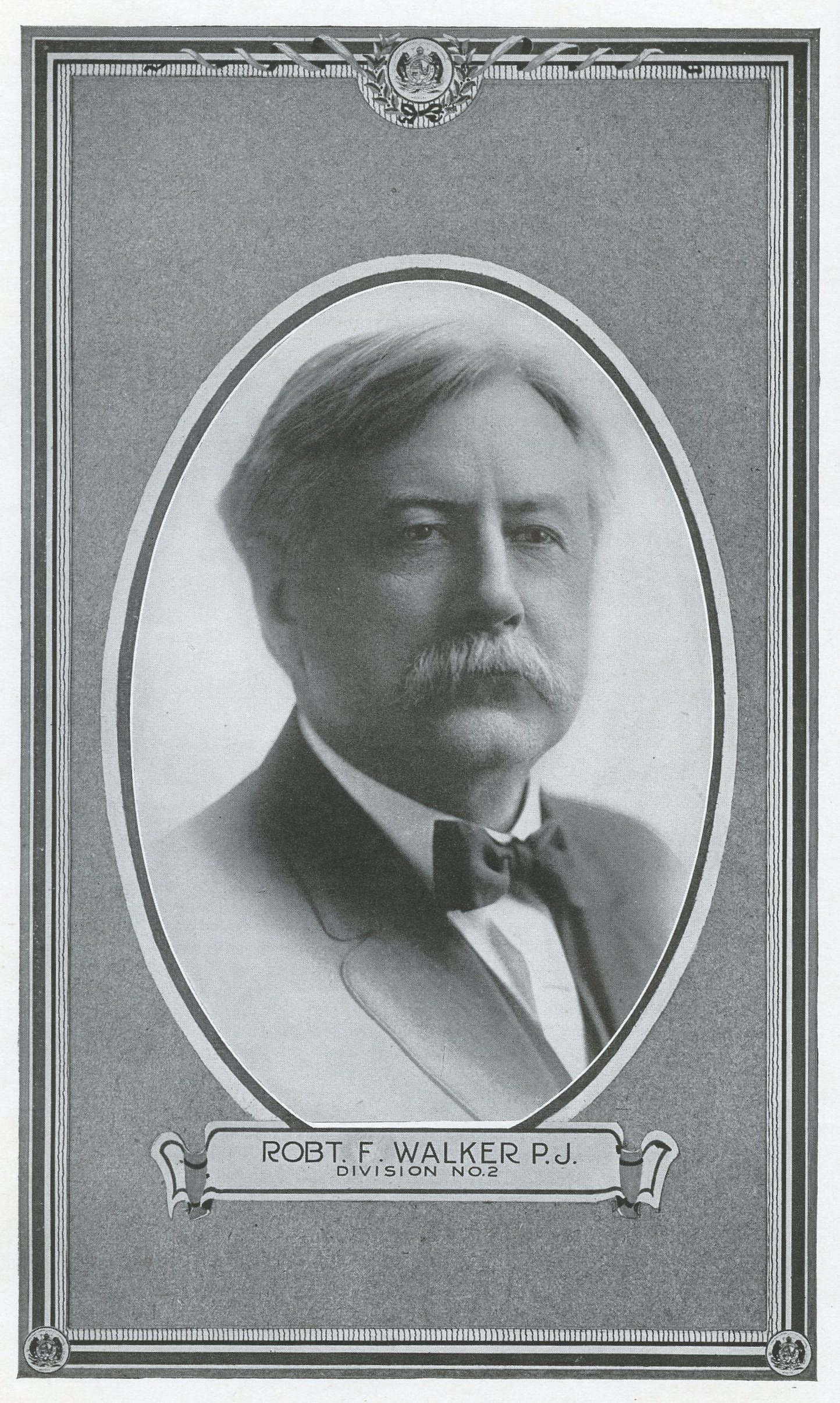
- Walker, c. 1917

Chief Justice of the Missouri Supreme Court
- In office October, 1919 – December, 1922
- In office March, 1927 – August, 1928

Judge of the Missouri Supreme Court
- In office January 1, 1913 – November 19, 1930

22nd Attorney General of Missouri
- In office 1893–1897
- Preceded by: John M. Wood
- Succeeded by: Edward C. Crow

Assistant Attorney General of Missouri
- In office 1885–1889
- Appointed by: Banton G. Boone

Prosecuting Attorney for Morgan County
- In office 1877–1885

Personal details
- Born: November 29, 1850 Florence, Missouri
- Died: November 19, 1930 Jefferson City, Missouri
- Party: Democratic
- Spouse(s): Nannie A. Wright; Geneva C. Percy
- Education: University of Missouri

Robert Franklin Walker (November 29, 1850 – November 19, 1930) was an American lawyer, jurist, and professor of law who served as Missouri Attorney General from 1893 to 1897, and as a Missouri Supreme Court justice from 1913 until his death in 1930, and twice as Chief Justice, from 1919 until 1922 and 1927 until 1928.

== Early life ==
Robert F. Walker was born in Florence, Morgan County, Missouri, in 1850 to Belford Stevenson Walker and Abigail Lewis Walker (née Evans). Walker spent the first 12 years of his life in and around Florence. In August 1862, his father, a captain, volunteered as company commander of the Forty-third Enrolled Missouri Militia, Company K. A short time later, he resigned and moved his family to Versailles, Missouri. His mother died in 1864, shortly before Walker's 14th birthday.

== Education and career ==
Walker graduated from University of Missouri in 1873 and from the University of Missouri School of Law in 1875. Walker was admitted to the Missouri State Bar in Versailles, Missouri later that same year, and commenced the practice of law.

In 1876 he was elected as the Morgan County prosecutor. Walker held that position until 1885, when he was appointed Assistant Attorney General of Missouri by Attorney General Banton G. Boone. In 1892, Walker ran for on the Democratic ticket for Missouri Attorney General and was elected with 49.5% of the vote.

Walker did not seek reelection in 1896, and moved to St. Louis where he worked as a judge and attorney. During this time he was counsel of the St. Louis Merchants' Exchange, in 1907 he was elected President of the Missouri Bar Association, and he traveled and spoke at different events and universities. One such event was an address to the Current Topics Club in St. Louis, at which Walker criticized then president Theodore Roosevelt, for inviting Booker T. Washington to the White House. Walker commented, "Teach the negro honesty and industry, but do not try to take a companion of him, or lead him to think that he is worthy of a white man's table or a white man's bed." He also claimed, "[The President was] an enemy to individual liberty and a disgrace to his own race." The same year, Walker spoke at the Old Settler's Association of Morgan County, his address was transcribed and filed in the Library of Congress.

== Supreme Court ==
In 1912 Walker received the Democratic nomination for a seat on the Missouri Supreme Court. He was elected to a ten-year term, and was elected to a second term in 1922. As a justice, Walker was "known on the bench for his liberal views and frequent opinions dissenting from the majority".

== Personal life, illness and death ==
Walker was married twice, first on September 20, 1877, to Nannie A. Wright, until her death in 1892, and then on September 28, 1896, to Geneva C. Percy until her death in 1929.

At the time Walker died, newspapers reported he had been in poor health the previous two years and had undergone a major operation the year before and was hospitalized the last ten days of his life. His death certificate states the cause of death was due to Interstitial nephritis, an inflammation of the area of the kidney, an issue he had dealt with for about six months.

Political offices
Preceded by John Kennish	Justice of the Missouri Supreme Court; 1913–1930	Succeeded by Berryman Henwood
