= Elliott Woolfolk Major =

American politician (1864–1949)

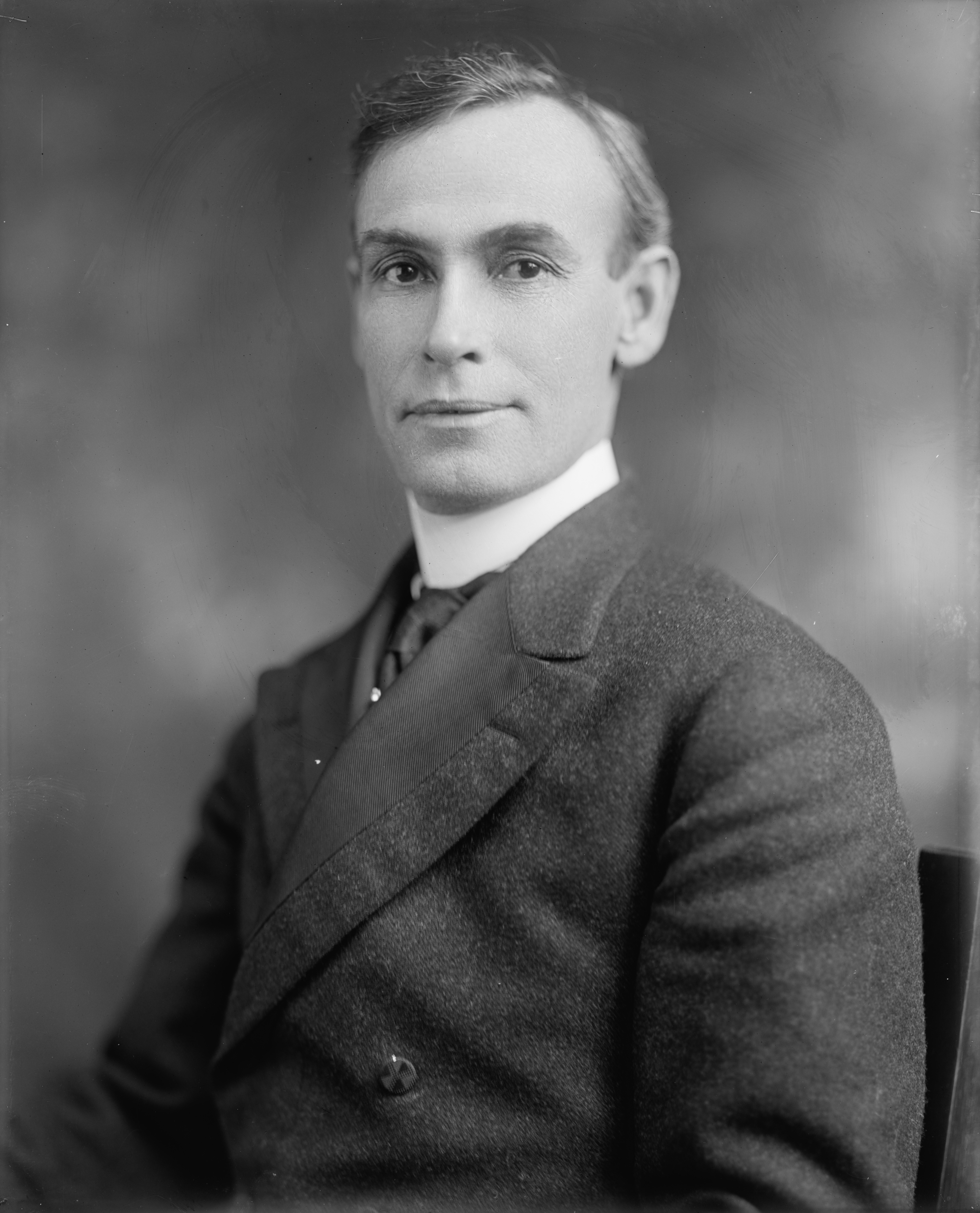

33rd Governor of Missouri
- In office January 13, 1913 – January 8, 1917
- Lieutenant: William Rock Painter
- Preceded by: Herbert S. Hadley
- Succeeded by: Frederick D. Gardner

25th Attorney General of Missouri
- In office 1909–1913
- Preceded by: Herbert S. Hadley
- Succeeded by: John T. Barker

Member of the Missouri Senate
- In office 1897–1901

Personal details
- Born: October 20, 1864 Lincoln County, Missouri
- Died: July 9, 1949 (aged 84) Eureka, Missouri

Elliott Woolfolk Major (October 20, 1864 – July 9, 1949) was an American lawyer and progressive Democratic politician from Pike County, Missouri, who served as the 25th attorney general of Missouri and the 33rd governor of Missouri.

== Biography ==
Born in 1864 in Lincoln County, Missouri, Elliott Major attended Lincoln County public schools. He then went to Watson Seminary in Pike County. After studying law, he was admitted to the bar in 1885. Major's political rise began with a seat in the Missouri Senate, which he held between 1897 and 1901. Between 1909 and 1913 he was Attorney General of Missouri. In November 1912 he was elected the new governor of his state.

Major took up his new post on January 13, 1913. Several new agencies emerged in Missouri during his four-year tenure. These included the Highway Commission, a pardon committee, assistance to the blind, and a public services committee. In addition, the state flag of Missouri was officially presented and introduced at that time, and various labor laws were introduced, together with other reforms such as a law aimed at providing free school textbooks.

After his tenure ended in January 1917, Major retired from politics and returned to practice as a lawyer. His office was in St. Louis. He was married to Elizabeth Myers, with whom he had three children. He died on July 9, 1949, in Eureka, Missouri, and was buried in the Bowling Green City Cemetery at Bowling Green, Missouri.

Party political offices
Preceded by Edward Coke Crow	Democratic nominee for Missouri Attorney General; 1904, 1908	Succeeded by John Tull Barker
Preceded by William S. Cowherd	Democratic nominee for Governor of Missouri; 1912	Succeeded by Frederick D. Gardner
Legal offices
Preceded by Herbert S. Hadley	Missouri State Attorney General; 1909–1913	Succeeded by John Tull Barker
Political offices
Preceded by Herbert S. Hadley	Governor of Missouri; 1913–1917	Succeeded by Frederick D. Gardner
