= Edward Coke Crow =

American lawyer (1861–1945)

Attorney General of Missouri
- In office 1897–1905
- Governor: Lawrence Vest Stephens; Alexander M. Dockery
- Preceded by: Robert Franklin Walker
- Succeeded by: Herbert S. Hadley

Personal details
- Education: Washington University in St. Louis

Edward Coke Crow (December 19, 1861 – May 9, 1945) was a United States Democratic Attorney General from the state of Missouri.

== Life ==
He was born in Oregon, Holt County, Missouri, United States on 19 Dec 1861 and was the sixth of seven children born to Elizabeth Hopkins Barnes and George Washington Crow.

Crow attended Washington University in St. Louis, Missouri and served as an attorney for Anheuser-Busch before serving as the 23rd Attorney General of Missouri from 1897 to 1905. He represented Jasper County, Missouri. Crow was also a friend and advisor to Missouri Governor Lloyd C. Stark, who served from 1937 to 1941.

He was a member of the Carthage Light Guard in Carthage, Missouri. It was a very highly esteemed group and was the pride of Carthage, Jasper County, Missouri. It later became the 2nd Missouri Militia. A photo of the Light Guard was published in 1881 in the Carthage Press.

Edward was married first to Mary Eichelberger, c. 1879. This marriage was later annulled. Crow later married Gustavia "Gussie" Hanna on 14 September 1890 at Marshall, Missouri. They had ten children.

Edward Coke Crow died in Los Alamitos, California.

Party political offices
Preceded by Robert Franklin Walker	Democratic nominee for Missouri Attorney General; 1896, 1900	Succeeded by Elliot Woolfolk Major
Legal offices
Preceded by Robert F. Walker	Missouri State Attorney General; 1897–1905	Succeeded by Herbert S. Hadley
