= 1908 Missouri gubernatorial election =

- November 3, 1908
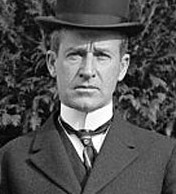

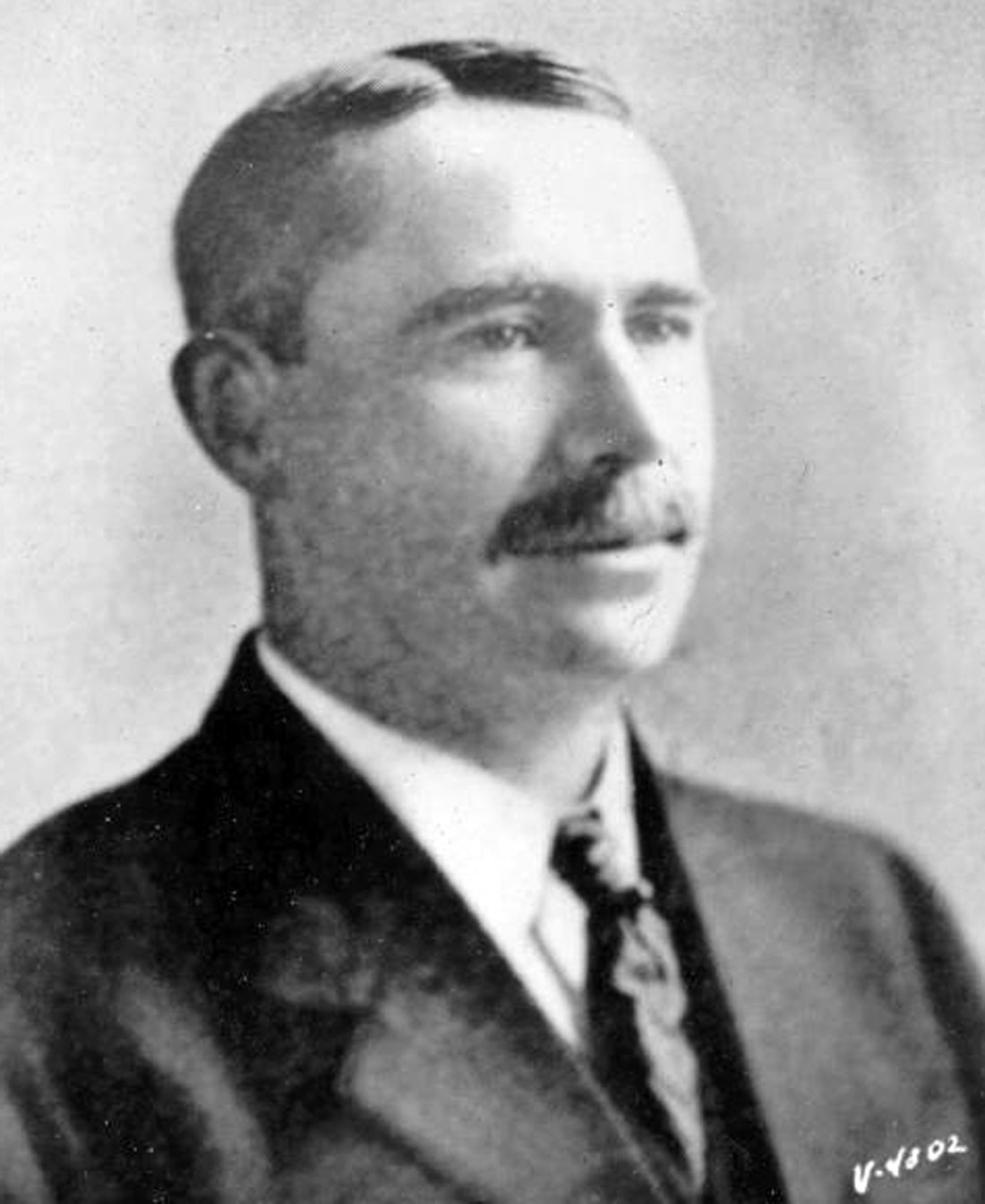
Nominee	Herbert S. Hadley	William S. Cowherd
Party	Republican	Democratic
Popular vote	355,932	340,053
Percentage	49.73%	47.51%
- County results Hadley: 40–50% 50–60% 60–70% 70–80% 80–90% Cowherd: 40–50% 50–60% 60–70% 70–80%
Governor before election
Joseph W. Folk
Democratic
Elected Governor
Herbert S. Hadley
Republican

The 1908 Missouri gubernatorial election was held on November 3, 1908, and resulted in a victory for the Republican nominee, Missouri Attorney General Herbert S. Hadley, over the Democratic candidate, former Congressman William S. Cowherd, and several other candidates representing minor parties.

This election broke a string of eleven consecutive Democratic governors, as it was the first election since 1870 which did not result in a victory by the Democratic nominee (no Democrat had run in 1870).

== Results ==
1908 gubernatorial election, Missouri
Party	Candidate	Votes	%	±%
Republican	Herbert S. Hadley	355,932	49.73	+3.68
Democratic	William S. Cowherd	340,053	47.51	−3.22
Socialist	William Lincoln Garver	14,505	2.03	+0.32
Prohibition	Herman Preston Faris	4,169	0.58	−0.29
Populist	William A. Dillon	1,058	0.15	−0.27
Majority		15,879	2.22	−2.45
Turnout		715,720	23.04	
Republican gain from Democratic		Swing		
