= Banton G. Boone =

American politician and lawyer

Banton Gallitin Boone
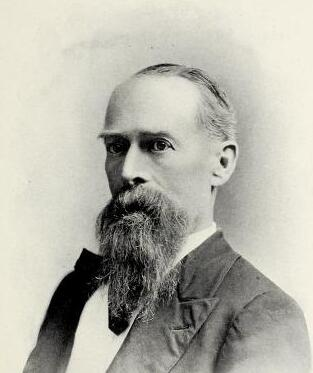

Speaker of the Missouri House of Representatives
- In office 1875–1877
- Preceded by: Mortimer McIlhaney
- Succeeded by: John F. Williams

Attorney General of Missouri
- In office 1885–1889
- Preceded by: Daniel McIntyre
- Succeeded by: John M. Wood

Personal details
- Born: October 23, 1838
- Died: February 11, 1900 (aged 61)
- Party: Democratic

Banton Gallitin Boone (October 23, 1838 – February 11, 1900) was a Democratic Party politician and lawyer from Missouri. He served as Speaker of the Missouri House of Representatives from 1875 to 1877, and Missouri Attorney General from 1885 to 1889.

Boone was a descendant of the famous American pioneer and frontiersman Daniel Boone. He was born in Callaway County and moved to Clinton in Henry County, where he became Deputy County Clerk in 1856. He was admitted to the bar in 1860. He fought for the Confederacy in the Civil War.
