= Henley (name) =

Henley is an English surname. Notable people with the surname include:

- Adam Henley (born 1994), Welsh professional football (soccer) player
- Althea Henley (1911–1996), American actress
- Sir Andrew Henley, 1st Baronet (1622–75), English politician
- Anthony Henley (1667–1711), English Whig politician and MP
- Anthony Henley (cricketer) (1846–1916), English cricketer
- Anthony Henley (died 1748) (1704–1748), British politician and MP
- Anthony Henley, 3rd Baron Henley (1825–1898), British peer and Liberal Member of Parliament
- Artie Henley (1878–1941), Australian rules footballer
- Ashley Henley (1981–2021), American politician
- Barclay Henley (1843–1914), U.S. Representative
- Barry Shabaka Henley (born 1954), American character actor
- Ben C. Henley (1907–1987), Arkansas Republican politician
- Beth Henley (born 1952), Pulitzer Prize-winning playwright
- Bob Henley (born 1973), American baseball player
- Cack Henley (1884–1929), American baseball player
- Carey Henley (1936–2013), marine, professional football player, and coach
- Charley Henley (1973), visual effects artist, son of Drewe
- Daiyan Henley (born 1999), American football player
- Darryl Henley (born 1966), former NFL football player
- Darryl Henley (born 1966), former American football cornerback in the National Football League
- David Henley (1749–1823), Continental Army officer during the American Revolutionary War
- David Henley (producer) (1894–1986), British film producer
- Desmond Henley (1927–2005), British embalmer
- D. L. George Henley (1917–1996), Canadian politician
- Dolly Henley, American politician
- Don Henley (born 1947), American rock musician, member of The Eagles
- Drewe Henley (1940–2016), British actor
- Elmer Wayne Henley (born 1956), American serial killer
- Ernest Henley (athlete) (1889–1962), British athlete
- Ernest M. Henley (1924–2017), American atomic and nuclear physicist
- Frances Henley (1896–1955), American architect
- Francis Henley (1884–1963), English first-class cricketer active 1903–08
- Fred L. Henley (1911–1994), Missouri Supreme Court judge
- Gail Henley (1928–2024), retired American pro baseball player
- Garney Henley (born 1935), Canadian Football League player
- George Henley (judge) (1890–1965), Justice of the Indiana Supreme Court for two months (March 15 to May 23, 1955)
- Georgie Henley (born 1995), English actress
- Henry Henley (1612–1696), British politician
- Henry Holt Henley (died 1748), British lawyer and politician
- Herbert Henley (1889–1966), Australian politician
- Hobart Henley (1887–1964), American film actor/director
- J. W. Henley (1793–1884), British politician
- Jack Henley (1896–1958), American screenwriter
- Jacques Henley (active 1930–1947), French actor
- Jaden Henley (born 2004), American basketball player
- Jean Emily Henley (1910−1994), American anesthesiologist
- Jeffrey O. Henley (born 1945), Vice Chairman of Oracle Corporation
- Jesse Smith Henley (1917–1997), federal judge in Arkansas
- Joan Henley (1904–1986), Irish actress and radio presenter
- John Henley (1692–1759), English clergyman, known as Orator Henley
- John D. Henley (1781–1835), US naval officer
- John T. Henley (1921–2012), North Carolina politician
- Joseph Warner Henley (1793–1884), British conservative politician in the protectionist governments of Lord Derby
- Judith Henley (active 1975–2011 at the least), Australian opera singer
- June Henley (born 1975), former NFL American football player
- Larry Henley (1937–2014), American singer/songwriter
- Les Henley (1922–1996), British football (soccer) player/manager
- Margaret Henley (1888–1894), only child of a British poet; served as inspiration for several literary characters
- Melvin Henley (born 1935), American politician
- Micajah C. Henley (1856–1927), U.S. industrialist and inventor, "Roller Skate King"
- Michael Henley (1939–2014), British bishop
- Michael Henley (died 1988), American formerly missing person
- Patrick Henley (1959–2021), aka Henriette Valium, comic book artist and painter in Quebec
- Paul Henley (British journalist)
- Peter Henley (presenter) (born 1964), TV reporter
- Robert Henley (Birmingham mayor), 1st Mayor of Birmingham, Alabama (1871 to 1872)
- Robert Henley (cricketer) (1851–1889), English cricketer
- Robert Henley (naval officer) (1783–1828), US naval officer, brother of John D. Henley
- Robert Henley, 1st Earl of Northington (c. 1708 – 1772), Lord Chancellor, Whig member of parliament, writer and wit
- Robert Henley, 2nd Baron Henley (1789–1841), British lawyer and politician
- Robert Henley, 2nd Earl of Northington (1747–1786), British politician
- Ron Henley (born 1956), American chess grandmaster
- Ron Henley (rapper) (born 1986), Filipino rapper and songwriter
- Rosina Henley (1890–1978), American actress and screenwriter
- Russell Henley (born 1989), American pro golfer on PGA Tour
- Samuel Henley (1740–1815), British clergyman and teacher
- Samuel Henley (ice hockey) (born 1993), Canadian former professional ice hockey forward
- Sarah Ann Henley (1862–1948), British barmaid famous for surviving a 75-meter / 245 foot jump
- Simon Henley FRAeS (born 1957), former Royal Navy officer, President of the Royal Aeronautical Society
- Stormi Henley (born 1990), Miss Teen USA 2009
- Terry Henley, American football player
- Tess Henley (born 1987), American singer-songwriter and pianist
- Thomas Henley (Australian politician)
- Thomas Henley (pirate) (1683–1685), pirate and privateer active in the Red Sea and the Caribbean
- Thomas J. Henley (1808–1875), U.S. Representative from Indiana
- Vic Henley (1962–2020), American comedian
- Virginia Henley (born 1935) British romance-novel writer
- Walter of Henley, agricultural writer of the thirteenth century
- Weldon Henley (1880–1960), U.S. major league baseball pitcher
- William Henley (disambiguation), multiple people

== See also ==
- Henley (disambiguation)
- Hanley (disambiguation)
- Hendley
- Henle (disambiguation)
- Henleys
- Hennelly
- Hensley (disambiguation)
- Honley
- Hunley
