= Henley =

Henley may refer to:

== Places ==
=== United Kingdom ===
- Henley, Dorset, England
- Henley, Gloucestershire, a location
- Henley-on-Thames, a town in South Oxfordshire, England
  - Henley (constituency), a UK Parliament constituency
  - Henley Rural District, a former rural district in Oxfordshire
- Henley, Acton Scott, a location in Shropshire
- Henley, Bitterley, a location in Shropshire
- Henley, Suffolk, a village in Suffolk, England
- Henley, High Ham, a location in Somerset, England
- Henley, West Crewkerne, a hamlet south of Crewkerne, England
- Henley Fort, Victorian fort near Guildford, Surrey
- Henley-in-Arden, a small town in Warwickshire, England
- Henley, West Sussex, a location in Easebourne
- Henley Common, an area near Fernhurst, West Sussex
- Henley, Box, Wiltshire
- Henley, Buttermere, Wiltshire

=== United States ===
- Henley, Missouri, an unincorporated community in southwestern Cole County
- Henley, Ohio, an unincorporated community
- Henley, Oregon, unincorporated community in Klamath County, Oregon, United States
- Henley Cay, tropical islet in the United States Virgin Islands

=== Elsewhere ===
- Henley, New South Wales, a suburb of Sydney, Australia
- Henley, New Zealand, a town in the South Island of New Zealand
- Henley River, river in Kenora District in Northwestern Ontario, Canada
- Henley Beach, South Australia, a coastal suburb of Adelaide
- Henley Beach South, a coastal suburb of Adelaide

== Education ==
- Henley Business School, UK
  - Henley Business School, South Africa, one of its several affiliates
- Henley College (disambiguation)
- Henley High School (disambiguation)

== People ==
- Henley (name), a list of people with the surname
- Baron Henley, titles in the Peerage of Great Britain and in the Peerage of Ireland
- Daiyan Henley (born 1999), American football player
- Don Henley (born 1947), American musician and singer/drummer for the rock band Eagles
- William Ernest Henley, the late Victorian poet, editor, and critic
- Justice Henley (disambiguation), several people

== Sport ==
=== Rowing ===
- Henley Boat Races, for crews not in the main Oxford-Cambridge Boat Race
- Henley Royal Regatta, annual rowing event on the river Thames
- Henley Women's Regatta
- Royal Canadian Henley Regatta, annual rowing event held in St. Catharines, Ontario, Canada
- American Henley Regatta, a regatta held in the nineteenth century as the U.S. national championships

=== Other ===
- Henley Hawks, a rugby union club based in Henley-on-Thames, England

== Military ==
- Hawker Henley, aircraft used by the RAF in World War II
- USS Henley, four American warships

== Other uses ==
- Henley & Partners, global citizenship and residence advisory firm based in London
- Henley shirt, a collarless casual shirt
- Henley Forklift

== See also ==
- Henlea, a genus of annelids
- Hanley (disambiguation)
- Hendley
- Henle (disambiguation)
- Henleys
- Hennelly
- Hensley (disambiguation)
- Honley
- Hunley
