= List of United Kingdom locations: Hen-Hh =

The United Kingdom

This is part of the list of United Kingdom locations: a gazetteer of place names in the United Kingdom showing each place's locality and geographical coordinates.

== Hen ==
Location	Locality	Coordinates (links to map & photo sources)	OS grid reference
Henaford	Devon	50.93°N 04.50°W	SS2418
Hen Bentref Llandegfan	Isle of Anglesey	53.24°N 04.15°W	SH5674
Henbrook	Worcestershire	52.29°N 02.11°W	SO9266
Henbury	Dorset	50.78°N 02.07°W	SY9598
Henbury	City of Bristol	51.49°N 02.63°W	ST5678
Henbury	Cheshire	53.25°N 02.18°W	SJ8873
Hendomen	Powys	52.57°N 03.16°W	SO2198
Hendon	Barnet	51.58°N 00.22°W	TQ2389
Hendon	Sunderland	54.88°N 01.37°W	NZ4055
Hendra (Breage)	Cornwall	50.09°N 05.37°W	SW5927
Hendra (Camelford)	Cornwall	50.61°N 04.70°W	SX0983
Hendra (Grade-Ruan)	Cornwall	50.00°N 05.21°W	SW7017
Hendra (St Dennis)	Cornwall	50.37°N 04.88°W	SW9557
Hendra (Stithians)	Cornwall	50.18°N 05.19°W	SW7237
Hendra (Wendron)	Cornwall	50.13°N 05.23°W	SW6931
Hendra (Withiel)	Cornwall	50.44°N 04.84°W	SW9864
Hendrabridge	Cornwall	50.45°N 04.45°W	SX2665
Hendraburnick	Cornwall	50.65°N 04.66°W	SX1287
Hendra Croft	Cornwall	50.35°N 05.10°W	SW7955
Hendre	Flintshire	53.19°N 03.21°W	SJ1967
Hendre	Powys	52.57°N 03.52°W	SN9799
Hendre	Gwynedd	52.66°N 04.08°W	SH5909
Hendre-ddu	Conwy	53.17°N 03.69°W	SH8766
Hendredenny Park	Caerphilly	51.57°N 03.25°W	ST1387
Hendreforgan	Rhondda, Cynon, Taff	51.58°N 03.47°W	SS9888
Hendrerwydd	Denbighshire	53.15°N 03.31°W	SJ1263
Hendrewen	Swansea	51.74°N 04.01°W	SN6107
Hendy	Carmarthenshire	51.70°N 04.05°W	SN5803
Hen-efail	Denbighshire	53.15°N 03.40°W	SJ0663
Heneglwys	Isle of Anglesey	53.25°N 04.37°W	SH4276
Henfield	West Sussex	50.93°N 00.27°W	TQ2116
Henfield	South Gloucestershire	51.50°N 02.47°W	ST6779
Henford	Devon	50.72°N 04.32°W	SX3694
Henfords Marsh	Wiltshire	51.18°N 02.18°W	ST8743
Hengistbury Head	Dorset	50.71°N 01.74°W	SZ183909
Hengoed	Powys	52.17°N 03.14°W	SO2253
Hengoed	Caerphilly	51.64°N 03.24°W	ST1495
Hengoed	Denbighshire	53.11°N 03.37°W	SJ0858
Hengoed	Shropshire	52.88°N 03.07°W	SJ2833
Hengrave	Suffolk	52.28°N 00.66°E	TL8268
Hengrave	Norfolk	52.72°N 01.15°E	TG1319
Hengrove	City of Bristol	51.40°N 02.57°W	ST6068
Hengrove Park	City of Bristol	51.40°N 02.59°W	ST5968
Henham	Essex	51.92°N 00.23°E	TL5428
Heniarth	Powys	52.66°N 03.30°W	SJ1208
Henlade	Somerset	51.00°N 03.05°W	ST2623
Henleaze	City of Bristol	51.48°N 02.60°W	ST5876
Henley	Dorset	50.83°N 02.44°W	ST6904
Henley	Gloucestershire	51.84°N 02.14°W	SO9016
Henley (Acton Scott)	Shropshire	52.48°N 02.81°W	SO4588
Henley (near Ludlow)	Shropshire	52.38°N 02.67°W	SO5476
Henley	Somerset	51.08°N 02.81°W	ST4332
Henley	Suffolk	52.11°N 01.13°E	TM1551
Henley	West Sussex	51.01°N 00.73°W	SU8925
Henley (near Box)	Wiltshire	51.40°N 02.26°W	ST8267
Henley (near Buttermere)	Wiltshire	51.32°N 01.54°W	SU3259
Henley Common	West Sussex	51.02°N 00.74°W	SU8826
Henley Green	Coventry	52.42°N 01.47°W	SP3681
Henley-in-Arden	Warwickshire	52.28°N 01.78°W	SP1565
Henley-on-Thames	Oxfordshire	51.53°N 00.90°W	SU7682
Henley's Down	East Sussex	50.88°N 00.45°E	TQ7312
Henley Street	Kent	51.37°N 00.38°E	TQ6667
Henllan	Carmarthenshire	52.03°N 04.40°W	SN3540
Henllan	Denbighshire	53.20°N 03.46°W	SJ0268
Henllan Amgoed	Carmarthenshire	51.84°N 04.64°W	SN1819
Henlle	Shropshire	52.89°N 03.01°W	SJ3233
Henllys	Torfaen	51.63°N 03.07°W	ST2693
Henllys Vale	Torfaen	51.62°N 03.05°W	ST2792
Henlow	Bedfordshire	52.02°N 00.29°W	TL1738
Hennock	Devon	50.61°N 03.65°W	SX8381
Henny Street	Essex	52.00°N 00.72°E	TL8738
Henryd	Conwy	53.24°N 03.84°W	SH7774
Henry's Moat	Pembrokeshire	51.90°N 04.85°W	SN0427
Hensall	North Yorkshire	53.70°N 01.10°W	SE5923
Henshaw	Northumberland	54.97°N 02.37°W	NY7664
Henshaw	Leeds	53.85°N 01.69°W	SE2040
Hensingham	Cumbria	54.52°N 03.57°W	NX9816
Hensington	Oxfordshire	51.84°N 01.34°W	SP4516
Henstead	Suffolk	52.40°N 01.65°E	TM4985
Hensting	Hampshire	50.98°N 01.30°W	SU4921
Henstridge	Devon	51.17°N 04.03°W	SS5844
Henstridge	Somerset	50.96°N 02.40°W	ST7219
Henstridge Ash	Somerset	50.97°N 02.40°W	ST7220
Henstridge Bowden	Somerset	50.97°N 02.44°W	ST6920
Henstridge Marsh	Somerset	50.97°N 02.37°W	ST7420
Henton	Somerset	51.20°N 02.73°W	ST4945
Henton	Oxfordshire	51.71°N 00.90°W	SP7602
Henwood	Cornwall	50.53°N 04.45°W	SX2673
Henwood	Oxfordshire	51.71°N 01.33°W	SP4602
Henwood Green	Kent	51.13°N 00.32°E	TQ6340

== Heo-Hey ==
Location	Locality	Coordinates (links to map & photo sources)	OS grid reference
Heogan	Shetland Islands	60.16°N 01.15°W	HU4743
Heoga Ness	Shetland Islands	60.49°N 01.04°W	HU525792
Heol-ddu	Carmarthenshire	51.70°N 04.23°W	SN4603
Heol-ddu	Swansea	51.66°N 03.96°W	SS6498
Heolgerrig	Merthyr Tydfil	51.74°N 03.40°W	SO0306
Heol-laethog	Bridgend	51.54°N 03.54°W	SS9384
Heol Las	Swansea	51.66°N 03.89°W	SS6998
Heol-las	Bridgend	51.52°N 03.54°W	SS9382
Heol Senni	Powys	51.89°N 03.57°W	SN9223
Heol-y-Cyw	Bridgend	51.54°N 03.53°W	SS9484
Heol-y-gaer	Powys	52.04°N 03.18°W	SO1939
Heol-y-mynydd	The Vale Of Glamorgan	51.45°N 03.61°W	SS8874
Hepburn	Northumberland	55.51°N 01.90°W	NU0624
Hepple	Northumberland	55.29°N 02.03°W	NT9800
Hepscott	Northumberland	55.15°N 01.65°W	NZ2284
Hepthorne Lane	Derbyshire	53.17°N 01.40°W	SK4064
Heptonstall	Calderdale	53.74°N 02.04°W	SD9728
Hepworth	Suffolk	52.32°N 00.90°E	TL9874
Hepworth	Kirklees	53.55°N 01.75°W	SE1606
Herbrandston	Pembrokeshire	51.72°N 05.10°W	SM8607
Hereford	Herefordshire	52.05°N 02.71°W	SO5140
Heribost	Highland	57.41°N 06.54°W	NG2745
Heribusta	Highland	57.64°N 06.35°W	NG4070
Heriot	Scottish Borders	55.76°N 02.95°W	NT4053
Herma Ness	Shetland Islands	60.84°N 00.89°W	HP602182
Hermetray	Western Isles	57.65°N 07.05°W	NF987738
Hermiston	City of Edinburgh	55.91°N 03.32°W	NT1770
Hermitage	Dorset	50.86°N 02.51°W	ST6407
Hermitage	West Sussex	50.83°N 00.93°W	SU7505
Hermitage	Berkshire	51.45°N 01.26°W	SU5173
Hermitage	Scottish Borders	55.24°N 02.78°W	NY5095
Hermitage Green	Cheshire	53.44°N 02.60°W	SJ6094
Hermit Hill	Barnsley	53.49°N 01.51°W	SE3200
Hermit Hole	Bradford	53.84°N 01.92°W	SE0539
Hermon	Carmarthenshire	51.94°N 04.38°W	SN3630
Hermon	Pembrokeshire	51.94°N 04.62°W	SN2031
Hermon	Isle of Anglesey	53.18°N 04.42°W	SH3868
Herne	Kent	51.35°N 01.12°E	TR1866
Herne Bay	Kent	51.36°N 01.11°E	TR1767
Herne Common	Kent	51.34°N 01.11°E	TR1765
Herne Hill	Lambeth	51.44°N 00.10°W	TQ3274
Herne Pound	Kent	51.26°N 00.36°E	TQ6554
Hernhill	Kent	51.30°N 00.95°E	TR0660
Herniss	Cornwall	50.16°N 05.18°W	SW7334
Herodsfoot	Cornwall	50.41°N 04.52°W	SX2160
Heron Cross	City of Stoke-on-Trent	52.98°N 02.16°W	SJ8943
Heronden	Kent	51.23°N 01.27°E	TR2954
Herongate	Essex	51.59°N 00.33°E	TQ6291
Heronsford	South Ayrshire	55.10°N 04.96°W	NX1183
Heronsgate	Hertfordshire	51.63°N 00.52°W	TQ0294
Heron's Ghyll	East Sussex	51.02257°N 0.11094°E	TQ4826
Herons Green	Bath and North East Somerset	51.32°N 02.64°W	ST5559
Heronston	Bridgend	51.49°N 03.57°W	SS9178
Herra	Shetland Islands	60.59°N 00.90°W	HU6091
Herriard	Hampshire	51.20°N 01.05°W	SU6645
Herringfleet	Suffolk	52.51°N 01.65°E	TM4897
Herring's Green	Bedfordshire	52.08°N 00.42°W	TL0844
Herringswell	Suffolk	52.29°N 00.50°E	TL7169
Herringthorpe	Rotherham	53.42°N 01.33°W	SK4492
Hersden	Kent	51.31°N 01.15°E	TR2062
Hersham	Cornwall	50.83°N 04.48°W	SS2507
Hersham	Surrey	51.36°N 00.40°W	TQ1164
Herstmonceux	East Sussex	50.88°N 00.31°E	TQ6312
Herston	Dorset	50.60°N 01.98°W	SZ0178
Hertford	Hertfordshire	51.79°N 00.08°W	TL3212
Hertford Heath	Hertfordshire	51.78°N 00.04°W	TL3511
Hertingfordbury	Hertfordshire	51.79°N 00.11°W	TL3012
Hesketh Bank	Lancashire	53.70°N 02.86°W	SD4323
Hesketh Lane	Lancashire	53.86°N 02.59°W	SD6141
Hesketh Moss	Lancashire	53.69°N 02.86°W	SD4322
Hesket Newmarket	Cumbria	54.73°N 03.04°W	NY3338
Heskin Green	Lancashire	53.62°N 02.71°W	SD5315
Hesleden	Durham	54.73°N 01.31°W	NZ4438
Heslington	York	53.94°N 01.05°W	SE6250
Hessay	York	53.97°N 01.20°W	SE5253
Hessenford	Cornwall	50.38°N 04.39°W	SX3057
Hessett	Suffolk	52.21°N 00.82°E	TL9361
Hessle	East Riding of Yorkshire	53.72°N 00.44°W	TA0326
Hessle	Wakefield	53.64°N 01.35°W	SE4317
Hestaford	Shetland Islands	60.24°N 01.51°W	HU2751
Hest Bank	Lancashire	54.08°N 02.81°W	SD4766
Hesters Way	Gloucestershire	51.90°N 02.11°W	SO9223
Hestingott	Shetland Islands	59.89°N 01.32°W	HU3812
Hestinsetter	Shetland Islands	60.18°N 01.47°W	HU2945
Heston	Hounslow	51.48°N 00.38°W	TQ1277
Hestwall	Orkney Islands	59.02°N 03.30°W	HY2516
Heswall	Wirral	53.33°N 03.11°W	SJ2683
Hethe	Oxfordshire	51.95°N 01.14°W	SP5929
Hethel	Norfolk	52.55°N 01.19°E	TG1700
Hethelpit Cross	Gloucestershire	51.95°N 02.33°W	SO7729
Hethersett	Norfolk	52.59°N 01.17°E	TG1504
Hethersgill	Cumbria	54.99°N 02.83°W	NY4767
Hetherside	Cumbria	54.98°N 02.89°W	NY4366
Hetherson Green	Cheshire	53.03°N 02.71°W	SJ5249
Hett	Durham	54.71°N 01.56°W	NZ2836
Hetton	North Yorkshire	54.01°N 02.06°W	SD9658
Hetton Downs	Sunderland	54.82°N 01.45°W	NZ3548
Hetton-le-Hill	Durham	54.79°N 01.45°W	NZ3545
Hetton-le-Hole	Sunderland	54.81°N 01.45°W	NZ3547
Heugh	Northumberland	55.05°N 01.87°W	NZ0873
Heugh-head	Aberdeenshire	57.18°N 03.02°W	NJ3811
Heveningham	Suffolk	52.29°N 01.41°E	TM3372
Hever	Kent	51.17°N 00.10°E	TQ4744
Heversham	Cumbria	54.24°N 02.78°W	SD4983
Hevingham	Norfolk	52.74°N 01.24°E	TG1921
Hewas Water	Cornwall	50.30°N 04.86°W	SW9649
Hewelsfield	Gloucestershire	51.71°N 02.63°W	SO5602
Hewelsfield Common	Gloucestershire	51.71°N 02.66°W	SO5402
Hewer Hill	Cumbria	54.73°N 02.97°W	NY3738
Hew Green	North Yorkshire	54.01°N 01.65°W	SE2358
Hewish	Somerset	50.86°N 02.82°W	ST4208
Hewish	North Somerset	51.37°N 02.86°W	ST4064
Hewood	Dorset	50.81°N 02.92°W	ST3502
Heworth	Gateshead	54.94°N 01.56°W	NZ2861
Heworth	York	53.96°N 01.07°W	SE6152
Hexham	Northumberland	54.96°N 02.11°W	NY9363
Hextable	Kent	51.40°N 00.16°E	TQ5170
Hexthorpe	Doncaster	53.51°N 01.15°W	SE5602
Hexton	Hertfordshire	51.95°N 00.40°W	TL1030
Hexworthy	Devon	50.53°N 03.90°W	SX6572
Hey	Lancashire	53.88°N 02.18°W	SD8843
Heybridge (Maldon)	Essex	51.74°N 00.67°E	TL8508
Heybridge (Brentwood)	Essex	51.65°N 00.35°E	TQ6398
Heybridge Basin	Essex	51.73°N 00.70°E	TL8707
Heybrook Bay	Devon	50.31°N 04.12°W	SX4948
Heydon	Cambridgeshire	52.04°N 00.08°E	TL4340
Heydon	Norfolk	52.79°N 01.12°E	TG1127
Heydour	Lincolnshire	52.93°N 00.51°W	TF0039
Hey Green	Kirklees	53.60°N 01.95°W	SE0312
Heyheads	Tameside	53.50°N 02.03°W	SD9801
Hey Houses	Lancashire	53.75°N 03.00°W	SD3429
Heylipol	Argyll and Bute	56.48°N 06.92°W	NL9743
Heylor	Shetland Islands	60.51°N 01.47°W	HU2981
Heyope	Powys	52.35°N 03.13°W	SO2374
Heyrod	Tameside	53.48°N 02.04°W	SJ9799
Heysham	Lancashire	54.04°N 02.90°W	SD4161
Heyshaw	North Yorkshire	54.04°N 01.74°W	SE1761
Heyshott	West Sussex	50.95°N 00.73°W	SU8918
Heyshott Green	West Sussex	50.95°N 00.73°W	SU8918
Heyside	Oldham	53.55°N 02.10°W	SD9307
Heytesbury	Wiltshire	51.17°N 02.11°W	ST9242
Heythrop	Oxfordshire	51.94°N 01.49°W	SP3527
Heywood	Rochdale	53.58°N 02.22°W	SD8510
Heywood	Wiltshire	51.27°N 02.18°W	ST8753
