= USS Henley =

USS Henley has been the name of three ships in the United States Navy named for Robert Henley. A fourth ship was named for his brother, John D. Henley.

- USS Henley (DD-39), was a Paulding-class destroyer, launched in 1912, and served in World War I. She then served in the United States Coast Guard from 1924 to 1930. She was sold in 1934
- USS Henley (DD-391), was a Bagley-class destroyer, launched in 1937, served in World War II and sank in battle in October 1943
- USS Henley (DD-762), was an Allen M. Sumner-class destroyer, built in 1945 and served until 1973

== See also ==
- USS John D. Henley (DD-553), was a Fletcher-class destroyer, launched in 1945, served in World War II and sold for scrap in 1974
