= David Henley-Welch =

English cricketer

Personal information
- Full name: David Francis Henley-Welch
- Born: 21 July 1923; Melton, Suffolk, England
- Died: 20 February 2006 (aged 82); San Rafael, Ibiza, Spain
- Batting: Right-handed
- Bowling: Right-arm fast-medium
- Relatives: Anthony Henley (grandfather); Robert Henley (great-uncle); Francis Henley (uncle)

Domestic team information
- Years: Team
- 1949: Minor Counties
- 1946–1948: Oxford University
- 1946–1957: Suffolk

Career statistics
Competition	First-class
Matches	17
Runs scored	558
Batting average	21.46
100s/50s	–/3
Top score	58
Balls bowled	1,627
Wickets	23
Bowling average	40.47
5 wickets in innings	–
10 wickets in match	–
Best bowling	3/28
Catches/stumpings	12/–
- Source: Cricinfo, 17 October 2015

David Francis Henley-Welch (born David Francis Henley; 21 July 1923 – 20 February 2006) was an English cricketer active in first-class cricket from 1946–1949, but was mostly associated with minor counties cricket where he played for Suffolk. He played as an all-rounder who was a right-handed batsman and right-arm fast-medium bowler.

Henley-Welch was born into a cricketing family with a long association with cricket in Suffolk. He was educated at Harrow School, where he captained the school cricket team in 1941, before proceeding to study at Trinity College, Oxford. He made his debut in first-class cricket while at Oxford, debuting in 1946 for Oxford University Cricket Club against Gloucestershire at the University Parks. He played five first-class matches for the university in 1946, including one against the touring Indians. Later in August 1946, he made his debut for Suffolk in Minor Counties Championship against Berkshire at Felixstowe. He made seven first-class appearances for the university in 1947, including winning a last-gasp Blue when he played in the season-ending varsity match at Lord's following a loss of form from Australian Jika Travers, with Henley-Welch hitting a rapid half century in the match. He also played a first-class match for the Free Foresters against Oxford University in 1947. He played three further first-class matches for the university in 1948, but lost his place in the team to future South Africa captain Clive van Ryneveld. In fifteen first-class matches for Oxford, Henley-Welch scored 480 runs, averaging 21.81, with a highest score of 58. With the ball in hand, he took 18 wickets, at an average of 42.66, with best figures of 3/44. He changed his surname from Henley to the double-barrelled Henley-Welch in September 1948. His continued association with Suffolk in minor counties cricket led to his selection for the combined Minor Counties cricket team for their first-class fixture against Yorkshire at Lord's in 1949, which marked his final appearance in first-class cricket. He continued to play minor counties cricket for Suffolk until 1957, by which point he had appeared 48 times for the county, scoring over 2,000 runs.

He died at San Rafael in Ibiza on 20 February 2006. His grandfather, great uncle, and uncle were all first-class cricketers.
