= William Hendley =

William Hendley may refer to:

- Bill Hendley (1834–1895), New Zealand cricketer
- William Hendley (priest) (1691–1724), Church of England clergyman

== See also ==
- William Henley (disambiguation)
