= Henley College =

Henley College may refer to:

- Henley College Coventry, a former further education college in Coventry, West Midlands
- The Henley College (Henley-on-Thames), a sixth form college in Henley-on-Thames, Oxfordshire
- Henley Management College, South Africa, a campus of the Henley Business School

== See also ==
- Henley (disambiguation)
- Henley High School (disambiguation)
