= Fenley =

Fenley is a surname. Notable people with the surname include:

- Molissa Fenley (born 1954), American choreographer
- Stanley Fenley (1896–1972), English cricketer
- Warren Fenley (1922–2009), American basketball player

== See also ==
- Finley (name)
- Henley (name)
