= John Darnall =

John Darnall may refer to:

- Sir John Darnall (died 1706), English lawyer
- Sir John Darnall (died 1735) (1672–1735), his son, English lawyer
