= John Henley =

John Henley may refer to:

- John Henley (preacher) (1692–1756), English clergyman
- John D. Henley (1781–1835), U.S. Navy officer
  - USS John D. Henley (DD-553) (1942–1970), American Fletcher-class destroyer
- John T. Henley (1921–2012), American politician and pharmacist in North Carolina
