= USS Henley (DD-762) =

Allen M. Sumner-class destroyer

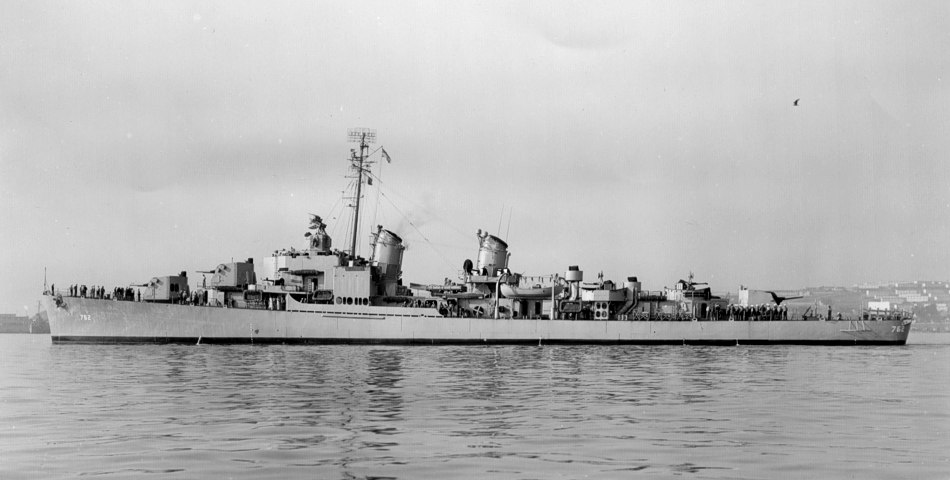
- USS Henley

History

United States
- Name: Henley
- Namesake: Robert Henley
- Builder: Bethlehem Steel, San Francisco
- Laid down: 8 February 1944
- Launched: 8 April 1945
- Commissioned: 8 October 1946
- Decommissioned: c.1973
- Stricken: 1 July 1973
- Fate: Sold 24 June 1974 and broken up for scrap

General characteristics
- Class & type: Allen M. Sumner-class destroyer
- Displacement: 2,200 tons
- Length: 376 ft 6 in (114.76 m)
- Beam: 40 ft (12 m)
- Draft: 15 ft 8 in (4.78 m)
- Propulsion: 60,000 shp (45,000 kW); 2 propellers
- Speed: 34 knots (63 km/h; 39 mph)
- Range: 6,500 nmi (12,000 km; 7,500 mi) at 15 kn (28 km/h; 17 mph)
- Complement: 336
- Armament: 6 × 5 in (127 mm)/38 cal. guns, 12 × 40 mm AA guns, 11 × 20 mm AA guns, 10 × 21 inch (533 mm) torpedo tubes, 6 × depth charge projectors, 2 × depth charge tracks

USS Henley (DD-762), an Allen M. Sumner-class destroyer, was the fourth ship of the United States Navy to be named Henley, was named after Captain Robert Henley (5 January 1783 – 7 October 1828); an officer in the United States Navy during the Quasi-War with France, the War of 1812 and the Second Barbary War.

In addition to the three destroyers named USS Henley, there was an additional ship, named USS John D. Henley which was named after Captain John D. Henley, a brother of Captain Robert Henley.

The fourth Henley (DD-762) was launched on 8 April 1945 by Bethlehem Steel Co., San Francisco; sponsored by Mrs. George S. Wheaton; and commissioned on 8 October 1946.

== History ==
After shakedown in the Pacific, Henley headed east, reporting to the Sonar School at Key West on 19 February 1947 for a five-month tour of duty. She then reported to Norfolk, Virginia from which she sailed 28 July for her first Mediterranean cruise, which terminated on 1 December at Boston. On her second tour in the Mediterranean Sea, Henley patrolled with other United Nations ships in the summer of 1948 as the Israeli-Arab dispute threatened to erupt into war. After a year of tactical training exercises and fleet maneuvers, Henley decommissioned at Charleston, South Carolina on 15 March 1950. Less than six months later, with the outbreak of war in Korea, Henley went back in commission, rejoining the active fleet 23 September. Shakedown over, she sailed July 1951 for another tour with the 6th Fleet in the Mediterranean Sea. Henley was detached from this duty and made a cruise to northern European ports, including a journey up the Seine to Rouen, before returning to Norfolk in February 1952.

In company with Destroyer Division 221, Henley departed Norfolk on 25 September 1953 for a world cruise which was to take her 44,000 miles in 218 days. During this period, Henley sailed through the Mediterranean Sea and the Suez Canal, participated in the filming of The Bridges at Toko-Ri off the Korean and Japanese coasts, operated with the 7th Fleet in Asian waters, and returned to the States via the Panama Canal and the Caribbean Sea. Following years fell into a pattern for Henley as she alternated Mediterranean cruises with anti-submarine warfare and other tactical exercises off the east coast and in the Caribbean Sea. In 1959 she joined Task Force 47 for the Inland Seas Cruise to the Great Lakes through the newly completed St. Lawrence Seaway. Nearly 75,000 mid-westerners visited this representative of the "salt-water navy" in her two-month cruise.

During the Cuban Missile Crisis in the fall of 1962 over offensive missiles stationed in Cuba, Henley joined the fleet "quarantining" the island. Following this, she then returned to a peacetime pattern of readiness operations.

On 1 October 1964, Henley became a Group I, Naval Reserve training ship assigned to the Anti-Submarine Warfare Component of the Naval Reserve. Following overhaul at Newport News, Virginia, and refresher training at Guantanamo Bay, Cuba, she began the first of numerous Naval Reserve training cruises out of Norfolk 1 May 1965. Manned by a nucleus crew of 100 officers and men on active duty, she cruised along the Atlantic coast and into the Caribbean Sea during the next eight years and provided valuable service as an at-sea training platform for hundreds of Naval Reservists. Into mid-1972 she continued this vital duty for officers and men of the Naval Reserve and the nation. On July 2, 1973, the last all-gun Sumner-class destroyer remaining in the fleet was decommissioned. She was sold for scrap on June 24, 1974, to Union Minerals & Alloy, New York for $257,122.00.
