= Anthony Henley =

Anthony Henley may refer to:

- Anthony Henley (1667–1711), English Member of Parliament
- Anthony Henley (died 1748), English Member of Parliament
- Anthony Henley (cricketer) (1846–1916), English cricketer
- Anthony Henley, 3rd Baron Henley (1825–1898), British peer and Liberal Member of Parliament
