= HMS Ambush (1814) =

American gunboat built in Baltimore

History

United States
- Name: Gunboat No. 5
- Builder: William Price, Baltimore
- Launched: 1 March 1805
- Fate: Captured by the Royal Navy, 14 December 1814

United Kingdom
- Name: HMS Ambush
- Acquired: by capture, 14 December 1814
- Fate: Sold, 1815

General characteristics
- Type: Gunboat
- Sail plan: Lateen sail
- Complement: 36 (1813)
- Armament: 2 × 32-pounder guns (1805); 1 × 24-pounder & 4 × 6-pounder guns (1813)

HMS Ambush, or Ambush No. 5, was the American Gunboat No. 5, launched in 1805. She served in the Mediterranean later that year. The Royal Navy captured her at the Battle of Lake Borgne on 14 December 1814. She was sold in 1815.

== US service (1805–14) ==
Gunboat No. 5 was built in Baltimore by William Price as one of a number of gunboats that President Thomas Jefferson had built for the defense of the United States. Price built her to a design by Josiah Fox, "Head Ship Carpenter and Navy Constructor", and launched her on 1 March 1805. She may have been a double-ender, initially armed with two 32-pounder guns (one fore and one aft). She had 2,600 pounds of copper in the sheathing for her hull and in her fittings, had a single mast amidships, and was rigged with a lateen sail. Sailing Master Alexander Harrison was named to command her.

Gunboat No. 5 left Hampton Roads on 15 May and sailed to the Mediterranean, in company with Gunboat No. 10.{{Gunboat No. 5 is not the Gunboat No. 5 that Commodore Edward Preble borrowed from the Kingdom of the Two Sicilies in 1804 for use against Tripoli. He returned that vessel, the three other gunboats, and two bomb ketches he had borrowed, later in 1804.}} In 1805 the navy sent eight gunboats to the Mediterranean. For the voyage across the Atlantic, the gunboats received a dandy rig, false keels, and lee boards. They stowed their guns below, but carried light guns, possibly swivel guns, in order to have some means of defense.

No. 5 arrived at Gibraltar on 14 June. She then sailed to Syracuse, staying there 8–9 July. She was at Tunis in August, and then returned to winter-over at Syracuse.

Although Gunboats No. 2 through 10 (minus No. 7) arrived in the Mediterranean too late to see action, they remained there with Commodore Rodgers's squadron until summer 1806. They then sailed back to the United States. (Note: Although Silverstone reports that on 12 June 1805 Gunboat No. 5 encountered a Royal Navy vessel that impressed three seamen, Smith and Tucker report that the incident of impressment involved Gunboat No. 6, which was under the command of James Lawrence. He was reprimanded for having permitted the British to take the men, something that may have contributed to his order to his men "Don't give up the ship", when his USS Chesapeake encountered HMS Shannon.) No. 5 arrived back at Charleston on 21 July 1806. She then sailed to Gosport, Virginia, where she arrived on 30 July. There she was laid up.

Gunboat No. 5 next took up station at Norfolk, Virginia. In July 1806 she joined gunboats Nos. 4, 6 and 10, and the brigs Vixen and Vengeance on a cruise. During the war-scare immediately after the Chesapeake–Leopard affair, No. 5 was in the second division of Stephen Decatur's sixteen gunboats at Norfolk.

Lieutenant James Gibbon took command in August 1807. His replacement, in November, was Lieutenant John Davis.

On 13 March 1808 she sailed for Baltimore to assist the Collector of Customs there in enforcing the Embargo Act of 1807 and the subsequent Non-Intercourse Act.

Robert Henley took command at Baltimore on 9 April 1808. (Henley later would command two divisions of 15 gunboats, Gunboat No. 5 not among them, that drove three British frigates from Hampton Roads on 20 June 1813.) At some point during her service enforcing the embargo Gunboat No. 5 detained the sloop John Upshaw. It was probably before that interception that Gunboat No. 5 sank.

She was under the command of Sailing Master B. G. Hipkins when on 18 June 1808 a squall sank her off Holland Island in the Chesapeake. She lost three men drowned – the purser's steward and two marines – before the schooner Victory, which saw the loss, could rescue the remaining crew. Though she sank in some six fathoms of water, she clearly was raised as she would continue to serve for at least seven more years.

In February 1809 No. 5 Midshipman Thomas C. Magruder took command, and she was ordered to transfer to New Orleans from Baltimore as part of a move by the U.S. government to build up its forces there to enforce the embargo. The gunboats were not effective in enforcing the embargo, and in March 1809 the Non-Intercourse Act replaced the embargo and authorized trade with all nations, save Britain and France.

She was at Havana in May 1809. Magruder was involved in improper conduct, which caused the Secretary of the Navy to order an investigation in June and the recovery of No. 5 on 25 July. The conduct involved keeping a woman on board. Lieutenant Alexander C. Harrison took command in August. (Note: Magruder resigned from the U.S. Navy on 22 January 1812.)

No. 5 remained at New Orleans, and in May 1812 her commander was Midshipman James Roney. At the time, her armament consisted of one 24-pounder gun and two 6-pounder guns. She was still among the 13 gunboats there in November 1812. By March 1813 there were only five effective gunboats, the others being too rotten to carry cannon or having been disarmed to provide guns for USS Louisiana.

In February 1813, her commander was Lieutenant George Merrill. In April, gunboats No. 5, No. 22, No. 65, No. 156, No. 162 and No. 163 sailed for Mobile, Alabama, under the overall command of Captain John Shaw. There, on 19 April, the expeditionary force captured Fort Charlotte from the Spanish. At the time, No. 5 was armed with one 24-pounder and four 6-pounder guns.

In August 1814, Sailing Master Jonathan D. Ferris took command. Under his command Gunboat No. 5 participated in the destruction of the pirates and smugglers at Barataria Bay in September. (Note: The Congressional report refers to Ferris as a lieutenant, but most other reports give his rank as "Sailing Master". Tucker gives his rank both as Lieutenant and Sailing Master.) She captured an unarmed pirate brig on 23 September.

Ferris was still her commander at the Battle of Lake Borgne. At this time she had a crew of 36 and was armed with a 24-pounder gun and four 12-pounder carronades. No. 5 was the fourth of the five gunboats to be captured; in the battle her 24-pounder gun had been dismounted.

== British service (1814–15) ==
After her capture the British took Gunboat No. 5 to the West Indies, where she remained in British service until at least 30 June 1815. The Admiralty formally purchased her in 1815 in the West Indies, renamed her Ambush, and sold her that same year. Prize money for her and the other vessels captured at the battle was paid in July 1821.
