= Ray Lucas (disambiguation) =

Ray or Raymond Lucas may refer to:

- Ray Lucas (born 1972), American football player
- Ray Lucas (baseball) (1908–1969), American baseball player
- Ray Lucas, drummer on Flute By-Laws and other albums
- Raymond Lucas (cyclist), (1918–2006), French cyclist
- Raymond B. Lucas (1890–1966), American justice

== See also ==
- Lucas Raymond (born 2002), Swedish hockey player
