= Heugh =

Heugh may refer to:

== People ==
- Cavill Heugh (born 1962), Australian former professional rugby league footballer
- Marlon Heugh (born 1990), South African soccer player

== Places ==
- Heugh, Northumberland, a location in England
- Heugh Battery, located on the Headland at Hartlepool, County Durham, England
  - Heugh Lighthouse, a navigation light on The Headland in Hartlepool, in north-east England
- Peniel Heugh, a hill near Ancrum and Nisbet in the Scottish Borders
