= Frank Hollingsworth =

American judge (1892–1964)

Eli Frank Hollingsworth (March 16, 1892 – March 18, 1964) was a Missouri attorney and judge who served as a justice of the Supreme Court of Missouri from 1950 until his death in 1964.

== Early life, education, and career ==
Born in Pike County, Missouri, Hollingsworth attended the public schools of Vandalia, Missouri, and received an LL.B. from the Chattanooga College of Law in 1915.

He served as city attorney of Vandalia from 1916 to 1921, and as prosecuting attorney of Audrain County, Missouri, from 1921 to 1924. In 1924, he was elected to the Missouri Senate as a Democrat, serving until 1928. In 1928, Hollingsworth filed to run for his previous office as prosecuting attorney of Audrain County, but in June of that year, despite Despite running unopposed, announced his withdrawal from the race on the grounds that private business would require his absence from the county from time to time.

== Judicial service ==
On October 11, 1939, Governor Lloyd C. Stark appointed Hollingsworth as a judge of the Missouri Eleventh Judicial Circuit. Hollingsworth was then re-elected to that office in 1940 and 1946.

In August 1950, Governor Forrest Smith elevated Hollingsworth to a seat on the state supreme court vacated by the death of Albert M. Clark. In 1952, Hollingsworth was re-elected to a twelve year term on the court, serving for a total of 14 years, including a two-year stint as chief justice, from July 1958 to April 1960. He had planned to step down at the end of 1964.

== Personal life and death ==
On June 6, 1917, Hollingsworth married Lillie Runyan of Kansas City, Missouri. They had a daughter, who died a year before he did.

Hollingsworth died of a heart attack two days after his 72nd birthday.

Political offices
Preceded by Albert M. Clark	Justice of the Missouri Supreme Court; 1950–1964	Succeeded by Fred L. Henley
