= USS Henley (DD-39) =

Paulding-class destroyer

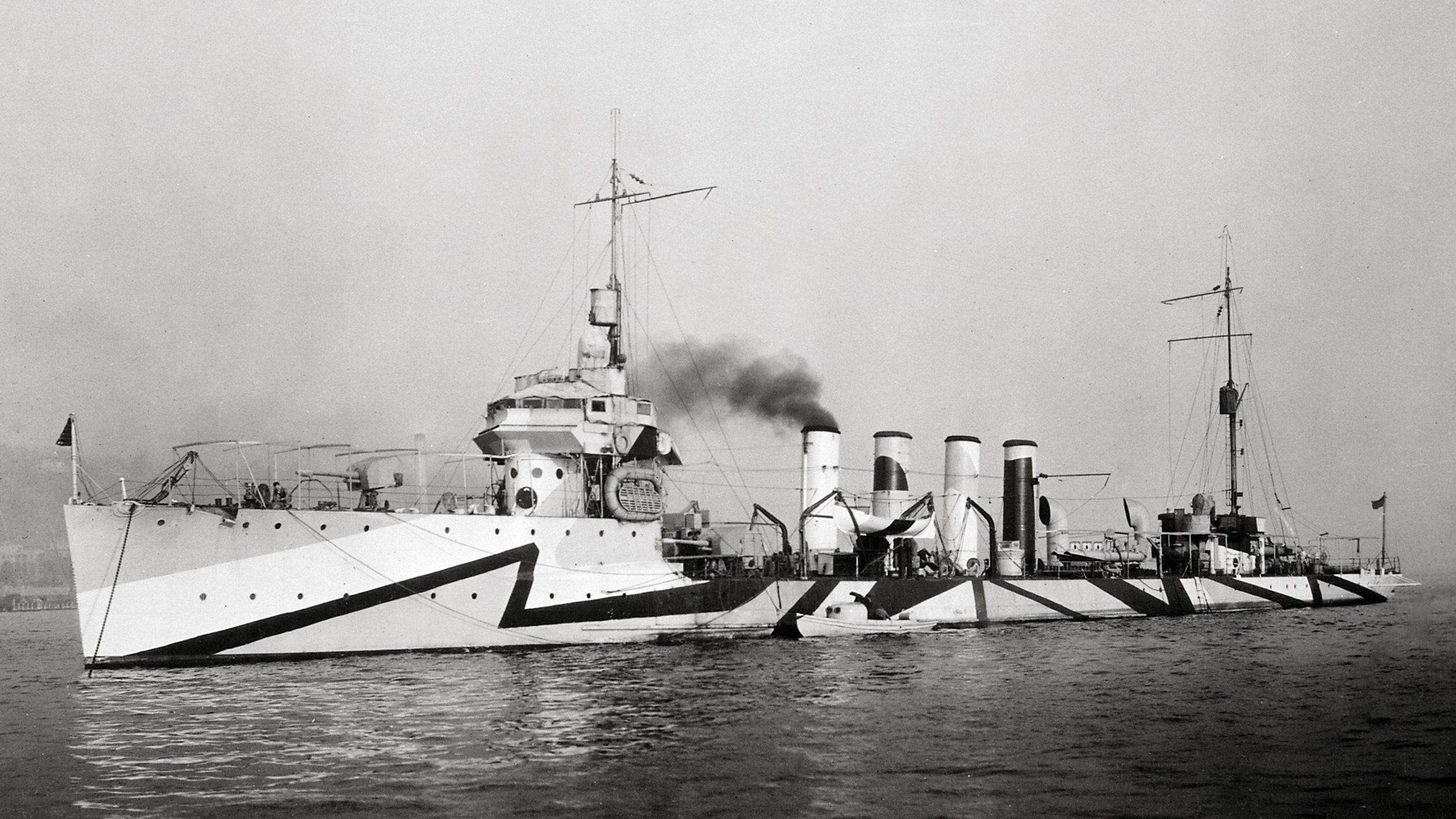
- USS Henley (DD-39), port bow, camouflaged, 1918 at Queenstown, Ireland.

History

United States
- Name: Henley
- Namesake: Captain Robert Henley, awarded Congressional Gold Medal
- Builder: Fore River Shipbuilding Company, Quincy, Massachusetts
- Cost: $667,235.52
- Laid down: 17 July 1911
- Launched: 3 April 1912
- Sponsored by: Miss Constance Henley Kane
- Commissioned: 6 December 1912
- Decommissioned: 12 December 1919
- Stricken: 5 July 1934
- Identification: Hull symbol:DD-39; Code letters:NHA
- Fate: transferred to the United States Coast Guard, 16 May 1924

United States
- Name: Henley
- Acquired: 16 May 1924
- Commissioned: 14 November 1924
- Decommissioned: 30 January 1931
- Identification: Hull symbol:CG-12
- Fate: returned to the US Navy, 30 January 1931; Sold for scrapping August 22, 1934

General characteristics
- Class & type: Paulding-class destroyer
- Displacement: 742 long tons (754 t) normal; 887 long tons (901 t) full load
- Length: 293 ft 10 in (89.56 m)
- Beam: 27 ft (8.2 m)
- Draft: 8 ft 4 in (2.54 m) (mean)
- Installed power: 12,000 ihp (8,900 kW)
- Propulsion: 4 × boilers; 2 × Parsons Direct Drive Turbines; 2 × shafts
- Speed: 29.5 kn (33.9 mph; 54.6 km/h); 30.32 kn (34.89 mph; 56.15 km/h) (Speed on Trial)
- Complement: 4 officers 87 enlisted
- Armament: 5 × 3 in (76 mm)/50 caliber guns; 6 × 18 inch (450 mm) torpedo tubes (3 × 2)

The first USS Henley (DD-39) was a modified Paulding-class destroyer in the United States Navy during World War I and later in the United States Coast Guard, designated as CG-12. She was named for Robert Henley.

Henley was launched on 3 April 1912 by the Fore River Shipbuilding Company, in Quincy, Massachusetts; sponsored by Miss Constance Henley Kane, great-grandniece or Robert Henley; and commissioned at Boston, Massachusetts, on 6 December 1912.

== Pre-World War I ==
After training and shakedown, Henley joined the US Atlantic Torpedo Fleet at Newport, Rhode Island, for a peacetime career of tactical exercises and training maneuvers along the coast from the Caribbean to the North Atlantic. On 22 April 1914, she joined the fleet off Tampico, Mexico, to protect American citizens and property in the face of revolution in that country. During this period, Henley also saw duty transporting refugees and supplies. With war in Europe that fall, she began Neutrality Patrol along the coast and checked belligerent vessels in American ports.

== World War I ==
When America entered World War I in April 1917, Henley continued patrol along the coast and also escorted fuel ships to the destroyers guarding America's first troop convoy on 13 June. For the remainder of the war, Henley performed convoy duty along the coast and carried out anti-submarine patrol off New York Harbor. Henley put in at the Philadelphia Navy Yard on 22 December 1918 and decommissioned there on 12 December 1919.

== Inter-war period ==
Transferred to the Coast Guard on 16 May 1924, she served in the Rum Patrol. She was originally stationed at Stapleton, New York and then transferred to New London, Connecticut.

She returned to the Navy on 8 May 1931 and was sold for scrap to Michael Flynn Inc of Brooklyn, New York on 22 August 1934.
