= USS Henley (DD-391) =

Bagley-class destroyer

Coordinates: 7°40′S 148°6′E

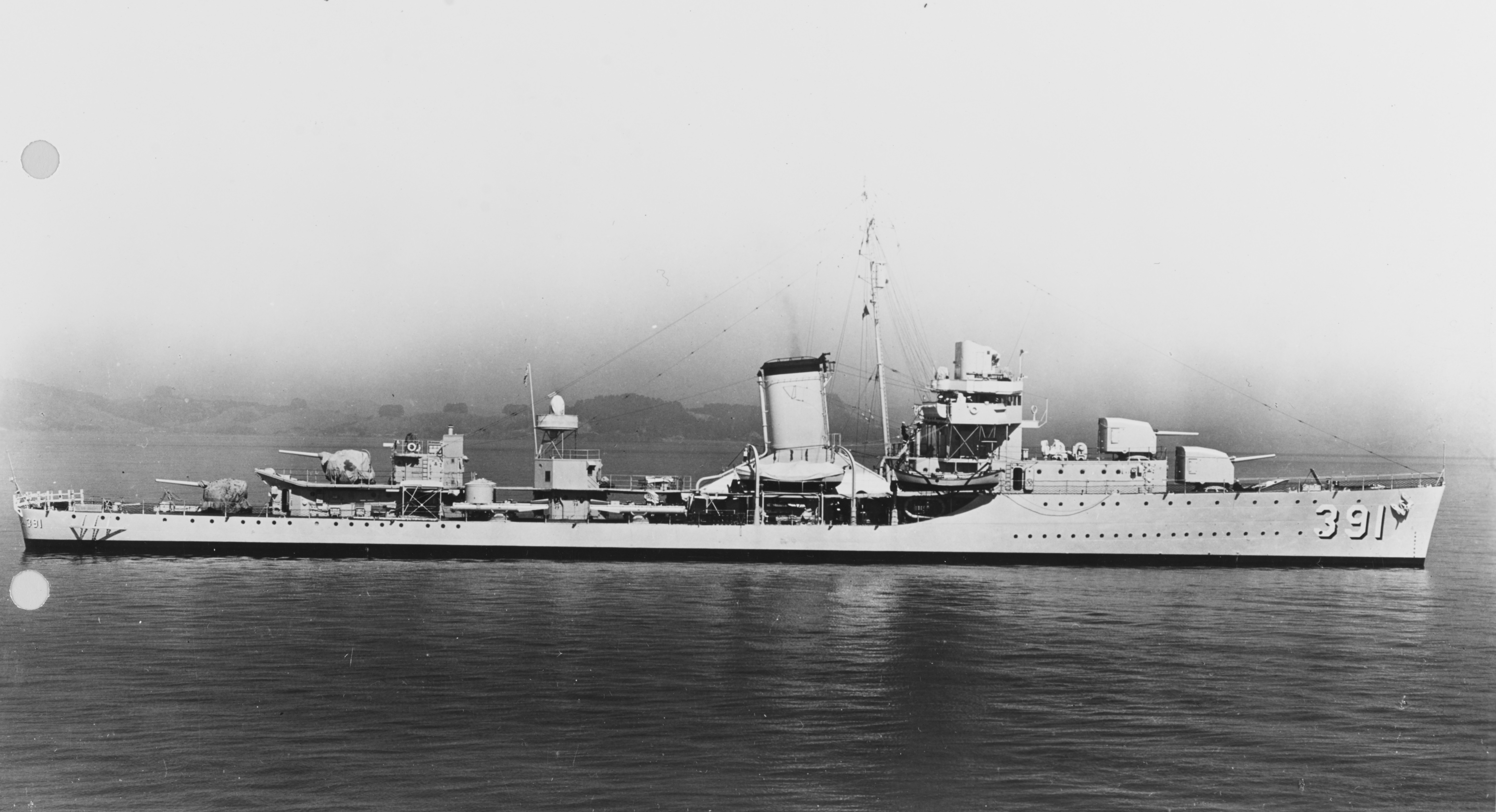
- USS Henley (DD-391)

History

United States
- Namesake: Robert Henley
- Builder: Mare Island Navy Yard
- Laid down: 28 October 1935
- Launched: 12 January 1937
- Commissioned: 14 August 1937
- Fate: Sunk 3 October 1943

General characteristics
- Class & type: Bagley-class destroyer
- Displacement: 2,245 tons (full), 1,500 tons (light)
- Length: 341 ft 8 in (104.14 m)
- Beam: 35 ft 6 in (10.82 m)
- Draft: 12 ft 10 in (3.91 m) full, 10 ft 4 in (3.15 m) light
- Propulsion: 49,000 shp (37,000 kW); 2 propellers (screws)
- Speed: 38.5 knots (71.3 km/h; 44.3 mph)
- Range: 6,500 nmi (12,000 km; 7,500 mi) at 12 knots (22 km/h; 14 mph)
- Complement: 158 (248 wartime)
- Armament: 4 × 5-inch/38-caliber guns; 4 × .50 cal (12.7 mm) machine guns; 4 × quad 21-inch (533 mm) torpedo tubes; 2 × depth charge tracks

USS Henley (DD-391), a Bagley-class destroyer, was the second ship of the United States Navy to be named after Captain Robert Henley, an officer in the United States Navy during the Quasi-War with France, the War of 1812 and the Second Barbary War.

== History ==
The second Henley (DD-391) was launched 12 January 1937 by the Mare Island Navy Yard, Vallejo, California; sponsored by Miss Beryl Henley Joslin, a collateral descendant of Captain Robert Henley; and commissioned 14 August 1937.

After shakedown in the Pacific and Hawaiian waters, Henley joined the Pacific Battle Force, Destroyer Division 11, at San Diego 12 September 1938. She departed San Diego 14 April 1941 to join the Fleet at Pearl Harbor. When the Japanese attacked Pearl Harbor 7 December 1941, Henley was moored in East Loch with battle stations manned, a green sailor having sounded general quarters instead of quarters for muster. This fortunate mistake gave Henley under the command of Lieutenant Francis Edward Fleck Jr., the opportunity to fire the first destroyer shots as the initial wave of enemy planes swooped in. A bomb exploded 150 yards off her port bow as she slipped her chain from the buoy, and, as she cleared, she received a signal that a submarine was in the harbor. Henley maneuvered through the smoke, fire, and confusion and sped out of the channel. Her gunners shot down one dive bomber with her .50 cal. guns and shared credit for another. Conned by Fleck—both her commanding officer and executive officer were ashore when the attack began—Henley dropped depth charges on a sonar contact, possibly a midget submarine, outside the harbor, and continued to blaze away at the enemy with her guns. In the following weeks Henley operated with the task forces to reinforce Wake Island and conducted patrol for the protection of Midway and convoy lanes.

Henley carried out convoy and antisubmarine duty, primarily in Australian waters. On 11 May 1942 she rescued the survivors of Neosho and Sims, sunk during the Battle of the Coral Sea. She departed for Wellington 22 July 1942 to escort transports to Guadalcanal. As American forces stormed ashore in the Solomons 7 August, Henley patrolled on an ASW station, coming under fire from enemy planes but suffering no casualties and assisting in shooting down two in the process. As the fierce struggle for Guadalcanal raged, the destroyer remained in the area to screen ships bringing up supplies and reinforcements until 29 August. Henley then set course south, and remained in Australian and New Guinea waters until September 1943 on plane guard, convoy duty, and antisubmarine patrol.

== Fate ==
When Australian troops established a beachhead at Finschafen, New Guinea, 21 September 1943, Henley formed a part of their protective screen. Attacked by 10 Japanese torpedo bombers, she claimed to have shot down 3 and assisted in downing 3 others in a fierce half-hour engagement. However, the valiant ship's wartime career, begun in the chaos at Pearl Harbor, was drawing to a close. On 3 October 1943 Henley was steaming with Reid and Smith on an offensive sweep off Finschafen when her skipper sighted two torpedoes fired by the submarine Ro-108 heading for her. Split-second maneuvering permitted Henley to evade those two torpedoes; but a third was immediately sighted, closing too fast and too near to be avoided. Henley was struck on the port side, with the torpedo exploding in the number 1 fire-room, destroying her boilers, breaking her keel, and displacing her bow about 30 degrees from the longitudinal axis of the ship.

At 18:29, with all her crew having abandoned ship, Henley went down, stern first. Her companion destroyers searched for the sub, then returned to rescue Henley's survivors, who had lashed their life-rafts together and were using flashlights as signals. Eighteen officers and 225 men were rescued, with 1 officer and 14 men missing.

== Honors ==
Henley earned four battle stars for her participation in World War II.
