= Justice Henley =

Justice Henley may refer to:

- Fred L. Henley (1911–1994), judge and chief justice of the Supreme Court of Missouri
- George Henley (judge) (1890–1965), associate justice of the Supreme Court of Indiana
