= Albert M. Clark =

American judge (1879–1950)

Albert M. Clark (March 4, 1879 – June 9, 1950) was a justice of the Supreme Court of Missouri from 1939 to 1950.

Born in Lawson, Ray County, Missouri, Clark graduated from Vanderbilt University in 1900. He served in the Missouri House of Representatives and the Missouri Senate prior to his election to a ten-year term on the state supreme court in 1938. He was reelected in 1948, but died while serving in Jefferson City, Missouri, two years into his second term, at the age of 78.

Political offices
Preceded by Raymond B. Lucas	Justice of the Missouri Supreme Court; 1939–1950	Succeeded by Frank Hollingsworth
