= Ernest Remnant =

English cricketer

Personal information
- Full name: Ernest Richard Remnant
- Born: 1 May 1881; Croydon, Surrey, England
- Died: 18 March 1969 (aged 87); Harrow, London, England
- Batting: Right-handed
- Bowling: Slow left-arm orthodox
- Relatives: George Remnant (father)

Domestic team information
- Years: Team
- 1908–1922: Hampshire
- 1916/17: Europeans

Umpiring information
- FC umpired: 2 (1912)

Career statistics
Competition	First-class
Matches	124
Runs scored	2,877
Batting average	17.12
100s/50s	1/10
Top score	115*
Balls bowled	9,196
Wickets	172
Bowling average	27.32
5 wickets in innings	7
10 wickets in match	–
Best bowling	8/61
Catches/stumpings	60/–
- Source: Cricinfo, 1 March 2010

Ernest Richard Remnant (1 May 1881 — 18 March 1969) was an English first-class cricketer. Remnant made over 120 appearances in first-class cricket, the majority of which came for Hampshire, though he also played three first-class matches in British India during the First World War. In all first-class cricket, he scored nearly 3,000 runs and took over 170 wickets; he was utilised as an all-rounder who batted right-handed and bowled slow left-arm orthodox. After his playing career, he coached cricket at Harrow School.

== Pre-war cricket career ==
The son of the cricketer George Remnant, he was born at Croydon in May 1881. An all-round professional cricketer, Remnant made his debut in first-class cricket for Hampshire against Surrey at The Oval in the 1908 County Championship, with him making eleven appearances in his debut season. He played intermittently over the proceeding seasons, making five appearances in 1909 and two in 1910. Remnant established himself in the Hampshire starting eleven in 1911, making thirteen appearances; he scored his only first-class century during this season, making an unbeaten 115 against Kent at Southampton. The form he showed in this match, and subsequent good form, was described as "surprising" by The Illustrated Police News. During that season, Remnant also had some success with his slow left-arm orthodox bowling, taking 20 wickets and claiming his maiden five wicket haul against Somerset.

The following season, his eleven appearances met with little success. He did, however, stand as an umpire in two first-class matches that season. In the 1913 and 1914 seasons he made over twenty appearances in each, scoring 634 in 1913 and 877 runs in 1914, whilst taking 28 and 23 wickets respectively; in 1914, he achieved his best bowling figures to that point, taking 6 for 20 against the Marylebone Cricket Club at Lord's. With the outbreak of the First World War in July, first-class cricket was shortly thereafter suspended.

== WWI and post-war cricket ==
Remnant served in the British Army during the war as a non-commissioned officer with the 5th Battalion, Hampshire Regiment, alongside peers from Hampshire. He served for a proportion of the war in British India, where he played three first-class matches. The first of these was for an England XI against India at Bombay in December 1915, with the match played in aid of the Women's Branch of the Bombay Presidency War and Relief Fund. His second and third matches both came for the Europeans cricket team against the Hindus and the Parsees in the 1916–17 Bombay Quadrangular. He was invalided out of active service in 1919, a year after the war had ended.

Remnant resumed his first-class career with Hampshire in 1920, making eleven appearances in the County Championship. Though he did not have success with the bat in his return season, he nonetheless took 25 wickets and claimed one five wicket haul. His best season as a bowler came in 1921, when his eighteen matches yielded him 46 wickets at an average of 23.89, with four five wicket hauls; amongst these were his career best figures of 8 for 61 against Essex at Colchester. After four first-class appearances in 1922, Remnant retired. In total, he made 121 appearances in first-class cricket for Hampshire, scoring 2,843 runs at a batting average of 17.33. With the ball, he took 170 wickets at an average of 27.35, taking five wickets or more in an innings on seven occasions. When his first-class career came to an end, Remnant was employed as the assistant cricket coach at Harrow School. He was also renowned as a fine wood carver; his home in Harrow depicted carved scenes from the Battle of Hastings. Remnant died at Harrow on 18 March 1969.
