= Heribusta =

Coordinates: 57.652293°N 6.359247°W

Heribusta: Scottish Gaelic: Hearabusta
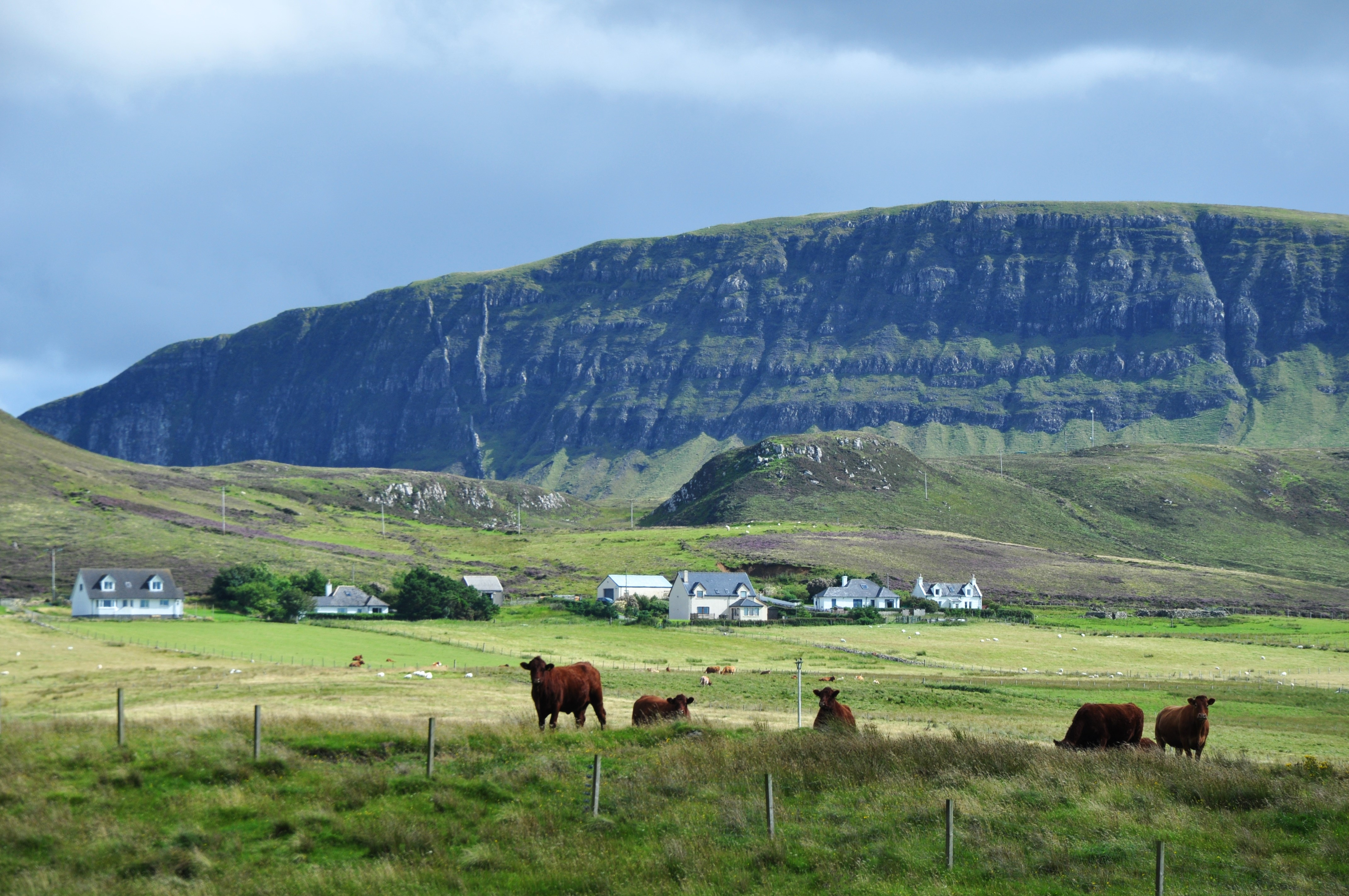

- Location within the Isle of Skye
- OS grid reference: NG 40137 71005
- Council area: Highland
- Lieutenancy area: Ross and Cromarty
- Country: Scotland
- Sovereign state: United Kingdom
- Post town: Kilmuir
- Postcode district: IV51 9YX
- Police: Scotland
- Fire: Scottish
- Ambulance: Scottish

Herbusta (Scottish Gaelic: Hearabusta), (also Heribusta), is a small crofting township on the Trotternish peninsula of the Isle of Skye in the Highlands of Scotland. It is part of the civil parish of Kilmuir.
Heribusta lies along a small road that branches off eastward from the A855 at Kilmuir Hall and rejoins the A855 1 mile further north near the Skye Museum of Island Life. Along this road one also finds the Kilmuir cemetery with the grave of Flora Macdonald and the headstone of fashion designer Lee Alexander McQueen. Heribusta is 5.8 kilometres (4 miles) north of Uig.

Herbusta has been farmed for many thousands of years, with remains of iron age enclosures still present. Herbusta received its name after the Norse colonisation of Skye in the 8th century. Where the name Herbusta is rooted in the old Norse. Hár (high), ‘Busta’ which comes from Old Norse for a farm and settlement, whence Herbusta may be ‘the high farmstead’. In the 1820’s Herbusta farm of 325 acres ( 223 arable) was converted into eight small farm holdings (crofts), for eight families

By 1878, the Inverness Shire records described Herbusta as: ‘A small district on which there are about a dozen croft houses, each one storey in height, thatched and in poor repair. Landlord Captain Fraser.’ Population of approx 27 Adults and 17 children (1881 census)

A hundred years later in the 1980's, there were six croft houses, mostly 2 storey, slated roofs and in good condition. Landlord, The Department of Agriculture and Fisheries. Population of approx 14 Adults and 13 children

By 2024 there were ten houses, with a number of them being single occupancy or as holiday homes. Population approx 10 Adults and 0 children

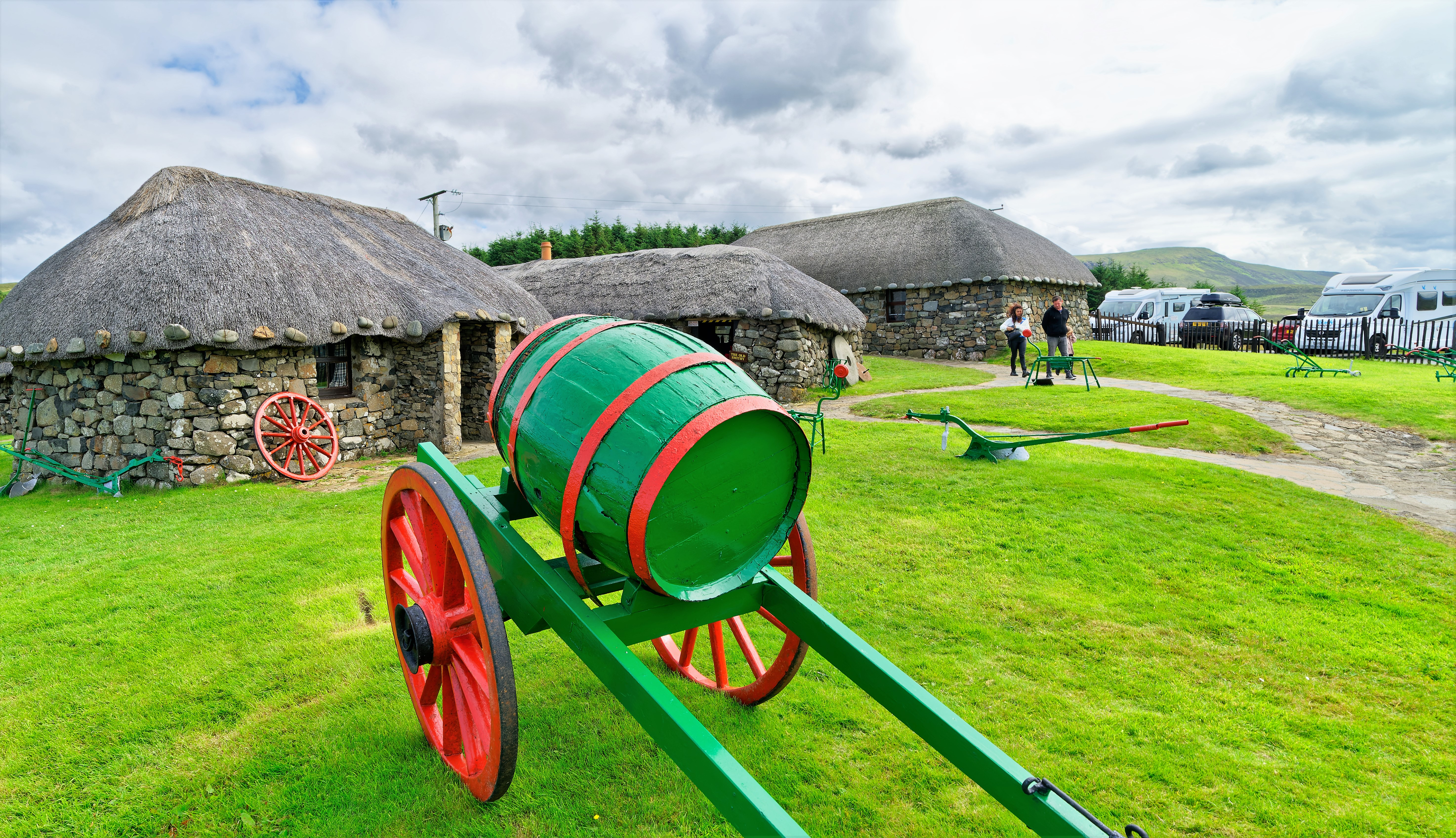
Skye Museum of Island Life

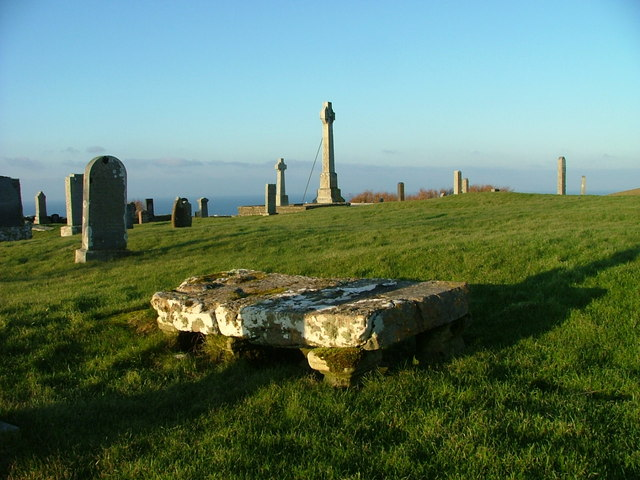
Kilmuir Cemetery

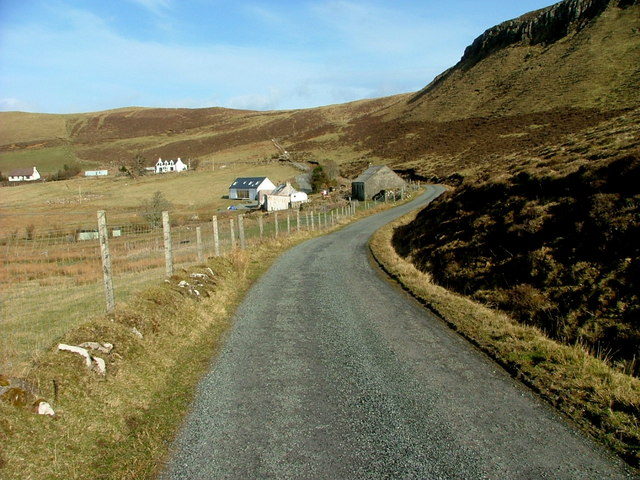
Minor road at Heribusta
