= Robert Henley (cricketer) =

English cricketer

Personal information
- Born: 10 June 1851; Sherborne, Dorset, England
- Died: 21 March 1889 (aged 37); Ovington, Hampshire, England
- Relatives: Anthony Henley (brother); Francis Henley (nephew)

Domestic team information
- Years: Team
- 1875: Hampshire

Career statistics
Competition	First-class
Matches	1
Runs scored	14
Batting average	14.00
100s/50s	0/0
Top score	14
Balls bowled	12
Wickets	0
Bowling average	–
5 wickets in innings	–
10 wickets in match	–
Best bowling	–
Catches/stumpings	0/–
- Source: Cricinfo, 14 February 2010

Robert Henley (10 June 1851 – 21 March 1889) was an English first-class cricketer and British Army officer.

The son of Cornish Henley, he was born at Sherborne in June 1851 and was educated there at Sherborne School. Henley was commissioned into the British Army when he purchased the rank of ensign into the King's Royal Rifle Corps in May 1870, with promotion to lieutenant following in November 1871. While garrisoned at Winchester, he played first-class cricket for Hampshire in 1875, making a single appearance against Kent at Winchester. He was absent hurt in Hampshire's first innings, but did bat in their second innings where he scored 14 runs before being dismissed by George Remnant. He also bowled three overs in the Kent first innings, without taking a wicket. In the King's Royal Rifle Corps, he was promoted to captain in October 1880, before being promoted to major in June 1885. Henley died suddenly on 21 March 1889 at his residence in Ovington, Hampshire. His elder brother, Anthony, was also a first-class cricketer, as was his nephew Francis Henley.
