= George Remnant =

English cricketer

Personal information
- Full name: George Henry Remnant
- Born: 20 November 1846; Rochester, Kent, England
- Died: 23 February 1941 (aged 94); Harrow, Middlesex, England
- Batting: Right-handed
- Bowling: Right-arm roundarm fast
- Relatives: Ernest Remnant (son)

Domestic team information
- Years: Team
- 1868–1878: Kent

Umpiring information
- FC umpired: 33 (1896–1898)

Career statistics
Competition	First-class
Matches	42
Runs scored	564
Batting average	7.94
100s/50s	0/1
Top score	62
Balls bowled	713
Wickets	19
Bowling average	17.10
5 wickets in innings	1
10 wickets in match	0
Best bowling	5/24
Catches/stumpings	23/–
- Source: Cricinfo, 21 March 2024

George Henry Remnant (20 November 1846 – 24 February 1941) was an English cricketer. He played 42 first-class matches for Kent County Cricket Club between 1868 and 1878.

Remnant was born at Rochester in 1846.

== Bibliography ==
- Carlaw, Derek (2020). Kent County Cricketers, A to Z: Part One (1806–1914) (PDF). Cardiff: ACS.
