= John Darnall (died 1706) =

Sir John Darnall (died 1706) was an English lawyer.

John Darnall was the son of Ralph Darnall of Loughton's Hope, near Pembridge, Herefordshire, Clerk to the Parliament during the Protectorate. He was assigned in 1680 to argue an exception taken by the Earl of Castlemaine, on his trial for complicity in the Popish Plot, to the evidence of Thomas Dangerfield, on the ground that the witness had been convicted of felony. Lord Chief Justice Scroggs was inclined for a while in favour of the exception, but eventually overruled it.

He also defended a certain John Giles, tried for the murder of a justice of the peace named Arnold in the same year. In 1690 he was assigned by special grace of the court to show cause why one Crone, who had been found guilty of raising money for the service of the late king and sentenced to death, should not be executed. He raised the somewhat technical point that the indictment was bad because the indorsement contained a clerical error, ‘vera’ being spelt ‘verra.’

He was called to the degree of serjeant in 1692, defended Peter Cooke charged with conspiring to assassinate William III in 1696, became king's serjeant in 1698, and was knighted on 1 June 1699. The same year he appeared with the Attorney General, Sir Thomas Trevor, for the Crown on an information brought against Charles Duncombe, cashier of the excise office, for falsely endorsing exchequer bills and paying them into the excise office with intent to defraud the revenue. The case broke down, no fraud being proved. In 1702 he was employed on the prosecution of William Fuller, an imitator of Titus Oates. He was engaged in the prosecution of John Tutchin, the author of the ‘Observator,’ for seditious libel in 1704.

He died at his house in Essex Street, Strand, on 14 December 1706, and was buried in the chancel of St. Clement Danes.

One of his sons was the lawyer Sir John Darnall (died 1735).
