= Heronsford =

Village in South Ayrshire, South-West Scotland

Coordinates: 55.110°N 4.947°W

Heronsford is a village located in South Ayrshire, South-West Scotland.

== About ==
Heronsford is a hamlet located near Ballantrae that sits along the bank of the Water of Tig, a tributary of the River Stinchar.

A single road, the C45, passes through Heronsford, connecting it with the villages of Ballantrae and Colmonell, with a small bridge crossing the Water of Tig known as Heronsford Bridge.

== History ==
The Ayrshire Ordnance Survey Namebook 1855 - 1857 describes Heronsford as "on the Colmonell and Stranraer road and three Miles from the former place

A Small hamlet Consisting of five houses & a Smithy Occupied principally by agricultural labourers. Built of lime & Stone, one Storey high & in good repair". It also mentions the bridge that crosses the Water, describing it as "a Small Stone bridge of one arch Spanning the Water of Tig, in the hamlet of Herringsford & under the Colmonell & Stranraer Road This Bridge is on a Turnpike Road and is consequently a County Bridge."

=== Connection with the Laggan estate ===
Heronsford is on land that was formerly part of the Laggan estate. As such, its history is entwined with that of the estate.

=== World War I ===
There is a War Memorial in Heronsford for the men of the Laggan estate, erected by Marion Hughes-Onslow, who owned Laggan after the death of her husband, Major Denzil Hughes-Onslow, who died on 10 July 1916 at the Somme. The memorial lists the names of six men, including Major Hughes-Onslow, who died during World War I.

=== World War II ===
During World War II, Laggan House was used as a military base working on sonic deception. Families from the base were billeted in Heronsford.

== People from Heronsford ==
The painter and ceramicist Robert Sinclair Thomson lived at Tig Cottage in Heronsford from the mid 1960s until his death in 1983.

His painting of his home, titled "Tig Cottage and the Smiddy", was donated by his wife, Barbara Thomson, to the Royal Scottish Academy of Art in 2010.
