= Stanley Fenley =

English cricketer

Personal information
- Full name: Stanley Fenley
- Born: 4 January 1896; Kingston upon Thames, Surrey, England
- Died: 22 September 1972 (aged 76); Bournemouth, Hampshire, England
- Batting: Right-handed
- Bowling: Leg break

Domestic team information
- Years: Team
- 1924–1929: Surrey
- 1935: Hampshire

Umpiring information
- FC umpired: 1 (1927)

Career statistics
| Competition | First-class |
|---|---|
| Matches | 119 |
| Runs scored | 421 |
| Batting average | 5.84 |
| 100s/50s | –/– |
| Top score | 26 |
| Balls bowled | 21,944 |
| Wickets | 346 |
| Bowling average | 29.09 |
| 5 wickets in innings | 19 |
| 10 wickets in match | 4 |
| Best bowling | 8/69 |
| Catches/stumpings | 52/– |
- Source: Cricinfo, 21 February 2010

Stanley Fenley (4 January 1896 — 2 September 1972) was an English first-class cricketer who played as a leg spinner for both Surrey and Hampshire, making nearly 120 appearances in first-class cricket. He also stood in one first-class match as an umpire.

== Cricket career ==
Fenley was born at Kingston upon Thames in January 1896. Shortly after the conclusion of the First World War, Fenley was commissioned into the 5th (Territorial Force) Battalion, East Surrey Regiment, as a second lieutenant in December 1918. He relinquished his commission in September 1921. After leaving the British Army, he was employed in the Gold Coast in Africa. On leave from his job, Fenley made his debut in first-class cricket as an amateur for Surrey against Glamorgan at Swansea in the 1924 County Championship. He played 22 first-class matches in 1924, finding immediate success as a leg break bowler. He took 84 wickets in his debut season at an average of 19.92, taking seven five wicket hauls. Unusually for an amateur, Fenley turned professional in 1925. Although he could not repeat the success of his first season, he still nonetheless took 62 wickets in 24 matches at an average of 32.14, taking four five wicket hauls. He was earmarked by Jack Hobbs as a future Test cricketer writing for the Weekly Dispatch in August 1925.

Fenley made a further 28 first-class appearances in 1926, taking 89 wickets at an average of 27.59, and once again took four five wicket hauls during the season; Amongst these were his career best figures of 8 for 69 against Glamorgan at The Oval. Thereafter, he featured with less regularity for Surrey, making fifteen appearances in 1927 and nineteen in 1928, taking 40 and 44 wickets respectively, at averages over 30. During the 1927 season, he stood as an umpire in a first-class match between the Royal Navy and the Royal Air Force at The Oval. After featuring in eight first-class matches in May 1929, Fenley was struck down with double pneumonia, and missed the remainder of the season. He had recovered by April 1930, but did not feature again for Surrey. In 116 first-class matches for Surrey, Fenley took 345 wickets at an of 28.70; he took five wickets in an innings on nineteen occasions and took ten-wickets in a match on four occasions.

Fenley was living in Bournemouth by 1932, where he played club cricket for Bournemouth Cricket Club. He reappeared, aged 39, for Hampshire against Nottinghamshire in the 1935 County Championship, deputising for the injured Geoffrey Lowndes. He played a further two matches for Hampshire against Derbyshire and Yorkshire, but took just one wicket in his three matches. Fenley died at Bournemouth in September 1972.
