= Raymond B. Lucas =

American judge (1890–1966)

Raymond B. Lucas (July 26, 1890 – March 21, 1966) was a justice of the Supreme Court of Missouri in 1938.

Born in Lawrence County, Illinois, his family moved to Scott County, Missouri during his childhood, where he attended the public schools. He received a B.A. from the University of Missouri in 1913, and a J.D. from the University of Chicago in 1915. He entered the practice of law that same year in Benton, Missouri.

Lucas was a Democrat and had served as an attorney "for several states and federal agencies", and "as a special judge in the circuit courts of Scott and Mississippi counties".

On September 14, 1938, Governor Lloyd C. Stark appointed Lucas to a seat on the Supreme Court of Missouri vacated by the death of Justice William Francis Frank, for a term expiring on December 31, 1938. Following his service on the court, Lucas served as head of the Missouri Insurance Department for three years.

Lucas moved to Phoenix, Arizona, in 1956, and there served as a receiver for the Maricopa County Superior Court until 1964.

== Personal life ==
On September 19, 1917, Lucas married Cecil Norrid, with whom he had two daughters. A Mason, he received a 50-year pin from that organization in July 1964. Lucas died at a hospital in Phoenix at the age of 75.

Political offices
| Preceded by William Francis Frank | Justice of the Missouri Supreme Court; 1938–1938 | Succeeded by Albert M. Clark |
