= Hendra Croft =

Coordinates: 50.353°N 5.102°W

- Location within Cornwall
- OS grid reference: SW794550
- Civil parish: Perranzabuloe
- Unitary authority: Cornwall
- Ceremonial county: Cornwall
- Region: South West
- Country: England
- Sovereign state: United Kingdom
- Post town: Newquay
- Postcode district: TR8

Hendra Croft is a hamlet in the parish of Perranzabuloe, Cornwall, England.
