= USS Vengeance (1805) =

History

United States
- Name: USS Vengeance
- Launched: 13 June 1805
- Acquired: by purchase, 1805
- Fate: Broken up 1818

General characteristics
- Type: Brig
- Propulsion: Sail
- Armament: 1x13 inch sea service mortar, 2 long nine-pounders

The second USS Vengeance was a brig in the United States Navy during the First Barbary War.

Vengeance was purchased by the United States Navy at Boston, Massachusetts, in 1805 for use as a bomb ketch against the Barbary pirates.

Commanded by Lieutenant William Lewis, she left Boston for the Mediterranean on 18 June and promptly ran aground on flats in the lower harbor, not getting off until the next morning and left harbor. She arrived at Gibraltar on 29 July. She was with Capt. John Rodgers' squadron of 13 warships when it appeared off Tunis on 1 August. Impressed by the American show of force, the Bey of Tunis elected to accept American peace terms, and Vengeance did not see action. She arrived at Charleston, South Carolina 19 July, 1806, then sailed for New York City arriving 4 August. On 20 August ordered to remain read ready to accept a crew, under command of Lt. J. Thorn. Her subsequent movements are unknown, but she was broken up at New York City in 1818.
