= Micajah C. Henley =

American businessman

- Born: June 24, 1856
- Died: June 9, 1927
- Resting place: Earlham Cemetery, Richmond, Indiana
- Known for: Roller skate inventor

Micajah C. Henley (1856–1927) was an American industrialist and inventor. He was a well known manufacturer of roller skates and bicycles sometimes known as "the roller skate king" or "king of roller skates".

He did not invent the roller skate but developed a ball-bearing skate wheel and a toe clamp fastened with a key. He patented his Chicago Skate in 1884, three years after he opened his factory in Richmond, Indiana. The Henley skates were made in Richmond until WWII. The Henley Roller Skate Works could turn out 2,000 pairs of roller skates in one day. He was granted at least two (2 of several held by Henley & Company) U.S. Patents for improvements to the Roller Skate in 1880 and 1881. Henley's Roller Skates were perhaps the best selling Roller Skates of the late 1890s.

== Biography ==
Micajah C. Henley was born on June 24, 1856, in Richmond, Indiana, to a Quaker family. Henley lived at 201 N. 14th Street in Richmond in his parents home. M.C. Henley grew his business operation from a small outbuilding at the rear of his parents' home at 309 N 14th Street, to a large modern factory which he built on North 16th Street, employing over 300 people. Always a competitor, he sponsored many local teams for racing and polo on skates, bicycles, horses, and later automobiles.

The Wright Brothers lived at 211 N. 14th Street, two houses away, for a time. Henley sold Wilbur Wright his first bicycle for $10, which Wilbur borrowed from his brother Orville, and repaid 50 cents per week. Thus the Wright brothers migrated from an interest in kites (which they were manufacturing in their father's carriage house) to bicycles.

=== Henley Roller Skate Works ===
His original goal was to increase sales at his parents' lumber and millwork yard. Plimpton's 1863 patent on skates with 4 wheels was expiring, and Henley, ever the promoter, picked up his father's challenge to "sell more wood". The first skates were all wood, had wooden wheels, and canvas straps. By 1878, Henley had his initial operation running in his father's stable at 309 N 14th Street. His 5 sisters were taught to run his lathe, and were kept busy making wheels. Henley was fascinated with speed, and supported teams of bicycle racers, and also owned race horses. He conceived the idea of wooden floors in every town where local teams could compete in roller skate racing, and several of his patents were aimed at improving cornering. He built his first roller skate rink between North 7th and 8th streets on Saylor Street in Richmond, Indiana, and named it "The Coliseum". After it burned to the ground, it became first a parking lot, and now a small water park. When cleaning trash under spectator benches became a nuisance, he patented the "Coliseum Chair" with a seat that lifts up to make cleaning the floor easier in 1904.

He published a book of rules for roller skate Polo, as well as 16 rules for skating with your sweetheart. With a high quality product and great promotions, the space in the stable was extended 5 times. In 1880 he purchased the house at 201 N 14th Street, and doubled his shop space by including the carriage house there. His nephew suggested using ball bearings in the wheels which they patented in 1884. Product demand went wild; so he built a large two story factory on N 16th Street, which occupied most of a city block, and the Henley Bicycle Works was born. All three buildings are still standing in 2017.

=== Henley Bicycle Works ===
Under the leadership of Henley, the workers at Henley Bicycle Works manufactured bicycles; roller skates; scooters; lawn furniture and lawn swings; iron working machinery; tools; boring, milling and screw driving machines used in wood manufacturing; gas meters; fence machines and lawn mowers. The company also provided nickel plating services.

In 1904, Henley expanded his business to include the automotive industry. He built an auto agency and service garage on Main Street where he commenced selling and servicing vehicles. In 1906, he sold the business (the Auto Inn) and leased the real estate to a firm named of Draper & Whitsell.

=== Death ===
As Henley became notable and wealthy, he started wearing a lot of diamonds. Micajah C. Henley died June 9, 1927. He and his wife, Addie W. (1856–1943) are buried at Earlham Cemetery in Richmond, Indiana.

== Patents ==
M.C. Henley held several U.S. Patents, a partial list is included below, along with reference numbers.

- 234,404 - 11-16-1880 Roller Skate
- 245,950 - 8-23-1881 Roller Skate
- 285,484 - 9-25-1883 Powered Screw Driver
- 319,712 - 6-9-1885 Roller Skate
- 320,352 - 6-16-1885 Roller Skate toe clamp
- 338,736 - 3-30-1886 Improved Roller Skate
- 338,738 - 3-30-1886 Tension Device for making Wire Fencing
- 383,730 - 5-29-1888 Power Drill
- 396,279 - 1-15-1889 Fence Making Machine
- 438,156 - 10-14-1890 Improved Lawn Mower
- 446,448 - 2-17-1891 Pulley Lathe
- 506,398 - 10-10-1893 5 Speed Transmission (to change Lathe Rotation Speed)
- 518,670 - 4-24-1894 Improved Lawn Mower
- 518,995 - 5-1-1894 Boiler Tube Cleaner
- 755,133 - 3-22-1904 Coliseum Chair (theater seat)
