= William Hendley (priest) =

Church of England priest and controversialist (1691–1724)

William Hendley (1691–1724) was a Church of England clergyman of controversial views who strongly advocated charity schools to provide free education for disadvantaged children.

== Origins ==
Baptised at Bearsted in Kent on 11 April 1691 into the Hendley family of landowners, he was the son of William Hendley (1657-1724) and his first wife Elizabeth (died 1697). His father was a younger son of John Hendley (1617-1676) and his wife Priscilla Fludd (1627-1684).

== Career ==
In 1708 he was admitted to Pembroke Hall at Cambridge, where he gained a BA. Ordained a deacon at Ely in 1712, he was later ordained a priest in London in 1715. The next year he was appointed lecturer of St James, Clerkenwell and from there took part in the Bangorian controversy, criticising Benjamin Hoadly, Bishop of Bangor, in 1717 for allegedly destroying the authority of the Church of England and of its clergy. In 1718 he was elected to the lectureship of St Mary's Church, Islington and was also appointed chaplain to Charles Mildmay, Baron FitzWalter.

On 24 August 1718 he conducted a service in the parish church of Chislehurst in Kent at which he preached a sermon advocating charity schools and announced that the collection would be in aid of the charity school of St Anne and St Agnes in London. As trustees of the school went round gathering donations, proceedings were interrupted by Thomas Farrington, a local justice of the peace, who claimed that the collection was illegal, that the children were just vagrants, and that the money was really to support the Stuart cause after the recent failure of the Jacobite rising of 1715. When Hendley refused to stop, people gave even more generously and after the service he took the money for safekeeping to Francis Atterbury, the Bishop of Rochester. Later that day he was arrested, together with the rector of Chislehurst and three of the trustees, and at a hearing that evening in Maidstone the five men were bound over for trial. On 15 July 1719 they were tried at Rochester, with Sir John Darnall appearing for the Crown and Sir John Comyns defending, and were convicted of sedition and unlawful gains, being sentenced to a fine of six shillings and eight pence each (equivalent to about 60 pounds in 2022). He wrote a pamphlet about these events, arguing even more strongly for charity schools and defended them further in a (posthumous) pamphlet against Bernard Mandeville.

Aged only 33, he was buried at St Mary's on 4 October 1724 and his will was proved the next day.

== Family ==
After an unrecorded first marriage, on 29 June 1723 he entered into a bond to marry at St Mary's Bethiah Honeycott (born about 1700). She was the daughter of the Reverend John Honeycott, master of the charity school of St James, Clerkenwell. They had a daughter, Mary Hendley.

== Writings ==
- A defence of the Church of England ... in opposition to Popery and Presbytery. A sermon [on Acts xxiv. 14] preach'd Dec. 16, 1714. London, 1715.
- St. Paul's charge to Timothy; or, the Pastor's duty. Two sermons [on 2 Tim. iv. 2, 3 and on 1 Tim. vi. 20]. London, 1716.
- An Appeal to the consciences and common sense of the Christian Laity, whether the Bishop of Bangor in his Preservative, etc., hath not given up the rights of the Church, and the powers of the Christian Priesthood. London, 1719.
- Charity still a Christian virtue: or, an impartial account of the tryal and conviction of the Reverend Mr. Hendley, for preaching a charity-sermon at Chisselhurst. And of Mr. Chapman, Mr. Prat, Mr. Harding, for collecting at the same time alms of the congregation. At the assizes held at Rochester, on Wednesday, July 15. 1719. Offer'd to the consideration of the clergy of the Church of England. London, 1719. (As late as 2008, this work was being incorrectly attributed to Daniel Defoe).
- Loimologia Sacra; or, a discourse shewing that the Plague ... is sent immediately from God ... as a punishment to a people for their sins. With ... an appendix, wherein the case of flying from a pestilence is briefly consider'd., London 1721.
- The great blessedness of Communicating, being an earnest exhortation to the Holy Communion. ... With a brief explanation of the nature of the Lord's Supper ... Second edition enlarged. London, 1723.
- A defence of the Charity-Schools. Wherein the many ... objections of ... the Author of the Fable of the Bees [B. de Mandeville] and Cato's Letter in the British Journal ... are ... answer'd. ... To which is added ... the Presentment of the Grand Jury of the British Journal. London, 1725.
