= Henley, Oregon =

Unincorporated community in the state of Oregon, United States

- Unincorporated community
- Location within Oregon and the United States Henley (the United States)
- Coordinates: 42°09′08″N 121°41′56″W
- Country: United States
- State: Oregon
- County: Klamath
- Elevation: 4,098 ft (1,249 m)
- Time zone: UTC-8 (Pacific (PST))
  - Summer (DST): UTC-7 (PDT)
- GNIS feature ID: 1136371

Henley is an unincorporated community in Klamath County, Oregon, United States. It is approximately 4 miles (6 km) southeast of Klamath Falls along Oregon Route 39.

The community is named after James T. Henley, who settled here in 1887 and operated a large ranch. He died in 1901.

Henley High School, Henley Middle School, and Henley Elementary are in Henley. All are part of the Klamath County School District.
