= Skye Museum of Island Life =

Museum in Kilmuir, Skye, Scotland

Coordinates: 57°39′36″N 6°22′8″W

The Skye Museum of Island Life is a museum in Kilmuir, Skye, Scotland, which is dedicated to preserving a township of thatched cottages as they would have been on Skye at the end of the 18th century.

== Pictures of the museum ==
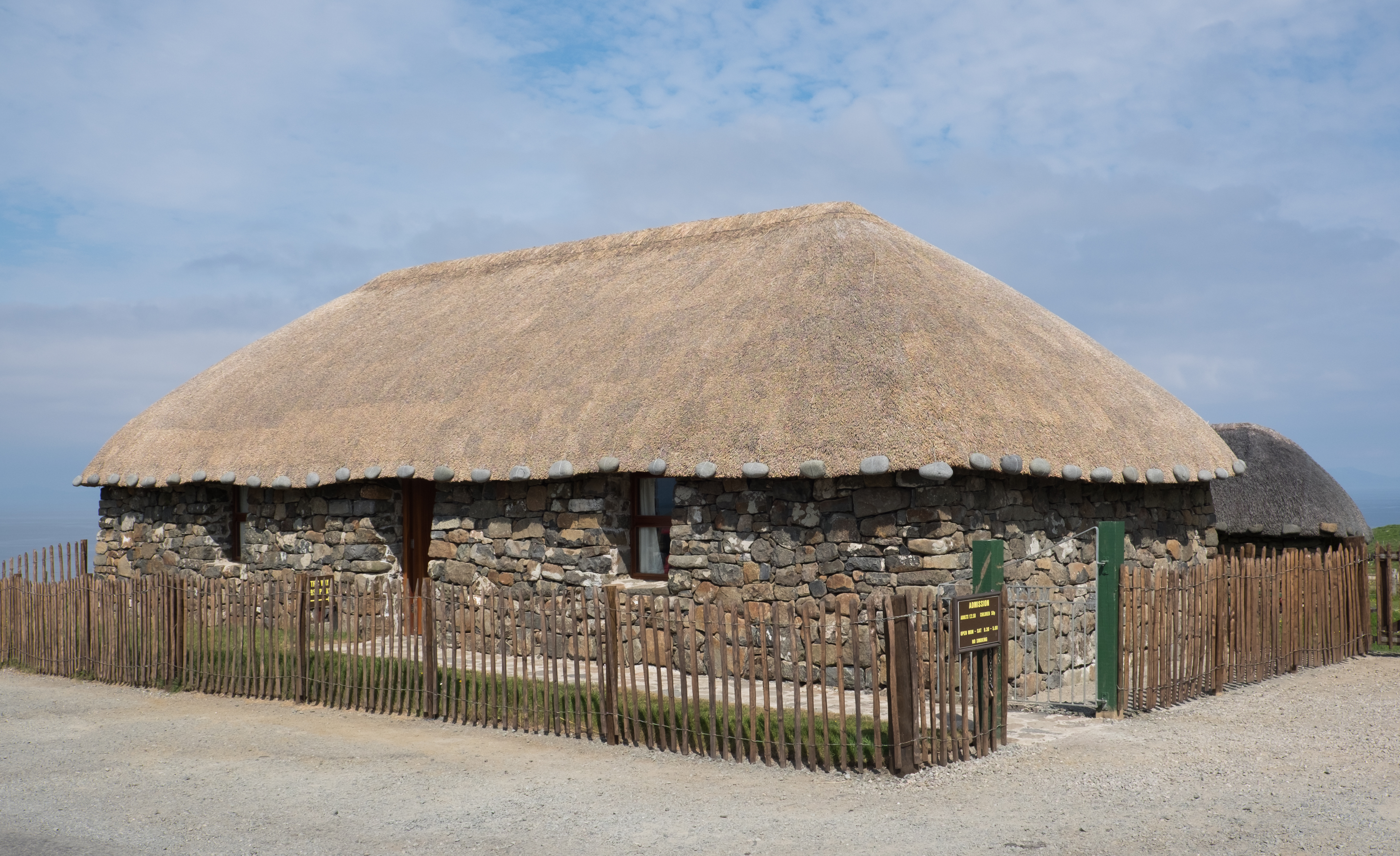
The visitor reception in 2016

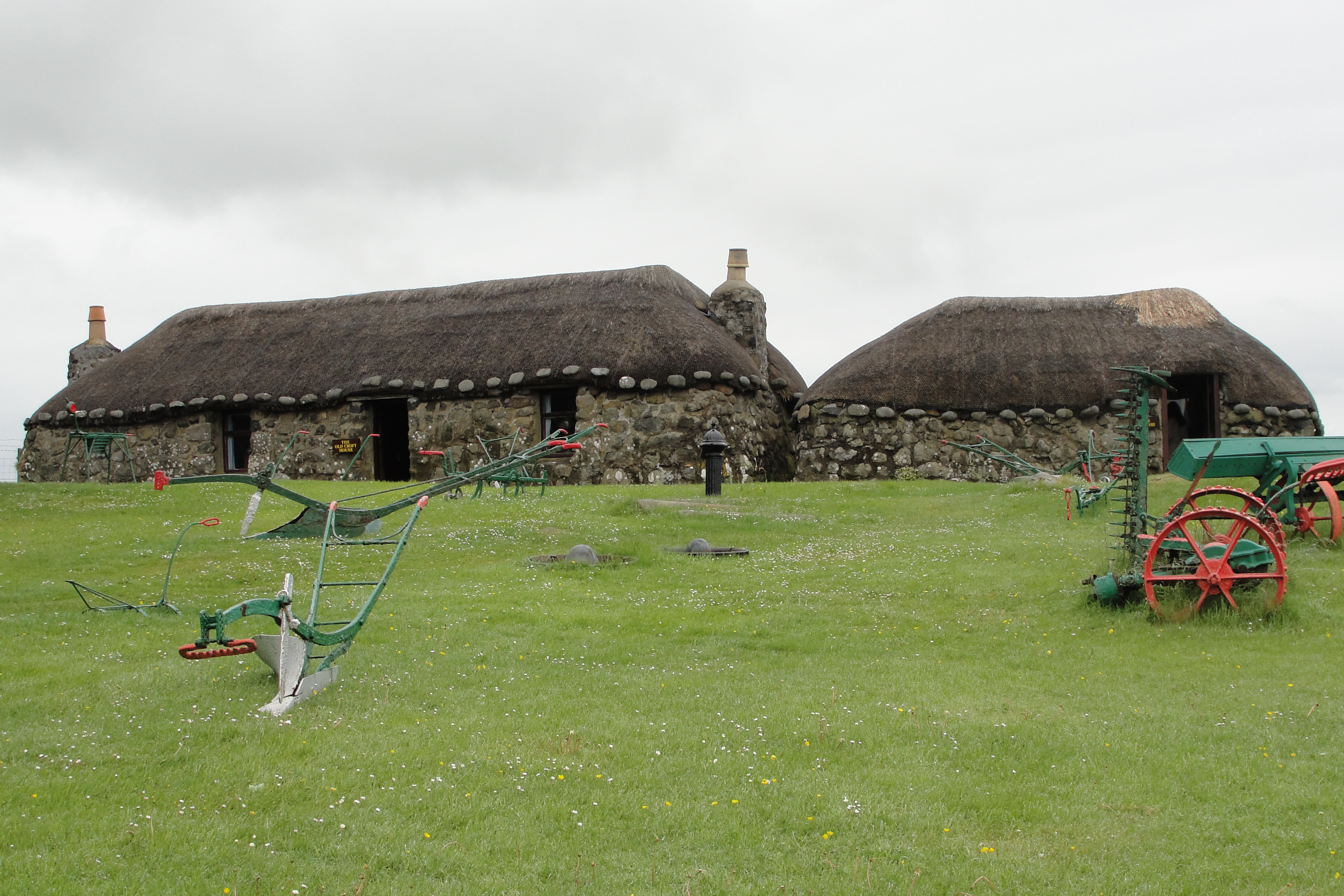
Two of the cottages in 2013

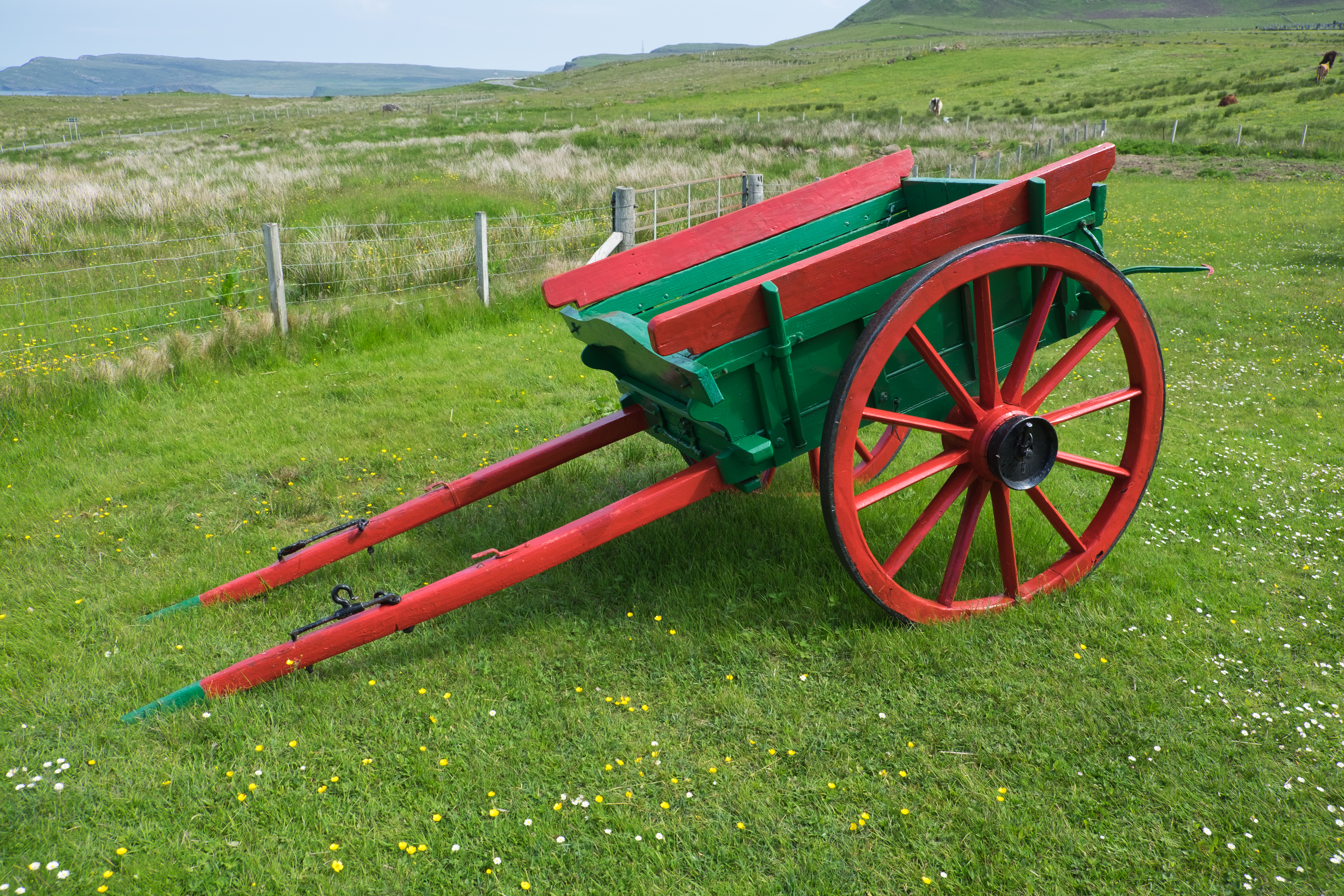
A two-wheeled horse-drawn farm cart on display
