= Walter Hendley =

Walter Hendley may refer to:

- Walter Hendley of the Hendley Baronets
- Walter Hendley (MP), MP for Canterbury
