= Hersham, Cornwall =

Hamlet in Cornwall, England

Coordinates: 50°50′35″N 4°28′30″W

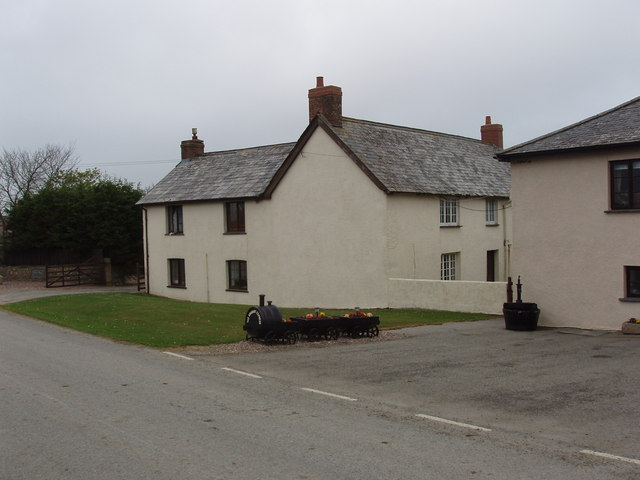
Moreton Pound Farm

Hersham is a hamlet south of Kilkhampton in Cornwall, England. Hersham is near Grimscott. It is in the civil parish of Launcells.
