= Hendreforgan =

Village in Rhondda Cynon Taf, Wales

- Village
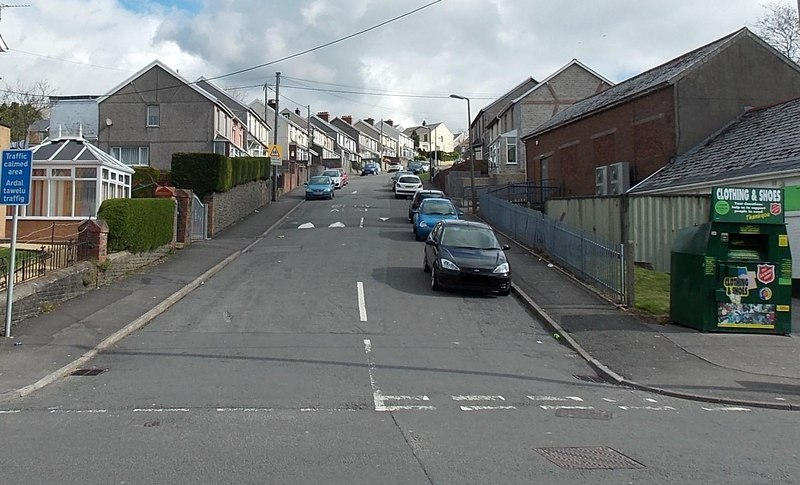
- Fern Street, Hendreforgan

- Location within Rhondda Cynon Taf
- Population: 2,444
- OS grid reference: SS 985 884
- Community: Gilfach Goch
- Principal area: Rhondda Cynon Taf
- Preserved county: Mid Glamorgan
- Country: Wales
- Sovereign state: United Kingdom
- Post town: Porth
- Postcode district: CF39
- Dialling code: 01443
- Police: South Wales
- Fire: South Wales
- Ambulance: Welsh
- UK Parliament: Rhondda and Ogmore
- Senedd Cymru – Welsh Parliament: Afan Ogwr Rhondda
- List of places UK Wales Rhondda Cynon Taf 51.5837°N 3.4701°W Map of the community

Hendreforgan is a village in the community of Gilfach Goch, in the county borough of Rhondda Cynon Taf, Wales, with a recorded population of 2,444 in a 2021 census. It is situated on the southern most edge of the Gilfach Goch Valley and sits directly on the head of the Cwm Elái (Ely Valley). The village sits 3 miles south-west of Tonypandy and 2.5 miles west of Tonyrefail. The Nant Ogwr Fach, a small tributary stream to the Afon Ogwr passes through the nearby area.

== Etymology ==
The village's name originates from the Welsh word 'Hendre' meaning 'Old home' likely referring to an ancestral home and the personal name 'Morgan' which softly mutates into 'Forgan' thus meaning the name Hendreforgan translates to, 'The old home of Morgan' or 'Morgan's old home'.

== Hendreforgan Colliery ==
Hendreforgan Colliery, also known as Cox's, was first opened in 1814, being leased to John and George Evans of Llansamlet, as part of a 99 year lease deal, though James Cox would take over for George Evans in 1816. It was used to mine anthracite coal.

The mine would use steam engines from as early as 1818, including a stationary underground one made by George Stephenson sometime before 1840. It was also using steam jet ventilation by as early as 1828. In 1832 the mine was quoted as producing 120 tons of coal per day; however, post-1832 output increased drastically, peaking at 35,790 tons of coal per day in 1889.

On 11 November 1869, an explosion in the colliery killed six colliers. After an investigation, the cause was identified as inadequate ventilation after a change a few days prior, leading to an open flame from a lamp igniting the built-up gas in the mine. A jury ruled the deaths accidental, and the owner was severely reprimanded for allowing an incompetent person to manage the mine; an inspector commented that they had "never met with a case where less knowledge of mining was brought to bear".

The colliery would decrease its output to 10,000 tons of coal per day by 1894. In 1896, the colliery had 489 workers; however, the amount of workers would steeply decline after this, being less than 300 by 1899, and less than 200 in 1903. By 1908, it only employed 33 workers. It would close around 1924.

== See also ==
- Gilfach Goch
- Afon Ogwr
