= Hendrabridge =

Coordinates: 50.464°N 4.446°W

- Location within Cornwall
- OS grid reference: SX265656
- Civil parish: Menheniot
- Unitary authority: Cornwall
- Ceremonial county: Cornwall
- Region: South West
- Country: England
- Sovereign state: United Kingdom
- Post town: Liskeard
- Postcode district: PL14 6

Hendrabridge is a hamlet in the parish of Menheniot, Cornwall, England. It is in the civil parish of Dobwalls and Trewidland.
