= John Darnall (died 1735) =

Sir John Darnall (c. 1672 – 5 September 1735) was an English lawyer.

== Biography ==
The son of the lawyer Sir John Darnall (died 1706), Darnall the younger defended in 1710 Dammaree, Willis, and Purchase, the ringleaders in a riot in the neighbourhood of Lincoln's Inn Fields, when some meeting-houses were wrecked by way of showing sympathy with Sacheverell. The indictment was laid for high treason, and Dammaree was found guilty and sentenced, but ultimately pardoned.

In 1714 Darnall was called to the degree of serjeant-at-law, and knighted in 1724. In 1717 his opinion was taken on the question whether the King was entitled to the custody of his grandchildren. Darnall advised ‘that by the law of England every subject hath a right to the custody of his own children,’ and that he knew of ‘no distinction in the case of the royal family.’ In 1719 he appeared for the crown in the case of the Reverend William Hendley, indicted at Rochester for obtaining money for the use of the Pretender under pretence of charity.

In 1724 he was appointed steward of the palace court, commonly known as the Marshalsea. In the case of Major Oneby, indicted at the Old Bailey in 1726 for the murder of one Gower, whom he had killed in a rencounter in a tavern in Drury Lane, the jury returned a special verdict. The question was whether the facts amounted to murder or rested in manslaughter. Darnall argued the point before the Court of King's Bench. Oneby, being convicted of murder, committed suicide by opening a vein on the night before the day appointed for the execution. Darnall successfully defended in 1730 Thomas Bambridge, late warden of the Fleet Prison, on his trial for the murder of a prisoner. In 1733 he was placed on a commission appointed to inquire into the fees charged in the courts of justice. He died in September 1735, aged 63.

Darnall married Margaret, daughter of Sir Thomas Jenner. He had a magnificent house at Petersham, Surrey.
