= Hendley =

Hendley is both an English surname and a given name. Notable people with the name include:

Surname:

- Bob Hendley (born 1939), American baseball player
- Charles J. Hendley (1881–1962), American teacher and union leader
- Daisy Hendley (1893–1975), American journalist and author
- Fiona Hendley (born 1939), British actress and Christian speaker
- Walter Hendley (disambiguation)

Given name:

- Hendley S. Bennett (1807–1891), American politician

== See also ==
- Hendley, Nebraska, village in Nebraska, United States
