= Henle =

Henle can refer to:

- Friedrich Gustav Jakob Henle, a German physician, pathologist and anatomist (1809–1885)
  - Loop of Henle in the kidney, named after Henle
- Fritz Henle, a photographer, known as "Mr. Rollei" for his use of the 2.25" square format film used in the Rolleiflex camera
- Günter Henle, German politician and music publisher
  - G. Henle Verlag, German music publishing house
- Moritz Henle, a German composer
- Paul Henle (1949–2018), American politician
- Robert A. Henle, an American electrical engineer
- Robert J. Henle, the 46th President of Georgetown University
