= Hennelly =

Hennelly is a surname common to County Mayo in Ireland. English language form of Gaeilge Ó hIonnghaile. Variant of Ó Fionnghaile of the personal name Fionnghal, which gave rise to Fennelly. The English translation of Fionghal is "white shoulder" meaning Norseman or Viking.

== Origin ==
The origin of the name stems from the owners of the Galway side mill on the Black River (River bordering Mayo and Galway) at Ower. One son inherited the mill while the other, angry that he did not, built his own mill on the opposite side of the river in county Mayo. He then replaced the "F" in the family surname(Fennelly) with an "H" changing the name to Hennelly. Lending credence to this family legend is reference in Metaphor's History of Shrule parish to the presence of two operating Mills on the Black River at Ower during the famine and the fact that there still exists the remnants of a mill on the Mayo side of the Black River at Ower Bridge where Hennellys resided for many generations the last Hennelly residents passing in the 1970s.

== People ==
- Denis Henry Hennelly, co-producer of the film Beef (documentary) and director of Bold Native
- Kevin Hennelly, American screenwriter in The Mad (film)
