= Hensley =

Hensley may refer to:

People with the surname:

- Hensley (surname)

People with the first name:

- Hensley Hancuff (born 2000), American soccer player, female goalkeeper
- Hensley Henson (1863–1947), English bishop
- Hensley Koeiman (born 1956), Curaçaoan politician
- Hensley Meulens (born 1967), Dutch baseball player
- Hensley Anthony Neville (1957–1992), Singaporean convicted murderer
- Hensley Paulina (born 1993), Dutch sprinter
- Hensley Sapenter (born 1939), American football player

Companies with the name:

- Hensley & Co., a beer distributor in Arizona

In places:

- Hensley, Arkansas

Other:

- Hensley-Gusman House
