= William Henley =

William Henley may refer to:

- William Cumming Henley (1860–1919), British artist, naturalist and botanist, and scientific microscopist
- William Ernest Henley (1849–1903), British poet, critic and author
- William Thomas Henley (1814–1882), British telegraph engineer and pioneer submarine cable manufacturer
- William Henley (violinist) (1882–1957), English violinist and composer
