= Henleys =

Men's and womenswear brand based in Manchester

Thornton Henleys Clothing Ltd
- Company type: Private
- Industry: Clothing
- Founded: 1996; 30 years ago
- Headquarters: Manchester

Henleys was a men's and womenswear brand based in Manchester, United Kingdom.

== Company history ==
Henleys was established in 1996 by Ben Luscombe, and Simon Peters became a partner in 2000. It is a private limited company (Henleys Clothing Limited). Starting out as a men's shirt brand, the Henleys range branched out into casual wear in the late 1990s, followed by a ladies' range in 2002.

Henleys was placed 76th in the Sunday Times Fast Track Top 100 companies in 2009, with an annual sales growth of 63%.

Henley's went into Administration in 2011.

== Products ==
- Shoes
- Tracksuit Bottoms
- Jeans
- Men's Shirts
- T-shirts
