= Henley High School =

Henley High School may refer to:

- Henley High School (Australia)
- Henley High School (Oregon)
