= John D. Henley =

United States Navy officer (1781–1835)

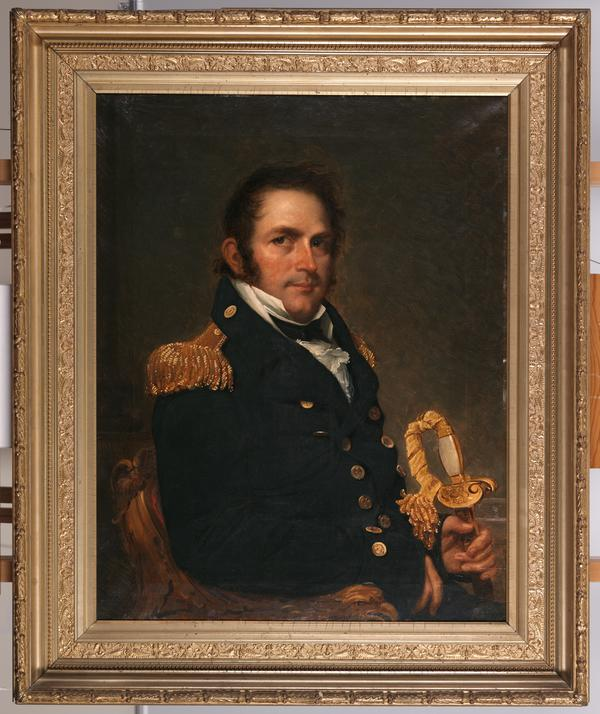
- portrait by John Wesley Jarvis
- Born: February 25, 1781; Williamsburg
- Died: May 23, 1835; Havana
- Mother: Elizabeth Dandridge Aylett Henley
- Relatives: Robert Henley

Captain John Dandridge Henley (February 25, 1781 – May 23, 1835) was an officer of the United States Navy who served in the First Barbary War and the War of 1812.

== Early life ==
Henley was born February 25, 1781 at Williamsburg, Virginia, the son of Leonard Henley and Elizabeth Dandridge (b. 1749) and the nephew of Martha Dandridge Custis Washington, the wife of George Washington. His younger brother was Robert Henley (1783–1828), also a naval officer.

== Career ==
On October 14, 1799, at the age of 18, he was commissioned Midshipman by his uncle, George Washington. During offensive operations against Tripoli in 1804, he served in Gunboat No. 6, commanded by Lieutenant John Trippe. In a stirring attack August 3 against a larger enemy warship, the two officers with only nine other men boarded and took the enemy ship in hand-to-hand fighting, although outnumbered three to one. Midshipman Henley also took part in several other attacks in the months that followed as Commodore Edward Preble's squadron carried out aggressive and successful operations against the Tripolitan pirates that made them ready to end their aggression.

Later in his career, during the War of 1812, Henley commanded schooner Carolina during the Battle of New Orleans. After the gallant delaying action by Lt. Thomas ap Catesby Jones at Lake Borgne, Carolina and other ships harassed the British with naval gunfire by protecting General Andrew Jackson's flank on the Mississippi River. Though his ship was destroyed, Henley contributed importantly to the large role the small flotilla played in this last great victory of the war.

On March 5, 1817, he rose to the rank of captain. Early in 1819 Henley commanded U.S. man-of war Congress to China, the first U.S. warship to visit that country. He continued to serve with distinction until May 23, 1835 when he died on board Vandalia at Havana, Cuba.

== Personal life ==
On March 31, 1816, he married Elizabeth Denison (1788–1838), the daughter of Gideon Denison (1752–1799), an attorney from Hartford, Connecticut. Together, they had three daughters:

- Frances Henley (1818–1873), who married Rev. Edward Y. Higbie (1800–1871), an Episcopal clergyman.
- Henrietta Elizabeth Henley, who married Jonathan Bayard Harrison Smith (1810–1889), a Washington D.C. lawyer, the son of Samuel Harrison Smith and Margaret Bayard, in 1842.
- Eliza Henley (b. 1828), who married Admiral Stephen Bleecker Luce (1827–1917).

=== Descendants ===
Through his second daughter, he was the grandfather of John Henley Smith (c. 1844–1907), who married Rebecca Young, Samuel Harrison Smith, who married Alive Hall, and Bayard Thornton Smith (b. 1857), who married Eleanor J. Hyde (the daughter of George Hyde, an early settler and the Alcalde of San Francisco) in 1882.

Through his youngest daughter, he was the grandfather of Caroline Luce (1857-1933), was the wife of Montgomery M. Macomb (1852–1924), a brigadier general in the United States Army.

=== Lecgacy ===
The destroyer USS John D. Henley (DD-553) was named in his honor. See USS Henley for other ships named after John D. Henley and his brother, Robert Henley.

== See also ==
- USS Henley
- USS John D. Henley (DD-553)
