= Henley Business School South Africa =

Campus of the British-based Henley Business School

Henley Business School Africa
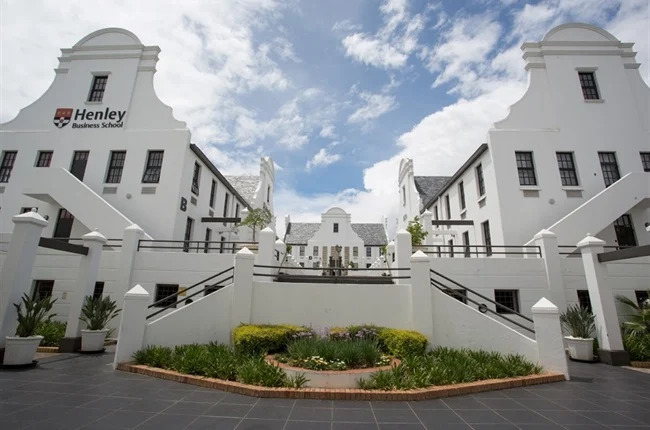
- Henley Africa Campus, 1 Witkoppen Rd, Paulshof, Johannesburg, 2191
- Type: Business school
- Established: 1992
- Accreditation: Association of MBAs, Equis, South African Business Schools Association, Association to Advance Collegiate Schools of Business
- Affiliations: Henley Business School
- Dean: Jonathan Foster-Pedley
- Location: Johannesburg, Gauteng, South Africa; 26°2′14.96″S 28°3′23.16″E
- Campus: Urban
- Website: Henleysa.ac.za
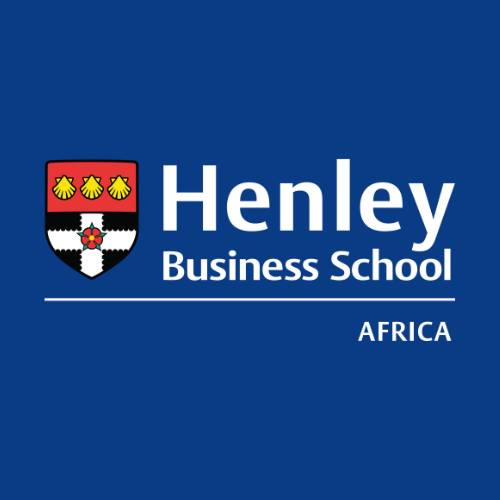

Henley Business School, Africa (formerly Henley Management College, South Africa), in the Paulshof suburb of Johannesburg, is a branch of the British-based Henley Business School, part of the University of Reading and one of the oldest business schools in Europe with operations in 17 countries across the globe. The African institution, which is locally accredited and has offered the MBA in South Africa since 1992, shares international accreditation with its parent school and is also locally accredited in South Africa. The South African campus has offered the MBA in South Africa since 1992. In 2002, the South African location became a fully owned subsidiary of its British parent. As the operation in South Africa is the only Henley Business School on the African continent, it has students living in neighbouring countries studying and being supported through this office. Henley Africa has one primary South African campus, Paulshof suburb of Johannesburg, and services students living in South Africa and neighbouring countries.

== History and growth in Africa ==
In 1992 Henley Business School introduced its MBA Degree to the South African market, under license to the Graduate Institute of Management Technology (GIMT) and the first 18 MBA students graduated in 1995. When GIMT was sold, Henley UK bought back the license, the South African operation became a branch office and, in 2002, launched itself as a fully integrated school of Henley in South Africa. In 2008 Henley Management College merged with the University of Reading to form Henley Business School, one of the world’s largest full-service business schools.

In 2007, Henley established its social entrepreneurship arm. This was followed in 2011 by the introduction of Henley MBAid, an initiative whereby students, as part of their learning, provide expertise and support to NGOs.

In 2012, Henley Business School Africa celebrated its 20th anniversary and the opening of its current premises in Paulshof, Sandton.

== Academics ==
Henley Africa’s internationally recognised Executive MBA, accredited in the UK and South Africa, is offered in South Africa in two formats: The Flexible Executive MBA and the Global Executive MBA.The Flexible Executive MBA targets experienced, practising managers seeking to enhance their leadership skills or prepare for a senior or executive management position. The degree is presented in South Africa as a flexible, family-friendly, 30-month, part-time programme delivered by way of a blend of face-to-face workshops, team assignments, on-line and off-line study, individual and group self-study methods. African students pay just 50% of the price for the same UK qualification if studied in the UK.

Henley’s Flexible Executive MBA attracts students from numerous African countries, including Zimbabwe, Nigeria, Kenya, Mozambique and Ghana, it has also proved popular with students from creative industries, especially artists and creatives who want to develop their business skills. Graduates of the programme include South African musicians Loyiso Bala, Barry van Zyl and Andy Innes.

In 2024, the school introduced its flagship Global Executive MBA into South Africa. Built on the same core offering of the Flexible Executive MBA, the Global Executive MBA is offered over 24 months for high-touch, fast-track learning and includes five international study visits and immersions in strategic global locations along with individualised executive coaching. Students registered in South Africa benefit from being taught by Henley Business School’s specialist international faculty, who bring their industry knowledge and passion to the learning environment. Priced for affordability in the African context, Henley’s Global Executive MBA is offered at 70% of the price of the same UK qualification if studied in the UK.

In addition to Henley’s EMBA programmes, the school offers a full suite of accredited programmes at undergraduate and postgraduate level, as well as short courses designed for working South Africans and spanning key management-related areas essential for running sustainable organisations. Programmes include:

Undergraduate Programmes:

- Work Readiness Programme (NQF 5)
- Higher Certificate in Management Practice (NQF 5)
- Advanced Certificate in Management Practice (NQF 6)
- Advanced Diploma in Management Practice (NQF 7)

Postgraduate Programmes:

- Postgraduate Diploma in Management Practice (NQF 8)
- The Henley Master of Business Administration MBA (NQF 9)
- Global MBA (NQF 9)
- Doctor of Business Administration DBA (NQF 10)

Short Courses:

- High Impact Communication
- Finance for Non-financial Managers
- Personal Mastery
- Strategic Sales Leadership
- Innovation and Design Thinking
- AI and Data-Driven Leadership: Navigating Digital Transformation
- Cybersecurity Leadership Essentials
- Future-proof your Healthcare Practice
- Elevating Aviation Leadership
- From Stage to Strategy: Applying Dramatic Principles to Business Innovation
- The Strategy Programme
- NextGen Project Management

In addition, Henley consults with a range of leading global organisations to provide customised executive and tailored qualification programmes.

Executive Education

Henley is the highest ranked, locally accredited business school in southern Africa for executive education (FT 2023 & 2024) and the only business school in South Africa to offer a full suite of accredited management practice qualifications from NQF levels 5 to 8, up to 50% of which can be customised to an organisation’s specific needs.

== Accreditation ==
Henley is the only international business school in Africa accredited by all three major international accreditation bodies: the European Foundation for Management Development, which awards the European Quality Improvement System (EQUIS), the Association to Advance Collegiate Schools of Business (AACSB) and the Association of MBAs (AMBA). It is also one of the first business schools in Africa to be accredited by the Association of African Business Schools (AABS), making it the first to be quadruple accredited.

== Rankings ==
Notable recent rankings include: Financial Times Global Rankings

- Executive MBA: 40 (2023) 52 (2024)
- Executive Education Custom programmes: 25 (2023); 29 (2024)
- Executive Education Open programmes: 21 (2023); 23 (2024)
- Executive MBA: 8 (2024)

PMR.Africa South African Ranking

- Number one in South Africa (2018,2019,2020, 2021, 2022, 2023, 2024, 2025)

== Campus & facilities ==
Henley Business School Africa is located in the Sandton suburb of Paulshof, close to the N1 Western Bypass and 10 km from Sandton City. It provides a variety of facilities for workshops, learning events, coaching sessions, conferences, board meetings, strategy sessions, team meetings, courses and seminars.
