= Fred L. Henley =

American judge

Chief Justice of the Supreme Court of Missouri
- In office July 1, 1969 – June 30, 1971
- Preceded by: Lawrence Holman
- Succeeded by: James A. Finch, Jr.

Judge of the Supreme Court of Missouri
- In office May 28, 1964 – 1978
- Appointed by: John M. Dalton
- Preceded by: Frank Hollingsworth

Personal details
- Born: October 25, 1911 Caruthersville, Missouri
- Died: December 31, 1994 (aged 83) Jefferson City, Missouri
- Spouse: Bernice Chilton
- Education: Cumberland University

Fred L. Henley (October 25, 1911 – December 31, 1994) was a judge on the Missouri Supreme Court from 1964 until 1978, and the chief justice of that same court from 1969 to 1971.

Henley was appointed to the court by Governor John M. Dalton, to a seat vacated by the death of Justice Frank Hollingsworth. Prior to his appointment, he was the chairman of the state highway commission.
