= Anthony Henley (cricketer) =

English cricketer

Personal information
- Full name: Anthony Alfred Henley
- Born: 7 November 1846; Sherborne, Dorset, England
- Died: 14 December 1916 (aged 70); Woodbridge, Suffolk, England
- Role: Wicket-keeper
- Relatives: Francis Henley (son); Robert Henley (brother)

Domestic team information
- Years: Team
- 1866: Hampshire

Career statistics
Competition	First-class
Matches	1
Runs scored	16
Batting average	8.00
100s/50s	0/0
Top score	9
Catches/stumpings	0/–
- Source: Cricinfo, 9 January 2010

Anthony Alfred Henley (7 November 1846 – 14 December 1916) was an English cricketer and medical doctor.

The son of Cornish Henley, he was born at Sherborne in November 1846. He was educated there at Sherborne School, where he played for and captained the school cricket team. He played first-class cricket for Hampshire in 1866, making a single appearance against Surrey at The Oval. Playing as a wicket-keeper in the match, he batted twice and was dismissed for 7 runs by George Griffith in Hampshire's first innings, while in their second innings he was dismissed by Thomas Humphrey for 9 runs. Henley was by profession a doctor and was resident at Woodbridge in Suffolk until his death there in December 1916. His son, Francis, was also a first-class cricketer, as was his brother Robert.
