= Francis Henley =

English cricketer

Francis Anthony Hoste Henley (11 February 1884 – 26 June 1963) was an English first-class cricketer active 1903–08 who played for Middlesex and Oxford University. He was a son of Anthony Henley, who played cricket for Hampshire.

Henley was born on 11 February 1884 in Woodbridge, Suffolk, and was educated at Oriel College, Oxford. He was a son of Anthony Henley, who played cricket for Hampshire. During World War I he was an officer in the Army Service Corps. In 1924 he wrote The Boys' Book of Cricket. He died on 26 June 1963 in Wheathampstead, aged 79 years old .
