= USS John D. Henley =

Fletcher-class destroyer

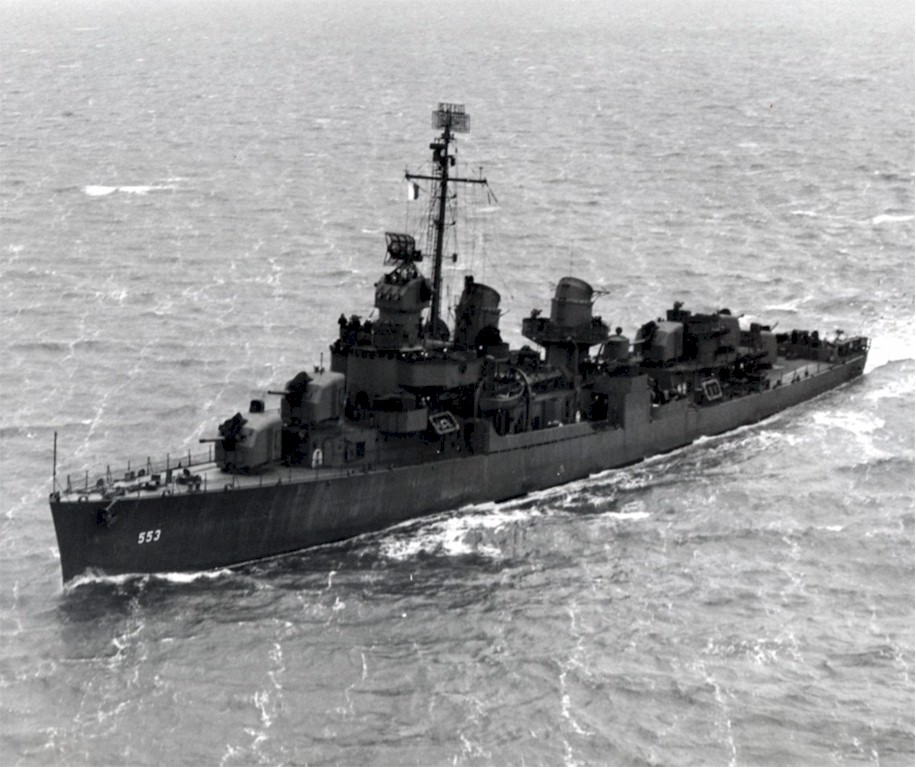
- USS John D. Henley (DD-553) underway in 1944

History

United States
- Namesake: John D. Henley
- Builder: Gulf Shipbuilding Corporation, Chickasaw, Alabama
- Laid down: 21 July 1941
- Launched: 15 November 1942
- Commissioned: 2 February 1944
- Decommissioned: 30 April 1946
- Stricken: 1 May 1968
- Fate: Sold May 1970, and scrapped

General characteristics
- Class & type: Fletcher-class destroyer
- Displacement: 2,050 tons
- Length: 376 ft 6 in (114.7 m)
- Beam: 39 ft 8 in (12.1 m)
- Draft: 17 ft 9 in (5.4 m)
- Propulsion: 60,000 shp (45 MW); 2 propellers
- Speed: 35 knots (65 km/h; 40 mph)
- Range: 6,500 nm @ 15 kn (12,000 km @ 28 km/h)
- Complement: 273
- Armament: 5 × single Mk 12 5 in (127 mm)/38 guns; 5 × twin 40 mm (1.6 in) Bofors AA guns; 7 × single 20 mm (0.8 in) Oerlikon AA guns; 2 × quintuple 21 in (533 mm) torpedo tubes; 6 × single depth charge throwers; 2 × depth charge racks

USS John D. Henley (DD-553), a Fletcher-class destroyer, was a ship of the United States Navy named for Captain John D. Henley (1781–1835).

John D. Henley was laid down on 21 July 1941 by Gulf Shipbuilding Corporation, Chickasaw, Ala.; launched on 15 November 1942, sponsored by Miss Shelah Keith Kane, great-great-great-granddaughter of Captain Henley; and commissioned on 2 February 1944.

== Service history ==
Following exhaustive shakedown training out of Bermuda, the new destroyer arrived Norfolk on 28 March 1944. Sailing for the Pacific via the Panama Canal, she arrived Pearl Harbor on 23 April 1944. After operational training, John D. Henley escorted fleet oilers to Majuro and returned on 17 May. She departed on 27 May for Majuro once more and there became flagship of a refueling task group. Departing on 6 June 1944, the ships moved to the Marianas to refuel the fleet during the capture and occupation of Saipan and Tinian. During this long at-sea period the ships came under air attack 17–18 June. They returned to Eniwetok 14 August.

As the Navy's mobile amphibious forces prepared to move into the Palaus, Henley joined Task Group 30.8 (TG 30.8) and departed Manus 1 September as flagship of the refueling group during strikes on Peleliu and its eventual capture. The oilers and their escorts continued to operate out of Ulithi well into November, supporting the vast aircraft carrier task forces striking the Philippines. This unit, headed by Captain J. T. Acuff, had much to do with the great success of the wide-ranging carrier forces.

In December, the destroyer moved to Guam for independent operation as an escort and patrol ship in the Marshall and Mariana Islands. She then steamed to Ulithi, where she arrived 31 January 1945 to undergo operational training in covering Underwater Demolition Teams. She sailed 14 February for the next major landing on the island road to Japan, Iwo Jima. Arriving 2 days later, she took part in the pre-invasion bombardment and, after the assault on Iwo Jima 19 February, performed yeoman fire support, screening, and radar picket duties during the bitter fighting ashore. She returned to Ulithi on 5 March to prepare for the Okinawa invasion.

Henley got underway on 21 March for the last and largest of the Pacific amphibious operations, Okinawa. Her assignment consisted of screening the light carriers as their planes provided vital air support to ground troops. Undergoing periodic air attacks, she continued to screen her carrier group, with occasional logistics stops at Kerama Retto until 24 June. She arrived Leyte Gulf 27 June 1945.

The veteran ship returned to waters north of Okinawa on 1 July to cover minesweeping operations. Henley returned to Buckner Bay on 7 August and was there at war's end on 15 August. She took air-sea rescue station off Japan on 24 August, then departed on 2 September, the day of Japan's formal surrender, for the long voyage to California, arriving in San Francisco on 24 September. She was overhauled, and decommissioned at San Diego on 30 April 1946, then entered the Pacific Reserve Fleet, Bremerton, and was berthed at Bremerton, Wash.

On 1 May 1968, the ship was stricken from the Naval Vessel Register, and in May 1970 she was sold and broken up for scrap.

== Honors ==
John D. Henley received six battle stars for World War II service.
