= Robert Henley (naval officer) =

American naval officer (1783–1828)

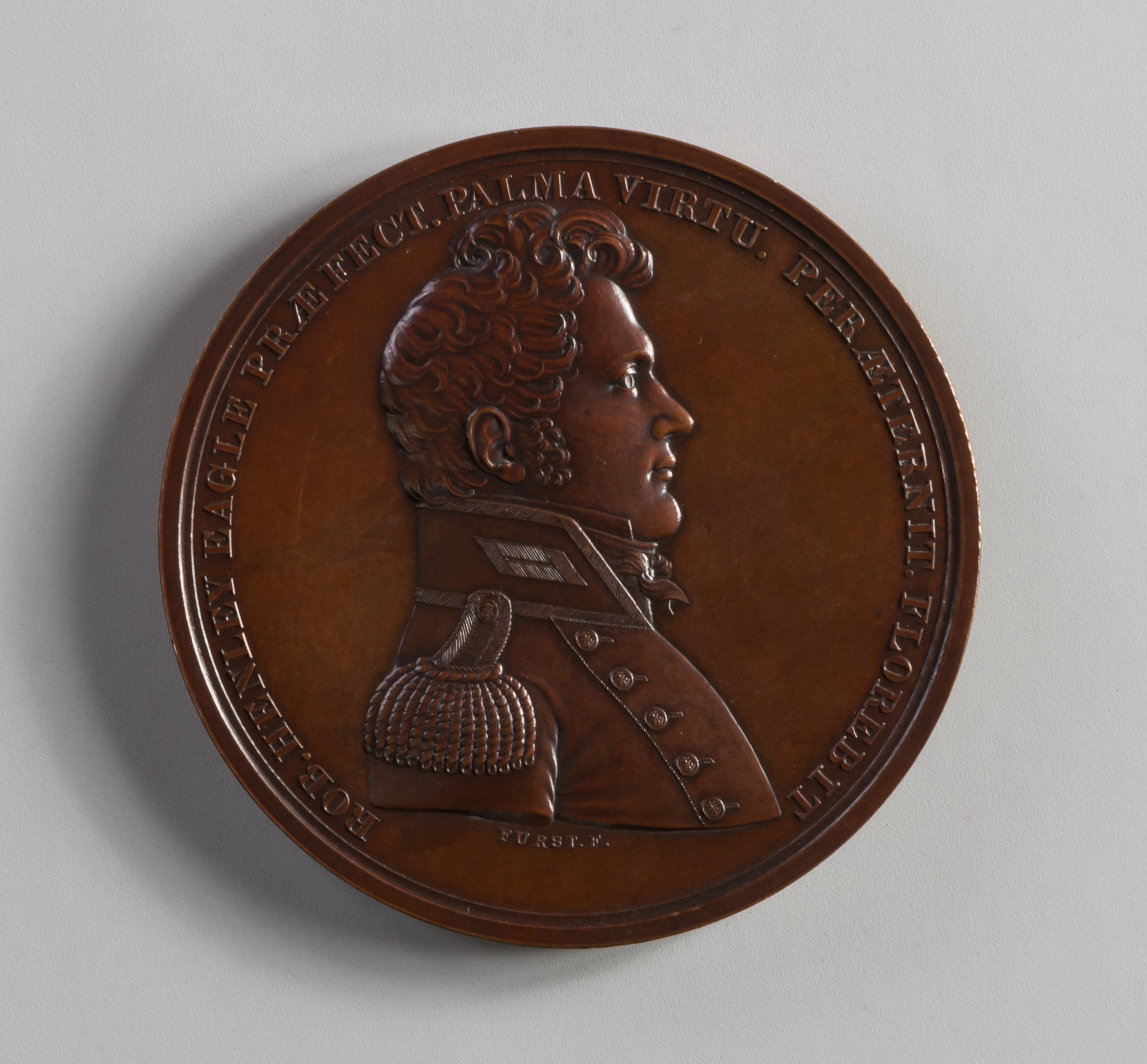
- medal by Moritz Fuerst
- Born: January 5, 1783; Williamsburg
- Died: October 6, 1828
- Mother: Elizabeth Dandridge Aylett Henley
- Relatives: John D. Henley

Captain Robert Henley (January 5, 1783 – October 6, 1828) was an officer in the United States Navy during the Quasi-War with France, the War of 1812, and the Second Barbary War. He was the brother of Captain John Dandridge Henley, USN (1781–1835), who served during the First Barbary War and the War of 1812.

Born in Williamsburg, Virginia and educated at the College of William and Mary, Robert Henley was the son of Leonard and Elizabeth Dandridge Henley and the nephew of Martha Dandridge Custis Washington. Henley was appointed a midshipman on April 8, 1799. Midshipman Henley then participated in the engagement on February 2, 1800 between Constellation and La Vengeance during the Quasi-War with France.

After service with Edward Preble's squadron in the Mediterranean and a cruise to the East Indies, Henley received his first command, Gunboat No. 5, at Baltimore, Maryland on April 9, 1808. Henley was in command of two divisions of 15 gunboats which drove three British frigates from Hampton Roads on June 20, 1813. Reporting to brig Eagle, he received the Thanks of Congress and a Congressional Gold Medal for valiant conduct in the Battle of Lake Champlain September 11, 1814.

With the end of the War of 1812, Henley filled a variety of billets before commanding Hornet against pirates in the West Indies. He captured the pirate schooner Moscow off Santo Domingo October 29, 1821. After serving as commandant of the Naval Rendezvous at Norfolk 1822 to 1824, he reported for similar duty at Charleston, South Carolina.

Captain Robert Henley died at Sullivan's Island, Charleston, after a short illness October 7, 1828. He was buried in St. Michael's Episcopal Church (Charleston, South Carolina).

See USS Henley for ships named in his honor.
