= Hanley (disambiguation) =

Hanley is a town in Stoke-on-Trent, Staffordshire, England.

Hanley may also refer to:

== People ==
- Hanley (name)

== Places ==
=== Canada ===
- Hanley, Saskatchewan, a town
  - Hanley (Saskatchewan electoral district)

=== United Kingdom ===
- Hanley (UK Parliament constituency), a former borough constituency in Staffordshire
- Hanley Castle, a village and civil parish in Worcestershire, England
  - Hanley Castle (castle), a 13th-century castle in the village of Hanley Castle
  - Hanley Swan, in Hanley Castle parish
- Hanley, Worcestershire, is a civil parish in Worcestershire, England
  - Hanley Child, a place in that civil parish
  - Hanley William, a place in that civil parish

=== United States ===
- Hanley Hills, Missouri, a village

== Other uses ==
- William Hanley Trophy, awarded to the Most Sportsmanlike Player in the Ontario Hockey League

== See also ==
- Handley (disambiguation)
- Hanle (disambiguation)
- Hanly
