= Handley (surname) =

Handley is a surname. Notable people with the surname include:

- Brian Handley, soccer player
- Benjamin Handley (1784–1858), English politician and member of parliament for Boston
- Carol Handley, Classics educator
- Chris S. Handley, comic collector in United States v. Handley
- David Handley (farmer), activist
- Dick Handley (1922–2012), American football player
- Elizabeth Handley-Seymour (c. 1873–1948), English fashion designer
- Eric Handley CBE (1926–2013), professor of Greek at Cambridge and University College, London
- George Handley (disambiguation), multiple people, including

- George Handley (politician) (1752–1793), American politician from Georgia
- George Handley (footballer, born 1868) (1868–1938), English footballer
- George Handley (footballer, born 1886) (1886–1952), English footballer
- George Handley (footballer, born 1912) (1912–1943), English footballer
- George B. Handley, professor of humanities at Brigham Young University

- Harold W. Handley, American politician from Indiana
- Jody Handley, English footballer
- Joe Handley, Canadian politician from the Northwest Territories
- Lee Handley (1913–1970), Major League baseball player
- Mary Ann Handley (1936–2023), American politician from Connecticut
- Matthew Handley, radio host on Ave Maria Radio
- Paul M. Handley, American journalist, wrote The King Never Smiles (biography of Thai King Bhumibol)
- Ray Handley, American football coach
- Taylor Handley, actor
- Tommy Handley, comedian
- Vernon Handley, conductor
- Wayne Handley, airshow performer
- Wal Handley, motorcycle racer
