= George Handley =

George Handley may refer to:

- George Handley (politician) (1752–1793), American politician
- George Handley (footballer, born 1868) (1868–1938), English footballer
- George Handley (footballer, born 1886) (1886–1952), English footballer
- George Handley (footballer, born 1912) (1912–1943), English footballer
- George B. Handley, Australian scientist

== See also ==
- George Handley Knibbs (1858–1929), Australian scientist
