= Queen Elizabeth II: Her Life in Style =

Exhibition at Buckingham Palace

Queen Elizabeth II: Her Life in Style is an art exhibition at the King's Gallery, Buckingham Palace. It has been curated by Caroline de Guitaut, LVO, FSA, the Surveyor of the King's Works of Art, and is one of the events to mark the centenary of Queen Elizabeth II’s birth. The exhibition is open from 10 April to 18 October 2026 and presents more than 300 items from her wardrobe.

The exhibition is the largest display of the late Queen’s fashion. It explores the evolution of her style from princess to monarch and examines the role of clothing in shaping her public image and identity, highlighting her close involvement in the design and symbolic meaning of her attire. The exhibition received multiple positive reviews.

== Exhibition ==
The exhibition presents more than 300 items from the wardrobe of Queen Elizabeth II, making it the largest display of her fashion to date. Around half of the items had not previously been exhibited.

The exhibits include a range of ceremonial and daywear garments, such as her 1947 wedding dress, her coronation gown, and outfits worn for major occasions such as the 2012 Summer Olympics in London. A collection of hats and tiaras is also included. Designers featured include Norman Hartnell, Hardy Amies and Angela Kelly.

== Reception ==
The exhibition received positive reviews. The Daily Telegraph described it as a "showstopping, once-in-a-lifetime survey" and "the largest display of the monarch’s wardrobe ever staged", praising its scale, curation, and emotional impact. Reviewing for The Times, Anna Murphy likewise praised its presentation and scope, describing the display as a "kaleidoscope" of garments showing the Queen's evolving style across decades. Both newspapers gave the exhibition four stars.
