= Hanley (name) =

Hanley is both a surname and a given name. Notable people with the name include:

== Surname ==
=== Arts and entertainment ===
- Bill Hanley (sound engineer) (born 1937), American audio engineer
- Bridget Hanley (1941–2021), American actress
- Catherine Hanley (born 1972), Australian-born British writer and medievalist
- Cliff Hanley (1922–1999), Scottish journalist, novelist, playwright and broadcaster
- Daniel P. Hanley (born 1955), American film editor
- Ellen Hanley (1926–2007), American musical theater performer
- Gerald Hanley (1916–1992), English novelist and travel writer
- James Hanley (novelist) (1897–1985), English novelist and playwright
- James Hanley (painter) (born 1965), Irish painter and designer
- James F. Hanley (1892–1942), American songwriter
- Jenny Hanley (born 1947), English actress
- Jimmy Hanley (1918–1970), British actor
- Kay Hanley (born 1968), American musician
- Lynne Hanley (born 1943), American feminist author and literary critic
- Paul Hanley (musician) (born 1964), British musician
- Quincy Hanley (born 1986), professionally known as Schoolboy Q, American rapper
- Roberta Hanley, American actor and movie director
- Steve Hanley (musician) (born 1959), English musician
- Susan Hanley (born 1939), American academic, author, Japanologist and historian
- Victoria Hanley, American young adult fantasy novelist
- Vincent Hanley (1954–1987), Irish radio DJ and television presenter
- William Hanley (1931–2012), American playwright, novelist, and scriptwriter

=== Politics, law and governance ===
- Barbara Hanley (1882–1959), Canadian politician
- Edward Hanley (state cabinet secretary) (1928–2007), American government official
- Edward T. Hanley (1932–2000), American labour activist and union president
- Eugene Hanley (1926–2009), American labor leader
- Frank Hanley (1909–2006), Canadian politician
- Geoffrey Hanley (born 1972), Kittitian politician
- James Hanley (1847–1916), Irish-born American railroad man and politician
- James M. Hanley (1920–2003), American politician
- Jeremy Hanley (1945–2026), British politician
- Joe R. Hanley (1876–1961), American lawyer and politician
- Katherine Hanley (born 1943), American politician
- Leo B. Hanley (1908–1994), American jurist
- Michael Hanley (1918–2001), English director-general of MI5
- Val Hanley, former Mayor of Galway, Ireland

=== Sport ===
- Ben Hanley (born 1985), English racing driver
- Bill Hanley (ice hockey) (1915–1990), Irish-born Canadian ice hockey administrator
- Bo Hanley (1887–1980), American professional football player and coach
- Brian Hanley (born 1974), Irish hurler
- Dan Hanley (footballer) (1883 – after 1913), Australian-rules footballer
- Dick Hanley (American football) (1894–1970), American football player and coach
- Dick Hanley (swimmer) (1936–2022), American swimmer
- Ellery Hanley (born 1961), English rugby league player
- Finian Hanley (born 1985), Irish Gaelic footballer
- Grant Hanley (born 1991), Scottish footballer
- James Hanley (hurler) (1877–1915), Irish hurler
- Jim Hanley (1885–1961), American baseball pitcher
- Junior Hanley (born 1944), Canadian stock car driver and race car builder
- Martin Hanley (1918–2000), South African cricketer
- Pat Hanley (1896–1966), American college football head coach
- Paul Hanley (tennis) (born 1977), Australian tennis player
- Pearce Hanley (born 1988), Irish Australian-rules footballer
- Raheem Hanley (born 1994), English footballer
- Robin Hanley (1968–1996), English cricketer
- Rupert Hanley (born 1952), South African cricketer
- Steve Hanley (rugby union) (born 1979), English rugby footballer
- Tim Hanley (born 1960), American soccer goalkeeper
- Will Hanley (born 1990), Irish-American professional basketball player

=== Other fields ===
- Bill Hanley (rancher) (1861–1935), American cattle baron
- Ethel Salisbury Hanley (1890–1949), American speedboat racer
- John C. Hanley, American army officer
- Kitty Hanley (c. 1845 – 1917), Wiradjuri matriarch and midwife
- Paul J. Hanley (born 1949), American hospitality industry executive
- Richard Hanley, Zambian-born Australian philosopher
- Sylvanus Charles Thorp Hanley (1819–1899), British biologist
- Thomas J. Hanley Jr. (1893–1969), United States Air Force general

== Given name ==
- Robert Hugh Hanley Baird (1855–1934), Northern Irish newspaper proprietor
- Earl Hanley Beshlin (1870–1971), American politician
- Hanley Frias (born 1973), Dominican baseball player
- Hanley Funderburk (1931–2012), American academic administrator
- Robert Hanley Hall (1850–1924), Irish-born Canadian fur trader and politician
- Hanley Ramírez (born 1983), Dominican baseball player
- Frederick Hanley Seares (1873–1964), American astronomer
- Hanley Stafford (1899–1968) (born Alfred John Austin), English radio actor
- William Edward Hanley Stanner (1905–1981), Australian anthropologist

== Fictional characters ==
- Paul Hanley, a character in the TV series Peyton Place

== See also ==
- Hanly, a surname
