= Handlen =

Handlen is a surname. Notable people with the surname include:

- Frank Handlen (1916–2023), American painter
- Richard E. Handlen (1897–1963), American Thoroughbred horse racing trainer

== See also ==
- Handley (surname)
