= Handley =

Handley may refer to:

== Places ==
=== In the United Kingdom ===
- Handley, Cheshire, a village
- Handley, a hamlet in the parish of Stretton, Derbyshire
- Middle Handley, a hamlet in the parish of Unstone, Derbyshire
- Nether Handley, a hamlet in the parish of Unstone, Derbyshire
- West Handley, a hamlet in the parish of Unstone, Derbyshire
- Handley, a village in Dorset now known as Sixpenny Handley

=== In the United States ===
- Handley, Dallas County, Missouri
- Handley (Fort Worth), a former town currently located with the city of Fort Worth, Texas
- Handley, West Virginia
- John Handley High School, Winchester, Virginia

== Other uses ==
- Handley (surname)
- Handley Page H.P.42, British four-engine long-range biplane airliners in service from 1931 to 1940

== See also ==
- Hanley (disambiguation)
