= Ian Thomas (dressmaker) =

British dress designer (1929–1993)

Ian Thomas LVO (24 September 1929 – 2 June 1993) was a British dress designer who worked for Queen Elizabeth II of the United Kingdom.

Born in Middle Barton, Oxfordshire, on 24 September 1929, he later studied fashion at the Oxford College of Art and worked as a personal assistant to the couturier Norman Hartnell from 1953 to 1970 before opening his own business.

Thomas was appointed LVO in the 1977 Silver Jubilee and Birthday Honours. He died on 2 June 1993, aged 63.
