= Probert-Price Collection =

The Probert-Price Collection is a collection of items from the Probert-Price estate, primarily vintage dresses which belonged to Renee Probert-Price (1917-2013), a well-known London socialite. Probert-Price left over 300 dresses, hats, furs, shoes, and handbags dating from the 1930s and 1980s to her great-niece and goddaughter.

== Renee Probert-Price ==
Little is known of Probert-Price’s early life, but she was rumoured to be the illegitimate daughter of either a lord, a dealer of precious stones, or a tinned fruit merchant. Her mother, Florence May, was a well-known singer and Gaiety Girl in London.

Starting as a professional dancer as a young girl, Probert-Price embarked on a career in London’s West End theatres and nightclubs, during which time she appears to have used a variety of stage names. She then became a Tiller Girl at the London Palladium and was also associated with the Windmill Girls.

During her time managing the Club Panama Theatre in Soho, she met Douglas Probert-Price, whom she later married, in a drug bust. He was a detective at Scotland Yard. Once they were married, Douglas moved in to the large townhouse where his wife had been raised by her mother in Streatham.

Probert-Price lived as a recluse for the last 30 years of her life, especially after her husband’s death in 2000.

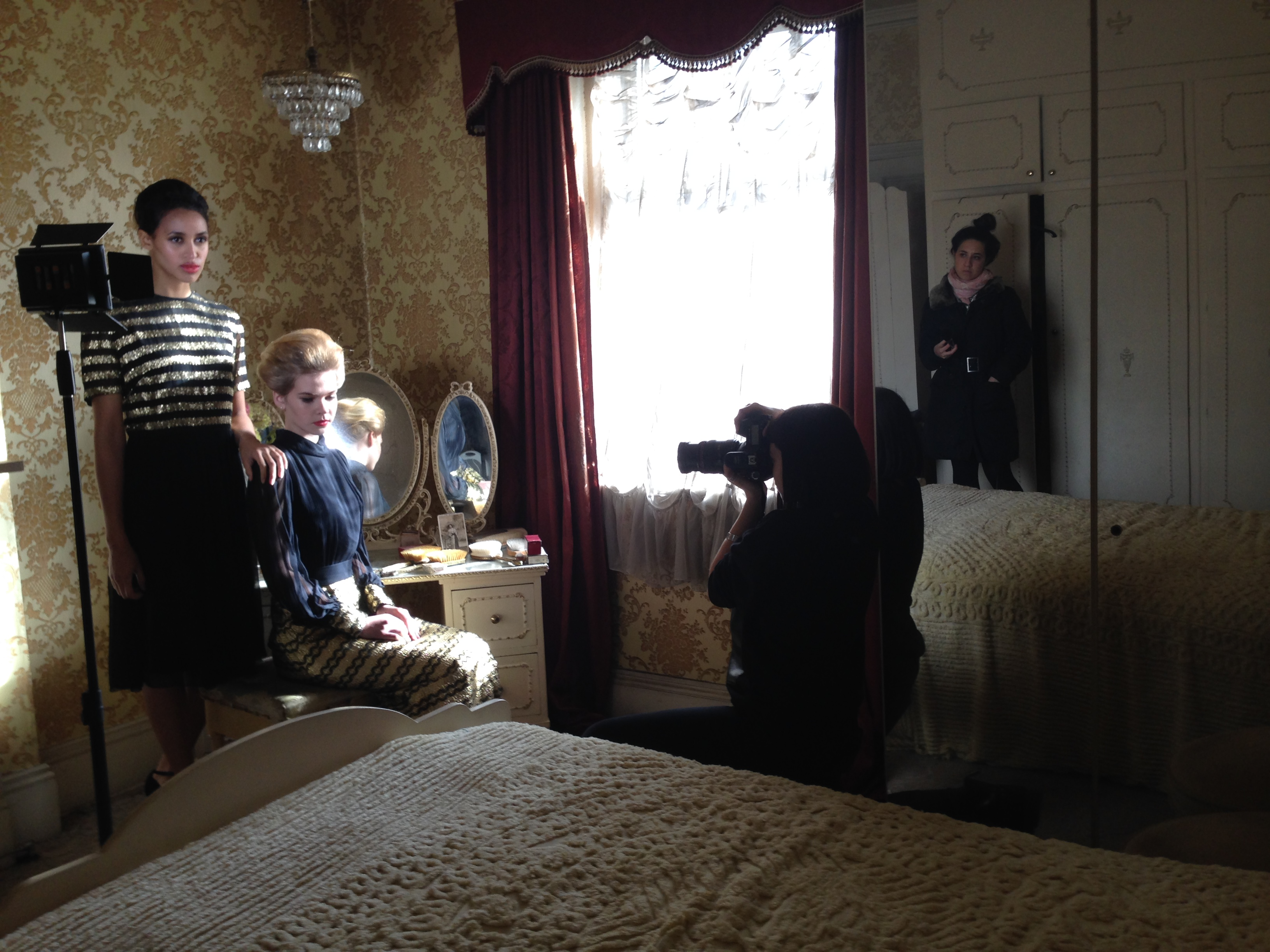
Work on the 2014 documentary

In 2014, the story of Renee Probert-Price was documented by her great-niece and goddaughter, with an independent film and exhibition.

== Collection ==
Probert-Price built up a vast collection of dresses over decades, which were left to her great-niece and goddaughter following her death in 2013. There are over 360 dresses in the collection.

The collection includes garments by over 140 designers and retailers, including Norman Hartnell, Christian Dior, Harvey Nichols, Bourne & Hollingsworth, Harrods, and Liberty. Most of the dresses have London labels, or were designed by Probert-Price and made in London by her personal dressmaker. An ensemble designed by Hartnell within the collection was previously exhibited in the Victoria and Albert Museum.
