= The Healer's Keep =

2002 novel by Victoria Hanley

- First US edition
- Author: Victoria Hanley
- Language: English
- Series: Seer and the Sword series
- Genre: Fantasy novel
- Publisher: David Fickling Books (UK); Holiday House (US)
- Publication date: September 2002 (UK); October 2002 (US)
- Publication place: United States
- Media type: Print (Hardback & Paperback)
- Pages: 384 pp
- ISBN: 0-8234-1760-3
- OCLC: 49031315
- LC Class: PZ7.H196358 He 2002
- Preceded by: The Seer and the Sword

The Healer's Keep is the second novel in the Seer and the Sword series, by Victoria Hanley. It was first published in 2002.

== Main characters ==
Princess Saravelda

Princess "Sara" Saravelda is the eldest daughter of Queen Torina and King Landen. She is fiery in spirit, yet very graceful in motion. She is highly gifted in the art of using gen, and is the first Firan to be seen at the Keep in over a hundred years.

Dorjan

Dorjan is the first Genoven, or Dreamwen, to come to the Keep in hundred of years. He is the son of Cabis Denon and a Charmal. His eyes are the same color as Maeve's.

Bern

Bern is a powerful Charmal who serves the Shadow King. He conspires to steal the gen from the Ellowens and the Keep and give it to the Shadow King.

Maeve

Maeve is the daughter of Lila the Fair, a highborn, and Cabis Denon, a lowborn free. Outraged at his daughter's love for a lowborn, Lila's father marked her as a slave and threw her out of the house. Maeve, in turn, was raised as a slave, but managed to escape being marked. She has golden hair and skin, with the deep blue eyes of her father. She is able to tell a person's nature by touching them, and her mother tells her where to find the Dreamwen Stone before she dies. She also had a lovely singing voice. Falls in love with Jasper.

Jasper

Jasper is a lowborn free who helps Maeve and Devin to escape. Later he falls in love with Maeve.

Evan

Evan is a young slave boy who works in the bathhouse with Maeve. He is marked by Lord Morlen, but his scars are healed through his dreams.

Orlo

Orlo is an experienced slave who works in the bathhouse. Lord Morlen takes him along to search for Maeve and gives him vahss, a drug, to make him submissive.

Lord Morlen

Lord Morlen is an Ebrowen who can find people through their dreams.

Queen Torina

After her marriage to Prince Landen, Princess Torina became the queen of Archeld and Bellandra. Many of her subjects are wary of her ruling after her father's invasion of Bellandra and her title as the Great Seer. She has three children: Saravelda, Dreena, and Veldon.

King Landen

After marrying Princess Torina, Landen became the King of Archeld and reclaimed the country of Bellandra. He is the wielder of the Sword of Bellandra, yet has never used it to take another man's life. His three children are Saravelda, Dreena, and Veldon.

== Minor characters ==
Lord Indol

Lord Indol is the original owner of Maeve, Lila, Orlo, and Evan

Ellowen Renaiya

Ellowen Renaiya is the mystic instructor who names the gifts of the Keep's students.

Ellowen Mayn

Ellowen Mayn is the Phytosen instructor at the Keep.
