= Hanle =

Hanle can mean:

- Hanle, located in eastern Indian Ladakh, near the Chinese border
  - The Indian Astronomical Observatory, adjacent to Hanle village, location of the highest major astronomical telescopes in the world and colloquially known as Hanle
  - Hanle River, a tributary of the Indus River flowing by the Hanle village
  - Hanle Monastery
- Wilhelm Hanle, German physicist
  - Hanle effect, a reduction in the polarisation of light caused by a magnetic field, named after Wilhelm Hanle
- Zack Hanle, American cookbook author

== See also ==
- Hanley (disambiguation)
