= Hanley William =

Village in Worcestershire, England

Coordinates: 52.295803°N 2.478238°W

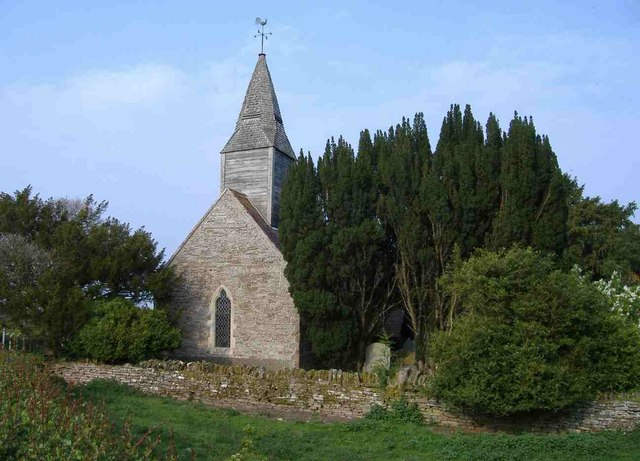
- All Saints Church

- Location within Worcestershire
- Civil parish: Hanley
- District: Malvern Hills
- Shire county: Worcestershire
- Region: West Midlands
- Country: England
- Sovereign state: United Kingdom
- Post town: Tenbury Wells
- Postcode district: WR15
- Police: West Mercia
- Fire: Hereford and Worcester
- Ambulance: West Midlands
- UK Parliament: West Worcestershire

Hanley William is a village and former civil parish, now in the parish of Hanley, in the Malvern Hills district, in the county of Worcestershire, England. In 1931 the parish had a population of 110. On 1 April 1933 the parish was abolished and merged with Hanley Child to form "Hanley".

Hanley William was in the upper division of Doddingtree hundred.

The name Hanley derives from the Old English hēahlēah meaning 'high wood/clearing'. The affix William derives from William de la Mare who held land in the village in 1242.

== Hanley William Air Strip ==
There is a small, private airfield with a single 600-metre-long grass runway, called the Hanley William Air Strip.
