= Victoria Hanley =

American writer

Victoria Hanley is an American young adult fantasy novelist. Her first three books, The Seer And The Sword, The Healer's Keep and The Light Of The Oracle are companion books to one another. Her newest book (released March 2012) is the sequel of a series, called Indigo Magic, published by Egmont USA. She's also published two non-fiction books through Cotton Wood Press; called Seize the Story: A Handbook For Teens Who Like To Write, and Wild Ink: A Grownups Guide To Writing Fiction For Teens.

== Works ==
=== Novels ===
- Healer and Seer series

- The Seer and the Sword (2000)
- The Healer's Keep (2002)
- The Light of the Oracle (2004)

- Tirfeyne series

- Violet Wings (2009)
- Indigo Magic (2012 Book) (2012)
- Sapphire Secrets (2019)
