= Hanley, Worcestershire =

Civil parish in Worcestershire, England

Coordinates: 52.29°N 2.49°W

Hanley
- Location within Worcestershire
- Population: 288 (2001 census)
- OS grid reference: SO668659
  - London: 97.2 mi (156.4 km) SE
- Civil parish: Hanley
- District: Malvern Hills
- Shire county: Worcestershire
- Region: West Midlands
- Country: England
- Sovereign state: United Kingdom
- Post town: Tenbury Wells
- Postcode district: WR15
- Police: West Mercia
- Fire: Hereford and Worcester
- Ambulance: West Midlands
- UK Parliament: West Worcestershire

Hanley is a civil parish in the district of Malvern Hills in the county of Worcestershire, England.

Hanley William and Hanley Child are places within the parish.

Edmund Bonner (ca.1500 – 1569), Bishop of London, 1539-1549 & 1553-1559 was born in the village; an instrumental figure in the schism of Henry VIII from Rome.
