= Hanley Child =

Village in Worcestershire, England

Coordinates: 52.28157°N 2.513616°W

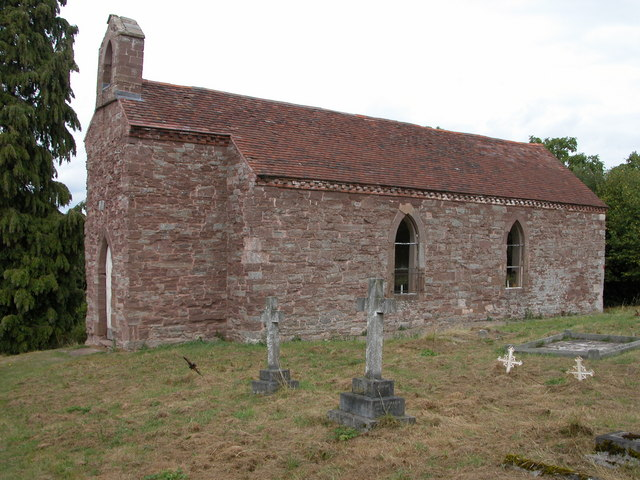
- Hanley Child Church

- Location within Worcestershire
- Civil parish: Hanley
- District: Malvern Hills
- Shire county: Worcestershire
- Region: West Midlands
- Country: England
- Sovereign state: United Kingdom
- Post town: Tenbury Wells
- Postcode district: WR15
- Police: West Mercia
- Fire: Hereford and Worcester
- Ambulance: West Midlands
- UK Parliament: West Worcestershire

Hanley Child is a village and former civil parish, now in the parish of Hanley, in the Malvern Hills district, in the county of Worcestershire, England. Hanley-Child was formerly a chapelry in the parish of Eastham, in 1866 Hanley Child became a civil parish, on 1 April 1933 the parish was abolished and merged with Hanley William to form "Hanley". In 1931 the parish had a population of 119.

Hanley Child was in the upper division of Doddingtree Hundred.

The name Hanley Child derives from the Old English hēahlēah cild meaning 'high wood/clearing of the child'.
