= Elizabeth Handley-Seymour =

British fashion designer

- Born: Elizabeth Fielding; 1867; Blackpool, England
- Died: 1948 (aged 80–81)
- Occupations: fashion designer and court-dressmaker
- Known for: created Queen Elizabeth's coronation gown in 1937
- Spouse: James Burke Handley-Seymour (m. 1901)

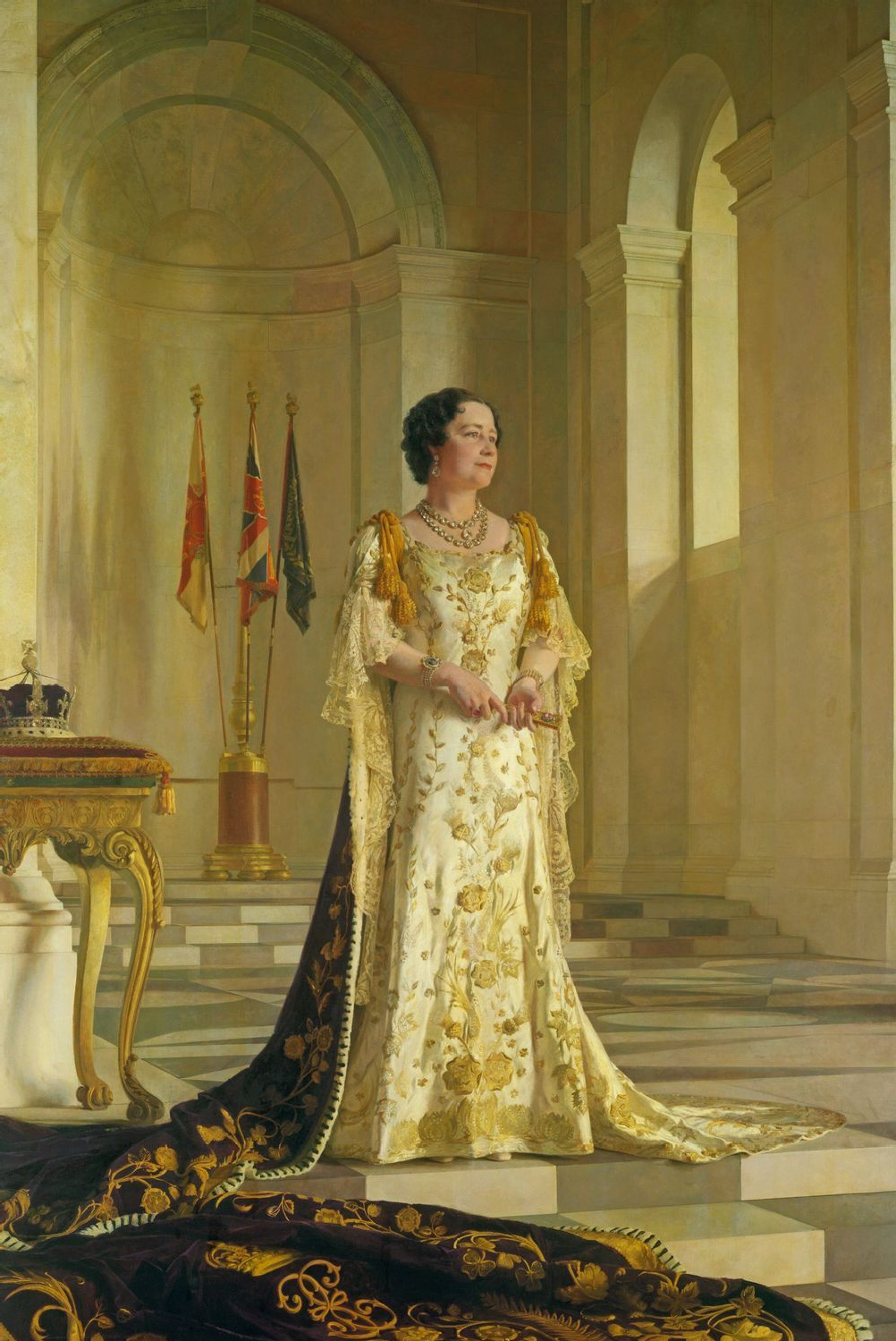
Queen Elizabeth in her coronation gown designed by Madame Handley-Seymour, 1937

Elizabeth Handley-Seymour (1867–1948) was a London-based fashion designer and court-dressmaker operating as Madame Handley-Seymour between 1910 and 1940. She is best known for creating the wedding dress worn by Elizabeth Bowes-Lyon, the future Queen Elizabeth the Queen Mother, for her marriage to the Duke of York, the future King George VI, in 1923; and later, Queen Elizabeth's coronation gown in 1937.

== Early life ==
Born Elizabeth Fielding in Blackpool in 1867, she moved to London in the 1890s and set herself up as a court-dressmaker. In 1901 she married Major James Burke Handley-Seymour. The Major was described as having been a lifelong art critic in 1938.

== Business ==
According to a 1938 newspaper article, Handley-Seymour launched her business in 1908–09 with a staff of four. By 1912 Handley-Seymour was based on Bond Street, and had received her first Court commissions. She was still located at Bond Street in 1938, with a staff of 200 making up her designs, while her husband handled the administrative side of the business.

From the beginning Handley-Seymour offered copies of Paris dresses for her clients, a practice that was very common among high end dressmakers in London at the time. A 1914 advertisement published in The Times listed a number of couturiers with whom Handley-Seymour had agreements to allow her to reproduce their models for her clientele, including Paul Poiret and the Callot Soeurs. Poiret was at that time considered one of the most avant-garde and daring couturiers, meaning that Handley-Seymour was catering to a clientele who expected to be offered the smartest, most fashionable Paris modes.

Many of the gowns provided by Madame Handley-Seymour were co-designed and created by Avis Ford, who started out as an apprentice in the 1910s and eventually became chief designer and fitter. Following the retirement of Handley-Seymour and at the request of Queen Mary, Ford opened her own couture establishment in the early 1940s on Albemarle Street, and continued to provide clothing to the Royal Family. While it was reported that Handley-Seymour retired before the end of World War II which broke out in September 1939, she was still offering designs to the Duchess of Devonshire and Queen Mary in early 1940. However Handley-Seymour Ltd. was not formally wound up until 1950, following the deaths of Madame Handley-Seymour in 1948 and her husband's death in Buckinghamshire on 12 August 1949.

=== Theatre design ===
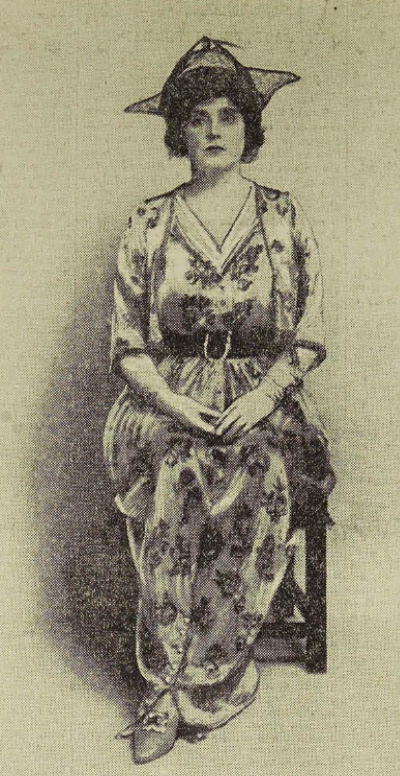
Mrs Patrick Campbell as Eliza Doolittle in Pygmalion, Act III. (1914)

One of Handley-Seymour's first high-profile clients was the actress Mrs. Patrick Campbell, who commissioned Handley-Seymour to create gowns for her role as Eliza Doolittle in the 1914 premiere of George Bernard Shaw's play Pygmalion. Campbell exploited the dramatic potential of her clothing to draw attention, depending on Handley-Seymour to produce garments that would "transcend mere modishness." To reflect Eliza's development from poor flower-seller to refined society lady, a dress worn midway through, in Act III, combined a fashionable cut with a gaudy yellow taffeta fabric with a brash "Futurist" print of scarlet roses. The final costume worn in the play, a pale grey dress and jacket with a boldly patterned black lining, presented Eliza as having achieved both fashionable refinement and freedom of thought, and was acclaimed by both the fashion press and the theatre critics. This final costume was adapted from a Paul Poiret ensemble.

Shaw later criticised Handley-Seymour's costumes, declaring the print dress "horrible" and the Poiret-inspired ensemble "dramatically nonsensical," although Kaplan and Stowell suggest that Campbell was taking inspiration from the Edwardian feminist who used refined and elegant attire to counteract accusations of being a "hammer-wielding suffragette." Through rewrites and revisions, Shaw would later attempt to diminish Campbell's contributions to his play and downplay the success of her Eliza dressed by Handley-Seymour. Alongside Campbell, other actresses costumed by Handley-Seymour between 1913 and 1938 included Irene Vanbrugh and Diana Wynyard.

=== Royal designs ===
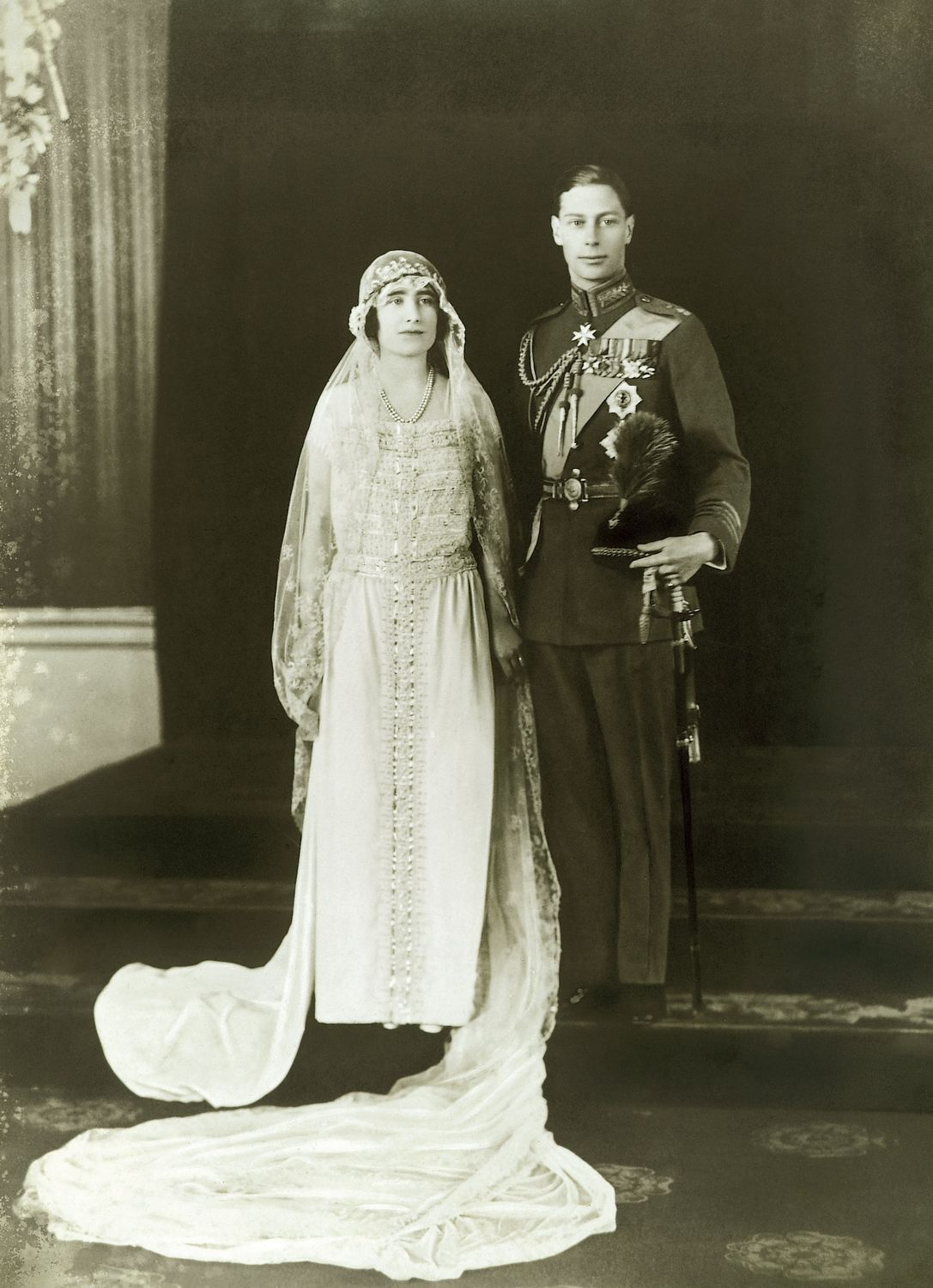
Wedding of the Duke of York (the future George VI) and Elizabeth Bowes-Lyon, 1923

In 1923 Handley-Seymour, at that time dressmaker to Queen Mary, was commissioned to make the bridal gown of Elizabeth Bowes-Lyon for her 26 April wedding to the Duke of York. The ivory chiffon moire dress was embroidered with pearls and silver thread, with a train of Flanders lace, and a girdle of silver leaves and green tulle fastened with silver roses and thistles. Handley-Seymour also made a number of outfits for the Duchess's trousseau, which were exhibited to the press on 20 April and were noted for their modestly neutral colours, such as a grey-beige going-away costume.

For the next 12 years Handley-Seymour remained the Duchess of York's favourite dressmaker, although by 1937 the Duchess – now queen consort following the abdication of Edward VIII – was transferring her patronage to Norman Hartnell. Despite this, Elizabeth commissioned Handley-Seymour to create her gown for the coronation (although Hartnell dressed the maids of honour). William Shawcross notes that, according to Elizabeth Longford, the Queen was aware that if Handley-Seymour had not been given the opportunity to make the coronation gown it would have upset her greatly. The transfer to Hartnell was not total, as he and Handley-Seymour both supplied clothes for Queen Elizabeth's wardrobe for the 1939 royal tour of Canada.

== Legacy ==
In 1958 the Handley-Seymours' daughter Joyce donated a number of Handley-Seymour design books ranging from 1910 to early 1940 to the Victoria and Albert Museum. The breadth and scope of the collection of 51 volumes of designs is seen as an "unrivalled" record of a court-dressmaker's work.
