= Norman Hartnell =

British fashion designer (1901–1979)

Sir Norman Hartnell KCVO
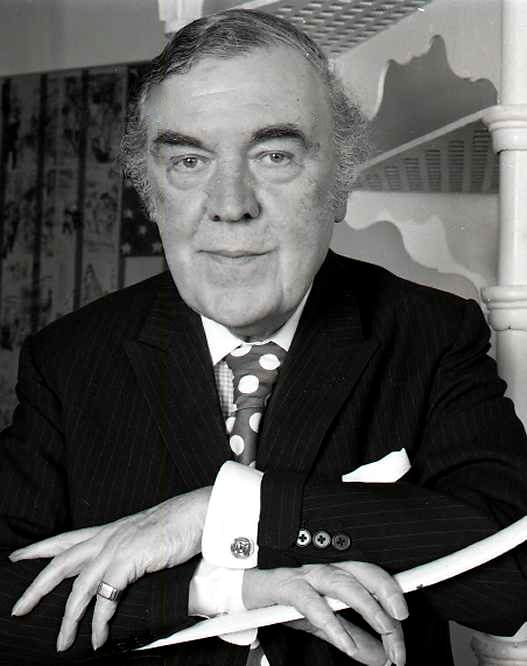
- Hartnell in 1972, by Allan Warren
- Born: Norman Bishop Hartnell; 12 June 1901; Streatham, London, England
- Died: 8 June 1979 (aged 77); Windsor, Berkshire, England
- Education: University of Cambridge
- Known for: Coronation gown of Elizabeth II
- Label: Norman Hartnell
- Relatives: William Hartnell (second cousin)
- Awards: KCVO 1977, MVO 1953, Officier de l'Ordre des Palmes Academiques 1939, Neiman Marcus Fashion Award 1947

Sir Norman Bishop Hartnell KCVO (12 June 1901 – 8 June 1979) was a leading British fashion designer, best known for his work for the ladies of the royal family. Hartnell gained the Royal Warrant as Dressmaker to Queen Elizabeth (later the Queen Mother) in 1940, and Royal Warrant as Dressmaker to Queen Elizabeth II in 1957.

== Early life and career ==
Hartnell was born in Streatham, southwest London. His parents were then publicans and owners of the Crown & Sceptre, at the top of Streatham Hill. Educated at Mill Hill School, Hartnell became an undergraduate at Magdalene College, Cambridge and read Modern Languages.

Hartnell's main interests were in performing in, and designing for, productions at Cambridge University, and first came to fashion after designing for the university's Footlights performances whilst an undergraduate, a production which transferred to Daly's Theatre, London. He then worked unsuccessfully for two London designers, including Lucile, whom he sued for damages when several of his drawings appeared unattributed in her weekly fashion column in the London Daily Sketch.

In 1923, Hartnell opened his own business at 10 Bruton Street, Mayfair, with the financial help of his father and first business colleague, his sister Phyllis.

The Doctor Who actor William Hartnell was his second cousin.

== 1923–1934 ==
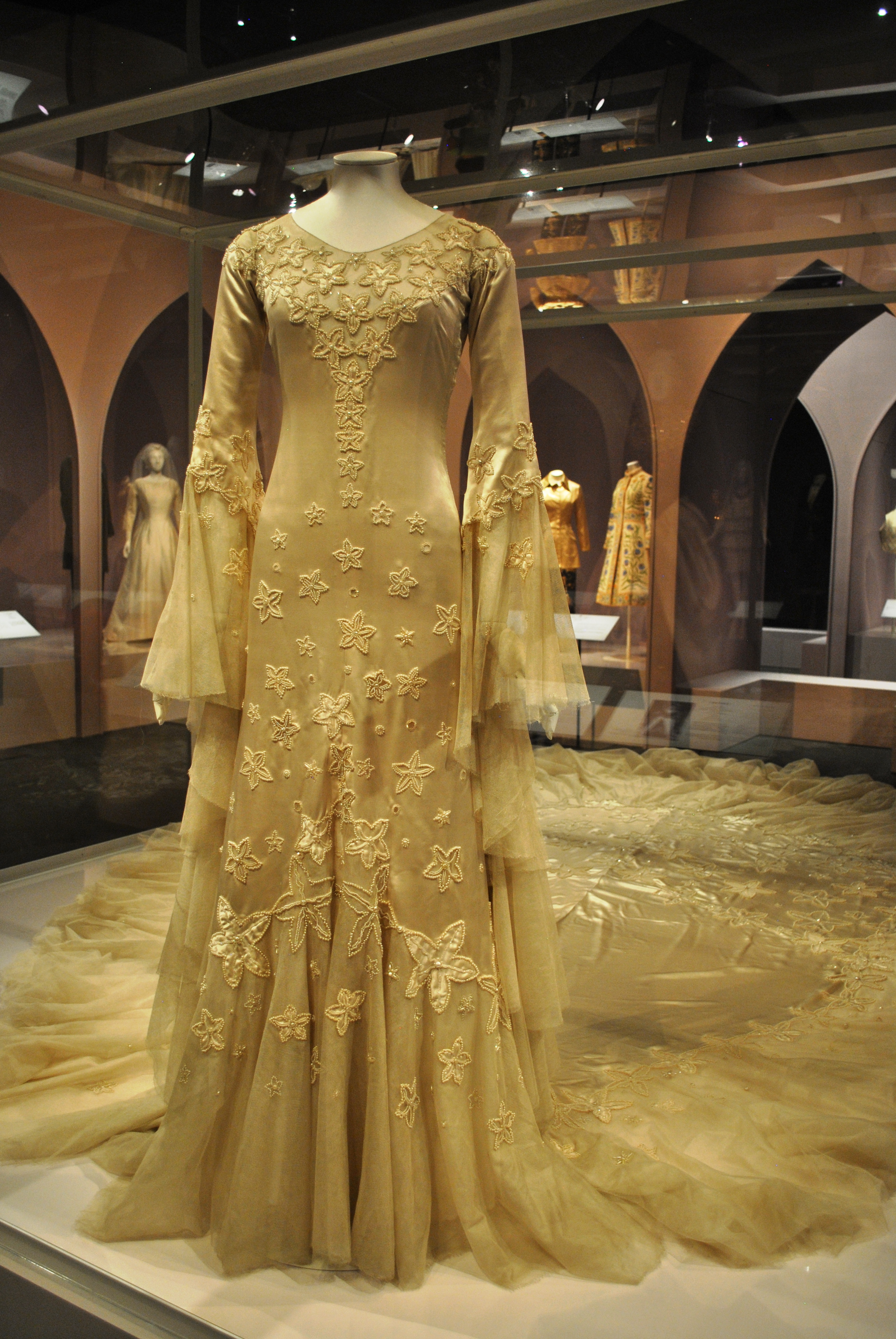
Wedding dress worn by Margaret Whigham, later the Duchess of Argyll, for her marriage to Charles Sweeny in 1933. Silk satin and tulle embroidered with glass beads with a 2.6 metres (8.5 ft) train. An early example of a dress designed for a single occasion, rather than repeated use. V&A Museum.

Thanks to his Cambridge connections, Hartnell acquired a clientele of débutantes and their mothers, who desired fashionable and original designs for a busy social life centred on the London Season. Hartnell was considered by some to be a good London alternative to Parisian or older London dress houses, and the London press seized on the novelty of his youth and gender.

Although expressing the spirit of the Bright Young Things and Flappers, his designs overlaid the harder silhouettes with a fluid romanticism in detail and construction. This was most evident in Hartnell's predilection for evening and bridal gowns, gowns for court presentations, and afternoon gowns for guests at society weddings. He designed the bridal gown for Claire Huth Jackson in 1935, when she married Louis de Loriol - He became guardian to their son Peter-Gabriel. Hartnell's success ensured international press coverage and a flourishing trade with those no longer content with 'safe' London clothes derived from Parisian designs. Hartnell became popular with the younger stars of stage and screen, and went on to dress such leading ladies as Gladys Cooper, Elsie Randolph, Gertrude Lawrence (also a client of Edward Molyneux), Jessie Matthews, Merle Oberon, Evelyn Laye and Anna Neagle; even top French stars Alice Delysia and Mistinguett were said to be impressed by Hartnell's designs.

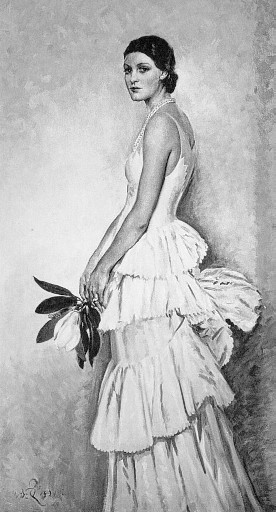
Magnolia (1931) by William Bruce Ellis Ranken, showing a dress by Hartnell. The painting was given to Hartnell at Ranken's death in 1941.

Alarmed by a lack of sales, his sister Phyllis insisted that Norman cease his pre-occupation eveningwear and instead focus on creating practical day clothes. Hartnell utilised British woollen fabrics to subtle and ingenious effect; though previously sidelined by London dressmaking, the use of wool fabrics in ladies' day clothing had already successfully demonstrated in Paris by Coco Chanel, who showed a keen interest in his 1927 and 1929 collections.

Hartnell successfully emulated his British predecessor and hero Charles Frederick Worth by taking his designs to the heart of world fashion. Hartnell specialised in expensive and often lavish embroidery as an integral part of his most expensive clothes, which he also utilised to prevent exact ready-to-wear copies being made of his clothing. The Hartnell in-house embroidery workroom was the largest in London couture, and continued until his death in 1979, also producing the embroidered Christmas cards for clients and press during quiet August days, a practical form of publicity at which Hartnell was adept. The originality and intricacy of Hartnell embroideries were frequently described in the press, especially in reports of the original wedding dresses he designed for socially prominent young women during the 1920s and 1930s.

== 1934–1940 ==
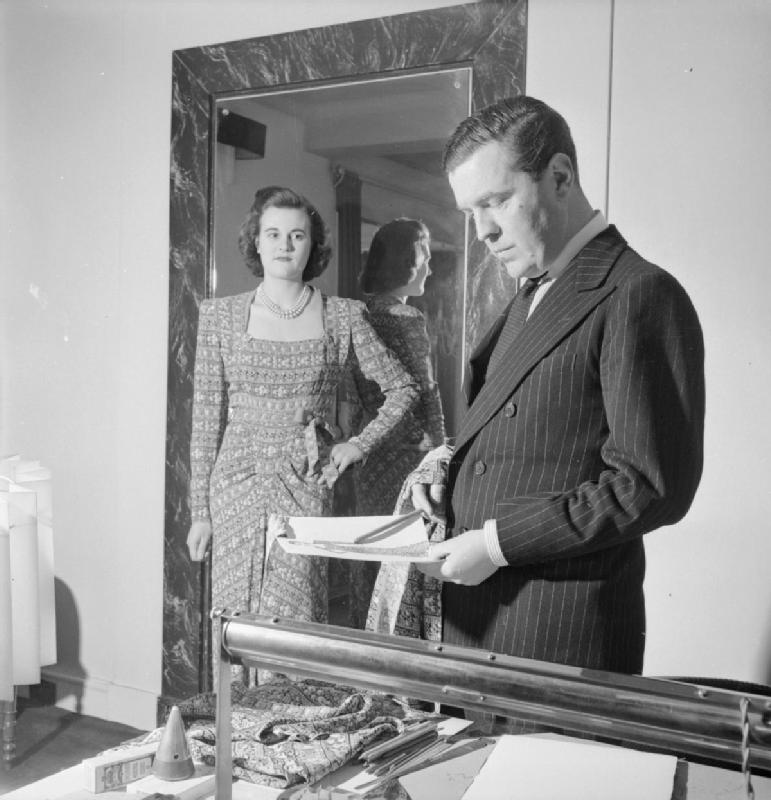
Hartnell at work in his London studio during wartime

By 1934, Hartnell's success had outgrown his premises, and he moved over the road to a large Mayfair town house already provided with floors of work-rooms at the rear to Bruton Mews. The first-floor salon was the height of modernity, a glass and mirror-lined Art Moderne space designed by the innovative young architect Gerald Lacoste (1909–1983), and proved the perfect background for each new season of Hartnell designs. The interiors of the large late 18th-century town house are now preserved as one of the finest examples of art-moderne pre-war commercial design in the UK.

At the same time Hartnell moved into the new building, he acquired a weekend retreat, Lovel Dene, a Queen Anne cottage in Windsor Forest, Berkshire. The cottage was extensively re-modelled for him by Lacoste. Hartnell's London residence, The Tower House, Park Village in West Regent's Park, was also remodelled and furnished with a fashionable mixture of Regency and modern furniture.

In 1935, Hartnell received the first of what was to be numerous commissions from the British royal family, in designing the wedding dress and bridesmaid's dresses for the wedding of Lady Alice Montagu Douglas Scott to Prince Henry, Duke of Gloucester. The two bridesmaids were Princess Elizabeth and Princess Margaret. Both King George V and Queen Mary approved the designs, the latter also becoming a client. The Duchess of York, then a client of Elizabeth Handley-Seymour, who had made her wedding dress in 1923, accompanied her daughters to the Hartnell salon to view the fittings and met the designer for the first time.

Although Hartnell's designs for the Duchess of Gloucester's wedding and her trousseau achieved worldwide publicity, the death of the bride's father and consequent period of mourning before the wedding led to what had been planned as a large state wedding, taking place at Westminster Abbey, instead being held privately in the chapel of Buckingham Palace. Hartnell regretted that his work on the designs for the occasion had been denied worldwide publicity; however, vast crowds did see the newest member of the royal family drive off from Buckingham Palace wearing a Hartnell ensemble for her honeymoon, and the seal of royal approval led to increased business for Hartnell.

For the 1937 coronation of King George VI and Queen Elizabeth, the Queen ordered the maid of honour dresses from Hartnell, remaining loyal to Handley-Seymour for her coronation gown. Until 1939, Hartnell received most of the Queen's orders, and after 1946, with the exception of some country clothes, she remained a Hartnell client, even after his death. Hartnell's ability in adapting current fashion to a personal royal style began with designs with a slimmed-down fit for day and evening wear. The new Queen was short, and her new clothes gave her height and distinction; public day-clothes usually consisted of a long or three-quarter length coat over a slim skirt, often embellished with fur trimmings or some detail around the neck. His designs for the Queen's evening wear varied from unembellished slim dresses to evening wear embroidered with sequins and glass. There was a complete change of style apparent in designs for the grander evening occasions, when Hartnell re-introduced the crinoline to world fashion, after the King showed Hartnell the Winterhalter portraits in the Royal Collection. King George suggested that the style favoured earlier by Queen Victoria would enhance the Queen's presence.

Wallis Simpson, subsequently the Duchess of Windsor following her marriage to Edward VIII, was also a London Hartnell client, later patronizing Mainbocher, who made her wedding dress. Bocher was a friend of Hartnell's with whom the latter credited with sound early advice, when he showed his 1929 summer collection in Paris. Then a Vogue editor, Bocher told Hartnell that he had seldom seen so many wonderful dresses so badly made. Hartnell took his advice and employed the talented Parisian 'Mamselle' Davide, reputedly the highest paid member of any London couture house, and other talented cutters, fitters and tailors to execute his designs to the highest international couture standards by the 1930s. In 1929, Hartnell showed his clothes to the international press in Paris, and the floor-length hems of his evening dresses, after a decade of rising hems, were hailed as the advent of a new fashion, copied throughout the world as evidenced by the press of the time. His clothes were so popular with the press that he opened a House in Paris in order to participate in Parisian Collection showings.

Within a decade, Hartnell again effectively changed the fashionable evening dress silhouette, when more of the crinoline dresses worn by the Queen during the State Visit to Paris in July 1938 also created a worldwide sensation viewed in the press and on news-reels. The death of the Queen's mother, the Countess of Strathmore and Kinghorne, before the visit resulted in court mourning and a short delay in the dates of the visit to a vital British ally, of enormous political significance at a time when Germany was threatening war in Europe. Royal mourning dictated black and shades of mauve, which meant that all the clothes utilising colour for the planned June visit had to be re-made; Hartnell's workrooms worked long hours to create a new wardrobe in white, which Hartnell remembered had a precedent in British royal mourning protocol, and was not unknown for a younger queen.

Hartnell was decorated by the French government and his friend Christian Dior, creator of the full-skirted post-war New Look; Dior himself was not immune to the influence and romance of Hartnell's new designs, publicly stating that whenever he thought of beautiful clothes, it was of those created by Hartnell for the 1938 State Visit, which he viewed as a young aspirant in the fashion world. The crinoline fashion for evening wear influenced fashion internationally, and French designers were quick to take up the influence of the Scottish-born Queen and the many kilted Scots soldiers in Paris for the State Visit; day clothes featuring plaids or tartans were evident in the next season's collections of many Parisian designers.

The Queen commanded another extensive wardrobe by Hartnell for the Royal Tour of Canada and visit to North America during May and June 1939. At a critical time in world history, the visit cemented North American ties of friendship in the months before the outbreak of World War II in September 1939. The King and Queen were received with enormous acclaim by great crowds throughout the tour and visit and the dignity and charm of the Queen were undoubtedly aided by her Hartnell wardrobe; Adolf Hitler termed Queen Elizabeth "the most dangerous woman in Europe" on viewing film footage of the successful tour.

By 1939, largely due to Hartnell's success, London was known as an innovative fashion centre and was often visited first by American buyers before they travelled on to Paris. Hartnell had already had substantial American sales to various shops and copyists, a lucrative source of income to all designers. Some French designers, such as Anglo-Irish Edward Molyneux and Elsa Schiaparelli, opened London houses, which had a glittering social life centred around the Court. Young British designers opened their own Houses, such as Victor Stiebel and Digby Morton, formerly at Lachasse where Hardy Amies was the designer after 1935. Peter Russell also opened his own House, and all attracted younger women. Older more staid generations still patronised the older London Houses of Handley-Seymour, Reville and the British-owned London concessions of the House of Worth and Paquin. Before Hartnell established himself, the only British designer with a worldwide reputation for originality in design and finish was Lucile, whose London house closed in 1924.

The younger members of the British royal family attracted worldwide publicity, drawing attention to Hartnell by association. Whilst it was a triumph for Hartnell to have gained Queen Mary as a client, the four young wives of her four sons created fashion news. Princess Marina, was a notable figure and a patron of Edward Molyneux in Paris. He designed her 1934 wedding dress and the bridesmaids dresses for her marriage to Queen Mary's fourth son Prince George, Duke of Kent and when Molyneux opened his London salon, also designed by Lacoste, she became a steady client of his until he closed the business in 1950. Thereafter, she was often a Hartnell client. Hartnell would go on to receive a Royal Warrant in 1940 as Dressmaker to the Queen.

== 1940–1952 ==
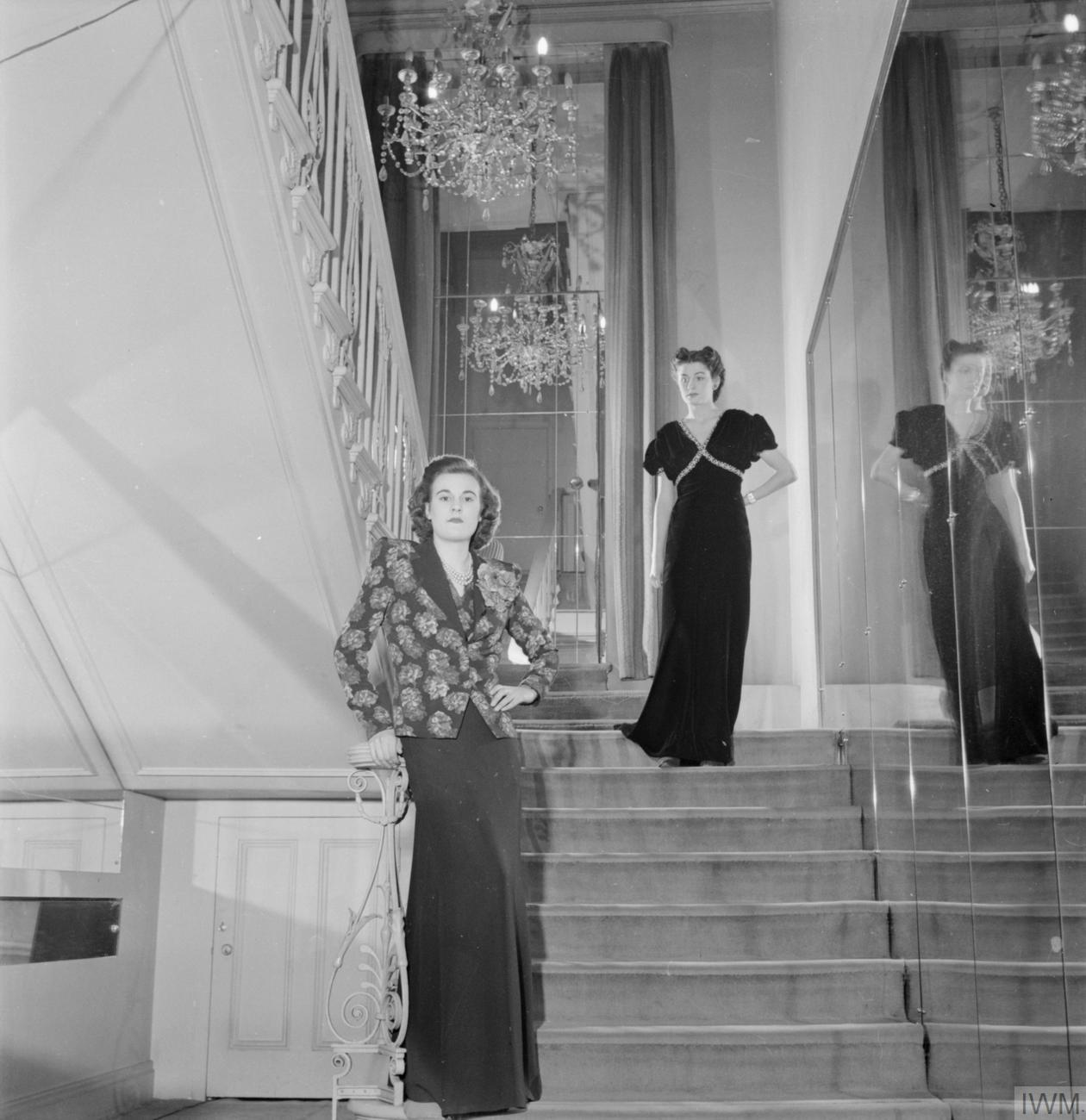
Hartnell designs produced in 1944 to promote the work of the Incorporated Society of London Fashion Designers

During the Second World War (1939–45) Hartnell - in common with other couture designers - was subject to government trading and rationing restrictions, part of the utility scheme; apart from specific rules on the amount of fabric allowed per garment, the number of buttons, fastenings and the amount and components of embroideries were all calculated and controlled. Hartnell joined the Home Guard and sustained his career by sponsoring collections for sale to overseas buyers, competing with the Occupied French and German designers, but also a growing group of American designers. Private clients ordered new clothes within the restrictions or had existing clothes altered. This also applied to the Queen, who appeared in her own often re-worked clothes in bombed areas around the country. Hartnell received her endorsement to design clothes for the government's Utility campaign, mass-produced by Berketex, with whom he entered a business relationship that continued into the 1950s. Through this partnership, he became the first leading mid-20th century designers to design mass-produced ready-to-wear clothing. In 1916, Lucile had shown the way during the First World War by designing an extensive line of clothes for the American catalogue retailers Sears, Roebuck.

Hartnell was among the founders of the Incorporated Society of London Fashion Designers, also known as IncSoc, established in 1942 to promote British fashion design at home and abroad. Hartnell was also commissioned to design women's uniforms for the British army and medical corps during the war. He would go on to design service uniforms for nurses and female officers in City of London Police and the Metropolitan Police.

In 1946 Hartnell took a successful collection to South America, where his clients included Eva Peron and Magda Lupescu. In 1947, he received the Neiman Marcus Fashion Award for his influence on world fashion and in the same year created an extensive wardrobe for Queen Elizabeth to wear during the Royal Tour of South Africa in 1947, the first Royal Tour abroad since 1939. Both slimline and crinoline styles were included. In addition, Hartnell designed for the young Princess Elizabeth and Princess Margaret; Molyneux also designed some day clothes for the Princesses during this trip.

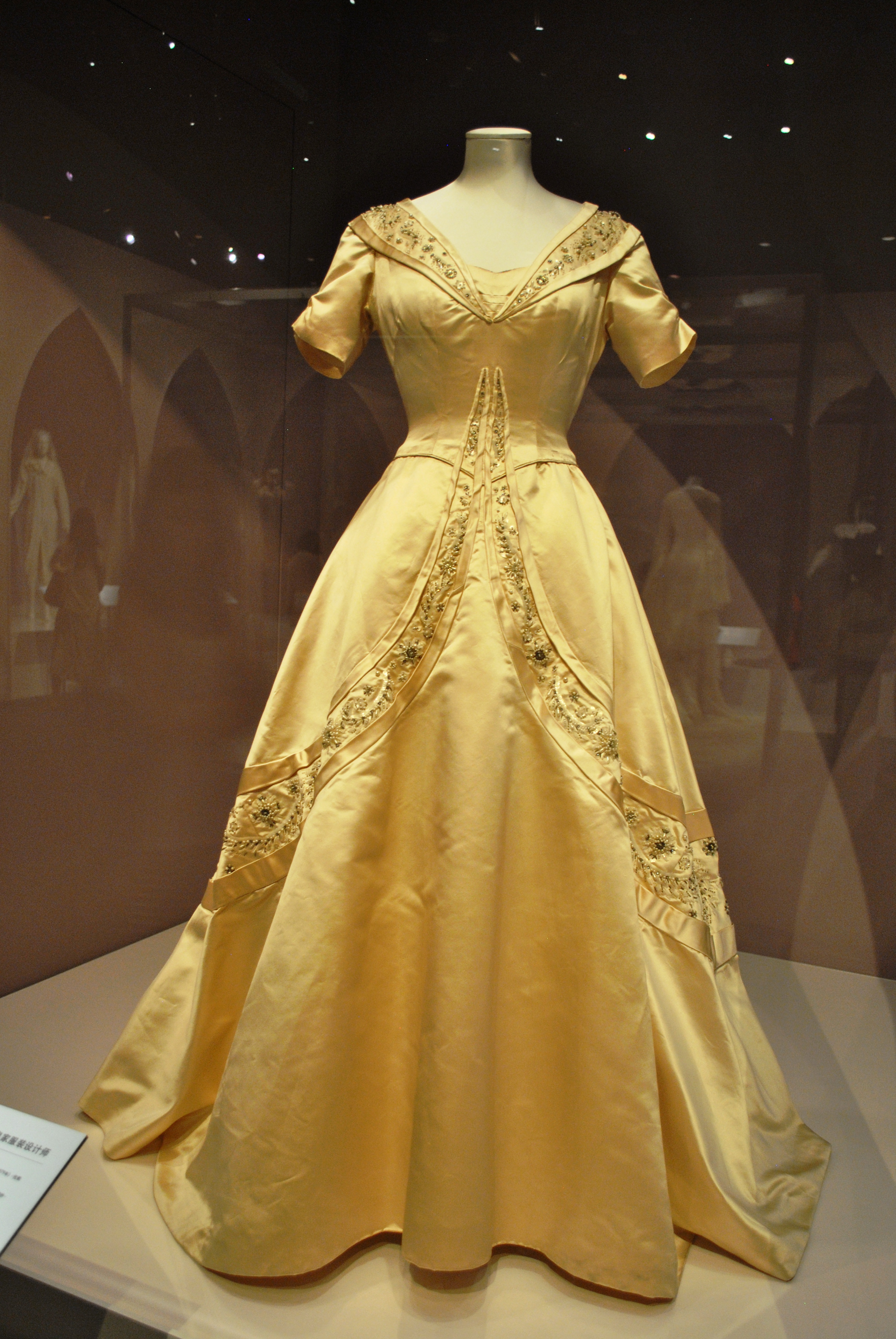
Embroidered wedding dress, 1951, worn by Hermione S. Ball for her marriage to Mervyn Evans, 23 July 1951. Hartnell added a band of embroidery to elongate the body and add grandeur to the back of the full skirt. V&A Museum.

Although worried that he was too old for the job at 46, Hartnell was commanded by the Queen to create the wedding dress of Princess Elizabeth in 1947 for her marriage to Prince Philip (later the Duke of Edinburgh). With a fashionable sweetheart neckline and a full skirt, the dress was embroidered with some 10,000 seed-pearls and thousands of white beads. Hartnell also created the going-away outfit and her trousseau, becoming her main designer to be augmented by Hardy Amies in the early 1950s and appealing to whole new generation of clients.

== 1952–1979 ==
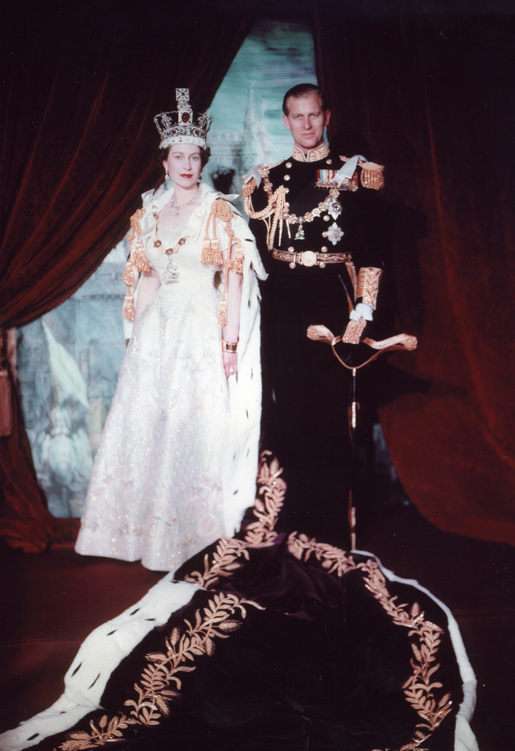
Hartnell designed the coronation gown of Elizabeth II, a complex process, due to the gown's weight and embroidery. Photograph by Sir Cecil Beaton.

Following the early death of George VI in 1952, Hartnell was asked by Queen Elizabeth II to design her 1953 coronation dress. Many versions were sketched by Hartnell and his new assistant Ian Thomas. These were then discussed with the Queen. At her request, the final design had the similar sweetheart neckline used for the Queen's wedding dress in 1947, with a fuller, heavy silk skirt embellished with varied embroideries, including the depiction of the national botanical emblems of the United Kingdom and Commonwealth countries, echoing earlier coronation dresses. The complicated construction of the supporting undergarments and frustrating hours of work involved were described by Hartnell in his autobiography; the weight of the dress made it difficult to achieve a perfect balance and lend a gentle, forward swaying motion, rather than the lurching, listing motion of the prototypes. The development of the prototypes was the work of his expert cutters and fitters, as Hartnell could not sew, although he understood construction and the handling of various fabrics.

In addition, Hartnell designed the accompanying dresses worn by the Queen's maids of honour and those of all major royal ladies in attendance, creating the necessary theatrical tableaux in Westminster Abbey. He also designed dresses for many other clients who attended the ceremony, and his summer 1953 collection of some 150 designs was named "The Silver and Gold Collection", subsequently used as the title for his autobiography, illustrated largely by his assistant Ian Thomas. Thomas subsequently opened his own establishment in 1968 and together with Hardy Amies created many designs included in the wardrobes of the Queen. The Queen undertook an increasingly large number of State visits and Royal tours abroad, as well as numerous events at home, all necessitating a volume of clothing too large for just one House to devote its time to. During 1953–54, the Queen made an extensive royal tour of most of the countries forming the British Commonwealth. The coronation dress was worn for the opening of Parliament in several countries, and her varied wardrobe gained press and newsreel headlines internationally, not least for the cotton dresses worn and copied worldwide, many ordered from a specialist wholesale company, Horrockses. Hartnell designs were augmented by a number of gowns from Hardy Amies, her secondary designer from 1951 onwards. Most of the ladies of the royal family used Hartnell, as well as other London designers, to create their clothes for use at home and abroad.

Hartnell's design for the wedding dress of Princess Margaret in 1960 marked the last full State occasion for which he designed an impressive tableau of dresses. It also marked the swan-song of lavish British couture. The Princess wore a multi-layered white princess line dress, totally unadorned, utilising many layers of fine silk, and requiring as much skill as the complexities of the Queen's Coronation dress, which it echoed in outline. The Queen wore a long blue lace day dress with a bolero, echoing the design with a slight bolero jacket and a hat adorned with a single rose, reminiscent of the Princess's full name, Margaret Rose. Victor Stiebel made the going-away outfit for the Princess and the whole wedding and departure of the couple from the Pool of London on HMY Britannia received worldwide newspaper and television publicity.

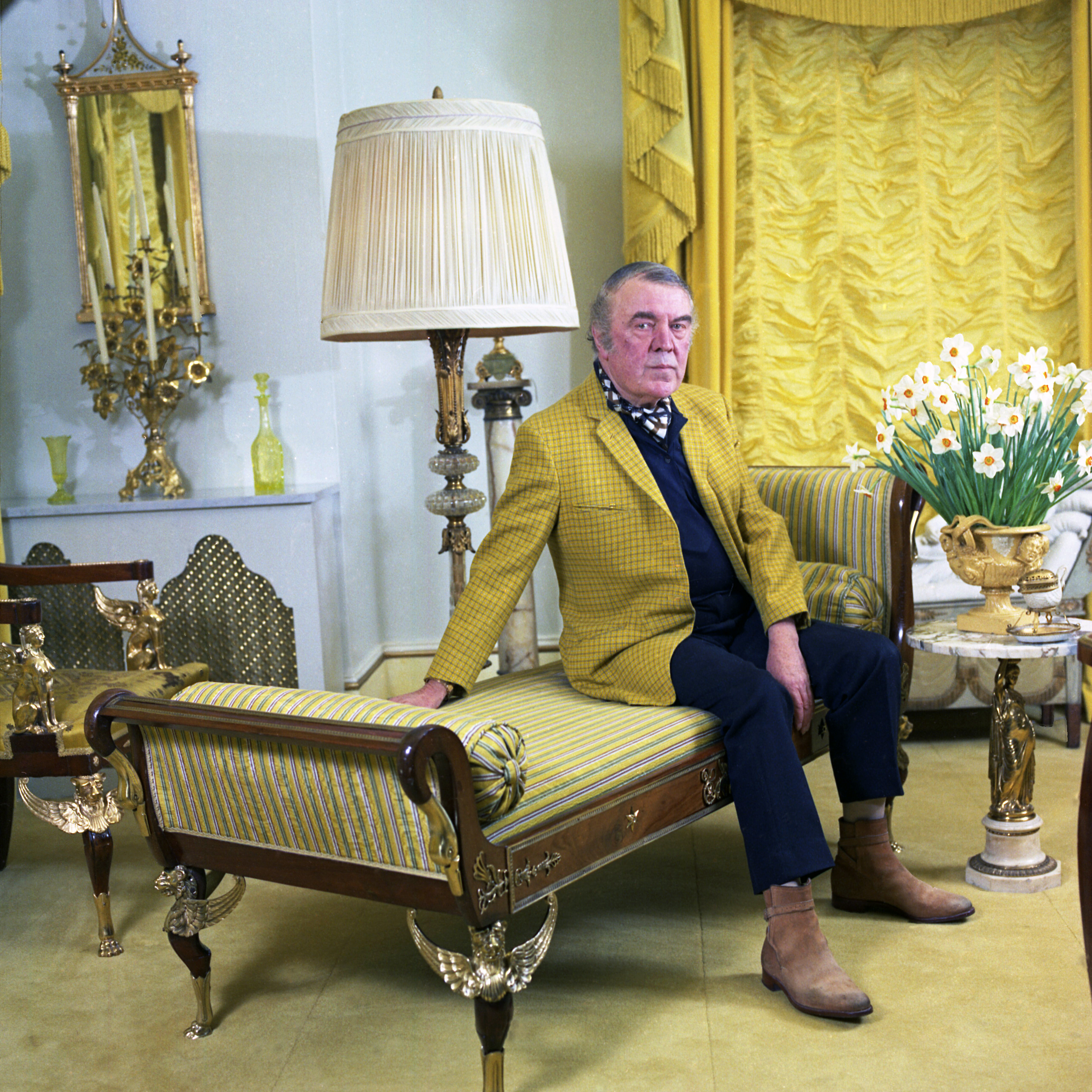
Hartnell in 1973, by Allan Warren

Fashion rapidly changed in the 1960s, and by the time of the investiture of the Prince of Wales in 1969, Hartnell's clothes for the Queen and Queen Elizabeth The Queen Mother were short, simple designs, reflecting their own personal style. His royal clothes created an impeccably neat look that managed to be stylish without making an overt fashion statement. Hartnell became increasingly pre-occupied with royal orders. In this he was helped by Thomas, who left to found his own establishment in 1966, and the Japanese designer Gun'yuki Torimaru, who similarly left to create his own highly successful business.

In 1968, Hartnell was involved with the redesign of female police uniforms for the Metropolitan Police.

In 1970, Madame Somoza, first lady of Nicaragua and client, issued a postage stamp dedicated to Hartnell.

In the mid-1950s, Hartnell reached the peak of his fame and the business employed some 500 people together with many others in the ancillary businesses. In common with all couture houses of the era, rising costs and changing tastes in women's clothing were a portent of the difficult times ahead. Throughout the 1950s and 1960s, the name of Norman Hartnell was continually found in the press. Apart from designing two collections a year and maintaining his theatrical and film star links, he was adept at publicity, whether it was in creating a full evening dress of pound notes for a news-paper stunt, touring fashion shows at home and abroad or using the latest fabrics and man-made materials. Memorable evening dresses were worn by the concert pianist Eileen Joyce and TV cookery star Fanny Cradock and typified his high profile as an innovative designer, although in his sixth decade - then considered to be a great age. Hartnell designed and created collections on a smaller scale until 1979 with designs for the Queen and Queen Elizabeth, the Queen Mother still commanding his time and attention. The business struggled with overheads in common with all couture businesses and various merchandising ventures had some success in helping to bolster the finances. The sale of 'In Love' scent and then other scents was re-introduced in 1954, followed by stockings, knitwear, costume jewellery and late in the 1960s, menswear. However, it was not enough to turn the tide of high-street youthful fashion and he even had to sell his country retreat Lovel Dene to finance the Bruton Street business.

At the time of the Queen's Silver Jubilee in 1977, Hartnell was appointed KCVO and on arriving at Buckingham Palace was delighted to find that the Queen had deputed Queen Elizabeth The Queen Mother to invest him with the honour. Prudence Glynn, the astute fashion editor then of The Times termed him "The First Fashion Knight" and his work as "The Norman Conquest". Hartnell designed and created collections on a smaller scale until 1979.

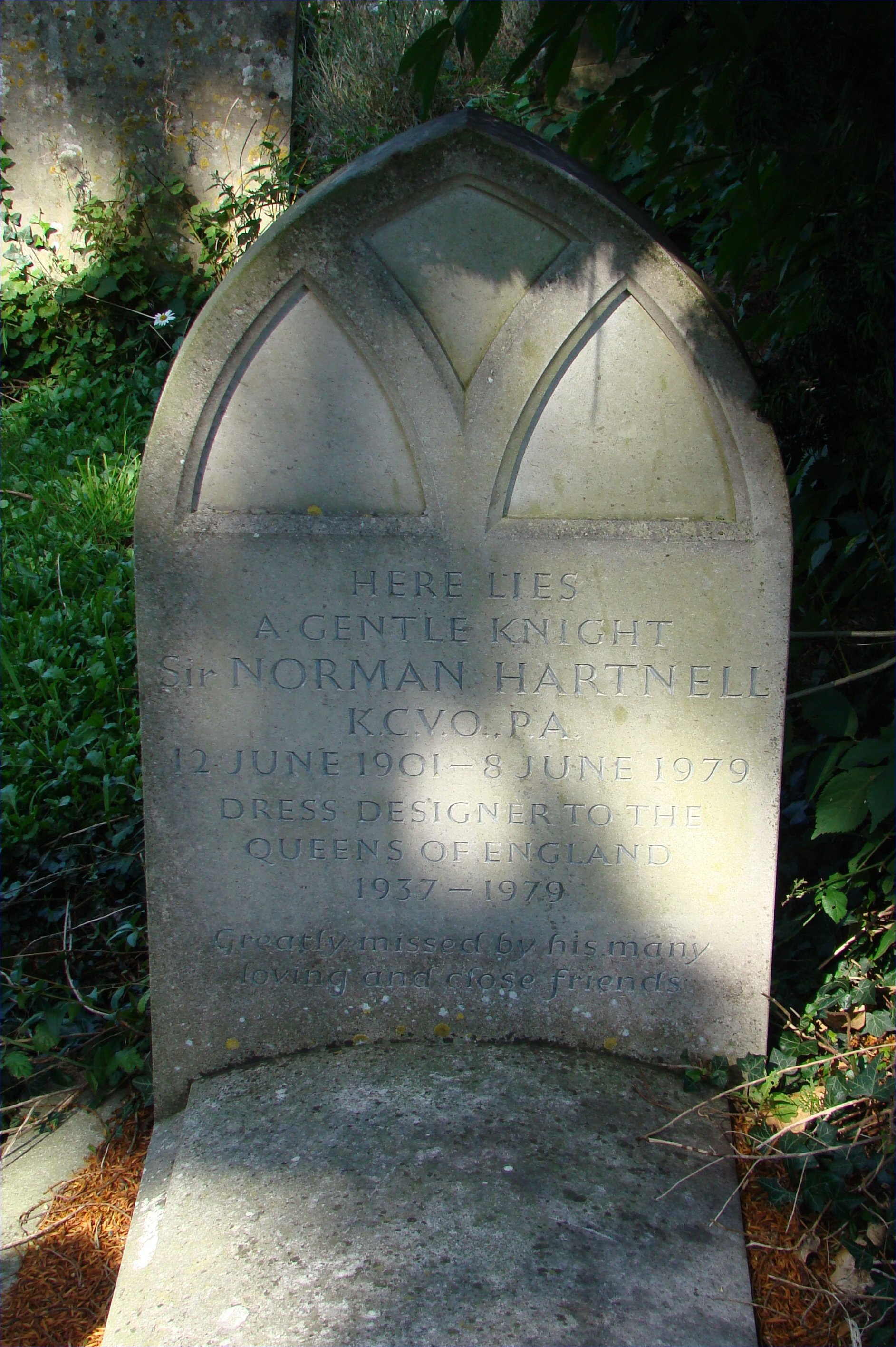
The grave of Sir Norman Hartnell, Clayton, Sussex

Hartnell was buried on 15 June 1979 next to his mother and sister in the graveyard of Clayton church, West Sussex. A memorial service in London was led by the then Bishop of Southwark, Mervyn Stockwood, a friend, and was attended by many models and employees and clients, including one of his earliest from the 1920s, his lifelong supporter Barbara Cartland, and another from a time as the Deb of the Year in 1930, Margaret Whigham. Wearing a spectacular Hartnell dress, her wedding to Charles Sweeny stopped the traffic in Knightsbridge. As Margaret, Duchess of Argyll, she remained a client.

After his death, Queen Elizabeth The Queen Mother remained a steadfast client, as did other older clients. In order to continue and revive the business John Tullis, a nephew of Edward Molyneux, designed for the House until the business was sold. A consortium headed by Manny Silverman, formerly of Moss Bros., acquired the company. Guest collections were designed by Gina Fratini and Murray Arbeid and the building was completely renovated under the direction of Michael Pick who brought back to life its original Art Moderne splendours. The famous glass chimney-piece forming the focal point of Lacoste's scheme leading on from the ground floor to the first floor salon with its faceted art moderne detailed mirror cladding and pilasters was returned by the V&A as the focal point of the grand mirrored salon. The house re-opened with an acclaimed collection designed by former Christian Dior designer Marc Bohan. The Gulf War and subsequent recession of the early 1990s killed the venture and the house closed its doors in 1992.

On 11 May 2005, the Norman Hartnell premises were commemorated with a blue plaque at 26 Bruton Street where he spent his working life from 1934 to 1979.

The Norman Hartnell name was acquired by Li & Fung as part of an extensive London fashion portfolio which includes Hardy Amies Ltd, acquired in 2008 by Fung Capital. Hardy Amies is now owned by No.14 Savile Row, which in turn is owned by Fung Capital, the private investment holding company of the Fung family also the controlling shareholders of publicly listed Li & Fung Limited and Trinity Limited. Various Norman Hartnell themed housewares have been produced and there are plans to further develop the brand.

Princess Beatrice also wore a dress designed for Queen Elizabeth II by Hartnell for her wedding in 2020.

== Personal life ==
Hartnell never married, but enjoyed a discreet and quiet life at a time when homosexual relations between men were illegal. He considered himself a confirmed bachelor, and his close friends were almost never in the public eye, nor did he ever do anything to compromise his position and business as a leading designer to both ladies of the British royal family and his aristocratic or 'society' clients upon whom his success was founded. He rarely socialised with any of them. The younger Hardy Amies, fellow designer for Queen Elizabeth II, was surprised to discover how much he enjoyed his company in Paris in 1959. They were both there during the State Visit to France to view their creations being worn. Hartnell had been known to term Amies 'Hardly Amiable'. In late years, long after Hartnell's death and in a more liberal climate, Amies became known for some ad lib remarks during interviews and in explaining his business success compared to Hartnell's near penury at the end, he more than once termed Hartnell a 'soppy' or 'silly old queen' whilst describing himself as a 'bitchy' or 'clever old queen.'

Hartnell had many women friends. His dresses were also worn by another Streatham resident of the past, ex-Tiller Girl Renee Probert-Price. A Hartnell evening ensemble features in the collection of vintage dresses inherited by Probert-Price's great-niece following her death in 2013.

== Filmography ==
Hartnell designed costumes for the following films (incomplete list):

- Such Is the Law (1930)
- Aunt Sally (1933)
- A Southern Maid (1933)
- That's a Good Girl (1933)
- Give Her a Ring (1934)
- Princess Charming (1934)
- The Church Mouse (1934)
- The Return of Bulldog Drummond (1934)
- Brewster's Millions (1935)
- Two's Company (1936)
- Jump for Glory (1937)
- Non-Stop New York (1937)
- Climbing High (1938)
- Sailing Along (1938)
- Design for Spring (1938)
- Making Fashion (1938)
- He Found a Star (1941) (dresses for Sarah Churchill and Evelyn Dall)
- Ships with Wings (1942)
- The Peterville Diamond (1942)
- This Was Paris (1942)
- The Demi-Paradise (1943)
- Maytime in Mayfair (1949)
- The Passionate Stranger (1957) (gowns for Margaret Leighton)
- Women in Love (1958) (TV)
- Suddenly, Last Summer (1959) (costumes for Katharine Hepburn)
- Never Put It in Writing (1964)
- The Beauty Jungle (1964)
- A Double in Diamonds (1967) (TV episode: The Saint)

== Theatre designs ==
Norman Hartnell first designed for the stage as a schoolboy before the First World War and went on to design for at least twenty-four varied stage productions, after his initial London success with a Footlights Revue, which brought him his first glowing press reviews.

== Cultural depictions ==
He is featured as a character in the first two seasons of the Netflix drama The Crown, portrayed by Richard Clifford.

== Honours ==
- He was made an Officer of the Ordre des Palmes académiques in 1939 by the French Republic.
- He was made a Member 4th Class of the Royal Victorian Order (MVO) in the 1953 Coronation Honours List.
- He was knighted as a Knight Commander of the Royal Victorian Order (KCVO) in the 1977 New Years Honours List.
- He received the Defence Medal for service in the Home Guard during World War II.
