= Hanly =

Hanly is an English surname. Notable people with the surname include:

- David Hanly (1944–2025), Irish writer and broadcaster
- Don Hanly (born 1954), Australian sprinter
- Frank Hanly (1863–1920), American politician, Governor of Indiana
- Gil Hanly (born 1934), New Zealand artist
- Joe Hanly (died 1996), Irish rower
- Kate Hanly (born 1993), Canadian long track speed skater
- Mick Hanly (born 1949), Irish singer and composer
- Pat Hanly (1932–2004), New Zealand painter
- Peter Hanly (born 1964), Irish actor
- Thomas Burton Hanly (1812–1880), American lawyer and politician who represented Arkansas in the Congress of the Confederate States
- Vincent Hanly (1899–1970), Irish Roman Catholic priest, Bishop of Elphin

== See also ==
- Hanley (name)
