= Ethel Salisbury Hanley =

American sportswoman

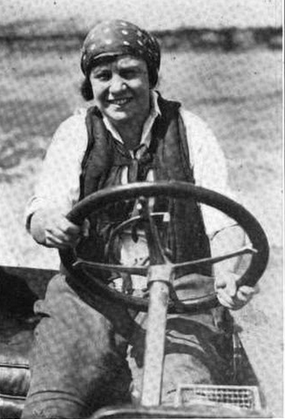
- Ethel Salisbury Hanley, from a 1922 publication
- Born: January 1, 1890; Fort Madison, Iowa, U.S.
- Died: August 20, 1949 (age 59); Muscatine, Iowa, U.S.
- Occupations: Speed boat racer, entertainer, puppeteer
- Relatives: Joe R. Hanley (brother-in-law)

Ethel E. Salisbury Hanley (January 1, 1890 – August 20, 1949) was an American speed boat racer, entertainer, actress, and puppeteer, described as "the foremost woman driver of hydroplanes in the world" in 1925, after she raced in Norway, England, and France.

== Early life and education ==
Hanley was born in Fort Madison, Iowa, the daughter of Charles Henry Salisbury and Amy Trickett Salisbury.

== Career ==
Hanley toured the United States as an entertainer, appearing on Chautauqua programs throughout the Midwest as a dramatic reader and puppeteer. She acted in plays in 1926, and as head of the Salisbury Players in 1929. She also taught public speaking, dramatics, and forensics in Muscatine public schools. She continued acting and was director and producer of the Salisbury Players into the 1940s. She toured with her marionette show in the 1940s.

Hanley and her husband Charles P. Hanley were speed boat racers. She set a world's record at Lake Pontchartrain in 1923 for boats in her class. In summer 1924, she competed in motorboat races in Norway, England, and France. She was the first woman driver to be a delegate to the National Motor Boat Show, representing the Mississippi Valley Power Boat Association in 1927. The Hanleys endorsed Valspar varnish in print advertisements.

== Personal life ==
Salisbury married lawyer Charles Palmer Hanley in 1916. His brother was Joe R. Hanley, lieutenant governor of New York. She died in 1949, at the age of 59, in Muscatine, Iowa. Her marionette shows continued to tour after her death.
