= Coronation gown of Elizabeth II =

Gown worn by Elizabeth II at her coronation in 1953

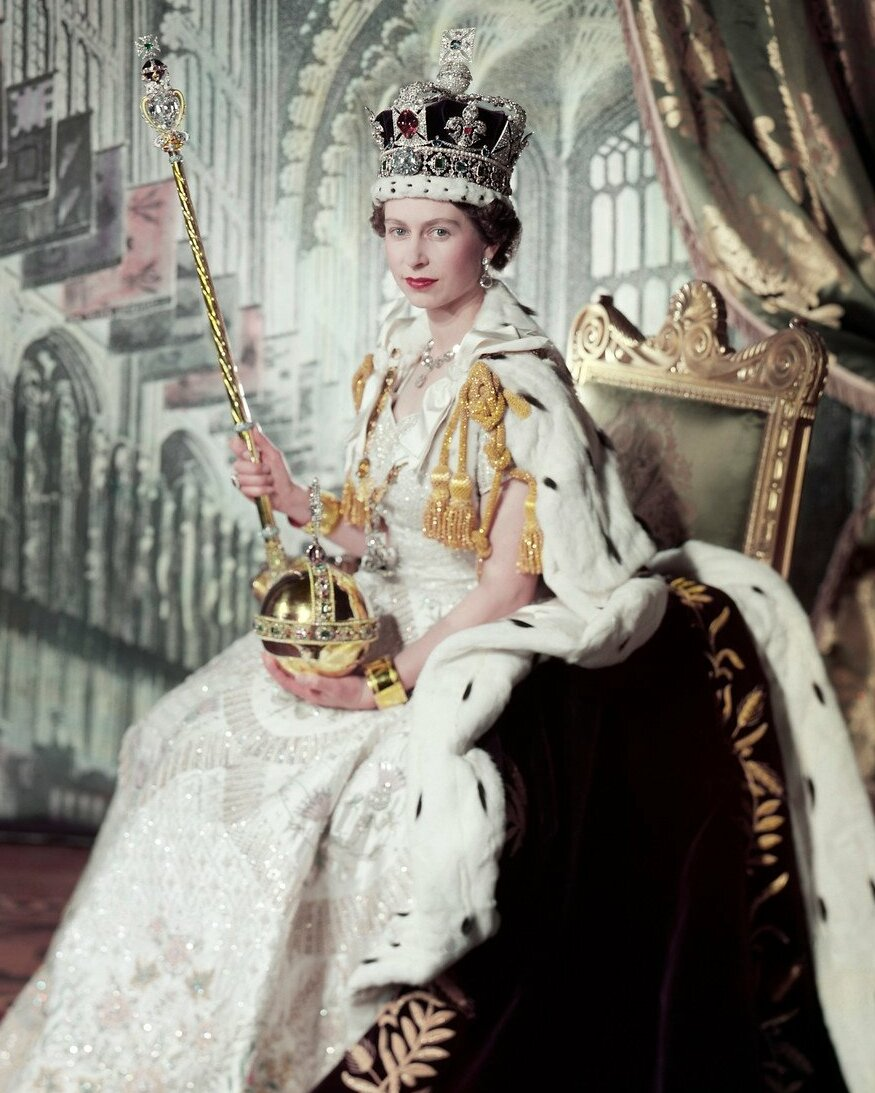
- Artist: Norman Hartnell
- Year: 1953

Queen Elizabeth II's coronation took place on 2 June 1953. Ordered in October 1952, her gown took eight months of research, design, workmanship, and intricate embroidery to complete. It featured the floral emblems of the countries of the United Kingdom and those of the other states within the Commonwealth of Nations, including the English Tudor rose, Scots thistle, Welsh leek, Irish shamrock, Canadian maple leaf, Australian wattle, New Zealand silver fern, South African protea, Indian lotus flower for India, the Lotus flower of Ceylon, and Pakistan's wheat, cotton, and jute.

The gown, like Elizabeth's wedding dress and other notable royal dresses of this period, was designed by Norman Hartnell. It was Elizabeth's wish that the coronation dress should be made of satin, like her wedding dress, with accentuation of regal elegance, but with no undue emphasis on shape. The gown now forms part of the Royal Collection.

After the coronation, the Queen wore the dress on several occasions such as when she opened the parliaments in New Zealand (1954), Australia (1954), Ceylon (1954), and Canada (1957).

== Design ==
The dress was to be a historic masterpiece befitting the occasion, consequently one that would stand out. Like her bridal gown, the costume was designed by Norman Hartnell. Hartnell proposed at least eight different designs; the first, very simple, similar to that worn by Queen Victoria at her coronation; the second, a modern slim-fitting sheath gown, embroidered in gold; the third, a crinoline style dress of white satin, silver tissue and crusty silver lace; the fourth, white satin embroidered with Madonna and arum lilies and encrusted with pendant pearls; the fifth, a colourful design of violets, roses and wheat, the sixth, white satin with gold, silver and copper embroideries featuring branches of oak leaves with acorns; the seventh, the Tudor Rose of England, appliqued in gold tissue against white satin; and the eighth, similar to the seventh, but incorporating the floral emblems of Great Britain. The Queen favoured the last option if Hartnell introduced some colour and included the floral emblems of the dominions, alongside those of Great Britain. When consulting with the Garter King of Arms, Hartnell's plan to use the daffodil to represent Wales was vetoed, with the Garter requiring the use of the leek instead. Hartnell described this event in his autobiography:

The leek I agreed was a most admirable vegetable, full of historic significance and doubtless of health-giving properties, but scarcely noted for its beauty. Could he not possibly permit me to use the more graceful daffodil instead? "No, Hartnell. You must have the Leek," said Garter, adamant.

However, Hartnell found that through the use of silk and the addition of diamonds, "we were able to transform the earthy Leek into a vision of Cinderella charm ... fit to embellish the dress of a queen". These changes were implemented in the ninth design and presented to Elizabeth at Sandringham. Later Hartnell secretly added an embroidered extra four-leaved shamrock on the left side of her dress as an omen for good fortune.

The final version featured a Tudor rose, embroidered in very pale pink silk, with pearls, gold and silver bullion, and rose diamante; the Welsh leek, embroidered in white silk with leaves of very pale green silk; the Scottish thistle, with pale mauve silk and amethysts and a calyx embroidered in reseda green silk, silver thread, and diamante dewdrops; the Irish shamrock, like the thistle, was embroidered in soft green silk, silver thread, bullion, and diamante; the Canadian maple leaf, made with green silk embroideries with a crystal vein and gold border; the silver fern of New Zealand, embroidered in straight stitches using soft green silk and veined in silver and crystal; the Australian wattle flower, made with a coarse mimosa yellow wool and green and gold foliage; the South African protea, embroidered in shaded pink silk, with green silk leaves and silver outlined petals; the lotus flower of India, made with seed pearls and diamante and mother of pearl embroidered petals; the Lotus flower of Ceylon, made with opals, mother of pearl, diamante, and soft green silk; and the three emblems of Pakistan: wheat, in oat-shaped diamante and fronds of golden crystal, cotton, made in silver with leaves of green silk, and jute, embroidered in green silk and golden thread.

In addition to the gown, Hartnell also designed a plain white linen robe called a colobium sindonis, which initially covered the short-sleeved, low-neck gown. Attached to the shoulders was a crimson velvet mantle edged with ermine and featuring two rows of delicately embroidered gold lace and gold filigree. On the Coronation Day, the six maids of honour carried this robe behind the Queen.

== Making ==
The dress, which was ordered in October 1952, took eight months of research, design and workmanship to make. Its intricate embroidery required many hours of diligent work by the dressmakers. The silk used to make the gown was obtained from Lady Hart Dyke's silk farm at Lullingstone Castle. The dress required the efforts of at least three dressmakers, six embroideresses and the Royal School of Needlework, responsible for the embroidery worked in gold bullion thread. The Robe of State of Crimson Velvet, which was attached to the shoulders of the gown, was hand-woven by Warners of Braintree, Essex, using Lullingstone Castle silk and made by Messrs. Ede & Ravenscroft of Chancery Lane, London.

== Gallery ==
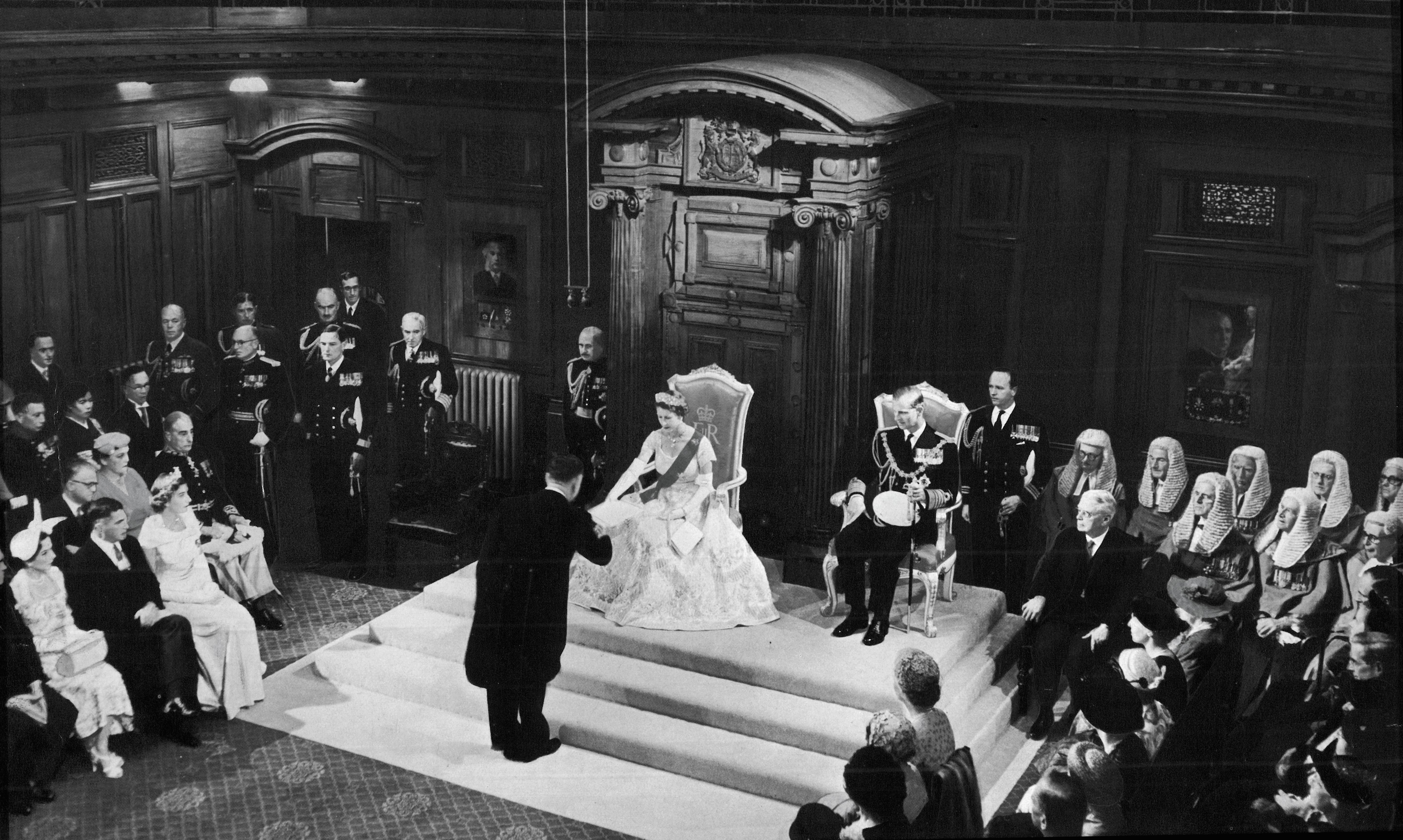
The Queen opening a session of the New Zealand Parliament on 12 January 1954 in the Legislative Council Chamber, Parliament House. She is wearing her coronation gown.

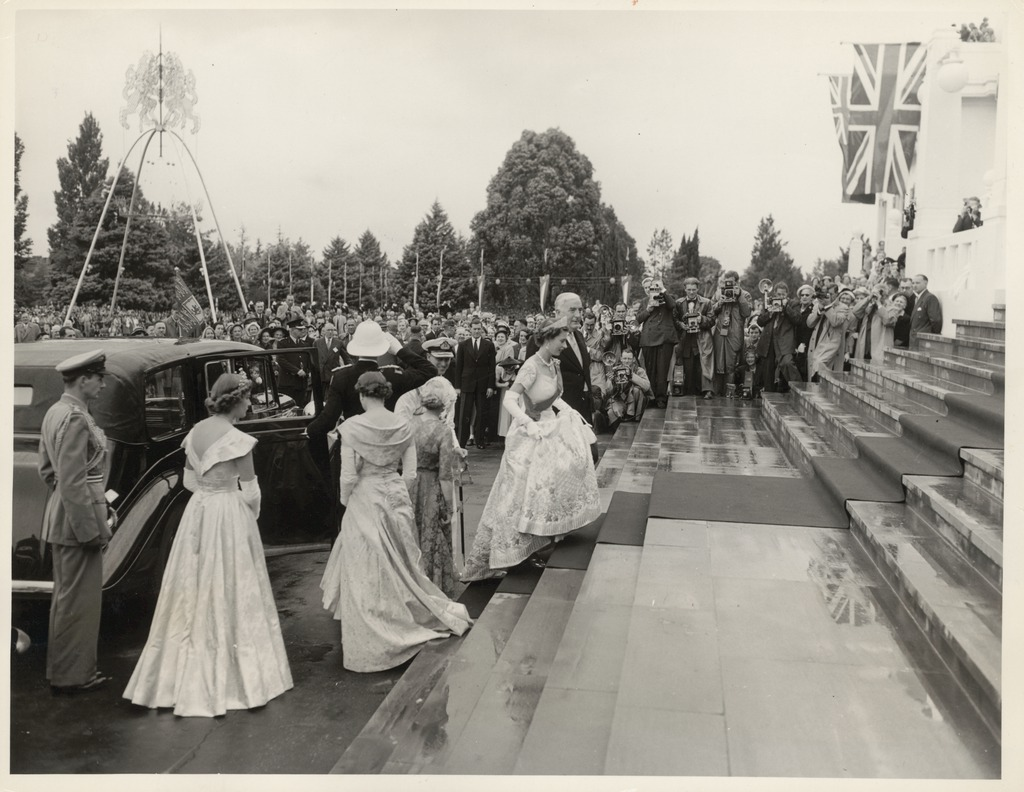
The Queen, wearing her coronation gown, arriving at Parliament House, Canberra to open the third session of the 20th Federal Parliament on 15 February 1954

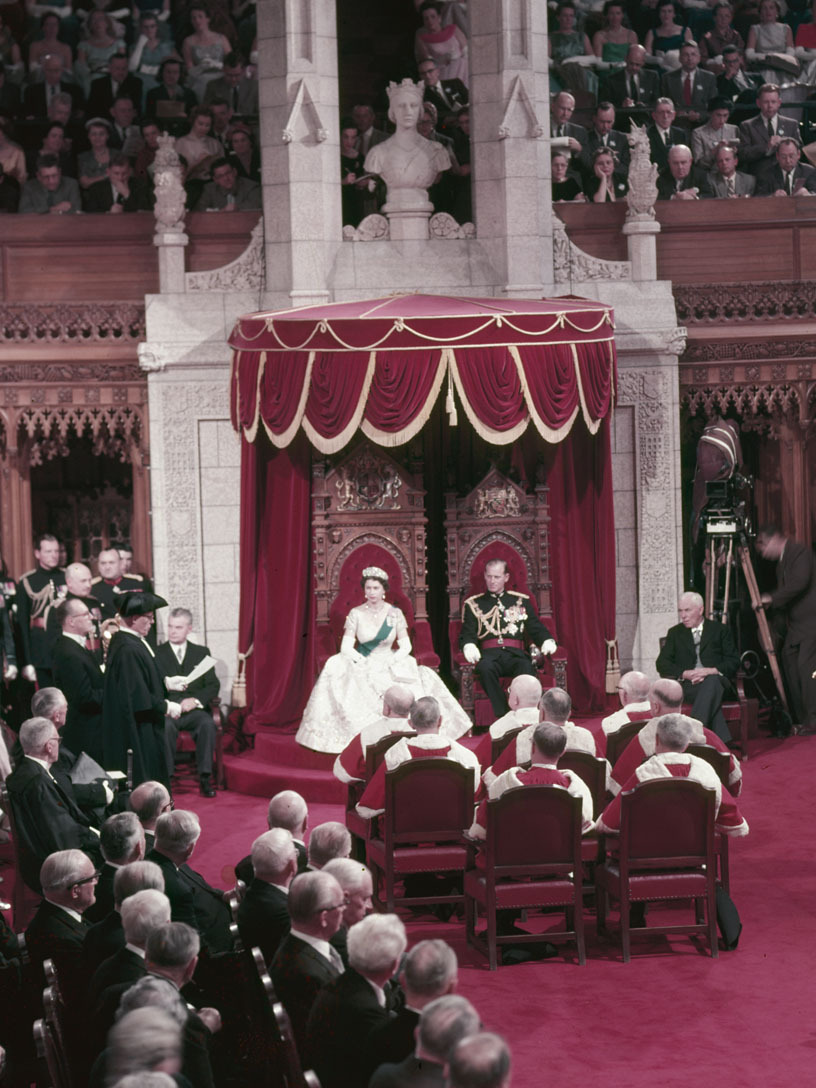
The Queen, wearing her coronation gown, and Prince Philip seated at their thrones, during the opening of the 23rd Canadian Parliament, 14 October 1957

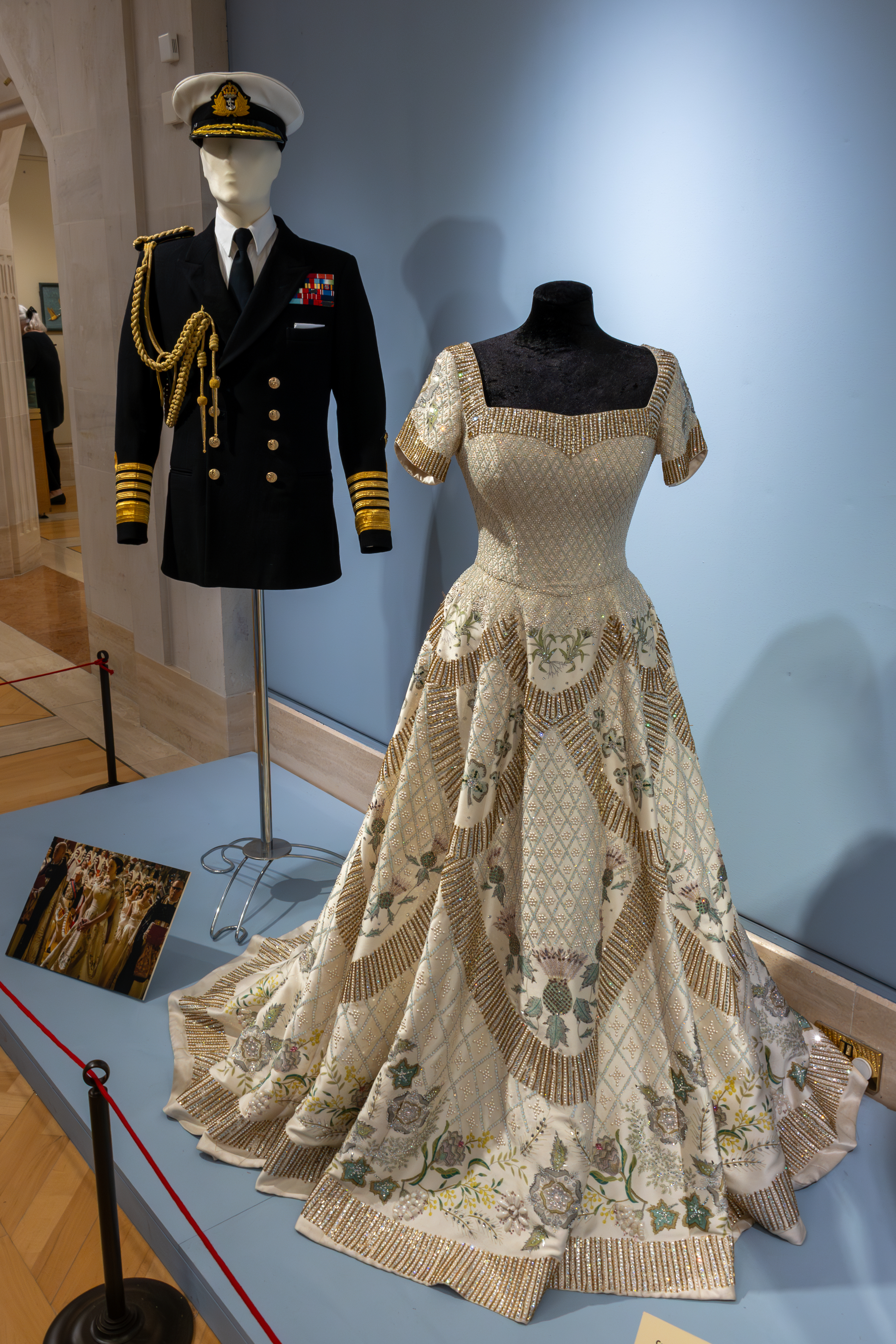
Replica of the gown created by Swarovski for the Queen's Diamond Jubilee in 2012, later used in the television series The Crown

== See also ==
- List of individual dresses
