= George Handley (footballer, born 1868) =

English footballer

Personal information
- Full name: George Handley
- Date of birth: 1868
- Place of birth: Burton on the Wolds, England
- Date of death: 1938 (aged 69–70)
- Position: Winger

Senior career*
Years	Team	Apps	(Gls)
1894–1895	Loughborough		
1895–1896	Notts County	1	(0)
1896–1897	Coalville Town		
1897–1899	Derby County	15	(2)
1899–1900	Northampton Town		
1900	Newark Town		
Total		16	(2)
- * Club domestic league appearances and goals

George Handley (1868–1938) was an English footballer who played in the Football League for Derby County and Notts County.
