= George Handley (footballer, born 1912) =

English footballer

Personal information
- Full name: George H. Handley
- Date of birth: 5 July 1912
- Place of birth: Wednesbury, England
- Date of death: 9 July 1943 (aged 31)
- Place of death: Sicily, Fascist Italy
- Height: 5 ft 8 in (1.73 m)
- Position: Inside forward

Senior career*
Years	Team	Apps	(Gls)
1931–1932	Hednesford Town	1	(0)
1933–1934	West Bromwich Albion	0	(0)
1934–1935	Crystal Palace	5	(0)
1935	Brierley Hill Alliance		
1936–1939	Darlaston		

International career
1933–1934	English Amateurs	1	(0)
- * Club domestic league appearances and goals

George H. Handley (5 July 1912 – 9 July 1943) was an English professional footballer who played as an inside forward in the Football League for Crystal Palace.

== Football career ==
Handley began his football career in September 1931 with Hednesford Town. He soon came to the attention of West Bromwich Albion, for which he signed in June 1932. Despite playing many matches in the reserves and being capped at the amateur level for England, Handley never appeared for the first team at West Brom. Transferred to Crystal Palace in 1934, he played 5 matches in the Football League Third Division South before being signed by Brierley Hill Alliance the next season. Handley's next and final club was Darlaston, where he played until the outbreak of the Second World War in 1939.

== Personal life ==
Handley was married. He served as a lance corporal in the 2nd (Airborne) Battalion of the South Staffordshire Regiment during the Second World War and was killed during the invasion of Sicily on 9 July 1943. Handley's body was never recovered, and he is commemorated on the Cassino Memorial.

== Career statistics ==
Appearances and goals by club, season and competition
Club	Season	League			Cup		Total	
Club	Season	Division	Apps	Goals	Apps	Goals	Apps	Goals
Crystal Palace	1934–35	Third Division South	5	0	0	0	5	0
Career total			5	0	0	0	5	0
