= George B. Handley =

American academic

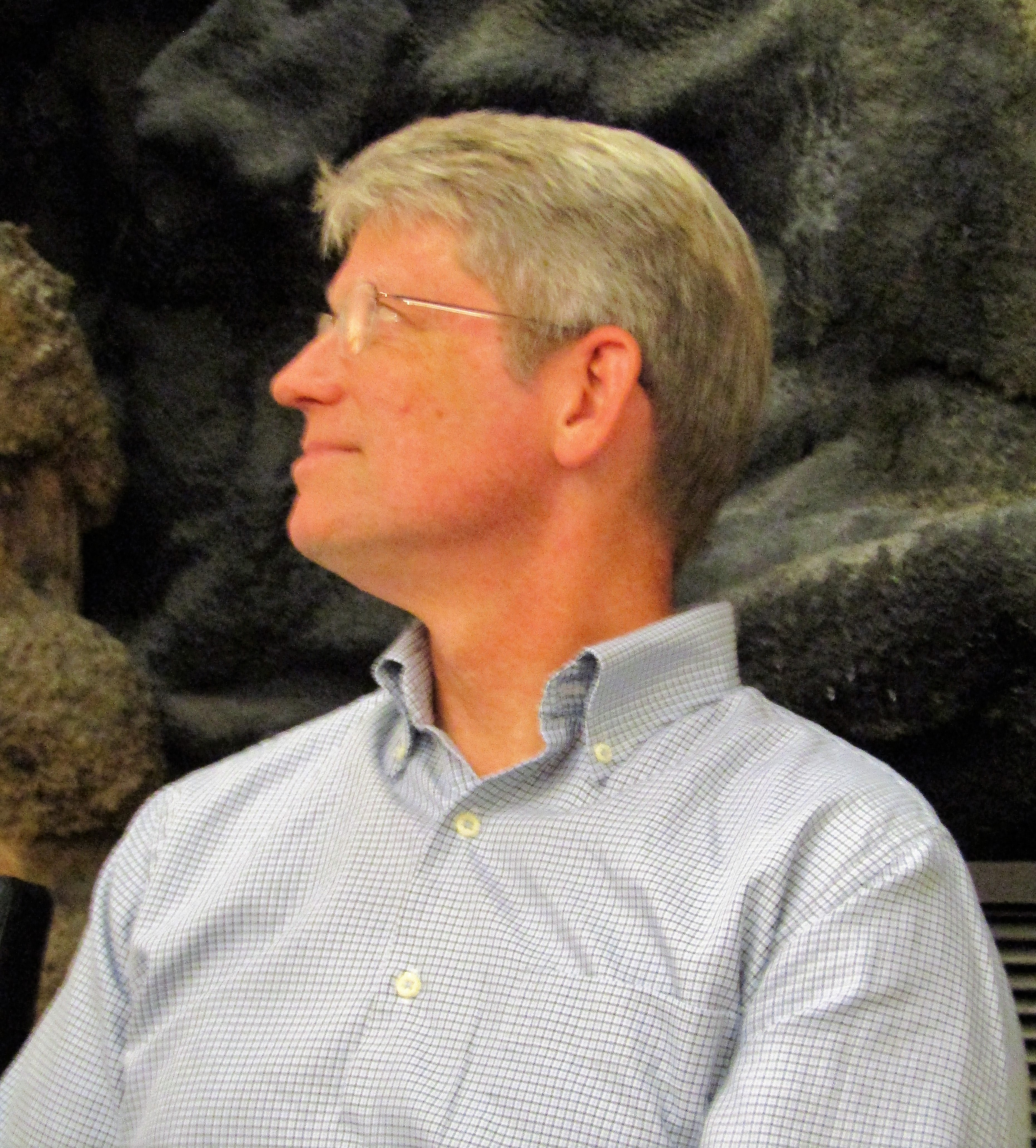
- George Handley in 2018

26th President of the Association for the Study of Literature and Environment
- Incumbent
- Assumed office 2022 Co-leader with Gisela Heffes
- Preceded by: Laura Barbas-Rhoden; Bethany Wiggin

Personal details
- Citizenship: American
- Spouse: Amy Handley
- Children: 4
- Education: MA, PhD
- Alma mater: University of California, Berkeley
- Profession: Academician

George Browning Handley is a professor of humanities at Brigham Young University (BYU) who has often written on issues related to environmentalism.

== Early life ==
Handley was raised in Connecticut, United States.

== Education ==
Handley has a bachelor's degree from Stanford University and a masters and PhD from the University of California, Berkeley.

== Career ==
He taught at Northern Arizona University before joining the BYU faculty in 1998. He also served as chair of BYU's department of humanities, classics and comparative literature.

== Works ==
Handley's works have focused on the interaction of culture and the physical environment. His most cited work is Caribbean Literature and the Environment: Between Nature and Culture co-authored with Elizabeth M. DeLoughrey.

Among other works by Handley are Home Waters: A Year of Recompenses on the Provo River (Salt Lake City: University of Utah Press, 2010), New World Poetics: Nature and the Adamic Imagination of Whitman, Neruda, and Walcott (Athens, Georgia: University of Georgia Press, 2007), Stewardship and Creation: LDS Perspectives on the Environment and Postslavery Literatures in the Americas: Family Portraits in Black and White (Charlottesville: University Press of Virginia, 2000).

== Religion ==
Handley is a member of the Church of Jesus Christ of Latter-day Saints (LDS Church). In the LDS Church he has served as a bishop and counselor in a stake presidency.

== Personal life ==
Handley and his wife Amy are the parents of four children. The family lives in Provo, Utah.
