= Marianne (Mary Ann) Titus v. Elijah Mitchell, Alexander J. Fields =

Freedom Suit

Marianne (Mary Ann) Titus v. Elijah Mitchell, Alexander J. Fields (1832–1833) was a legal case in which Marianne's mother, Lydia Titus, petitioned for her freedom in St. Louis County, Missouri. This was one of many freedom suits that involved the Titus family. Lydia Titus was declared in the early 1820s as a Free Person of Color (FPOC), whereas all of her children were considered enslaved due to the state's statutes on slavery.

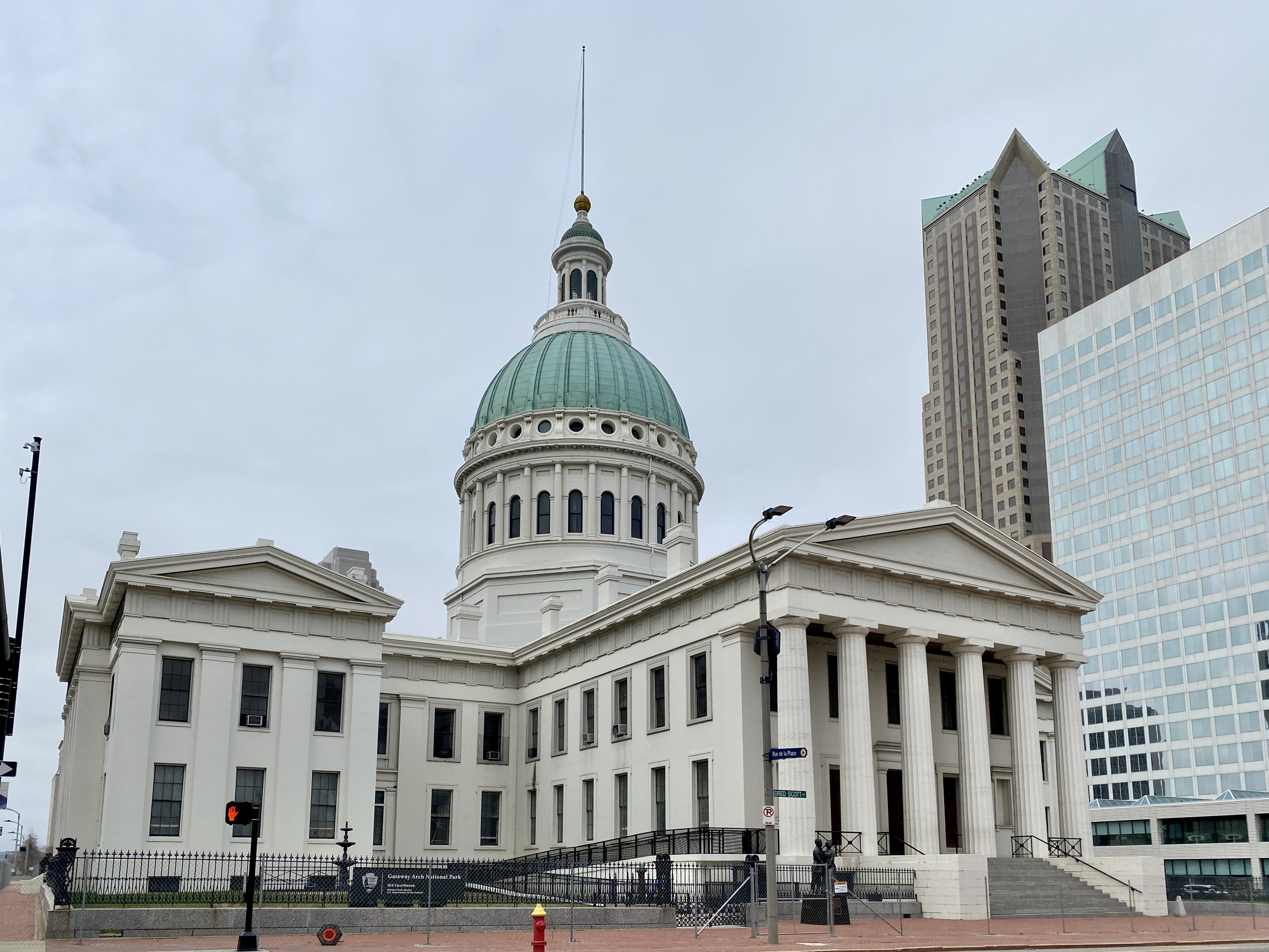
The Old Courthouse of St. Louis County, MO; Where Marianne Titus fought for her freedom.

== Background ==
Lydia Titus (Marianne's mother) was abducted by Alexander J. Fields, with the assistance of Elijah Mitchell, to the state of Missouri to be enslaved. Titus was forced to work on Field's plantation for years afterward. Titus petitioned for her freedom four times while living on the border of Missouri and Illinois, where she was first enslaved in 1807, after being detained on the Missouri River. Titus secured her freedom in Illinois in 1810, and her legal victories set a precedent for subsequent cases. Even though she was born a free woman in the state of Illinois. She then petitioned for the freedom of her four children throughout the 1830s to secure their citizenship as free Black people.

Although Lydia was considered an FPOC, her daughter, Marianne, was considered enslaved. Before her freedom suit, she was owned by Elisha Mitchell and was forced to provide labor to his plantation. Marianne's mother claimed that Mitchell moved to Illinois in 1807, taking her with him. After the death of Elisha Mitchell, Titus sued his wife and was granted freedom from his widow, since she was the administrator of the estate. Marianne testified that Lydia stayed in Illinois and had more children. The family stated they lived out their lives without fear of slavery and uninterrupted freedom. Following the kidnapping of Lydia, Field and Mitchell threatened Marianne's life by possibly jeopardizing her freedom back into slavery.

== Original Proceedings ==
There were over eight suits that were filed against Field and Mitchell, all of which were from the Titus family. All three men were subjected to prove that Lydia Titus was born a slave, making all her children and grandchildren enslaved as well. Both defense and prosecution agreed that the judgment of the rulings would fall under one case: Marianne Titus's. In which the decision upon her case would determine the freedom of her and her siblings.

Missouri, which fell under slave state statutes, allowed slaves to sue as lower-class individuals. In these cases, the state would provide a public defender for the enslaved people. According to the prosecution, Field was allegedly armed and drew a firearm on Lydia during her kidnapping. An East St. Louis resident (Nathan Cole) testified that he tried to pursue Titus during her kidnapping, but Field was quick to threaten to harm him. Prosecution then called Ichabod Badgley to the stand, where his testimony dissolved the defense's main argument. After the observation of presenting evidence from Titus' original suit in 1810 and 1825, Marianne Titus was in fact, born a free woman.

== Freedom Suits and Slaves as Plaintiffs ==
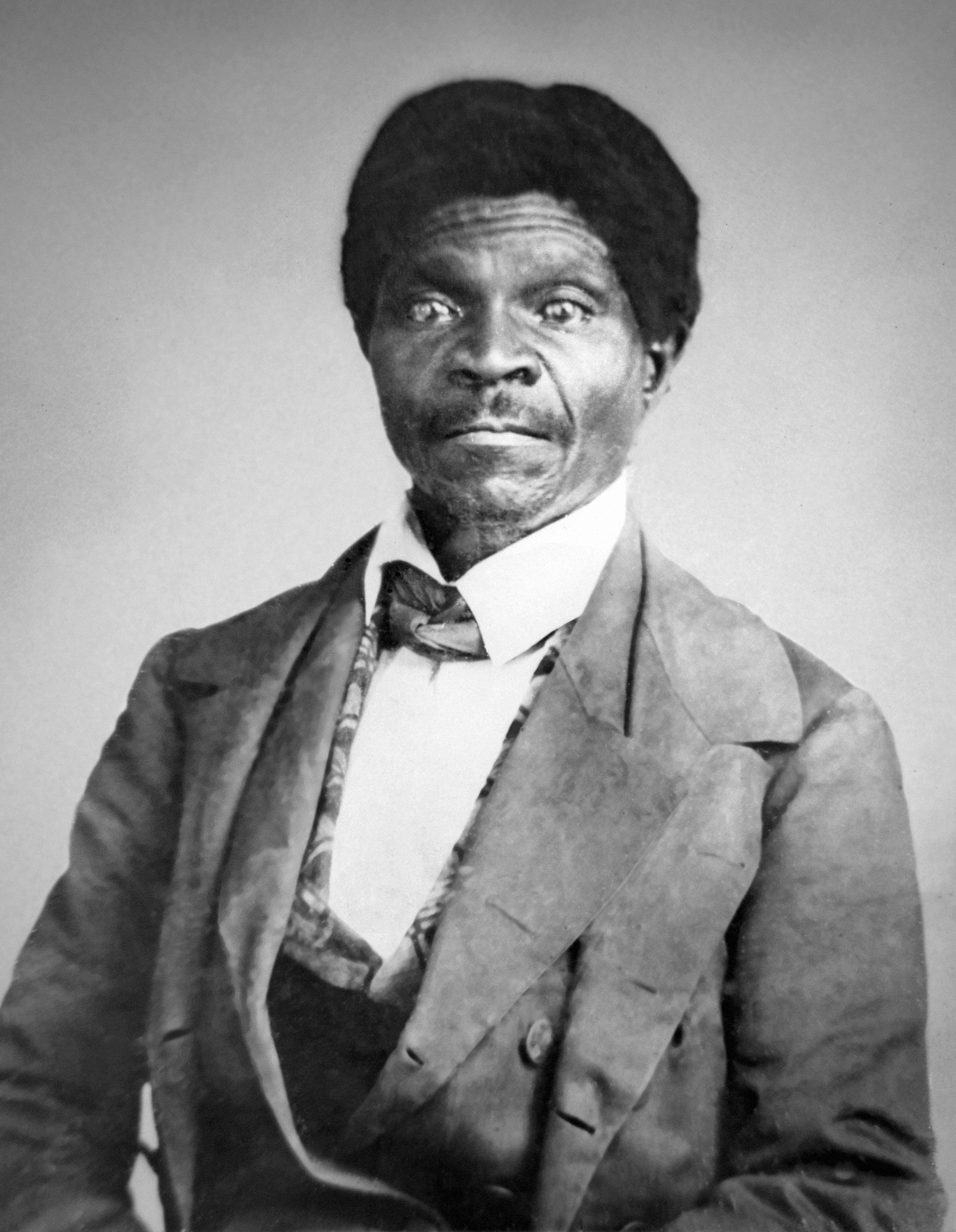
Dred Scott, an enslaved man famous for suing for his family's freedom. Unlike the Titus family, he was unsuccessful.

The Titus family made a name for themselves by suing for their freedom in Antebellum America, they were not the only ones. Nearly 300 enslaved individuals fought and sued for their liberty, such as Dred Scott, Elizabeth Freeman, and Elizabeth Key. But yet, only a handful succeeded in their legal proceedings. In 1807, Missouri allowed slaves to advocate for their freedom through these freedom suits. Missouri obtained inspiration from Virginia's statutes regarding freedom suits. But, Missouri's loophole surrounded the criminality of the enslaved, including battery, assault, theft, and murder. And the ruling of their freedom case would be determined by their criminal history. Freedom suits would be carried out like many modern cases, with witnesses, evidence, and even the occasional jury. But like many early-century cases, they lack an abundance of records for these proceedings. Including evidence, testimonies, transcripts, and any other key elements for the court of law.

In cases such as these, slaves as plaintiffs were more common than not. Many literary works of those who were enslaved describe the brutal reality of slavery. Yet, they highlight the economic benefits they supplied to the upper class in the Antebellum era. These proceedings and literature provided structure on how enslaved African Americans were deprived of their rights in their petition for freedom. These cases were brought before the courts on grounds of wrongful enslavement, breaches of agreements, and promises of freedoms (through wills and contracts). Plaintiffs would often rely on the sympathy of white citizens, who would later be their attorneys, witnesses, and jury. The implications surrounding these cases placed a large emphasis on the line drawn between morality and the law. Leaving many limited victories, but highlighting the resistance the resilience of the enslaved.

== Opinion of the Court ==
In the case of Marianne Titus v. Elijah Mitchell, Alexander J. Fields, the state concluded that Marianne Titus was a free person of color (FPOC) in May of 1833. The courts found that Lydia Titus was, in fact, a free woman from birth, and that Missouri law could not take that privilege away. Meaning that Marianne Titus, was a free woman. With this ruling, Marianne was awarded $250, yet there is no documentation to prove of this settlement. The Titus family was freed from slavery. The court decided on the verdict from the case of Winny v. Phebe Whitesides, a Missouri Supreme Court case, that implemented the doctrine of "once free, always free". Marianne Titus then returned to the Titus family homestead in St. Clair County, Missouri. The Titus family freedom suits have limited documentation and evidence of the trial and premonitions. Yet, their stories of liberty and abolition live on in legal history to demonstrate the power of advocacy and how simple it is to strip liberty from those who once possessed it.
