= Marguerite Scypion =

Enslaved American (c.1770s – after 1836)

Marguerite Scypion, also known in court files as Marguerite, (c.1770s – after 1836) was an African-Natchez woman, born into slavery in St. Louis, then located in New Spain. She was held first by Joseph Tayon and later by Jean Pierre Chouteau, one of the most powerful men in the city.

In 1805, two years after St. Louis came under US rule, Marguerite filed the first "freedom suit" in the city's circuit court, 41 years before Dred Scott and his wife Harriet filed their better-known case. In November 1836, Marguerite, her children, her sister, and other descendants of Marie Jean Scypion, her mother, finally won their case as free people of color. The unanimous jury decision in their favor was based on their maternal descent from a Natchez woman, as Indian slavery had been ended by the Spanish in 1769. The trial venue was moved to Jefferson County because the Chouteau family was influential in St. Louis. The decision withstood appeals to the state and the United States Supreme Court in 1838. The case was considered to end Indian slavery in Missouri.

Throughout their struggle, Marguerite and her two sisters argued that their mother, Marie Jean Scypion, had been illegally enslaved after 1769 because, after the Spanish started ruling the area, the colonial governor abolished Indian slavery in the Louisiana Territory to make regional policy consistent with other Spanish colonies. Since her mother was Natchez, Marie Jean Scypion was legally free. Thus, her descendants born after that date were also free, as they were born to a free mother. Although an 1806 Louisiana Territorial Supreme Court ruling decided against the Scypion descendants, they did not give up their desire for freedom.

Following the passage of a new law in 1824 protecting enslaved people's right to sue against illegal enslavement, the women and their children renewed their petitions. In 1826, Marguerite Scypion, her children, and her two sisters filed separate suits against their masters. One of the Scypion sisters and some of their descendants died before the cases were decided. The court combined the suits under the name of Marguerite (free woman of color) for the final trial. She and the other descendants of Marie Jean Scypion finally achieved freedom in 1836.

== Early life ==
Scypion was the third daughter born into slavery in St. Louis to Marie Jean Scypion, an enslaved woman. Marie Jean Scypion's mother was Natchez and had been captured and sold into slavery during the Indian wars. Her father was an enslaved Black person. Marguerite's sisters were Celeste and Catiche. Their father was not identified. Joseph Tayon and his wife Marie Louise enslaved the mother and daughters. After the two Tayon daughters married, Marie Louise Tayon assigned Celeste to Helene (Tayon) Chevalier and Catiche to Marie Louise (Tayon) Chauvin.

== History ==
The Mississippi Valley area had a complex history under succeeding French and Spanish colonial rules, which affected slavery case law developed by the later United States after the Louisiana Purchase. The Spanish took over this area in 1763 when France conceded this territory to them following defeat by Great Britain in the Seven Years' War. The Spanish territorial governor in 1769 prohibited Indian slavery in the area to make the policy and law consistent with other Spanish-controlled colonies.

Faced with protests by powerful slaveholders, however, the government allowed the retention of enslaved Native Americans while the Crown reviewed the issue. It forbade any sales of such enslaved people. The Tayon family struggled internally over enslaving people; in about 1799, the father, Joseph Tayon, wanted to sell Scypion and her daughters, but his daughters Helene Chevalier and Marie Louise Chauvin tried to protect their servants and reminded him of their Indian ancestry, which prohibited their sale. The daughters refused to give him custody of the two mixed-race women, saying that their mother (Mrs. Tayon) had given the sisters to them. After his wife's death, the widower Tayon accepted the invitation of Jean Pierre Chouteau, a wealthy merchant and fur trader, to join his household. He took with him the slaves Marie Jean Scypion and her daughter Marguerite, together with the latter's children. Marie Jean was half African-Natchez descent.

By the time of the 1803 annexation of the area into the US by the Louisiana Purchase, numerous residents of territorial Missouri still held as slaves people who were descendants of Indians. In 1804, the Missouri Territory established slave laws, generally following US state and territorial models. Officials struggled to establish the legal basis for who should be considered enslaved, especially concerning the area's preceding French and Spanish law. It classified as mulatto those mixed-race persons with one-quarter (equivalent to one grandparent) or more African ancestry. This classification as mulatto restricted the rights of such persons who were free people of color. The Tayon family continued to struggle; in the spring of 1804, the sisters Mrs. Chevalier and Mrs. Chauvin filed legal documents that declared that Celeste and Catiche were free women of color to forestall their father's planned sale of the people they enslaved.

Three years after the death of the matriarch Marie Jean Scypion, Marguerite Scypion, in 1805, filed a freedom suit against François Tayon, who had inherited her after his father died. In October 1805, Marguerite's sisters Celeste and Catiche filed for writs of habeas corpus in the Superior Territorial Court, supported by affidavits from Chevalier and Chauvin saying that the women lived in their households voluntarily as free women of color. The court freed Celeste and Catiche. François Tayon opposed Marguerite's suit, but the court ordered him to release her, as well.

Scypion's daughters asserted that because their maternal grandmother Marie was a Natchez, her daughter Marie Jean Scypion was legally free under the 1769 Spanish proclamation. Scypion's status meant that her (three) daughters and their descendants were also legally free people of color, by the principle of partus sequitur ventrem. Incorporated into slavery case law in the United States since 1662 in the Virginia Colony, the principle of partus held that that of the mother determined the children's legal status.

The opposing lawyers argued Marie Jean's daughters should be classified as simply of African descent (and thus legally enslaved), as they had a black grandfather and were considered mulatto under Missouri law. This was an application of a hypodescent rule that disregarded their Native American ancestry. Although the Territorial Court initially ruled in favor of Marguerite and her two sisters, the decision was reversed by a higher court.

For 30 years, Scypion's descendants were enslaved and persisted in their suits for freedom. They finally succeeded in 1836, but some family members had already died. (See Renewal of suits, below.)

== Descendants ==
- Marguerite had several children: Antoine, Baptiste, Michael, and François. Their father was not identified.
- Celeste's children were Auguste, Paul, Antoine, and Sophie. Sophie's children Edward and William were also party to the suits.
- Catiche's children were Helen, Joseph, Julie, and Camelite. After 1825, Camelite's daughter Mary was also covered in the suits.

== Renewal of suits ==
In December 1824, the Missouri General Assembly passed a law providing for enslaved persons to have the legal standing as "free poor persons" to sue for freedom and protect them through the process. It provided that when the court agreed there was a basis for the freedom suit, it would assign counsel, who would institute an action for "trespass, assault and battery, and false imprisonment" against the master. The Scypion descendants filed several suits before settling their cases, but only the chief ones will be covered here.

In 1825, Marguerite Scypion renewed her case and sued as a free woman of color, with Pierre Barribeau acting as "next friend" for legal standing in the freedom suit. By this time, she had been sold to Pierre Chouteau, Sr., and she filed against him in the St. Louis Circuit Court. The court assigned the following attorneys: Farris, Hamilton Rowan Gamble (future chief justice of the State Supreme Court and governor of the state), and Isaac McGirk. (His brother Mathias McGirk became a justice of the State Supreme Court in the 1820s).

In this suit, Marguerite accused Chouteau of assault and false imprisonment for his continuing to hold her and her children in slavery. She sued for $500 in damages as a free woman of color based on the illegal enslavement of her mother, who was of Natchez maternal ancestry. Although the judgment and appeal to the Missouri Supreme Court initially went against Marguerite and her sisters, the case was reviewed in 1834, and a new trial was ordered.

Because of the political and economic prominence of the extended Chouteau family in St. Louis, Marguerite's attorneys requested a change of venue, which the court granted. The case of Celeste and her children against the Chevaliers and Catiche's surviving children against the Chauvins were rolled into the suit so that all were decided at once. The venue was set first for St. Charles County and then moved to Jefferson County before the case finally came to trial on November 8, 1836. Once the jury heard the case, they decided unanimously in favor of the Scypion descendants, a decision that withstood appeals up to the State Supreme Court and the US Supreme Court in 1838. All the descendants of Marie Jean Scypion were freed by this decision, and the case was considered to end Indian slavery in Missouri officially.

== Legacy ==
The Scypion daughters' persistence won their families' freedom and ended Indian slavery in Missouri.

== See also ==
- Polly Berry
- Lucy Ann Delaney
- Elizabeth Key Grinstead
- List of slaves
