= Tarpley =

Tarpley is a surname. Notable people with the name include:

- A. J. Tarpley, American football player
- Brenda Tarpley, American singer
- Collin S. Tarpley, American judge
- Gordon Tarpley, American musician
- Lindsay Tarpley, American soccer player
- Roy Tarpley, American basketball player
- Stephen Tarpley, American baseball player
- Thomas M. Tarpley, American Major General
- Webster Tarpley, American historian, economist, journalist, and lecturer

== Other uses ==
- Tarpley carbine
- Tarpley, Texas, an unincorporated community in Bandera County.
- Tarpley, William, a manager of Truth, Justice, and the American way.
