= Harry v. Decker & Hopkins =

1818 freedom suit in Mississippi

Harry v. Decker & Hopkins (1818) was a freedom suit in which the Supreme Court of Mississippi ruled that the three slaves in the case were freed based on prior residence in the Northwest Territory, established as free in 1787. Mississippi's court was the first in the South to rule on this issue and created a precedent in transit cases that was widely observed by slave state courts.

In response to a challenge related to Virginia having ceded this territory and the defendant asserting this protected the status of slavery in the region, the court held that any state may, through its constitution, prohibit slavery within its boundaries, and also through its legislature (as Indiana had done), when not constrained by the United States Constitution. Specifically, it recognized that slaves residing in the Northwest Territory became freemen per congressional passage of the Ordinance of 1787, which prohibited slavery in the territory, and could assert their rights in the state of Mississippi's courts.

== Background ==
In 1784, the Virginian John Decker moved with his slave Harry and two others to Vincennes (in present-day Indiana, then unorganized and west of the states of the United States; it was French territory that was conceded to Great Britain following the Seven Years' War). Britain ceded it to the United States following the American Revolutionary War. Following settlement of a claim by colonial Virginia and its cession to the US, this area was included by Congress in the Northwest Territory by the Ordinance of 1787, which established it as a free territory. The Indiana state constitution, ratified on 29 June 1816 and confirming the abolition of slavery, went into effect in July 1816.

Upon reaching Mississippi with Decker in 1816, Harry and the other two slaves filed a joint freedom suit, based on the fact that anti-slavery provisions in the Northwest Ordinance and the Indiana state constitution established the territory and state as free. Decker argued that the treaty of cession between Virginia and the United States following the Revolutionary War, ending the state's colonial claim to this territory, protected existing slavery under the earlier French law in the region. Decker asserted that the Indiana Constitution could not end slavery in the state as it would violate that treaty of cession. Decker believed that the Northwest Ordinance could be used to free only those slaves who were brought into the territory after 1787, the year it was passed.

== Decision ==
The Supreme Court of Mississippi agreed that the treaty of cession protected the property of settlers living in the Northwest region by preserving French law, at the time of cession of the territory to the United States. This was superseded by congressional passage of the Ordinance of 1787. In the court's opinion, to view the ordinance otherwise would, "defeat the great object of the general government," and be, "inadmissible upon every principle of legal construction." In addition, they opined that, "Slavery is condemned by reason, and the laws of nature. It exists and can exist only through municipal regulations." Therefore, they ruled the three slaves were free due to having been held in the Northwest Territory after passage of the Ordinance establishing it as free.

Mississippi and other slave states continued to support freedom for slaves in transit cases in which they had resided in free territories or states. By contrast, the Illinois Supreme Court and its lower courts "uniformly decided against the right of freedom" in transit cases, holding this more stringent position until 1845. Illinois had also been part of the Northwest Territory and was admitted as a free state.

== See also ==
- American slave court cases
- List of slaves
