= Hinds v. Brazealle =

1838 freedom suit in Mississippi

Hinds v. Brazealle (1838) was a freedom suit decided by the Supreme Court of Mississippi, which denied the legality in Mississippi of deeds of manumission executed by Elisha Brazealle, a Mississippi resident, in Ohio to free a slave woman and their son. Hinds ruled that Brazealle was trying to evade Mississippi law against manumissions except when authorized by the state legislature, and the actions were invalid. Both the mother and son were declared legally still slaves in Mississippi, and the son was prohibited from inheriting his father's estate, as Brazealle had left it all to him.

== Background ==
In 1826 Elisha Brazealle traveled from Mississippi to Ohio with a female slave and their mulatto son John Munroe Brazealle. He intended to emancipate both the woman and his son and return with them to Mississippi. During their stay in Ohio, Elisha executed a deed of emancipation for the mother and son, and returned to his residence in Jefferson County, Mississippi. In his will, Elisha reiterated his execution of emancipation for the two and left all of his property to his son John Munroe Brazealle. After his executors took charge of his estate, his relatives contested the will. They claimed that John Munroe Brazealle was still a slave and that slaves could not inherit property.

== Decision ==
Chief Justice William Sharkey said that the deed of manumission was executed by a citizen of Mississippi in Ohio for the exclusive purpose of evading Mississippi statutes prohibiting the owners of slaves to set them free without an act of legislature. The deed was therefore fraudulent in Mississippi and became null and void. He ruled that John Monroe Brazealle and his mother were legally slaves in Mississippi and were prohibited from inheriting Brazealle's estate.

== Reception ==
In the 1860 edition of his memoir, escaped slave James Watkins gives a short summary of this case under the headline "Horrible Statement".

In Frances Harper's 1892 novel Iola Leroy, or Shadows Uplifted, the principal character is the daughter of a Mississippi planter, who manumitted a slave who had nursed him through a near-fatal illness and then married her in Ohio. After the planter's sudden death, his relatives successfully contest the manumission and reduce Iola and her mother to slavery.

== See also ==
- American slave court cases
- List of slaves
