= List of court cases in the United States involving slavery =

The following is a list of court cases in the United States concerning slavery. See also "Judicial Cases Concerning American Slavery and the Negro," Helen Tunnicliff Catterall ed. (Washington, Carnegie Institute, 1929-1937) 5 vols.

Date	Case	Court	Ruling
1768-1770	Slew v. Whipple	Superior Court of Judicature in Salem, Massachusetts	Jenny Slew of Ipswich lived as a free woman for more than four decades before she was kidnapped and enslaved by John Whipple Jr. She sued twice and eventually won her freedom, as well as 4 pounds damages, on the basis that her mother was a free white woman (her father was an enslaved Black man.)
1768-1770	Muzzy v. Margaret	Massachusetts General Court	Margaret Tulip of Lexington was detained and re-enslaved by William Muzzy, also of Lexington. Margaret won her case on appeal and Muzzy had to pay 4 pounds damages.
1779	Brakkee v. Lovell	Vermont Superior Court	Pompey Brakkee had been held as a slave by Elijah Lovell after slavery was made illegal in Vermont. Lovell failed to appear and Brakkee was awarded 400 pounds sterling.
1781	Brom and Bett v. Ashley	Berkshire County Court of Common Pleas	Slaves Brom and Bett (Elizabeth Freeman) were freed on the basis that the Massachusetts constitution provided that "all men are born free and equal." This case was a precedent for the following one.
1781	Quock Walker v. Jennison	Worcester County Court of Common Pleas	Jennison's slave, Quock Walker, was found to be a freedman on the basis that slavery was contrary to the Bible and the Massachusetts Constitution.
1783	Commonwealth v. Jennison	Massachusetts Supreme Judicial Court	In the last of three cases involving Quock Walker, Jennison was prosecuted for assaulting him and offered the defense that Walker was a runaway slave. Justice William Cushing instructed the jury that "slavery is in my judgment as effectively abolished as it can be by the granting of rights and privileges wholly incompatible and repugnant to its existence." The jury convicted Jennison, thereby confirming that Walker was a free man.
1792	Guardian of Sally v. Beatty	Supreme Court of South Carolina	A slave owned by Beatty had bought a slave girl Sally and manumitted her. Chief Justice John Rutledge instructed the jury that such an act of generosity on Sally's behalf should not be overturned.
1806	Hudgins v. Wright	Virginia Supreme Court	Jackey Wright and her two children were freed based on her claim of maternal descent from Native American women. Indian slavery had been prohibited in Virginia since 1705.
1818	Harry v. Decker & Hopkins	Supreme Court of Mississippi	Decker's slave Harry was freed, and slaves residing in the Northwest Territory become free as per the Ordinance of 1787, and may assert their rights in court.
1820	Polly v. Lasselle	Supreme Court of Indiana	Indiana gave freedom to blacks in the state who had been held as slaves in the territory prior to Indiana's state constitutional ban on slavery.
1824	Winny v. Whitesides	Supreme Court of Missouri	This set a precedent that enslaved people became free if their owners established residence in free territory. The ruling upheld that once freed under such conditions, they remained free even if returned to slave states, engendering the phrase "once free, always free."
1830	North Carolina v. Mann	Supreme Court of North Carolina	Slaveowners were ruled to have absolute authority over their slaves and could not be found guilty of committing violence against them.
1834	Rachel v. Walker	Supreme Court of Missouri	A freedom suit of Rachel, a slave who sued for freedom from John Walker in the Supreme Court of Missouri, and won based on his having held her in the free state of Illinois.
1834	North Carolina v. Negro Will	Supreme Court of North Carolina	Judge William Gaston held that slaves who killed their owner or overseer in self-defense could not be found guilty of murder, but at most manslaughter (cf. North Carolina v. Mann (1830) above)
1836	Commonwealth v. Aves	Massachusetts Supreme Judicial Court	A slave named Med was freed on the grounds that any slave brought to a free state by his or her owner was thereby set free.
1838	Hinds v. Brazealle	Supreme Court of Mississippi	Denied a deed of manumission in Ohio for a citizen of Mississippi's mixed-race son and his slave mother, because it was against Mississippi statutes (which required an act by the state legislature), and was considered fraud
1838	North Carolina v. Manuel	Supreme Court of North Carolina	Judge William Gaston held that free blacks, including former slaves, were citizens of North Carolina and could not be denied any rights guaranteed under the state constitution, including that of declaring insolvency to avoid imprisonment or forced labor for debt. (The decision was cited in Justice Benjamin Curtis's dissent in Dred Scott, below.)
1841	United States v. Libellants and Claimants of the Schooner Amistad	Supreme Court of the United States	As the Africans in question were never legal property, they were not criminals and had rightfully defended themselves in mutiny. They were unlawfully kidnapped, and the Court directed the President to transport them in return to Africa.
1842	Prigg v. Pennsylvania	Supreme Court of the United States	Overturned the conviction of slavecatcher Edward Prigg in Pennsylvania based on the ruling that Federal law (which provides for recovery of fugitive slaves) supersedes State law.
1851	Strader v. Graham	Supreme Court of the United States	The status of three slaves who traveled from Kentucky to the free states of Indiana and Ohio depended on Kentucky slave law rather than Ohio law, which had abolished slavery.
1852	Lemmon v. New York	Superior Court of the City of New York	Granted freedom to slaves who were brought into New York by their Virginia slave owners, while in transit to Texas.
1853	Northup v. Epps	–	Recognized that Solomon Northup, who had been abducted from New York and sold as a slave in Louisiana, was free.
1853	Holmes v. Ford	Oregon Territorial Supreme Court	Granted freedom to a family of slaves who had been brought to Oregon with their master from Missouri, as this action violated the Organic Laws of Oregon, which did not allow slavery.
1857	Dred Scott v. Sandford	Supreme Court of the United States	People of African descent imported into the United States and held as slaves, or their descendants – whether or not they were slaves – were not citizens of the United States under the Constitution and therefore could not sue in federal court and had "no rights which the white man was bound to respect".
1859	Ableman v. Booth	Supreme Court of the United States	Held that state courts cannot issue rulings that contradict the decisions of federal courts, overturning the decision of the Wisconsin Supreme Court that the Fugitive Slave Law of 1850 was unconstitutional.
1985	United States v. Sante Kimes	U.S. District Court	Charged with "conspiracy to violate slavery laws" after offering to employ illegal immigrants and then keeping them as prisoners after Kimes was unwilling or unable to pay them. Kimes was sentenced to five years in prison for violating federal anti-slavery laws
2021	Nestlé USA, Inc. v. Doe	Supreme Court of the United States	Held that respondents improperly sought extraterritorial application of the Alien Tort Statute, as the petitioner's domestic conduct – investing in and doing business with plantations that use child slave labor – constituted general corporate activity and conduct that directly caused injury outside the United States.

== See also ==
- Freedom suit
- Slavery in the colonial United States
- Slavery in the United States
- Slave trade acts
- The Abolition Riot of 1836 took place in a courtroom
