= William L. Sharkey =

American judge (1798–1873)

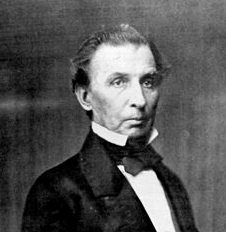

25th Governor of Mississippi
- In office June 13, 1865 – October 16, 1865
- Preceded by: Charles Clark
- Succeeded by: Benjamin G. Humphreys

9th Speaker of the Mississippi House of Representatives
- In office January 5, 1829 – February 6, 1829
- Preceded by: Charles B. Green
- Succeeded by: Joseph Dunbar

Member of the Mississippi House of Representatives from the Warren County district
- In office January 7, 1828 – February 6, 1829

Personal details
- Born: July 12, 1798 Sumner County, Tennessee, U.S.
- Died: March 30, 1873 (aged 74) Washington, D.C., U.S.
- Party: Whig

William Lewis Sharkey (July 12, 1798 – March 30, 1873) was an American judge and politician from Mississippi. A staunch Unionist during the American Civil War, he opposed the 1861 declared secession of Mississippi from the United States. After the end of the war, President Andrew Johnson appointed Sharkey as provisional governor of Mississippi in 1865.

== Biography ==
=== Early life ===
William Lewis Sharkey was born on July 12, 1798, near Mussel Shoals in Sumner County, Tennessee. He was the son of Patrick Sharkey, an Irish immigrant, and his wife, "the daughter of a German pioneer". He had two younger brothers, Jacob Rhodes Sharkey and James Elliott Sharkey. When William was six, he moved with his family in 1804 to Warren County, Mississippi. His parents died when he was young and he had to take care of his younger brothers. At age 17, he enlisted in the War of 1812 where he fought in the Battle of New Orleans. He was educated at a college in Greenville, Tennessee, and read the law as an apprentice with Edward Turner. In 1822, he was admitted to the bar in Natchez, Mississippi.

=== Career ===
In 1825, Sharkey moved to Vicksburg, where he formed a law partnership with John I. Guion. He was later elected for two terms in the Mississippi House of Representatives, where he served from 1828 to 1829. He served as the Speaker of the House in 1829.

He served briefly in 1832 as a circuit court judge before being elected to the High Court of Errors and Appeals of Mississippi (today the Supreme Court of Mississippi), where he sat as a justice for 18 years until his resignation on October 1, 1850. In his role as Chief Justice, he ruled in 1838 in the case Hinds v. Brazealle, a freedom suit, that a manumission granted by a Mississippi man during a stay in the free state of Ohio to his enslaved common law wife and their child was null and void under Mississippi state law as he had not obtained permission from the Mississippi state legislature for said manumission. Consequently, Brazealle's testament was also rendered unenforceable as he had left his entire estate to his son, John Munroe Brazealle, and according to Sharkey's ruling John Munroe Brazealle was still a slave and thus ineligible to hold property under Mississippi law.

Sharkey was appointed Secretary of War by then-President Millard Fillmore; however, he declined the position. He did accept a diplomatic appointment, and from 1851 to 1854, he served as US Consul in Havana, Cuba. While he was serving as Consul, he swore in William R. King as Vice President of the United States on March 24, 1853. This, which was permitted by a special Act of Congress passed on March 2, was, to date, the only occasion that an American vice presidential oath of office or presidential oath of office has been administered on foreign soil. King, who was suffering from tuberculosis, would die on April 18 two days after he arrived at his home in Alabama.

A member of the Whig Party, Sharkey was vehemently opposed to the secession of Mississippi in 1861. Throughout the Civil War, he remained a staunch Southern Unionist and, according to one source, was "tolerated by his Confederate neighbors only because of his towering reputation as a jurist."

Governor Charles Clark appointed him in 1865 as a commissioner (along with William Yerger) to confer on behalf of the state with President Andrew Johnson. On June 13, 1865, Johnson appointed Sharkey the state's provisional governor. Sharkey left office with the election of Benjamin G. Humphreys in October.

=== Death ===
Sharkey died in Washington, D.C., in 1873. He is interred in Greenwood Cemetery in Jackson, Mississippi.

== Legacy ==
Sharkey County, Mississippi, located in the Mississippi Delta region, is named in his honor.

== See also ==
- Hinds v. Brazealle
- List of justices of the Supreme Court of Mississippi

Political offices
Preceded by Charles Clark	Governor of Mississippi; 1865	Succeeded by Benjamin G. Humphreys
Preceded by Edward Turner	Justice of the Supreme Court of Mississippi; 1832–1851	Succeeded by Collin S. Tarpley (appointed); William Yerger (elected)
