= Partus =

Partus may refer to:

- childbirth, the culmination of a woman's pregnancy period with delivery of a newborn child
- Partus praematurus, medical term for premature birth of a baby
- partus sequitur ventrum, a legal doctrine relating to the citizenship status of children born to slaves
