= Iola Leroy =

1892 novel by Frances Harper

Iola Leroy, or Shadows Uplifted
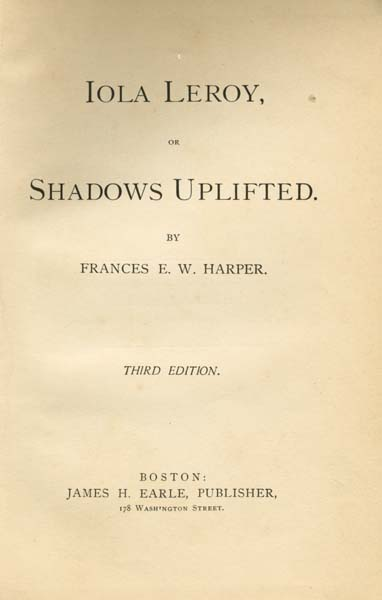
- Title page
- Author: Frances E. W. Harper
- Language: English
- Genre: Social novel
- Set in: USA, about 1840-80
- Publisher: James H. Earle
- Publication date: 1892
- Publication place: USA
- Pages: iv, 282
- Text: Iola Leroy, or Shadows Uplifted at Wikisource

Iola Leroy, or Shadows Uplifted, an 1892 novel by Frances E. W. Harper, is one of the first novels published by an African-American woman. This novel takes place during and after the Civil War during the post-Reconstruction era, and follows the life or Iola Leroy and her family. While following what has been termed the "sentimental" conventions of late nineteenth-century writing about women, it also deals with serious social issues of education for women, passing, miscegenation, abolition, reconstruction, temperance, and social responsibility.

== Characters ==
=== Iola Leroy and Family ===
Iola Leroy, the principal character of the novel. Iola Leroy is a young woman of mixed race who is raised as white but is later sold into slavery after her father’s death. Iola starts the novel as a very sheltered and uneducated woman. Throughout the novel, she learns more about the black community, and she dedicates much of herself and her future to working to improve conditions for African Americans, especially in the South.

Harriet Johnson, Iola Leroy's grandmother. While a slave of Nancy Johnson, she resists a whipping. As a punishment, she is sold.

Robert Johnson. He is still a child when separated from his mother Harriet. His enslaver, Nancy Johnson, sees him as a "pet animal" and teaches him to read. As a young man, he becomes the leader of a group of slaves who decide to seek refuge with the Union army during the Civil War. He enlists in a colored regiment and is promoted to lieutenant. On account of his white skin, his superiors counsel him to change to a white regiment for better chances of promotion, but he refuses. After the war, he successfully runs a hardware store.

Marie Leroy, Iola's mother. A small child when brutally separated from her mother Harriet Johnson, she finally becomes the slave of wealthy Eugene Leroy. When Eugene becomes seriously ill, she nurses him back to health. He sets her free, has her educated and marries her in a secret ceremony. Although she is so white that "no one would suspect that she has one drop of negro blood in her veins", the marriage results in the Leroy family becoming social outcasts.

Harry Leroy, Iola's brother. Like Iola, he is educated in the North. The African ancestry of their mother is concealed from the children, and they are not allowed to pass their vacations at home, spending that time instead together with the parents in a northern holiday resort. When he learns that his father has died and his mother and sister are enslaved, he becomes seriously ill from the shock. When he recovers, the Civil War has begun and he decides to enlist in a colored regiment, making the recruiting officer wonder why a white man should want to do that.

Dr. Frank Latimer, the man who Iola finally marries. He was born into slavery as the son of an enslaved mother of predominantly European ancestry and a white man. After emancipation, his mother invested her hard earnings to pay for his studies. He graduated as a medical doctor and afterwards met his white grandmother, the rich mother of his deceased father, who offered to "adopt him as her heir, if he would ignore his identity with the colored race". Although no trace of his African ancestry was visible in his appearance, he declined the offer.

Lucille Delany, a black woman with apparently no European ancestry, the founder of a school for "future wives and mothers", and the woman who Harry finally marries.

=== Other Black Characters ===
Tom Anderson, friend of Robert Johnson. He seeks refuge with the Union army together with Johnson, causes the commander to set Iola free, joins the army and dies in Iola's care from wounds he received while knowingly sacrificing himself in order to save his comrades.

Aunt Linda, enslaved cook of Nancy Johnson who has a special liking for Robert. She is illiterate and speaks in black dialect, yet she is among the black female characters of the novel who are intelligent, loyal to each other and of central importance to their community.

Uncle Daniel, elder friend of Robert Johnson. When Robert and his group seek refuge with the Union army, he stays behind because he doesn't want to break his promise to his absent master.

=== White characters ===
Dr. Gresham, military physician. He falls in love with Iola while he still thinks that she is white. When informed that she is "colored", his love helps him to overcome his prejudice, and he proposes to Iola at two different points of the story. When rejected for the second time, "sympathy, love, and admiration were blended in the parting look he gave her".

Dr. Latrobe, physician from the South. He is mentioned only in chapters 26, Open Questions, and 28, Dr. Latrobe's Mistake. In a discussion, he voices the view of southern white supremacists.

== Plot Summary ==
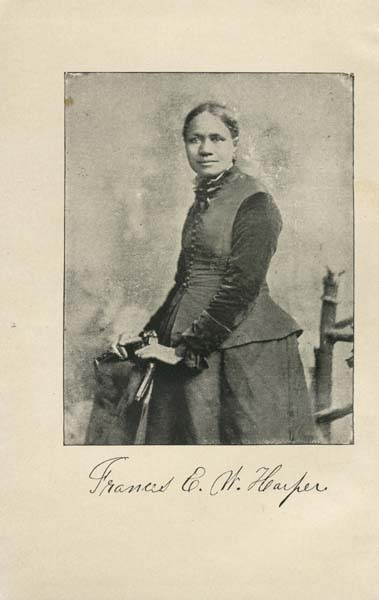
Frances Harper on the book's frontispiece

In a North Carolina town which is only identified as "C—", a group of slaves led by Robert Johnson seek refuge with the Union army that is approaching in the course of the Civil War. Robert's friend Tom Anderson then informs the Union commander of a beautiful young woman held as a slave in the neighborhood, who is subsequently set free by the commander.

In a retrospective, the narrative turns to the story of that woman, Iola Leroy. Her father, Eugene Leroy, was a wealthy slaveholder, who had survived a serious illness through the care of a young slave, Marie. He set Marie free, married her and had three children, whose African ancestry was not visible in their outward appearance. Because of their light skin complexion, their children including Iola and Harry were sent to the North for their education unaware of their African history (also known as "negro blood") because it was hidden from them. When Eugene suddenly died of yellow fever, his cousin, Alfred Lorraine, had a judge declare Marie's manumission void. Hence, Marie and her children were legally considered slaves and the heritage fell to Lorraine and other distant relatives. Lorraine sent his agent to the northern seminary where Iola was preparing for her graduation and defending the institution of slavery in discussions with her fellow students. When Iola returned home from school she learned that her father had died, that her sister Gracie is near death, and her and her mother were being sold into slavery.

The narrative then returns to the events following Iola's rescue by the Union army: Robert Johnson and Tom Anderson join the army "to strike a blow for freedom", while Iola becomes a nurse at a field hospital. When Robert is entrusted to her care after being wounded, they tell each other their stories which suggest that they discovered Robert might be the brother of Iola's mother—her uncle.

After the war, Iola and her uncle go searching for their family. They return to "C—" to search for Robert's mother, whom they recognize when she tells her story during a prayer meeting. They eventually find their family and decide to move back to the North. Iola’s path eventually intersects with Dr. Frank Latimer, a mixed-race physician who shares her commitment to racial uplift and rejects the opportunity to pass as white in order to gain social and economic advantages. Their shared beliefs about education, identity, and community reform lead to a relationship, and they later marry while continuing to work toward the advancement of African Americans in the post-war South. Iola chooses to continue to identify as black, and works to pursue education and social reform.

== Historical Context ==
Iola Leroy was published in 1892, which was during the post-Reconstruction era. This was when African Americans were experiencing tons of restrictions towards their rights even though slavery had "ended." This was especially present in the Southern states, and ended up leading into the Jim Crow era. The post-Reconstruction period was marked by unstable legal and social conditions for freed African Americans, particularly in the South, where new systems of racial control replaced formal slavery. During this time period, a lot of people believed in "racial science" and that Black people were less sensitive or emotional. This novel reflects on concerns at this time like racial inequality, education restriction, and advancements economically and politically during the late 19th century.

Frances E.W. Harper was an abolitionist, teacher, and activist who focused on working on racial injustice, women's rights, and the temperance of society at the time. These things she worked for and experiences she had inspired this novel greatly and she portrays and reflects on a lot of things she experienced through the life of Iola. She uses the narrative to challenge the idea that race determines individuals’ emotions or behavior.

This novel hits on racial identity and the idea that people of mixed race could choose to "pass" as white to avoid discrimination. Harper chooses to overcome this idea by having Iola not choose to "pass as white" and instead embrace her identity. This highlights themes of racial pride and challenges the idea that Black identity was something to be viewed negatively during this time. This reflects a broader push in the late nineteenth century for African Americans to build strong communities through education, leadership, and mutual support.

== Themes ==
Much space is given to discussions in which the characters talk about themes such as temperance, religion, the position of women in society, alleged white superiority, racism and lynchings, and the color line.

Temperance: The damaging effects of alcohol are often discussed in the book. For example, after the war the black characters tell each other of two former masters who took to drink and ended up in the "pore-house" (chapters 18, 19). After Robert Johnson has found his long-lost mother, Aunt Linda pours three glasses of her home-made wine so they can celebrate the event. Robert refuses the wine stating, "I'm a temperance man", causing the conversion of Aunt Linda to the temperance idea.

Religion: Prayer plays an important role in the life of the black characters: Iola and Robert discover the first clue of their kinship when Iola sings a special hymn at the bedside of the wounded Robert, which he has learned from his mother (chapter 16). Both find Harriet, their lost grandmother and mother, during a prayer meeting (chapter 20).

When Iola's brother Harry learns that his mother and sister have been reduced to slavery, he asks how such a thing is possible in a "Christian country". The principal of his school gives the answer: "Christian in name" (chapter 14). After the war and the abolition of slavery, in a discussion with her uncle Robert and Dr. Gresham, Iola states that a "fuller comprehension of the claims of the Gospel of Jesus Christ and their application to our national life" is the only "remedy by which our nation can recover from the evil entailed upon her by slavery", to which both Robert and Gresham agree (chapter 25).

In the course of their discussions, the characters also mention Islam. The black pastor, Rev. Carmicle, speaks of the "imperfect creed" of "Mohammedanism". In another discussion, Prof. Gradnor, a black professor from North Carolina, sees Islamic countries as "civilized" and compares them favorably to the southern United States, referring to lynchings and stating, "I know of no civilized country on the globe, Catholic, Protestant, or Mohammedan, where life is less secure than it is in the South".

Women In Society: The female characters who exert strong influence on the men in their roles as "moral forces owe something to Stowe and the cult of true womanhood", but they are neither "patterned after the white model" nor are they silent or submissive. On the contrary, "Harper shows the necessity for women's voice". In a conversazione among educated blacks, Iola and Lucille, the only female participants "dominate the discussions. ... Their outspoken, sometimes feminist remarks are readily accepted by the men".

After Iola and her uncle Robert have moved to the North, Iola tells her uncle that she wants to apply for a job as saleswoman. Robert earns enough so that she doesn't have "to go out to work", but she tells him,

"I have a theory that every woman ought to know how to earn her own living. I believe that a great amount of sin and misery springs from the weakness and inefficiency of women."

Alleged White Superiority: In chapter 17, Iola is teaching black children, when a "gentleman" asks to address the class. He talks about the "achievements of the white race" and then asks "how they did it."

″They've got the money,″ chorused the children.

″But how did they get it ?″

″They took it from us,″ chimed the youngsters.

Positive View of Black History: In chapter 30, Lucille Delany says, "Instead of forgetting the past, I would have [our people] hold in everlasting remembrance our great deliverance." Historian David W. Blight quotes this as an example for Harper's work "to forge a positive view of black history", an aim she shared with fellow black writer Pauline Hopkins.

=== Racial Identity and Passing ===
A theme that appears in the novel is racial identity and passing. There are several characters in this novel, including Iola, her brother, and Dr. Latimer, that are mixed and could pass as white, yet they choose to identify as Black. This choice shows that Harper is pushing back against the idea that race defines who someone is, including their character, intelligence, or morals. When this novel was written, ideas about race were widely used to justify inequality, often portraying Black people as less sensitive or capable. Harper challenges these assumptions by presenting these characters in the story as intelligent, compassionate, and morally strong, regardless of what race they are. By giving these qualities to a character who could be either white or Black, it separates these qualities from only white people. Iola choosing not to pass as white matters a lot because it’s not just a personal choice. It’s about doing what she believes is right and standing with her community. By embracing her identity, she aligns herself with the Black community and commits to working toward its advancement through education and reform. This really enforces the novels idea of racial pride and that your morality is not based on your race, but who you choose to be as a person.

== Publication History ==
According to Jennifer Harris in the African American Review, Iola Leroy was simultaneously first published in 1892 in Philadelphia by the Garrigues Brothers and in Boston by James Harvey Earle, whose father was the pastor A. B. Earle. In 2010, Penguin Classics published a version edited by Henry Louis Gates Jr. with an introduction by Hollis Robbins.

== Literary Significance and Criticism ==
Iola Leroy "may well have [been] influenced" by Harriet Jacobs's 1861 autobiography Incidents in the Life of a Slave Girl.

The novel was "awarded more blame than praise" by literary critics, but "initial readers responded positively", causing the novel to be reprinted until 1895. From then on, however, it was not re-published until 1971.

Iola Leroy was for some time cited as the first novel written by an African-American woman. Professor Henry Louis Gates Jr.'s 1982 discovery of Harriet Wilson's Our Nig (1859) displaced it from that spot. Still, it remains important as "the first black vision of black women's roles in reshaping post-Civil War America" and as a fictional work dealing with complex issues of race, class, and politics in the United States. Recent scholarship suggests that Harper's novel provides a sophisticated understanding of citizenship, gender, and community, particularly the way that African Americans developed hybrid forms of gemeinschaft and gesellschaft before, during, and after slavery.

The African-American journalist Ida B. Wells took up the pen name "Iola" when she first started writing articles about racism in the South.

According to J. F. Yellin, Iola Leroy "helped shape the writings of Zora Neale Hurston and other foremothers of black women writing today."

== See also ==
- Hinds v. Brazealle, a Mississippi court case that may have inspired the novel
