= Rachel v. Walker =

Freedom suit in Missouri Supreme Court (1836)

Rachel v. Walker (1834) was a "freedom suit" filed in the St. Louis Circuit Court by an African woman named Rachel who had been enslaved. She petitioned for her freedom and that of her son James (John) Henry from William Walker (a slave trader), based on having been held illegally as a slave in the free territory of Michigan by a previous master, an Army officer. Her case was appealed to the Supreme Court of Missouri, where she won in 1836. The court ruled that an Army officer forfeited his slave if he took the person to territory where slavery is prohibited. This ruling was cited as precedent in 1856 in the famous Dred Scott v. Sandford case before the Supreme Court of the United States.

Rachel's was one of 301 19th-century freedom suits found among St. Louis Circuit Court records in the 1990s; it is the largest group of case files in the country available to researchers. The Missouri History Museum's research center maintains a searchable database online of the freedom suits.

== History ==
While slaves had no legal standing as citizens, under an 1824 Missouri state law, they were entitled to file as "poor people" to sue for freedom. If the court believed that the case had substantive grounds, it would assign counsel to represent the slave. The law further provided that the slaveholder must allow the slave time to consult with counsel and prohibited taking the slave from the jurisdiction of the court until the case was heard.

In the case, the court assigned Josiah Spalding as counsel to represent Rachel in her case. She had been held by the army lieutenant Thomas Stockton at Fort Snelling (present-day Minnesota), and her son had been born in 1834 at Fort Crawford, (present-day Wisconsin), both in the Michigan Territory (a free territory) at that time. Stockton had returned with Rachel and James Henry to St. Louis, where he sold them. The second owner resold them to the slave trader William Walker, who planned to take them "downriver" (down the Mississippi) for likely sale in New Orleans. Rachel sued for freedom based on having been illegally held as a slave during lengthy residence in free territories. Although the lower court ruled against Rachel, Spalding appealed the case to the Missouri Supreme Court. In 1836, it ruled in favor of Rachel in one of the decisions that established "its tendency to enforce the laws of the neighboring free states" that a slaveholder forfeited rights to a slave by taking the person into free territory.

By the time the case reached the State Supreme Court, it involved only Rachel. After her victory, she had to file a separate suit to free her son James Henry but was successful. The court continued with the precedent of Winny v. Whitesides (1824) in which the state supreme court held that a slave was free after having been held illegally in a free state and "once free always free." Specifically, the it held that "if an officer of the United States Army takes a slave to a territory where slavery is prohibited, he forfeits his property." The case was based on a woman, "Winny," who petitioned the Missouri Supreme Court, and her case established the Missouri precedent for freeing slaves who had lived in free territory. She claimed that her owner Phoebe Whitesides had imprisoned her without cause. Whitesides had moved from North Carolina to St. Louis, Missouri. If she were declared free, her nine children and grandchildren would also be declared free. This case went to trial and the St. Louis circuit court on 13 February 1822. The jury's decision freed Winny and her descendants. Whitesides appealed the case and it came before the Missouri Supreme Court in 1824. Again, the court decision favored Winny and her descendants. The court ruled, "We are clearly of opinion that if, by a residence in Illinois (Whitesides) lost her right to the property in the defendant, that right was not revived by a removal, of the parties to Missouri."

Following is a transcript of Rachel's petition for freedom:

To the Judge of the St. Louis Circuit Court

The petition of Rachel, a mulatto woman aged about twenty years of age represents that about five years ago she was claimed and possessed as a slave by one Stockton, who then took your petitioner to the territory of Michigan, where he resided at Prairie du Chien, on the east side of the Mississippi River for about two years, holding your petitioner a slave during that time at that place arranging her to work for & serve himself & family at that place. At which place her child James Henry was born he being held by this Stockton during that time as a slave. That afterwards he brought your petitioner to St. Louis where he sold her and the child to one Joseph Klunk who has recently sold her and said child to one William Walker, who is a dealer in slaves & is about to take your petitioner and the child down the Mississippi River, probably to New Orleans for sale. That said Walker now holds your petitioner and child in slavery, claiming her as his slave, and your petitioner prays that your petitioner and said child may be allowed to sue as a poor person in the St. Louis Circuit Court for freedom & that the said Walker may be restrained from carrying her & said child out of the jurisdiction of the St. Louis Circuit Court till the termination of said suit. November 4th, 1834

Rachel (her mark) for her self and child James Henry (p. 1 of 24)

== Decision ==
Justice Mathias McGirk of the Missouri Supreme Court said that Stockton had "willfully procured a slave and held her, unlawfully, in free territories, an act punishable by forfeiture of the slave, as decreed by territorial law." With this ruling, he was supporting the laws of the neighboring free territories and states and closing a loophole by which Army officers had tried to argue they could keep slaves. Stockton had argued that he had no choice in his assignments with the Army, so should not have to lose his slave property as a result.

Rachel's success in this case gave her the basis to successfully sue for freedom for her son James Henry; as he was born to a woman held illegally as a slave in a free state (and freed on those grounds), he was also free, according to the principle of partus sequitur ventrem, in which the child gained his social status from his mother.

== See also ==
- American slave court cases
