= William Yerger =

American judge

William Yerger

William Yerger (November 22, 1816 – June 7, 1872) was a justice of the Supreme Court of Mississippi from 1851 to 1853.

Born in Lebanon, Tennessee, Yerger graduated from Cumberland College before he attained his majority, and was immediately admitted to the bar. In 1837, he moved to Mississippi and began to practice law in Jackson. He was described as "a profound lawyer and an eloquent advocate".

In 1850, though a member of the Whig Party then in the minority and opposed to most of the popular measures of the day, he was elected to a seat on the state supreme court which had been vacated by the resignation of William L. Sharkey, and subsequently filled by the appointment of Collin S. Tarpley. Among his opinions is a noted concurrence with Justice Cotesworth P. Smith, in the case of State of Mississippi v. Johnson, 25th Miss., 625. Judge Wiley P. Harris, in presenting to the supreme court the memorial resolutions of the bar touching Judge Yerger's death, said: "It is not for me to attempt to measure the intellectual stature of William Yerger, nor to point out and define those traits of mind by which he built up a splendid and lasting reputation. I may refer, however, to the manifestations of his great powers which were obvious to us all."

Political offices
Preceded by William L. Sharkey (elected); Collin S. Tarpley (appointed)	Justice of the Supreme Court of Mississippi; 1851–1853	Succeeded by Alexander Hamilton Handy
