= Elizabeth Key Grinstead =

Enslaved woman in colonial America (1630–1665)

- Born: c. 1630 or 1632; Warwick County, Colony of Virginia
- Died: 1665 (aged 34–35)

Elizabeth Key Grinstead (also Greenstead; c. 1630 or 1632 – 1665) was one of the first mixed race people in the Thirteen Colonies to sue for freedom from slavery and win. Key won her freedom and that of her infant son, John Grinstead, on July 21, 1656, in the Colony of Virginia.

Key based her suit on two connected arguments: her father's status as a free English man and her status as an indentured servant. Key's father was an Englishman who had acknowledged her and baptized her as a Christian in the American branch of the Church of England. He was a wealthy planter who had tried to protect her by establishing a guardianship for her when she was young, before his death. This guardianship outlined that her father gave Key away on an indenture which was supposed to end when she turned 15, but this agreement had expired well before the time of the suit. Based on these factors, her attorney and common-law husband, William Grinstead, argued successfully that she should be freed. The lawsuit was one of the earliest "freedom suits" by an African-descended person in the English colonies.

In response to Key's suit and other challenges, the Virginia House of Burgesses passed a law in 1662 establishing that the social status of children born in the colony ("bond" or "free") would follow the social status of their respective mothers. This law differed from English common law, in which children's social status was determined by their fathers, who had an obligation to support both legitimate and illegitimate children. Virginia and other colonies incorporated a principle known as partus sequitur ventrem or partus, relating to chattel property. The legislation hardened the boundaries of slavery by ensuring that all children born to enslaved women, regardless of paternity or proportion of European ancestry, would be born into slavery unless explicitly freed.

== Early life and education ==
Key, sometimes spelled Kaye, was born in 1630 or 1632 in Warwick County, Virginia. Her mother was an indentured African woman, and her father was Thomas Key, an English planter and a member of the Virginia House of Burgesses, representing Denby, which was later part of Warwick County, but is today's Newport News. Thomas Key's legal white wife lived across the James River in Isle of Wight County, Virginia, where she owned considerable property. Born in England, the Keys were considered pioneer planters as they had come to Virginia before 1616, remained for more than three years, paid their passage, and survived the Indian massacre of 1622.

Around 1636, in a civic case at Blunt Poynt court, Thomas Key was charged with fathering the mixed-race Elizabeth Key. Initially, he denied the charge. Complaints about illegitimate children were brought to court so that fathers would be required to provide support for those children, under English common law, including arranging for apprenticeships so that they could learn skills necessary for their livelihood.

Thomas Key first said an unidentified "Turk" (Note: Turk was a colloquial catch-all for Muslims during the Middle Ages and Early modern period) was Elizabeth's father, but the Court relied on witnesses who testified to his paternity. Thomas Key took responsibility for Elizabeth, arranging for her baptism in the established Church of England and supporting her financially. Sometime before his death that same year (1636), Thomas placed Elizabeth (then aged six) in the custody of Humphrey Higginson for a nine-year indenture.

Higginson, a wealthy planter who owned several plantations, was expected to act as her guardian until Key reached the age of 15 (considered the "coming of age" for girls; during this period, girls frequently married or began working for wages at age 15). Upon reaching age 15, Elizabeth Key would be free.

During this period in early Virginia, African and European servants were likely to be indentured for a period of years, usually to pay off passage to the Americas. The colony required illegitimate children to be indentured for a period of apprenticeship until they "came of age" and could be expected to support themselves. While mortality was high, it was common for indentured servants to earn their freedom. Working class people of different ethnicities lived, worked, ate, and played together as equals, and many married or formed unions during the colonial period.

Thomas Key intended Higginson to act as Elizabeth Key's guardian, but the latter did not keep his commitment to take the girl with him if he returned to England. Instead, he transferred (or sold) her indenture to Col. John Mottram, the first Anglo-European settler in Northumberland County. In about 1640, Mottram moved to the undeveloped county, taking Elizabeth at age 10 with him as a servant. There is little record of Key's next 15 years.

== William Grinstead and Key's freedom suit ==
=== William Grinstead ===
In about 1650, Mottram paid for passage for a group of 20 young white English indentured servants to Coan Hall, his plantation in Northumberland County. To encourage development, the Crown had awarded Virginia colonists headrights of 50 acres (200,000 m^{2}) of land for each person they transported to the colony; generally, these persons were indentured servants. Each indentured person would serve for six years to pay for the passage from England.

One of these servants was 16-year-old William Grinstead (also spelled Greenstead), a young lawyer. (He is considered the immigrant English ancestor of numerous descendants of Grinstead and spelling variations.) Although Grinstead's parents are not known, he may have learned law as the younger son of an attorney. Under the English common law of primogeniture, only the eldest son could inherit the father's real property, so many younger sons crossed the Atlantic to seek their lives and fortunes in the American colonies.

Recognizing Grinstead's value, Mottram used the young man for representation in legal matters for Coan Hall. During this period, Grinstead and Elizabeth Key began a relationship and had a son together, whom they named John Grinstead. They were prohibited from marrying while Grinstead was serving his indenture. Elizabeth Key's future was uncertain.

=== Key's 1655 freedom suit ===
After Mottram died in 1655, the overseers of his estate had to sort Mottram's 11 unfree persons into categories of "servants" (meaning they were born free and signed a contract to make them indentured servants) and "negroes" (meaning they were born unfree and are enslaved property of that estate). Due to Key's African heritage, the overseers classified Key and her infant son, John, as Negroes. With William Grinstead acting as her attorney, Key sued the estate over her status, saying she was an indentured servant who had served past her term and that her son was thus freeborn. At 25, Elizabeth had been a servant for a total of 19 years, having served 15 years with Mottram. According to Taunya Lovell Banks in the Akron Law Review, "subjecthood" rather than "citizenship" was more important for determining a person's social status in the young colony.

In the early 17th century,

children born to English parents outside the country became English subjects at birth, others could become "naturalized subjects" (although there was no process at the time in the colonies). What was unsettled was the status of children if only one of the parents was an English subject, as foreigners (including Africans) were not considered subjects. Because non-whites came to be denied civil rights as foreigners, mixed-race people seeking freedom often had to stress their English ancestry (and later, European).

Elizabeth had served as a servant for ten years beyond the terms of her indenture. In trying to establish whether Key's father was a free Englishman, the Court relied on the testimony of witnesses who knew the people in the case.

Nicholas Jurnew, 53, testified in 1655 that he had

heard a flying report [rumor] at Yorke that Elizabeth a Negro Servant to the Estate of Col. John Mottrom (deceased) was the Childe of Mr. Kaye but... Mr. Kaye said that a Turke of Capt. Mathewes was Father to the Girle.

Banks said Jurnew's testimony had the most significant effect on the court's decision. The colonists would not have granted Turks the same rights as themselves, as they were not Christian.

"The most persuasive evidence" about Elizabeth's paternity came from Elizabeth Newman, 80 years old and a former servant of Mottram, who testified that

it was a common Fame in Virginia that Elizabeth a Molletto (sic mulatto), now (e) servant to the Estate of Col. John Mottrom, deceased, was the Daughter of Mr. Kaye; and the said Kaye was brought to Blunt Poynt Court and there fined for getting his Negro woman with Childe, which said Negroe was the Mother of the said Molletto, and the said fine was for getting the Negro with Childe which Childe was the said Elizabeth.

Other witnesses asserted similar testimony.

Believing Thomas Key's paternity was proved by common law, the Court granted Elizabeth Key her freedom. Mottram's estate appealed the decision to the General Court, which overturned it and ruled that Elizabeth was a slave because of her mother's status as Negro.

Through Grinstead, Elizabeth Key took the case to the Virginia General Assembly, which appointed a committee to investigate. They sent the case back to the courts for retrial. Elizabeth Key finally won her freedom on three counts: the most important was that by English common law, the father's status determined the child's status. Her father was a free Englishman, and she was a practicing Christian. In other cases, the courts had ruled that (black) Negro or Indian Christians could not be held in servitude for life. The Assembly may also have been influenced by the reputation of Elizabeth's planter father, Thomas Key, who wanted to carry out his wishes after he had acknowledged his daughter. In addition, the father of her mixed-race child (who was three-quarters white) was himself an English subject. The court ordered Mottram's estate to compensate Key with corn and clothes for her lost years.

Although Elizabeth Key won her court battle for freedom for her and her son John, she and Grinstead could not marry until he completed his indenture in 1656. Theirs was one of the few recorded marriages between an Englishman and a free woman of African descent in the seventeenth century. They had another son together before William Grinstead died early in 1661.

The widow, Elizabeth Grinstead, remarried to the widower John Parse (Pearce). Upon his death, she and her sons John and William Grinstead II inherited 500 acres (2.0 km^{2}), helping to secure their future. This property enabled Elizabeth Grinstead and her sons to get on.

Among the many descendants of Elizabeth (Key) and William Grinstead in the South are believed to be those named Grinstead and people with variations of the surname, such as Greenstead, Grinsted and Grimsted.

== Aftermath ==
As a result of the Elizabeth Key freedom suit (and similar challenges), in December 1662, the Virginia House of Burgesses passed a colonial law to clarify the status of children of women of Negro descent around "doubts [that] have arisen whether children got by an Englishmen upon a negro woman should be slave or free." It required the children born in the colony to take the status of the mother, whether bond or free, using the principle of partus sequitur ventrum. The statute was a departure from the English common law tradition in which a child of English subjects received their social status and an obligation of support from his father.

Some historians believe the law was primarily based on the economic demands of a colony that was short on labor; the law enabled slaveholders to control the children of enslaved women as laborers. But it also freed the white fathers from acknowledging the children as theirs, providing financial support, or arranging for apprenticeships, as they were required to do in England, or emancipating them. Some white fathers did take an interest in their mixed-race children and passed on social capital, such as education or land; many others abandoned them.

Other European colonies (and later American states) passed similar laws, which enslaved all children born to enslaved mothers. If they had free white fathers, as many did under the power conditions of the time, the fathers had to take separate legal action to free their children. In the early 19th century, following slave rebellions in which free blacks played a part, the legislatures of the South made such manumissions more difficult, requiring an act of legislature for each manumission. They also imposed legal restrictions on the rights of free people of color.

After the American Revolutionary War, the new constitution counted enslaved people as only 3/5 persons in figuring apportionment for Congressional seats as a compromise between the slave states that wanted to obtain greater representation by counting enslaved people as whole persons and free states that feared being dominated by the South. Northern states generally abolished slavery in the early 19th century, sometimes gradually. Northern territories (such as the Northwest Territory) and new states admitted to the United States in the northern latitudes prohibited slavery. States settled by Southerners, such as Kentucky, Tennessee, Arkansas, and Missouri, and those of the Deep South, authorized slavery. Only in 1865 did the Thirteenth Amendment to the United States Constitution end slavery in the South and across the United States, except for people enslaved by Native Americans who were not freed by American Indian law until one year later in 1866.

Her descendants include actor Johnny Depp, her eighth great-grandson, and Depp's daughter, actress Lily-Rose Depp.

== See also ==
- American slave court cases
- Charlotte Dupuy
- Polly Berry
- Lucy Delaney
- List of slaves

== Bibliography ==
- The Case of Elizabeth Key, 1655/56 Northumberland County Record Books, 1652–1658, fols. 66–67, 85; 1658–1660, fol. 28; Northumberland County Order Book, 1652–1665, fols. 40, 46, 49, University of Chicago.
- Kathleen Brown (1996). Good Wives, Nasty Wenches, and Anxious Patriarchs: Gender, Race, and Power in Colonial Virginia. University of North Carolina Press. pp. 129–132.
