= The Guardian of Sally (a negro) v. Beatty =

1792 freedom suit in South Carolina

The Guardian of Sally (a negro) v. Beatty was a 1792 court case decided in the Supreme Court of South Carolina. A jury charged by Chief Justice John Rutledge held that a slave who had been bought and manumitted by another slave was free, not the other slave's owner's property.

== Background ==
A slave owned by defendant Beatty, referred to in contemporary reports as "a negro wench slave", had hired herself out for work while paying her owner an agreed-upon monthly sum as a wage. She earned more than the wage she paid to her owner and used the surplus to buy another slave girl, Sally, whom she manumitted. Following purchase and manumission, Beatty did not claim Sally as his property and did not pay taxes for her. However, when Beatty was called on after some time to produce Sally as a free person, Beatty refused; the freedom suit was then brought to the courts.

== Court case ==
The case was decided in the Supreme Court of South Carolina in May 1792. Both sides agreed that common law did not cover slavery and could not be directly applied to the case. The defense argued that slaves could not own property and that any possessions held by a slave were legally the slave's owner's property, citing Roman law as precedent; thus, he argued, Sally was legally his property and could not be manumitted by his slave without his consent. The plaintiff argued that Roman law or the law of the Barbary Coast could not serve as a precedent since the influence of Christianity had made slavery in the United States different, that by agreeing with his slave on fixed wages, Beatty had given his implicit consent to do with any surplus she earned as she willed, and that using her earnings to buy another slave's freedom was such a generous act that it should not be overturned. Chief Justice John Rutledge charged the jury in favor of the plaintiff, concluding that Beatty could not have suffered since he received the agreed-upon wages as equivalent of his slave's work, and if "the wench" chose to appropriate the savings of her extra labor to the purchase of Sally, he hoped no jury would negate such an act of benevolence. The jury, without retiring from the box, returned a verdict in the plaintiff's favor.

== Impact ==
The Guardian of Sally v. Beatty rested on a slave's right to own property of her own. The circumstances were highly unusual, and the decision was contrary to the spirit of the law and was contradicted by subsequent court cases.
