= Decatur House =

Historic house in Washington, D.C., United States

- U.S. National Register of Historic Places
- U.S. National Historic Landmark
- U.S. National Historic Landmark District – Contributing property
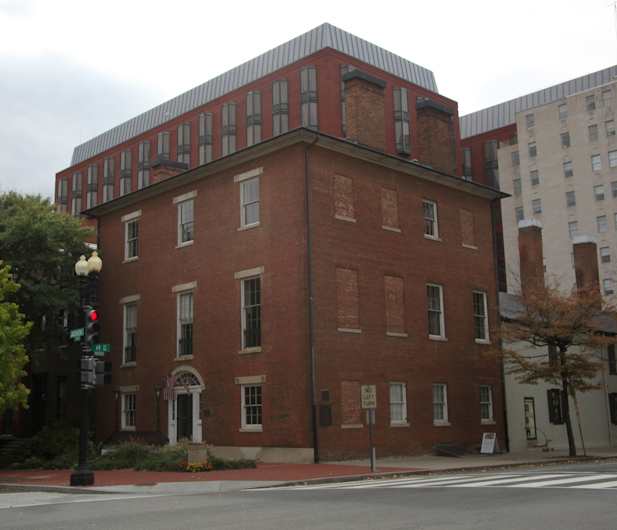
- North side of Decatur House as restored 2006–2008.

- Location within Central Washington, D.C. Location within the District of Columbia Location within the United States
- Location: 748 Jackson Pl., NW. Washington, D.C.
- Coordinates: 38°54′0.2″N 77°2′17.4″W
- Area: < 1-acre (0.40 ha)
- Built: 1818
- Architect: Benjamin Henry Latrobe
- Architectural style: Federal
- Part of: Lafayette Square Historic District (ID70000833)
- NRHP reference No.: 66000858

Significant dates
- Added to NRHP: October 15, 1966
- Designated NHL: December 19, 1960
- Designated NHLDCP: August 29, 1970

Decatur House is a historic house museum at 748 Jackson Place in Washington, D.C., the capital of the United States. It is named after its first owner and occupant, the naval officer Stephen Decatur Jr. Built in 1818, the house is located at the northwest corner of Lafayette Square, about a block from the White House.

In the winter of 1820-21, new owners built an outbuilding on the property at the back which was in part used for slave quarters. Until the Emancipation Proclamation went into effect on January 1, 1863, weekly auctions of enslaved black persons were held in the house's backyard, now a wedding venue. The building currently houses a museum, as well as the National Center for White House History, operated by the White House Historical Association.

== History ==
Decatur House is one of the oldest surviving homes in Washington, D.C., and one of only three remaining houses in the country designed by neoclassical architect Benjamin Henry Latrobe. Completed in 1818 for naval hero Stephen Decatur and his wife, Susan, the Federal Style house is prominently located across Lafayette Square from the White House. It was successively home to Henry Clay, Martin Van Buren and Edward Livingston, who collectively made Decatur House the unofficial residence of the Secretary of State from 1827 to 1833, each renting the house while they served in that post.

The foyer of the Decatur House, designed by Benjamin Henry Latrobe, shown in its restored state.

In 1836 the wealthiest man in Washington D.C., John Gadsby and his wife Providence moved into the house and brought their house slaves. They built a two-story structure at the back to house the home's kitchen and serve as quarters for those Gadsby had enslaved, who previously lived in the main house. This structure is one of the few surviving examples of urban slave quarters in D.C. It is also one of the only surviving pieces of physical evidence that African Americans were once held "in bondage [within] sight of the White House."

Following John Gadsby's death, the home was again rented to a series of prominent tenants. In order, these were Vice President George M. Dallas, publisher and former Mayor of Washington Joseph Gales, Congressmen and brothers John A. King and James G. King, Rep. William Appleton, Speaker of the House James Lawrence Orr and Sen. Judah Benjamin. During the Civil War it was used as Army offices and then sat empty for six years.

Decatur House was purchased in 1872 by Edward Fitzgerald Beale, a frontiersman and explorer who later became a rancher and diplomat. Beale's daughter-in-law, Marie, bequeathed Decatur House to the National Trust for Historic Preservation in 1956. The house was designated a U.S. National Historic Landmark in 1976. In May 2013, American Express granted the Decatur House $1 million. This event was attended by then First Lady Michelle Obama and a host of 6th grade students. The grant was said to "allow the White House Historical Association to conduct further research to understand and promote Decatur House's historical significance as well as support children's educational programs" .

Decatur House, now a museum, is located at 748 Jackson Place, N.W., on President's Park (Lafayette Park). The lower floor is kept in the style of the early 19th century while the upper floor was renovated in the early 20th century.

Because of the centrality of its location, the status of its residents, and the fact that urban slaves worked there across from the White House, the house now contains much material interpreting African American history. Among the stories is that of Charlotte Dupuy, who in 1829 sued her master Henry Clay, then Secretary of State, for her freedom and that of her two children. While she lost her court case, Clay finally freed Dupuy and her daughter in 1840, and her son in 1844. A special exhibit on African American history through 1965 has recently been added to the museum and its website.

== See also ==
- List of residences of presidents of the United States
