= Charlotte Dupuy =

African American plaintiff in freedom suit

Charlotte Dupuy, also called Lottie (c. 1787–1790 – c. 1866), (Note: Charlotte Dupuy was still living in 1860. She and her husband Aaron were named free persons in the 1860 Census for Fayette County, Kentucky. They were 70 and 76 years old, respectively. In his obituary of 1866, he was listed as being survived by his wife, likely Charlotte.) was an enslaved African-American woman who filed a freedom suit in 1829 against her enslaver, Henry Clay, who was then Secretary of State. The case went to trial 17 years before Dred Scott filed his more famous legal challenge to slavery. Then, living in Washington, D.C., Dupuy sued for her freedom and that of her two children based on a promise by her previous enslaver. The case was one of the many freedom suits filed by enslaved people in the decades before the American Civil War.

Although the Circuit Court's ruling in 1830 went against Dupuy, she had worked for wages for 18 months and lived in the household of Martin Van Buren, the succeeding Secretary of State, while it was decided. Clay had returned to his home in Kentucky in 1829. After the ruling, Clay had Dupuy renditioned to the home of his daughter and son-in-law in New Orleans, and she remained enslaved for another decade.

Finally, in 1840, Henry Clay freed Dupuy and her daughter Mary Ann. Four years later, he freed her son Charles Dupuy. By 1860, her husband Aaron Dupuy was listed on the census as a free man living with her at Ashland.

== Early life ==
Charlotte Dupuy was born into slavery in Cambridge, Maryland. She was brought to Kentucky in 1805 by the tailor James Condon, who had purchased her as a child from Daniel Parker in Cambridge. She was said to have been born about 1787. In about 1806, she met and married Aaron Dupuy, a young man held by Henry Clay on his Ashland plantation in Lexington, Kentucky. Condon sold Charlotte to Henry Clay in May 1806, perhaps to allow the young couple to live together. Charlotte and Aaron had two children, Charles and Mary Ann Dupuy.

Clay went to Washington, D.C., for his congressional term beginning in 1810 and took the Dupuys with him. They lived with Clay and served in the house he rented, originally built for Stephen Decatur. Located at Lafayette Square across from the White House, today the Decatur House is a museum and a designated National Historic Landmark.

== Petition for freedom ==
Charlotte Dupuy and her family enjoyed the relative freedom of living in Washington, D.C., where they met other enslaved people and joined some of the city's activities. Clay allowed Charlotte Dupuy to visit her mother and family on the Eastern Shore. Following his Congressional career, Henry Clay served as Secretary of State from 1825 to 1829.

As Clay began making preparations in 1829 to leave the capital when his service ended, Dupuy filed a petition for her freedom and that of her children. She based this on her mother's being free and her previous enslaver Condon's promise to free her and her children. Clay thought his political enemies had persuaded her to do it and decided to fight it, as he was embarrassed by the publicity.

On February 13, 1829, her attorney, Robert Beale, wrote a petition on her behalf to the judges of the District of Columbia. The petition asked the courts to use their power to keep Clay from removing Charlotte Dupuy from the District of Columbia while her lawsuit for freedom was underway. The Court granted this petition.

Beale argued that Dupuy and her children were "entitled to their freedom" based on a promise by her previous enslaver, James Condon, but was "now held in a state of slavery by one Henry Clay (Secty of State) contrary to the law and your petitioners just rights". Clay wanted to remove the Dupuys from their DC residence and return them to Kentucky. There, Beale argued, they would "be held as slaves for life". While the Court allowed Charlotte Dupuy to stay in Washington while the case was heard, it permitted Clay to take her husband Aaron and children Mary Ann and Charles back to Kentucky.

== Case ==
Charlotte Dupuy's petition to stay in the District temporarily was granted, but her writ for freedom was denied. Clay's attorney showed that her mother had been freed after Charlotte was born, which did not affect her status as enslaved. Her case was taken seriously for, according to a letter by Henry Clay, Dupuy stayed in DC "upwards of 18 months" after he left for Kentucky, awaiting the results of the trial. During these 18 months, Clay described her as acting as "her own mistress". Dupuy worked for wages for the succeeding Secretary of State, Martin Van Buren, who also lived at Decatur House. The letter shows that Dupuy never willingly left DC. On the first page, Clay mused, "How shall I now get her ...?" He approved of his agent's having Dupuy arrested when she refused to return to Kentucky.

Although Dupuy was fighting for her freedom, the courts, to hear her case, had to assume her status as a free negro or a free person of color since enslaved people had no legal standing in the courts. Such actions began to create political space for enslaved people's freedom. (Note: For a more in-depth discussion of the liminal space of freedom created by these court cases, see Edlie Wong, Neither Fugitive nor Free: Atlantic Slavery, Freedom Suits, and the Legal Culture of Travel, New York University Press, 2009) The Court determined that the agreement between Dupuy and Condon did not apply to any new enslavement, and rejected her claim against Clay.

== Aftermath ==
Clay's agent arranged for Dupuy to be imprisoned in Alexandria, which was then part of the District of Columbia, while he decided what to do. Clay had Dupuy removed from Washington and transported to New Orleans, to the home of his daughter and son-in-law Martin Duralde Jr. She was enslaved there for another decade.

Finally, on October 12, 1840, Henry Clay freed Charlotte Dupuy and her daughter Mary Ann in New Orleans. He retained her son Charles Dupuy, who traveled with him to speaking engagements. Clay frequently used him as an example of how well he treated enslaved people. He eventually freed Charles in 1844.

Clay, either before he died in 1852 or by his will, or his descendants, freed Charlotte's husband Aaron Dupuy or "gave him his time". The couple reunited to live again in Kentucky, where Aaron worked for John M. Clay at Ashland after his father's death. While no deed of emancipation was found for Aaron Dupuy, according to the 1860 census, he and Charlotte Dupuy lived together as free persons in Fayette County, Kentucky. An obituary of Aaron Dupuy said he died February 6, 1866, and was survived by his widow, although she was not listed by name.

== Legacy ==
- Dupuy's struggle for freedom has been recognized by new exhibits in the Decatur House, where she lived and worked for nearly two decades. The Decatur House has been designated a National Historic Landmark and operates as a museum.
- The story of Charlotte and Aaron Dupuy is also featured at the Isaac Scott Hathaway Museum of Lexington, Kentucky, and in their online exhibits.
- Her suit has made Decatur Place a site in accounts of the historic civil rights movement and its "trail" in Washington, DC.

== See also ==
- Polly Berry
- Lucy Delaney
- List of slaves
