= Collin S. Tarpley =

American judge (1802–1860)

Collin S. Tarpley (1802 – April 30, 1860) was a justice of the Supreme Court of Mississippi in 1851.

Born in Petersburg, Virginia, Tarpley's family moved to Nashville, Tennessee, when he was ten. His widowed mother managed to secure his education at Cumberland University.

He subsequently taught school and then began the study of law under Governor Aaron V. Brown and James K. Polk, who were then partners. With their support, he gained admission to the bar, and began practice in the town of Pulaski. In 1831, he moved to Florence, Alabama, and became associated with John McKinley, who later became a justice of the United States Supreme Court. In 1838, Tarpley moved to Mississippi, settling in Hinds County, where he formed a partnership with Judge John M. Taylor. His firm enjoyed a large and lucrative practice. On the resignation of Chief Justice William L. Sharkey, Governor James Whitfield appointed Tarpley to the supreme bench. A controversy arose as to the power of the governor to make the appointment, and Tarpley soon resigned and resumed private practice.

Tarpley "was public spirited and took an active interest in agricultural questions". In 1859 he "delivered a polished address" to the Shelby County, Tennessee, Agricultural Association, in which he earnestly advocated the conversion of the Hermitage, then the property of the State of Tennessee, into an agricultural college. He is said to have been the originator of the scheme for the construction of the New Orleans and Jackson Railroad. He drafted its charter, was one of its directors, devoted much time to the enterprise, and lived to see the fruition of the project which was regarded by many "as the dream of a visionary". He was an ardent Democrat, was a member of the Baltimore convention of 1852, and earnestly advocated the election of Jefferson Davis as governor of Mississippi.

Tarpley died in Jackson, Mississippi, at the age of 58.

Political offices
Preceded by William L. Sharkey	Justice of the Supreme Court of Mississippi; 1851–1851	Succeeded by William Yerger
