= Winny v. Whitesides =

Freedom suit in Missouri Supreme Court (1824)

Winny v. Whitesides alias Prewitt (1 Mo. 472, 1824 WL 1839 [1824]) was the first freedom suit heard by the Supreme Court of Missouri. The case established the state's judicial criteria for an enslaved person's right to freedom. The court determined that if a slave owner took a slave into free territory and established residence there, the slave would be free. The slave remained free even if returned to slave territory, engendering the phrase "once free, always free."

For two decades, the "once free, always free" precedent was upheld in a number of freedom suits.

== Territorial law ==
Winny, a slave living with Phebe Whitesides and her husband in Missouri, filed suit in 1818, basing her claim on the laws of two U.S. territories, the Northwest Territory and the Louisiana Territory (renamed the Missouri Territory when the State of Louisiana joined the Union in 1812).

The Northwest Ordinance of 1787 established laws prohibiting slavery in the Northwest Territory, the region north of the Ohio River comprising the present-day states of Ohio, Indiana, Illinois, Michigan, Wisconsin and Minnesota. Article 6 of the ordinance declares, "There shall be neither slavery nor involuntary servitude in the said territory, otherwise than in the punishment of crimes whereof the party shall have been duly convicted: Provided, always, That any person escaping into the same, from whom labor or service is lawfully claimed in any one of the original States, such fugitive may be lawfully reclaimed and conveyed to the person claiming his or her labor or service as aforesaid."

The Laws of the Territory of Louisiana included "an act to enable persons held in slavery, to sue for their freedom" and a process for achieving that end.(Chapter 35, Freedom, June 27, 1807)

"1. It shall be lawful for any person held in slavery to petition the general court or any court of common pleas, praying that such person may be permitted to sue as a poor person, and stating the grounds on which the claim to freedom is founded..."

"2. The court to whom application is thus made, may direct an action of assault and battery, and false imprisonment, to be instituted in the name of the person claiming freedom against the person who claims the petitioner as a slave..."

"3. If the court, or any judge thereof in vacation shall have reason to believe that the above order has been or is about to be violated, in such case the said court, or any judge thereof in vacation, may require that the person of the petitioner be brought before him or them, by writ of habeas corpus, and shall cause the defendant or defendants, his, her, or their agent to enter into recognizance with sufficient security, conditioned as recited in the above order, or in case of refusal to direct the sheriff of the district to take possession of the petitioner, and hire him or her to the best advantage, which hire shall be appropriated either to the petitioner, or to the defendant or defendants, as the event of the suit may justify...

"4. The court before whom such a suit may be tried, may instruct the jury that the weight of proof lies on the petitioner, but to have regard not only to the written evidences to claim of freedom, but to such other proofs either at law or in equity as the very right and justice as the case may require. And the court on a verdict in favor of the petitioner, may pronounce a judgement of liberation from the defendant or defendants, and all persons claiming by, from, or under, him, her, or them."

"5. Suits instituted in any court of common pleas under this law, may be removed into the general court before judgement, or if judgement is given in any such cause in the court of common pleas, appeal, or writ of error shall lie to the general court as in other cases."

== Winny's suit ==
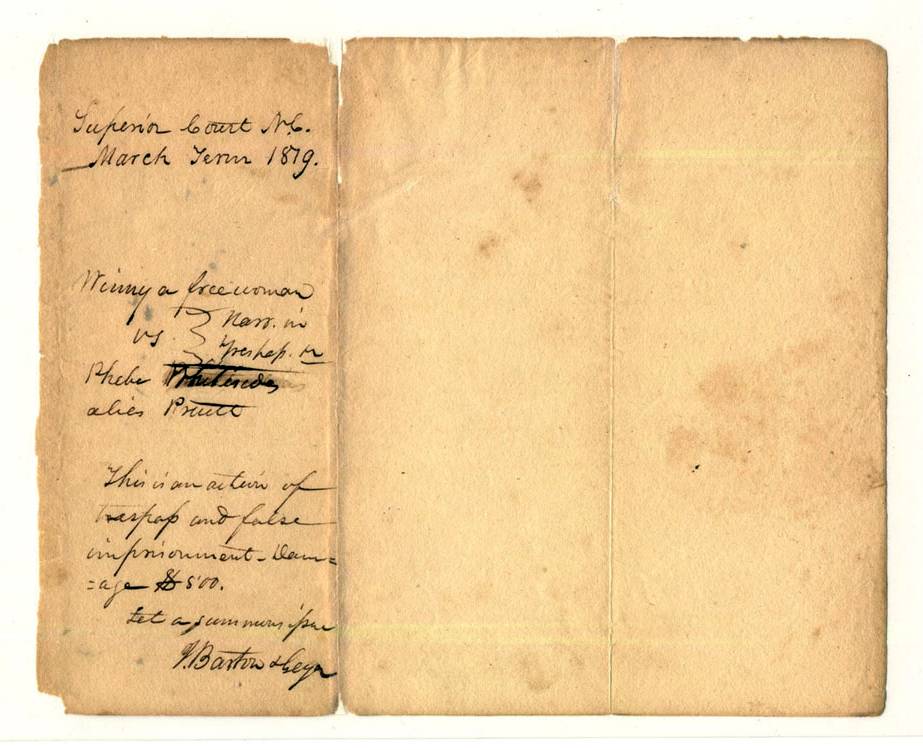
Winny v. Whitesides freedom petition (1819)

In 1794 or 1795, Phebe Whitesides and her husband lived in the Carolinas with a slave about 12 years of age called Winny. When the Whitesides moved to Illinois, then part of the Northwest Territory, they took Winny with them. The couple resided in Illinois for three or four years, retaining the girl in slavery. The Whitesides then moved to St. Louis, Missouri, once more bringing Winny with them and still holding her as a slave.

Winny filed suit to obtain her freedom from Mrs. Whitesides (Mr. Whitesides had died) in the Superior Court of Missouri Territory in 1818. When Missouri entered statehood, the case was transferred to the Circuit Court of St. Louis County. The court assumed the Whitesides had held Winny as a slave in Missouri for about 20 years, at which time she petitioned for her liberty. The records do not explain why she waited to sue or what caused her to sue when she did.

Winny's claim against Phebe Whitesides was "assault and battery." The term did not necessarily connote that Whitesides had been physically abusive, but meant that Whitesides was restraining Winny in an unlawful way, i.e. "unlawful imprisonment."

Whitesides refused liability on the grounds that Winny was her slave. She admitted to "imprisoning" Winny, but claimed the imprisonment was not unlawful, but justified since Winny was not free. Winny challenged this defense.

A jury trial began in February 1822. Winny's case centered on her assertion that residence in the Northwest Territory had conferred her freedom. Whitesides' attorney asked that the jury be instructed Winny's residence in Illinois "did not render the said Winny free, under and by virtue of the ordinance of Congress of 1787." The trial judge refused to give this instruction. Instead, he told the jury that if they believed the Whitesides resided in Illinois, with the intention of making the place their home, they should find for Winny and award damages to her as they would to any plaintiff in an action of false imprisonment.

The jury returned a verdict in Winny's favor and awarded her damages of $167.50.

== Whitesides' appeal ==
Phebe Whitesides appealed the judgment to the Supreme Court of Missouri, which heard the case in late 1824. Her argument consisted of three parts:

First, through the Articles of Confederation, "the [Continental] Congress had no power, either to purchase the said Territory, or to forbid, by law, that slaves should be held in that Territory."

Second, even if Winny had been free in the Northwest Territory, she had not sued for her freedom or been declared free there. For 20 years, Winny had been a resident of Missouri a slave territory and state. According to Whitesides' counsel, her right of ownership "revived so soon as the slave was found in Missouri, unless the slave had, while residing there [in the Northwest Territory], asserted and obtained his freedom by the process of law." Counsel also argued concerning the willingness of the court of one jurisdiction to recognize and apply the law of another. A Missouri court, adjudicating the rights of Missouri residents, need not and should not apply the law of the Northwest Territory or Illinois.

Third, the Northwest Ordinance simply provided that there would not be slavery in the Northwest Territory. It did not state "that the slaves of persons settling in that country . . . thereby become free.

== Court decision ==
The three-member court, Justice Mathias McGirk, Judge George Tompkins and Judge Rufus Pettibone unanimously found in Winny's favor. Tompkins wrote the decision.

As to the first argument, Tompkins conceded the Continental Congress might not have had the power, under the Articles of Confederation, to create the Northwest Territory, but declared that issue moot. As to the laws governing the region, the Constitution of 1789, "expressly placed this power of regulating the Territory where alone it could be exercised, in the Congress." He noted that rules regulating the Territory included laws concerning slavery, "To acquire property is incident to sovereignty; so it is to make rules for the disposition and regulation thereof. To us it appears most manifest that Congress had both power to acquire the Territory, and to forbid the introduction of slaves."

Addressing Whitesides' second point, Tompkins rejected the assumption that the Northwest Territory was akin to a separate nation, asserting it was the property of the states and subject to the laws enacted by those states. Even in situations involving different countries, he opined, "personal rights and disabilities, obtained or communicated by the laws of any particular place, are of a nature which accompany the person wherever he goes." Assuming Winny had gained her freedom in the Northwest Territory, she retained that right, regardless of whether or not she sought or obtained a court decree confirming her status. "If, by a residence in Illinois, [Mrs. Whitesides] lost her right to the property in the defendant, that right was not revived by a removal of the parties to Missouri."

An astonished Tompkins continued, "We did not suppose that any person could mistake the policy of Congress in making this provision. When the States assumed the right of self-government they found their citizens claiming a right of property in a miserable portion of the human race. Sound national policy required that the evil should be restricted as much as possible. What they could, they did. They said, by their representatives, it shall not vest within these limits, and by their acts for nearly half a century they have approved and sanctioned this declaration."

The justice did, however, distinguish between residence and transit. Freedom attached if the master brought the slave into free territory with the intent of residing there, but did not if master and slave simply passed through the territory. "The sovereign power of the United States has declared that 'neither slavery nor involuntary servitude shall exist' there; and this court thinks that the person who takes his slave into said territory, and by the length of his residence there indicates an intention of making that place his residence and that of his slave, and thereby induces a jury to believe that fact, does, by such residence, declare his slave to have become a free man. But it has been urged that by such a construction of the ordinance every person traveling through the territory, and taking along with him his slave, might thereby lose his property in his slave. We do not think the instructions of the Circuit Court can be, by any fair construction, strained so far; nor do we believe that any advocate for this portion of the species ever seriously calculated on the possibility of such a decision."

== Significance ==
At the end of 1824, the Missouri General Assembly passed a law providing a process for enslaved persons to sue for freedom and have some protections in the process. The years between 1824 and 1844 are considered the "golden age" of freedom suits since many slaves won their freedom during these years. Winny v. Whitesides set the standard for determining freedom cases up until the 1850s.

Under its guidance, the courts of Missouri and Kentucky ruled in favor of slaves in most cases. Many of the successful petitions originated in St. Louis County. Between 1806 and 1865, in the City of St. Louis alone, nearly 300 enslaved individuals took legal action against their masters in a fight for freedom.

Notable cases include Merry v. Tiffin & Menard, LaGrange v. Chouteau, Theoteste alias Catiche v. Chouteau, Julia v. McKinney, Wilson v. Melvin and Rachel v. Walker.

The "once free, always free" precedent was overturned by the Missouri Supreme Court in Dred Scott v. Irene Emerson (1852) and the resulting U.S. Supreme Court decision in Dred Scott v. Sanford (1857). Very few slaves pressed successful suits after 1852.
