= Partus sequitur ventrem =

Former legal doctrine of slavery by birth

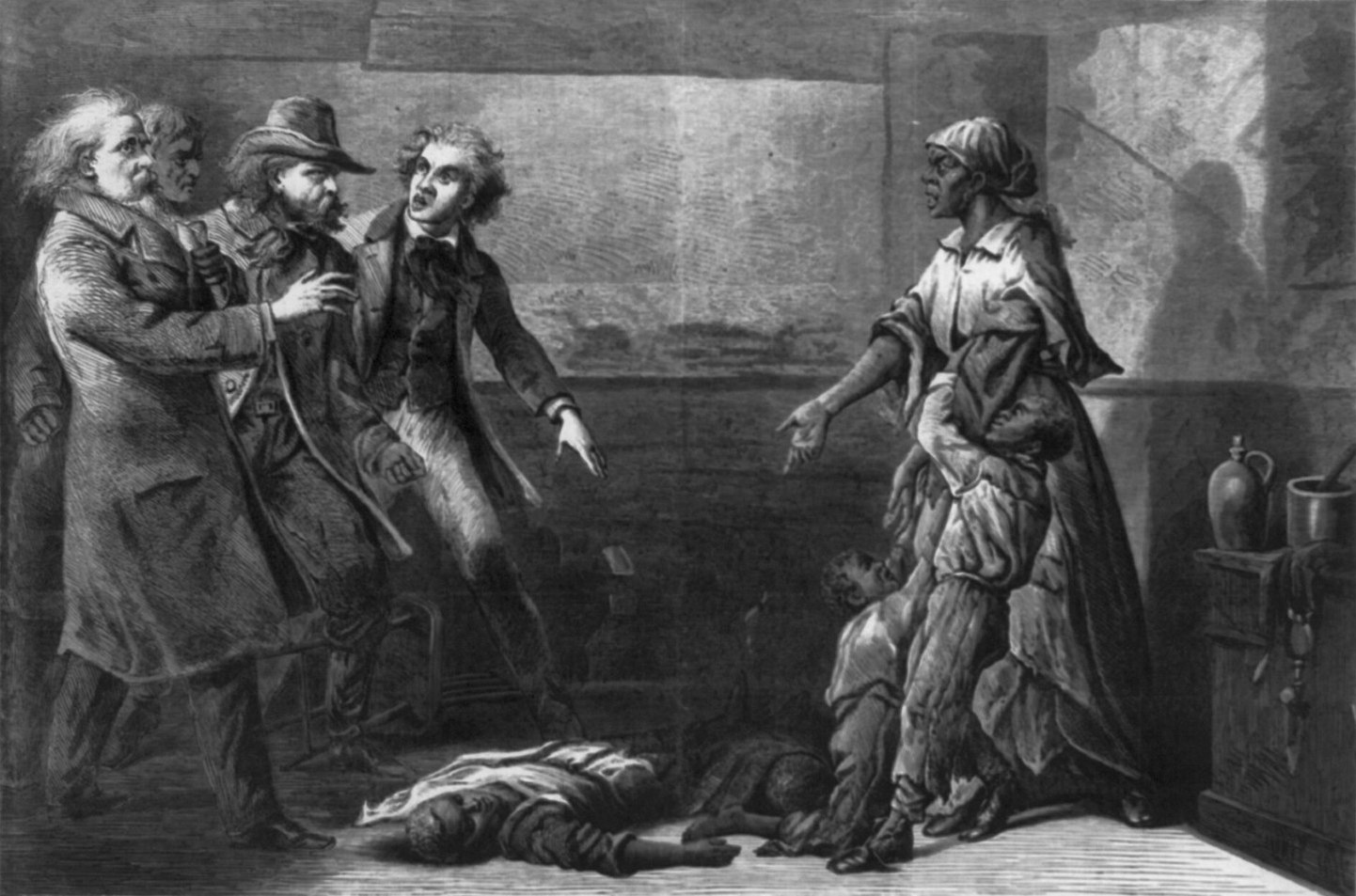
The Modern Medea (1867), an illustration of Margaret Garner, an escaped enslaved African American who in 1856, about to be captured, killed her daughter, Mary, to ensure Mary was not returned to slavery

Partus sequitur ventrem (lit. 'that which is born follows the womb'; also partus) was a legal doctrine passed in colonial Virginia in December 1662 and other English crown colonies in the Americas which defined the legal status of children born there; the doctrine mandated that children of enslaved mothers would inherit the legal status of their mothers. As such, children of enslaved women would be born into slavery. The legal doctrine of partus sequitur ventrem was derived from Roman civil law, specifically the portions concerning slavery and personal property (chattels), as well as the common law of personal property; analogous legislation existed in other civilizations including Medieval Egypt in Africa and Korea in Asia.

The doctrine's most significant effect was placing into chattel slavery all children born to enslaved women. Partus sequitur ventrem soon spread from the colony of Virginia to all of the Thirteen Colonies. As a function of the political economy of chattel slavery in Colonial America, the legalism of partus sequitur ventrem exempted the biological father from relationship toward children he fathered with enslaved women, and gave all rights in the children to the slave-owner. The denial of paternity to enslaved children secured the slaveholder's right to profit from exploiting the labour of children engendered, bred, and born into slavery. The doctrine also meant that multiracial children with white mothers were born free. Early generations of free Negros in the American South were formed from unions between free working-class, usually mixed race women, and black men.

Similar legal doctrines of inheritable slavery also derived from the civil law, operated in all the various European colonies in the Americas and Africa which were established by the British, Spanish, Portuguese, French, or Dutch, and these doctrines often carried over after the colonies became independent.

== History ==
=== Background ===
Cultures as diverse as Egypt, in Africa, and Korea, in Asia, have had the rule that the children of enslaved women are born slaves themselves; towards the end of the first millennium AD, most slaves in Egypt were born to enslaved women. A few years later, in 1036, Korea passed legislation whereby the children of slaves were also born slaves.

In 1619, a group of "twenty and odd" Negroes were landed in the Colony of Virginia, marking the beginning of the importation of Africans into England's colonies in continental North America. They had been captured from a Portuguese slaver, the Portuguese having begun the Atlantic slave trade a century earlier. During the colonial era, English colonial administration struggled to determine the status of the children born in the colonies, where their births were the product of a union between an English subject and a "foreigner", or entirely between foreigners. English common law mandated that the legal place or status of an English subject's children was based on that of their father as the head of the household, known as pater familias. Common law stipulated that men were legally required to acknowledge their bastard children in addition to their legal ones and give them food and shelter—while they also had the right to put their children to work or hire them out taking any earnings, or arranging an apprenticeship or indenture so that they could become a self-supporting adult. Child labor was a critical benefit both to the family headed by a father in England, and to the development of England's colonies—the child was as property to the father, or to those who stood in place of the father, but the child grew out of that condition as the child came of age.

Regarding personal property (chattels), common law mandated that the profits and increase generated by personal property (livestock, mobile property) accrued to the owner of the chattel property. Beginning in the Virginia royal colony in 1662, colonial governments incorporated the legal doctrine of partus sequitur ventrem into the laws of slavery, ruling that the children born in the colonies took the place or status of their mothers; therefore, children of enslaved mothers were born into slavery as chattel, regardless of the status of their fathers. The doctrine existed in English common law (which agreed with the civil law in such matters as livestock), but in England, the partus sequitur ventrem doctrine did not make chattels of English subjects.

In 1656, multiracial woman Elizabeth Key Grinstead, then classified by an owner's estate as being "Negro" and thus enslaved, won her freedom lawsuit and legal recognition as a free woman of color in colonial Virginia. Key's successful lawsuit was based upon the circumstances of her birth: her English father was a member of the House of Burgesses; had acknowledged his paternity of Elizabeth, who was baptized as a Christian in the Church of England; and, before his death, had arranged a guardianship for her, by way of indentured servitude until she came of age. When the man to whom Key was indentured returned to England, he sold her indenture contract to a second man. The latter prolonged Key's servitude beyond the indenture's original term. At the death of the second owner of her indenture, his estate classified Elizabeth Key and her mixed-race son (who also had a white father, William Grinstead) as "Negro slaves" who were the personal property of the deceased. With William acting as her attorney, Elizabeth sued the estate over her status, claiming that she was an indentured servant who had served past her term and that her son was thus freeborn. This was eventually accepted by the Virginia General Court, though it overturned the decision after an appeal from the estate. Elizabeth took the case to the Virginia General Assembly, which accepted her arguments.

According to scholar Taunya Lovell Banks,

children born to English parents outside the country became English subjects at birth, others could become "naturalized subjects" (although there was no process at the time in the colonies). What was unsettled was the status of children if only one of the parents was an English subject, as foreigners (including Africans) were not considered subjects. Because non-whites came to be denied civil rights as foreigners, mixed-race people seeking freedom often had to stress their English ancestry (and later, European).

In December 1662, the Virginia General Assembly passed an act titled "Negro womens children to serve according to the condition of the mother." Its preamble stated that "some doubts have [arisen] whether children got by any Englishman upon a negro woman should be slave or [free]," and it resolved the question by declaring "that all children borne in this country [shall be] held bond or free only according to the condition of the mother." The same act also stated that any Christian who committed fornication with a Black man or woman would pay double the fines imposed by an earlier act. The editors of Encyclopedia Virginia describe the act as a reversal of the common-law presumption that a child's status followed the father's, and as one that enabled slaveholders to reproduce their own labor force.

After the American Revolution, slave law in the United States continued to maintain such distinctions. Virginia established a law that no one could be enslaved in the state other than those who had that status on October 17, 1785, "and the descendants of the females of them." Kentucky adopted this law in 1798; Mississippi passed a similar law in 1822, using the phrase about females and their descendants, as did Florida in 1828. Louisiana, whose legal system was based on civil law (following its French colonial past), in 1825 added this language to its code: "Children born of a mother then in a state of slavery, whether married or not, follow the condition of their mother." Other states adopted this "norm" through judicial rulings. In summary, the legal doctrine of partus sequitur ventrem functioned economically to provide a steady supply of slaves.

=== Mixed-race slaves ===
By the 18th century, the colonial slave population included mixed-race children of white ancestry, sometimes classified as mulattoes (half Black), quadroons (one-quarter Black), and octoroons (one-eighth Black). They were fathered by white planters, overseers, and other men with power, with enslaved women and girls who were also sometimes of mixed race.

Numerous multiracial enslaved people lived in stable families at the Monticello plantation of Thomas Jefferson. In 1773 his wife, Martha Wayles, inherited more than one hundred enslaved people from her father John Wayles. These included the six mixed-race children (identified as being three-quarters white) whom he fathered with his enslaved concubine Betty Hemings, a multiracial woman born of an Englishman and an enslaved African (Black) woman. Martha Wayles's three-quarters white ("quadroon") half-brothers and half-sisters included the much younger Sally Hemings. Some years later, it is believed the widower Jefferson took Sally Hemings (then between 14 and 16 years of age) as a concubine. Over 38 years, he may have sired six children with her, four of whom survived to adulthood. As their mother was enslaved, they, too, were enslaved from birth.

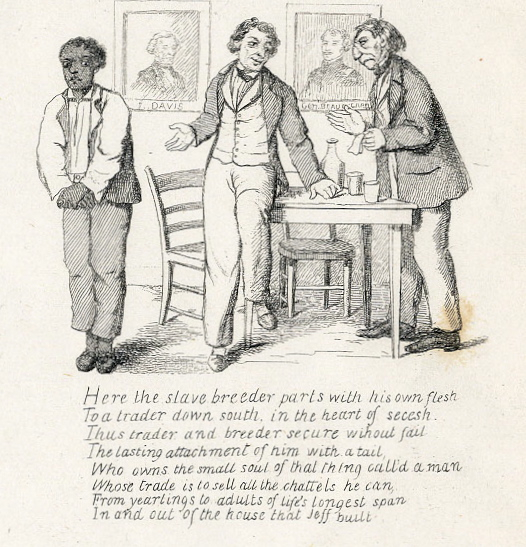
A slave-trader sells his mixed-race relative into slavery. (The House that Jeff Built, David Claypoole Johnston, 1863)

Under Virginia law at the time, being seven-eighths European ("octoroon") would have made the Jefferson–Hemings children legally white if they had been free. Jefferson allowed the two eldest to "escape" and freed the two youngest in his will. As adults, three Jefferson–Hemings children passed into white society: Beverly and Harriet Hemings in the Washington, D.C., area, and Eston Hemings Jefferson in Wisconsin. Eston had married a mixed-race woman in Virginia, and both their sons served as regular Union soldiers. The elder son gained the rank of colonel.

In 1998, a Y-DNA test confirmed that a contemporary male descendant of Sally Hemings (through Eston Heming's descendants) shared genetic relation in the male line with Field Jefferson, a paternal uncle of Thomas Jefferson which provides evidence that Thomas may have been the biological father of Eston Heming Jefferson. Thomas Jefferson is documented as having been at Monticello each time Hemings conceived, and the historical evidence favors his paternity, but there are other possible suspects such as his younger brother Randolph.

=== Brazil and the Free Womb Law of 1871 ===
The partus sequitur ventrem was part of the laws that regulated the Brazilian slavery system. The law said that any offspring born from the slaves after the Free Womb Law would not be considered slaves. There were issues with regards to freedom and the condition of those children whose mothers had conceived before the passing of the law.

There was a problem in trying to distinguish between the free womb, the slave womb, and the conditional womb for the Brazilian lawmakers and lawyers. After the enactment of the law, there were many cases of slaves filing suits for freedom through kinship.

== Mixed-race communities in the Deep South ==
In the colonial cities on the Gulf of Mexico, New Orleans, Savannah, and Charleston, there arose the Creole peoples as a social class of educated free people of color, descended from white fathers and enslaved black or mixed-race women. As a class, they intermarried, sometimes gained formal education, and owned property, including enslaved people. Moreover, in the Upland South, some slaveholders freed their slaves after the Revolution through manumission. The population of free black men and free black women rose from less than 1% in 1780 to more than 10% in 1810, when 7.2% of Virginia's population was free black people, and 75% of Delaware's black population was free.

Concerning the sexual hypocrisy related to whites and their sexual abuse of enslaved women, the diarist Mary Boykin Chesnut said:

This only I see: like the patriarchs of old our men live all in one house with their wives and their concubines, the Mulattoes one sees in every family exactly resemble the white children—every lady tells you who is the father of all the Mulatto children in every body's household, but those [Mulatto children] in her own [household], she seems to think drop from the clouds or pretends so to think ...

Likewise, in the Journal of a Residence on a Georgia Plantation in 1838–1839 (1863), Fanny Kemble, the English wife of an American planter, noted the immorality of white slaveholders who kept their mixed-race children enslaved.

But some white fathers established common-law marriages with enslaved women. They emancipated the woman and children, or sometimes transferred property to them, arranged apprenticeships and education, and resettled in the North. Some white fathers paid for the higher education of their mixed-race children at colour-blind colleges, such as Oberlin College. In 1860 Ohio, at Wilberforce University (est. 1855) owned and operated by the African Methodist Episcopal church, most of the two hundred subscribed students were mixed-race, natural sons of the white men paying their tuition.

== See also ==
- Children of the plantation
- Enslaved women's resistance in the United States and Caribbean
- Female slavery in the United States
- Freedom of wombs
- History of sexual slavery in the United States
- Marriage of enslaved people (United States)
- One-drop rule
- Rio Branco Law
- Sally Miller (American slave)
- Slave breeding in the United States
- Slave Trade Act

== Bibliography ==
- Bruning, Jelle (2020). "Slave Trade Dynamics in Abbasid Egypt: The Papyrological Evidence". Journal of the Economic and Social History of the Orient. 63 (5–6). Brill Publishers: 689–690. doi:10.1163/15685209-12341524. hdl:1887/3133408. ISSN 0022-4995.
