= Freedom suit =

Enslaved persons' lawsuits for freedom

An animation showing when United States territories and states forbade or allowed slavery, 1789–1861

Freedom suits were lawsuits in the Thirteen Colonies and the United States filed by slaves against slaveholders to assert claims to freedom, often based on descent from a free maternal ancestor, or time held as a resident in a free state or territory.

The right to petition for freedom descended from English common law and allowed people to challenge their enslavement or indenture. Petitioners challenged slavery both directly and indirectly, even if slaveholders generally viewed such petitions as a means to uphold rather than undermine slavery. Beginning with the colonies in North America, legislatures enacted slave laws that created a legal basis for "just subjection"; these were adopted or updated by the state and territorial legislatures that superseded them after the United States gained independence. These codes also enabled enslaved persons to sue for freedom based on wrongful enslavement.

While some cases were tried during the colonial period, the majority of petitions for freedom were heard during the antebellum period in the border or the Southern United States. After the American Revolution, most northern states abolished slavery and were considered "free". The United States Congress prohibited slavery in some newly established territories, and some new states were admitted to the union as free states. The rise in travel and migration of masters with slaves between free and slave states resulted in conditions that gave rise to slaves suing for freedom. Many free states had residency limits for masters who brought slaves into their territory; after that time, the slave would be considered free. Some slaves sued for wrongful enslavement after being held in a free state.

Other grounds for suit were that the person was freeborn and illegally held in slavery, or that the person was illegally held because of being descended from a freeborn woman in the maternal line. The principle of partus sequitur ventrem, first incorporated into Virginian law by a 1662 statute in the House of Burgesses, established that children's status was that of the mother. It was also adopted into law by all of the Southern colonies, and later the slave states of the United States.

In Saint Louis, Missouri, records of nearly 300 petition cases have been found that were filed between 1807 and 1860, and in Washington, D.C., nearly 500 petition cases were filed in the same period. A large portion of cases, as much as one-third, either never went to trial or were settled out of court. In the early nineteenth century in St. Louis and in Washington, D.C., nearly half of the attorneys at the bar may have acted as counsel for slave petitions. In Missouri, the courts assigned an attorney to the petitioner if it accepted a freedom suit for hearing; some of the top attorneys in St. Louis represented slaves. After the 1830s, the number of petition cases gradually declined. But from 1800 to 1830, most of the bar in these cities tried a petition case.

Before the end of the eighteenth century, some southern states began to make petitioning for freedom more difficult. Maryland, for example, in 1796 required that county courts serve as the court of original jurisdiction, rather than the General Court of the Western Shore, an appellate court. The county courts clearly would be more favorable to the interests and views of the local planters against whom these suits were often filed. The legislature also banned persons with known antislavery sympathies from serving on juries in freedom suits. Virginia passed a similar law on jury composition in 1798.

But, for a few decades, courts in slave states such as Louisiana, Mississippi, and Missouri often respected the precedent of "once free, always free" established by free states. Until the early 1850s, they ruled that slaves who had been held in free states maintained their freedom even if brought back into slave states.

Until the Civil War brought an end to slavery, thousands of freedom suits were tried in state courts across the country, with some slaves petitioning as high as the Supreme Court.

== History ==
=== Colonial petitions for freedom ===
The act of writing petitions asking the courts for freedom has been a practice within North America dating back to the late 1600s. Some of the first petitions for freedom were not directed at the courts, but to the various colonial joint stock companies, such as the Dutch West India Company, which operated in the Northeast and mid-Atlantic area. During the early importation of enslaved laborers, the West India Company had no strict laws governing their status and condition. Enslaved persons were allowed to marry and raise families as long as they continued to work for the company. In this regard, many early petitions were by slaves attempting to obtain freedom on behalf of their nuclear families. In the antebellum period, enslaved women were instrumental in seeking freedom to protect their children, and because their status determined that of their children.

One of the earliest petitions on record dates to 1644. A group of eleven petitioners, not including their children, entreated the Council of New Netherland for freedom, based on the claim that it was impossible for them to support their growing families under slavery. The Dutch West India Company released these slaves on a plan of half-freedom; this allowed slaves their liberty in exchange for payment of an annual tributary to the company, and a settlement of African-owned farms developed north of the wall of New Amsterdam. During early America and the first two decades of the colonial period, slavery had not become a racial caste within the area of Dutch authority. The Dutch West India Company freed many slaves between 1644 and 1664, when they lost control of their colony to England. These early petitioners did not base their claim for freedom on ethnicity but on the monetary realities of living in slavery and caring for a family. This line of argument quickly faded from the records.

In 1655, a Virginia court ruled in Johnson v. Casor that John Casor was a slave, and not—as he claimed—an indentured servant, of Anthony Johnson, a free Black man.

In English North America, the colonists considered Africans to be "foreigners" and unable to become English subjects due to being non-Christians. Even after African slaves began to be converted to Christianity in the colonies, their race was used as a justification to override that status. In 1662, Virginia enacted a law that children born in the colony assumed their mother's social status; therefore, children of enslaved mothers were born into slavery, and children of free English subjects were born free. This was contrary to English common law, in which the father's social status determined that of the child. The law was passed after Elizabeth Key, a mixed race woman, had filed for freedom based on her having an English father, who had her baptized as a Christian, and had arranged a guardianship for her and limited indenture before his death. She was held longer and classified as a slave in an estate. She gained her freedom in court in 1656.

This principle from Roman law, known as partus sequitur ventrem, became part of colonial Virginian law and was soon adopted by the rest of the Southern Colonies. But the law also meant that children of free white women and Native American women (after Indian slavery was abolished) were born free, even if they were mixed race (Virginia abolished Indian slavery in 1705). Mixed-race descendants of Indian or white women struggled to gain freedom by suing based on their maternal lines. Petitioners focused primarily on proving their right to liberty through hereditary freedom claims.

=== Suits for freedom during and after the Revolution ===
During the years leading to the Revolutionary War, there was a rise in freedom suits submitted in Northern states such as Connecticut, Massachusetts, and New Hampshire. Many of these cases referred to the highly significant English case of Somerset v Stewart (1772). The ruling in the Somerset case held that slavery was inhumane and illegal on British soil. Lord Mansfield's opinion in the case was widely read and commented on in the colonies. Slavery, Lord Mansfield ruled, had no basis in "natural law" and could only be maintained through "positive law". As slavery had never been enacted by English law, it did not legally exist in England and no person on English soil could be held in bondage. Slaves in Virginia and Maryland learned of the Somerset decision. In the months and years following, petitioners used it as a weapon against enslavement.

Sir William Blackstone, the leading authority on English law and a professor at the University of Oxford, had already published his Commentaries on the Laws of England, in which he laid down the most complete argument to date that slavery was incompatible with free societies. Although admitting that slavery might have a legal basis in the colonial plantation societies of the Atlantic world, Blackstone wrote,

pure and proper slavery does not, nay cannot, subsist in England; such I mean, whereby an absolute and unlimited power is given to the master over the life and fortune of the slave. And indeed it is repugnant to reason, and the principles of natural law, that such a state should subsist any where.

On January 6, 1773, black petitioners submitted the first of five appeals written during the year, asking for a range of rights, to Governor Hutchinson and the General Court of Massachusetts. Though signed only by a slave named Felix, the document petitioned for the freedom and rights of all slaves in the Massachusetts colony. While the tone of the petition is cautious, it speaks to the "unhappy State and Condition" in which enslaved persons are forced to live. Abolitionists later published the petition as a pamphlet, along with letters and other abolitionist documents. Felix's petition expressed the talk of freedom, liberty, and the pursuit of happiness that was circulating around Massachusetts and other American colonies before the American Revolution. No record of a response from the Massachusetts General Court exists. Although slavery was never explicitly abolished or prohibited in the new Massachusetts Constitution after the Revolutionary War, rulings in freedom suits by Mum Bett and Quock Walker established that its representation of rights was incompatible with slavery, and remaining slaves effectively gained their freedom.

With the outbreak of war, thousands of enslaved blacks gained freedom during the Revolution. Enslaved persons during these years found their freedom through military service, petitions for freedom, and manumissions by colonists who believed that "every man is created equal" and manumitted their slaves. By the end of the war, more than 5,000 enslaved African Americans had survived their military service with the Continental Army and joined the new America as free men, vastly increasing the number of free black people in the newly formed states.

== United States Constitution ==
After much discussion about slavery, delegates from northern and southern states reached a compromise, drafting a federal constitution for the United States that prohibited Federal banning of the slave trade for two decades; Article V effectively protected the trade until 1808, giving the States 20 years to resolve this issue. Although northerners hoped that slavery would decline, during that time, planters in states of the Lower South imported tens of thousands of slaves, more than during any previous two decades in colonial history. As further protection for slavery, the delegates approved Section 2 of Article IV, which prohibited states from freeing slaves who fled to them from another state, and required the return of chattel property to owners.

During the years after the Revolution, from 1780 to 1804 Pennsylvania, Connecticut, New Hampshire, Rhode Island, New York, and New Jersey created abolition plans that ended legal slavery in these states by 1809, often on a gradual basis by first freeing children born to enslaved mothers, and gradually freeing enslaved adults. In New York the last slaves were not freed until 1827.

Also moved by revolutionary ideals, legislators in Southern states enacted manumission laws that made it easier for slaveholders to free their slaves, under certain circumstances. Maryland's 1796 law was typical: slaveholders were allowed to manumit only healthy enslaved people under the age of 45 who would not become a public charge. During the first two decades after the war, planters freed numerous slaves, particularly in the Upper South, where economies and crops were already changing. In the Upper South, the proportion of free blacks went from less than one percent of all blacks to more than 10 percent, even as the total number of slaves was increasing through importation.

The presence of an increased number of free people of color (free blacks), particularly in the North and Upper South, altered the prevailing racial categories. By 1810, 75 percent of all African Americans in the North were free. By 1840, virtually all African Americans in the North were free. Previously the color of one's skin was highly associated with slavery, black (or ethnic African) indicating enslaved and white indicating free. After the Revolution, when tens of thousands of African Americans gained their freedom, either by having volunteered or being manumitted, racial enslavement appeared inconsistent. Free blacks subverted the logic of racially based enslavement.

After invention of the cotton gin made profitable the processing of short-staple cotton, there was a major push by whites to develop lands in the Deep South for such cultivation. This greatly increased the demand for slave labor, especially after the US ended the legal Atlantic slave trade in 1808. The rate of manumission fell sharply in southern states. Through the domestic slave trade, some one million slaves were transported from the Upper South to the Deep South in the following years. Most southern states also tightened restrictions on manumission, effectively ending it. They enacted laws requiring legislative approval for each act of manumission, making it so difficult that few slaveholders pursued this, even for their own mixed-race children. At the same time African Americans attempted to resist racialized definitions of freedom. Petitions for freedom suits were one of the most powerful strategies to redefine racial categories, claim freedom, and reconstitute families in the face of enslavement.

== Arguments for freedom ==
Petitions for freedom were lawsuits filed by enslaved persons against slaveholders asserting their right to freedom. The right to petition for freedom descended from English common law and allowed people to challenge their enslavement or indenture. While some cases were tried during the colonial period, the majority of petitions for freedom were heard during the antebellum period. Petitioners used a variety of arguments to obtain their freedom.

=== Familial descent from a free woman ===
In 1662, Virginia enacted a law to determine the status of children born in the colony. It stated that children inherited the status of the mother, in contrast to English common law in England, which held that a child's social status was determined by the father. Other Southern colonies followed Virginia's lead and adopted this principle of partus sequitur ventrem, by which a child of an enslaved mother was born into slavery, regardless of the race or status of the father. As time went on, there were numerous generations of mixed-race slaves, some notable for being majority white, as were Sally Hemings and several of her siblings at Monticello. These six were the children of the planter John Wayles, father-in-law of Thomas Jefferson.

But this law also resulted in mixed-race children of white women being born into freedom. Virginia and other colonies ended Indian slavery in the early 18th century. Spain ended Indian slavery in colonial areas under its rule in 1769. After those changes, petitioners sometimes based their claim to freedom on descent from an Indian woman in a slave's maternal line.

Dozens of petitions for freedom were filled on the basis that the petitioner was descended from a free woman, and so, by law, was entitled to freedom. For an example of a freedom suit based upon the free status of a mother, see John Davis v. Hezekiah Wood, the Circuit Court of the District of Columbia. In another case filed soon after the United States completed the Louisiana Purchase, Marguerite Scypion and her sisters petitioned in 1805 in Saint Louis, Missouri, for freedom from slavery for them and their children, based on descent from a free Native American grandmother.

=== Manumission ===
Petitioners for freedom often claimed that a promised manumission had not been fully executed. Charlotte Dupuy, a domestic slave of Henry Clay, in 1829 filed a freedom suit for her and her two children while they were living with Clay in Washington, D.C., during his service as Secretary of State. Dupuy claimed that her previous master had promised to free her. The court required Clay to leave Dupuy in the capital until the case was settled, although he had completed his service and was returning to Kentucky. Dupuy was assigned to work for Clay's successor, Martin Van Buren, who paid her wages like a free laborer. The court ultimately ruled against Dupuy and she was returned to Clay in Kentucky. He finally freed her and her daughter ten years later, and her grown son later still.

Beginning in the 1790s after the Revolution, slaveholders manumitted an unprecedented number of African Americans in Maryland and Virginia. Historians have explained the numerous manumissions in three ways: as a consequence of Revolutionary ideals, religious fervor, and depressed crop prices in the Upper South decreasing the need for labor. In addition, changes in types of crops, from tobacco to mixed crops, had decreased the need for labor.

But historians of Maryland have examined wills and deeds of manumission and found that only a small percentage (under 5%) mention revolutionary ideals as a motivation. Masters sometimes freed slaves for "loyal service". Religious motivations were also seldom noted. Instead, in some cases slaveholders used manumission as a tool to maintain a varied labor force, retaining and controlling labor under a system related to indenture. With as much as two-thirds of manumissions in Maryland structured as "term slavery", African Americans contested many of these arrangements, some of them in the courts. For an example of a freedom suit with a dispute over "term slavery", see Lizette Lee et al. v. Augustus Preuss and related cases, Circuit Court of the District of Columbia.

=== Sale or illegal importation ===
States passed numerous laws to regulate the slave trade and the status of persons. Under the Act of Assembly of Virginia Act of 1785, Chapter 77, enslaved persons who were born in another state and brought into Virginia after the date of the act would be freed after spending one year in the state. The act provided an exception, stating that if a slaveholder were to bring slaves into Virginia, he had to make an oath within 60 days of his arrival that he had not imported his slaves from out of the country, and had not brought them into Virginia with the intention of selling them.

Under Maryland Act of Assembly 1796, Chapter 67, any enslaved person brought into the state by an owner for the purpose of sale, would be granted freedom. A proviso stated that any person who intended to settle in Maryland was lawfully able to import his slaves from out of state so long as his slaves remained in the state for three years. If they were removed from the state before the three years had elapsed, the slaves would be granted freedom. Along with creating legal opportunities for slaves to gain freedom, the 1796 Maryland Act of Assembly also secured for petitioners in freedom suits the right "to have the benefit of a trial by jury." With this right, enslaved persons were given the power to petition their owners in court based on being illegally transported into or out of the state.

Many petitions for freedom were filed based upon violations of these acts governing the transport of enslaved persons across state lines. For an example of such a freedom suit, see Matilda Derrick v. George Mason & Alexander Moore in the Circuit Court of the District of Columbia. In 1840 Solomon Northup, a free black, was persuaded to go with some new acquaintances from Saratoga Springs, New York to Washington, D.C., on the promise of work with a circus. There he was drugged, kidnapped and imprisoned east of the Potomac by a slave trader. He was beaten to keep quiet and transported to the Deep South by ship to be sold again as a slave in Louisiana. After 12 years he finally got word to friends and was freed by an attorney representing the New York state government. Because the jurisdictions could not agree on where the crimes took place, his kidnappers were never prosecuted.

=== Travel or residency in a free state or territory ===
After the Revolution, northern states abolished slavery, and the United States became divided into free and slave states. In addition, Congress established some new territories as free, and as new states were admitted to the Union, they determined whether they would allow slavery. With the development of western territories, there was an expanded amount of travel and migration by masters accompanied by slaves between slave states and free ones. In addition, some military personnel had slaves and took them on assignment into free territories.

Pennsylvania abolished slavery and enacted legislation that after six months' residency, slaves brought into the state by slaveholders were entitled to their freedom. This law was applied to the members of the new federal government that was temporarily established in Philadelphia. Many of its members were slaveholders, including Southern legislators and administration appointees, as well as President George Washington. He was known to arrange to have his slaves taken out of the state temporarily before the six-month limit in order to avoid the residency requirement and risk their gaining freedom. At least two slaves from his household escaped to freedom in the North. Washington eventually replaced his domestic slaves by hiring German immigrants as servants to avoid the problem.

Some freedom suits were filed by slaves temporarily in New York and Massachusetts because of similar laws giving freedom to slaves brought into these states by their masters. Massachusetts began to rule that slaves whose masters brought them voluntarily into the state gained freedom immediately upon entering the state. Anti-slavery groups in Pennsylvania, New York and Massachusetts were on the alert to aid slaves who were brought into the free states and wanted to gain freedom. They conducted some daring rescues, often hiding slaves, testifying for them in court, or sometimes helping them reach Canada in order to be beyond the reach of slave catchers and, after 1850, the provisions of the Fugitive Slave Act.

By 1824, the courts in Missouri established the precedent of "once free, always free", ruling that slaves taken voluntarily by masters into free states gained their freedom according to those states' laws, and could not be returned to slavery if the master brought the person to the slave state of Missouri. In addition, in freedom suits, "[c]ourts in Kentucky, Louisiana and Mississippi also upheld the freedom of slaves who had lived in a free state or territory."

== Filing suit ==
Recognizing the growing number of manumissions and petition cases after the Revolution, most southern states began to make petitioning more difficult. For example, in 1796, Maryland required that county courts serve as the court of original jurisdiction for petition for freedom cases, rather than the General Court of the Western Shore, an appellate court. The county courts were considered to be more favorable to the interests and views of local planters against whom these suits were often filed. That year, Maryland passed a law banning persons of known anti-slavery sympathies from serving on juries in freedom suits. Virginia enacted a similar law in 1798.

Thousands of petition cases were tried in state courts across the country. In Saint Louis, Missouri, records for nearly 300 petition cases have been found that were filed between 1807 and 1860. In Washington, D.C., nearly 500 petition cases were filed in the same period. Often jurors decided in favor of the enslaved. Slaves gained freedom in 37 percent of the cases in Saint Louis. A large portion of cases, as much as one-third, either never went to trial or were settled out of court.

To file petitions for freedom, enslaved plaintiffs demonstrated an impressive knowledge of their rights and an equally impressive sense of calculated risk. For the most part, persistence paid off, and petitioners who filed multiple suits were more likely to eventually succeed. Petitioners retained preeminent attorneys; in Washington, D.C., they included Francis Scott Key, Richard Ridgely, John Law, William Wirt, Gabriel Duvall, and John Johnson. In St. Louis, if the court accepted a freedom suit, it assigned an attorney for the slave petitioner. Among the notable attorneys representing slaves in St. Louis were Edward Bates, future Attorney General under President Abraham Lincoln; and Hamilton Gamble, future Chief Justice of the Missouri Supreme Court. During the early nineteenth century in St. Louis and in Washington, D.C., nearly half of the attorneys at the bar may have acted as counsel for slave petitions. After the 1830s, the number of petition cases gradually declined and the number of attorneys in the cities increased. But from 1800 to 1830, most of the bar in these cities tried a petition case.

== Applicable laws ==
=== 1662 Virginia Act of Assembly ===
- In 1662 Virginia enacted a law that defined the social status of children born in the colony by the status of the mother; thus, children born to enslaved women were born into slavery.

Whereas some doubts have arisen whether children got by any Englishman upon a Negro woman should be slave or free, be it therefore enacted and declared by this present Grand Assembly, that all children born in this country shall be held bond or free only according to the condition of the mother; and that if any Christian shall commit fornication with a Negro man or woman, he or she so offending shall pay double the fines imposed by the former act.

- This 1662 law incorporated the Roman principle of partus sequitur ventrem, referred to as partus, which held that a child inherited the status of its mother, "bond or free". This law hardened the racial caste of slavery, as most of the "bondswomen" were ethnic Africans and considered foreigners. The principle was adopted by all of the Southern colonies, and later incorporated into slavery law by the slave states of the United States.
- At the same time, this law meant that mixed-race children born to white women were free. Paul Heinegg, in his Free African Americans in Virginia, North Carolina, South Carolina, Maryland and Delaware (1995–2005) has traced the majority of families of free people of color listed on the censuses of 1790–1810 in the Upper South, to families formed in colonial Virginia from unions between white women and African or African-American men among the working class, where free, indentured servants and slaves lived and worked closely. While illegitimate mixed-race children of white mothers were bound to lengthy terms as apprentices, they still had gained the important status of free birth. All the women's descendants were free.

=== 1785 Virginia Act of Assembly ===
- Under the Virginia Act of Assembly of 1785, enslaved persons who were born in another state and brought into Virginia would be freed after one year in the state. Petitions for Freedom, on the basis of this law, were brought to the county courts in Virginia and the District of Columbia by slaves against owners who had held them in the state longer than the term permitted.

=== 1795 Virginia Act of Assembly ===
- Within Chapter 11 of the Virginia Act of Assembly, a number of acts were made law in order to consolidate and strengthen the regulations associated with a slave's right to petition for freedom in the state. Any person who believed himself or herself to be illegally detained was given the right to make a complaint in court, order the clerk to issue a warrant summoning the owner, and be provided with an appointed legal counsel who, without fee, would prosecute the suit. In addition to further outlining the right of enslaved persons in the courts, the new laws also enacted stricter penalties against persons who were found illegally aiding slaves in trying to achieve freedom. Any person in the state of Virginia found abetting, making, forging, or counterfeiting materials for use in court by a slave attempting to win their freedom was sentenced to suffer one year's imprisonment without bail. While the laws did create a space for the illegally enslaved to file suits for freedom, it isolated the enslaved from persons with the power and means to assist their cases.

=== 1796 Maryland Act of Assembly ===
- Through the 1796 Maryland Act of Assembly, enslaved persons were given more opportunities to gain freedom; but, in the same document, the rights of free blacks were reduced. Under the law any slave brought into the state for the purpose of sale by the owner, would be granted freedom. A proviso stated that any person intending to settle in Maryland was lawfully able to import his slaves from out of state as long as his slaves remained in the state for three years. If the slaves were removed from the state before three years, they would be granted freedom. Along with creating legal opportunities for slaves to gain freedom, the 1796 Maryland Act of Assembly also secured petitions the right "to have the benefit of a trial by jury". With this right, enslaved persons were given the power to petition their owners in court based on their illegal transport in or out of the state.

=== 1824 Missouri Law ===
Missouri updated its slave law in 1824, providing for the right of a petitioner to sue for their freedom.

== District of Columbia courts ==
Located to connect the northern and southern portions of the United States, Washington, D.C., provided a unique venue for freedom suits due to its blending of both Maryland and Virginia law. Because the District comprised portions of Maryland and Virginia, the laws of both states were in effect within those regions of Washington. The District was divided into two counties: the portion lying east of the Potomac River was known as the County of Washington; the other part called the County of Alexandria.

Since the capital's formation in 1790, slavery was legal and prominent. The District of Columbia was the center of the domestic slave trade during the eighteenth century due to its ports on the Potomac River. However, the number of slaves declined over the next five decades from approximately 6,400 slaves in 1820 to 3,100 by 1860. The population of free blacks grew, and by 1860, free blacks out-numbered slaves by four to one. It was a center of culture and politics for free blacks.

In a 1796 revision of Maryland's general code, a non-importation law was ratified to stop visitors from coming into the state and selling their slaves for speculative purposes. This law hindered slaveholders moving into Washington and Georgetown from areas outside of Maryland by requiring them to remain residents for three years before selling their slaves. A number of slaves in Washington, D.C., petitioned for and won their freedom based on owner violations of this Maryland enactment. These petitions were heard by the Circuit Court for the District of Columbia, consisting of one chief justice and two associate justices. Many judges who were later appointed to the US Supreme Court started in this lower court. Despite being a federal branch of the court system, the Circuit Court for the District of Columbia acted as both a lower and appellate court for nearby jurisdictions.

The papers of the Circuit Court for the District of Columbia are held by the National Archives. The digital project, O Say Can You See: Early Washington D.C., Law & Family, has collected and digitized several hundred freedom suits and thousands of case files dating between 1800 and 1862 for public use. It is intended to reveal the social world of African Americans in Washington, both free and enslaved. Users of the archived materials are able to explore the cases, people, families, and selected stories discovered by researchers.

== St. Louis, Missouri courts ==
Missouri was the "Gateway to the West" and a slave state, but it was bordered by free states, including Illinois. In addition, it was a center for military personnel who were traveling to assignments in free territories, such as in the current state of Minnesota, and who resettled in Missouri. The St. Louis circuit court heard hundreds of freedom suits. St. Louis developed its own network of people who supported slaves seeking freedom. Prominent attorneys were among those appointed as counsel by the court to argue for slaves seeking freedom. In 1824, the Missouri courts established the precedent known as "once free, always free", accommodating free states and territories that had established this principle, and freeing slaves in Missouri based on their having been held by their masters illegally in such free states or territories. This precedent was observed for decades until 1852 and the Dred Scott v. Sandford decision, which ruled that Scott should have filed for freedom while in a free state and before returning to Missouri.

A large corpus of freedom suits are available to researchers today in St. Louis and online. Some 301 files dating from 1814 to 1860 are among St. Louis Circuit Court Records discovered in the 1990s. The bulk of these suits were filed between 1820 and 1850. They are also available for study online. These records show that within Missouri, jurors often decided in favor of the enslaved. Freedom suit plaintiffs gained freedom in 37 percent of the cases filed in the St. Louis circuit court.

The first freedom suit in St. Louis was filed in 1805 by Marguerite Scypion, an African-Natchez woman. Scypion asserted that she was free because her mother, Marie-Jean Scypion, was Natchez, and the Spanish had ended Indian slavery in 1769. The case dragged on in the courts for decades. After an earlier ruling in her favor was overturned on appeal, Marguerite Scypion sued again in 1826. This suit named her then master, Jean Pierre Chouteau, as the defendant. He headed one of the most prominent fur trading families in the city. By her persistence, Scypion gained freedom for herself and all her mother's descendants in a trial settled by verdict in 1836. This decision was upheld by the US Supreme Court.

=== Notable individuals ===
- Edward Bates was a private practice attorney in St. Louis who later was appointed to serve as the United States Attorney General under President Abraham Lincoln. Although a slaveholder, Bates represented slaves in some freedom suits in St. Louis, including the case of the freed slave Polly Berry's daughter, who was still enslaved. After gaining her own freedom in 1843, Berry enlisted Edward Bates as her attorney in her daughter's case. Bates argued that, since Berry had been proved a free woman at the time of her daughter's birth, according to the principle of partus sequitur ventrem, the child was born free. The court ruled in their favor, and both mother and daughter were freed from slavery.
- Francis B. Murdoch was a freedom suit attorney who filed close to one-third of all freedom suit petitions in St. Louis. He worked with Edward Bates on the Lucy A. Delaney case, and is referred to as "Mr. Murdock" in her autobiography, From the Darkness Cometh the Light (1891). Soon after the freedom suits for Polly Wash and Lucy Berry (as they were called in the court cases), Murdoch secured freedom papers for Diana Cephas. His last and most famous freedom suit clients were Dred and Harriet Scott, whose petitions he filed in the Circuit Court of St. Louis County on April 6, 1846.
- Hamilton Gamble served as chief justice of the Missouri Supreme Court, and as provisional governor of Missouri during the Civil War. Earlier in his career, he was a lawyer who represented both slaves and slaveowners in freedom suits. He represented the enslaved plaintiff Marguerite Scypion in Marguerite v. Chouteau, but represented slaveowners in Rachel v. Walker and Julia v. McKinney. As chief justice, he was rigorous in upholding the constitutions of the United States and Missouri, and adhering to legal precedent in almost every case. For this reason, Gamble dissented when the Missouri Supreme Court decided to overturn precedent in Scott v. Emerson in 1852, ruling in favor of Dred Scott despite his own proslavery views.

== Notable United States cases ==
- 1656, Elizabeth Key v. Humphrey Higginson. Elizabeth Key filed the first freedom suit by a woman of African descent in the Virginia colony and won as a free woman of color. The mixed-race child of an enslaved black mother and white English planter Thomas Key, she sued for her freedom and that of her mixed-race infant son, John Grinstead, on the basis that her late father had been a free English subject, that she was a baptized Christian, and that she had served ten years past the term of her indenture. (Facing death, her father had arranged a guardian and indenture for her in an attempt to protect her.) In English common law, children of English subjects took the status of the father (partuus sequitur patrem). But, at this time Africans were considered foreigners and heathens and, as such, common law did not apply to them. At the time, common law did not contain any provisions for foreigners to become naturalized subjects. In the early years of the colony, the House of Burgesses was unsettled about the status of children born to an English subject and a foreigner. Taunya Lovell Banks suggests in her analysis that the issue of "subjecthood" was more important to the colonial authorities at the time than ideas about citizenship or race. After appeals, Elizabeth won her freedom and that of her son. In response, the colony changed the rules in 1662 about the status of children born to enslaved mothers, establishing that they were also enslaved, regardless of paternity.
- 1781, Brom and Bett v. Ashley. After the Revolution, Elizabeth Freeman (known also as Mum Bett), a slave in Massachusetts, filed for her freedom in the County Court of Great Barrington, Massachusetts. This case set a state precedent, based on the ruling that slavery was irreconcilable with the new state constitution of 1780. It was based on equality of persons, although the constitution did not specifically address slavery. This county court case was cited in the appeal of the more well-known case of Quock Walker v. Jennison (1783), heard at the Massachusetts Supreme Judicial Court, which effectively ended slavery in Massachusetts.
- 1806, Houlder Hudgins v. Jackey Wright. Jackey Wright in Virginia sued for freedom for her and her two children, based on descent from Native American women; Virginia had prohibited Indian slavery since 1705 (or 1691). George Wythe as Chancellor had ruled for the Wrights' freedom based on their appearance as white, and Hudgins' failure to prove that they were slaves. Secondly, he ruled on the basis of a "presumption of freedom", according to the 1776 Virginia Declaration of Rights. Houlder Hudgins appealed. The justices of the Court of Appeal, all slaveholders, held that the appellant had not proved any evidence of African maternal ancestry among the appellees, that they appeared white, and that the community considered their grandmother and great-grandmother to be Indians. They held that Virginia's Bill of Rights applied only to "free citizens and aliens", and could not be used to overturn "rights of property" in slaves. They ruled that the Wrights were free based on their recognized Indian maternal ancestry, as Indians had been legally free in the colony since 1705.
- 1805–1836, Marguerite Scypion v. Pierre Chouteau, Sr., St. Louis, Missouri. Marguerite, daughter of Marie Jean Scypion, an enslaved woman of Natchez-African descent, sued her first master Joseph Tayon's son François Tayon in 1805, soon after the US acquired the Louisiana Territory. (Tayon inherited her when his father died.) Her suit was based on her maternal descent from a Natchez maternal grandmother. She held that her own mother was illegally held as a slave after Spain abolished Indian slavery in its territories in 1769. Her children, including Marguerite, should have been considered free at birth and not born enslaved. This was the first freedom suit filed in St. Louis and was heard shortly after the US acquired the Louisiana Territory from France. Although the jury ruled in Scypion's favor, a higher territorial court overturned the decision.

After passage in 1824 of a Missouri state law related to the right of slaves to file freedom suits, in 1825 Scypion and her two sisters filed new petitions for freedom against their masters, by then Pierre Chouteau and two Tayon daughters. For such suits, the law gave slaves the standing of a free poor person, "with limited rights and privileges". The cases were combined under Marguerite Scypion's name. After their attorney successfully gained two changes of venue away from St. Louis for the trial, a unanimous jury in Jefferson County, Missouri, in 1836 decided in favor of the descendants of Marie Jean Scypion and officially ended Indian slavery in Missouri. The decision survived appeals to the State Supreme Court and the US Supreme Court in 1838.

- 1810, Queen v. Hepburn. In 1813 the United States Supreme Court heard the arguments for Mima and Louisa Queen of Washington, D.C., but did not grant freedom to the slaves. Chief Justice John Marshall wrote the opinion for the Supreme Court on the Mima Queen v. Hepburn case. He stated that, because the deposition asserting Mary Queen's status as an African slave was from an eyewitness, unlike the testimony claiming her free status, which was hearsay evidence, that the Supreme Court must uphold the D.C. Court's decision. Marshall's decision stood on the logic of property laws. By deeming the hearsay evidence inadmissible, he avoided the question of freedom. Not all of the justices, however, agreed with the decision; Gabriel Duvall, who previously represented Mima's relative Ned Queen in Maryland, dissented. He believed that hearsay evidence should be admitted as evidence and considered it to be critical testimony in petitions for freedom cases. The Queen v. Hepburn case is cited throughout American law for its establishment of "the hearsay rule".
- 1824, Winny v. Whitesides. This is the first freedom suit in Missouri to be taken to the newly established state supreme court. Winny had been held as a slave for years by her masters in the free state of Illinois; she filed for freedom after they moved to Missouri. The case marked the beginning of the "once free, always free" era in Missouri. The Missouri Supreme Court ruled that if a slave had been taken by masters into an area that prohibited slavery, that slave was free – even if later returned to a slave state, such as Missouri. Missouri established a precedent of enforcing the laws of neighboring free states and territories related to forfeiture of illegally held slaves. "Courts in Kentucky, Louisiana and Mississippi also upheld the freedom of slaves who had lived in a free state or territory." The precedent prevailed in Missouri until 1852, when the state Supreme Court ruled against it in Dred Scott v. Sanford, against a political background of increasing sectional tensions over slavery.
- 1830, Charlotte Dupuy v. Henry Clay. While living in Washington, D.C., in 1829 slave Charlotte Dupuy sued her master Henry Clay of Kentucky, who was retiring as Secretary of State, for her freedom and that of her two children, based on a promise by a previous master. The case received wide attention in the press because of Clay's public position. Dupuy gained a court ruling that she remain in the city until her case was heard. She earned wages from Clay's successor, Martin Van Buren, while living at Decatur House for 18 months. The case was notable for these circumstances. After the court ruled against Dupuy in 1830, Clay kept Charlotte and her daughter enslaved for another decade; and her son for four years after that. He eventually freed them all. The Decatur House, now a historic site, has had exhibits on urban slavery and Dupuy's case. The story of the Dupuy family is also featured at the Isaac Scott Hathaway Museum of Lexington, Kentucky.
- 1834, Rachel v. Walker. Surviving appeals in St. Louis, Missouri, to the State Supreme Court, the ruling held that "if an officer of the United States Army takes a slave to a territory where slavery is prohibited, he forfeits his property." Military officers had tried to argue that they could not control their assignments and should not have to forfeit their "property" in slaves if sent to a free jurisdiction. At one time, the US Army paid officers a stipend for servants. No substantive freedom suits based on prior travel or residency in free territories reached the Missouri Supreme Court from 1837 to 1852, making it appear that the issue was settled in favor of freedom for slaves thus affected.
- 1835 Marie Louise v. Marot. This suit was heard by the Louisiana state district court and appealed to the Louisiana Supreme Court. The Court held that a slave who is taken to a territory prohibitive of slavery cannot be again reduced to slavery on returning to a territory allowing slavery. Presiding Judge George Mathews Jr. stated that "[b]eing free for one moment ... it was not in the power of her former owner to reduce her again to slavery." This precedent was overturned by the U.S. Supreme Court in the 1856 landmark Dred Scott v. Sandford case.
- 1836, Commonwealth v. Aves. When New Orleans resident Mary Slater visited her father Thoma Aves in Boston, Massachusetts, she brought her slave girl Med to serve her. In Boston, Slater fell ill and asked her father to care for Med. The Boston Female Anti-Slavery Society and others sought a writ of habeas corpus against Aves, contending that Med became free by Slater's having brought her voluntarily into the free state. The Supreme Judicial Court of Massachusetts ruled that Med was free, and made her a ward of the court. The Massachusetts decision was considered notable for ruling that a slave, brought voluntarily by a master into this free state, became free from the first moment of arrival; no extended residency was required. The decision angered Southerners.
- 1841, United States v. The Amistad. A group of captive Mende being illegally transported as slaves on a ship near Cuba (then a Spanish territory) mutinied against the crew and demanded to return to West Africa. The surviving crew members tricked the captive Africans by steering the ship toward Long Island, New York, where it was intercepted by the US Coast Guard. The United States District Court heard the case in Connecticut, where the ship was taken and the Mende held. The case was international in scope, as the Spanish government supported the ship owners in their attempt to retain the people as slaves. On appeal, the United States Supreme Court ruled that the Mende were taken illegally from Africa in violation of a treaty the Spanish had signed, and that they had legally defended their freedom in the mutiny. The Court ordered that the Africans be immediately freed. A collection was made among private citizens to raise funds to return the people to West Africa.
- 1844, Polly Wash v. David D. Mitchell. Polly Berry (filing as Polly Wash) was the mother of Lucy Ann Berry, and sued David D. Mitchell for her daughter's freedom in 1842. By 1844 in the case Polly Wash v. Joseph A. Magehan, Wash had secured her own freedom, based on having been held illegally as a slave in the free state of Illinois. When her daughter's case was heard later that year, the jury voted in favor of Wash (and Berry), freeing the girl, who had been born when her mother was later established to have been legally free. Nearly 50 years later, Lucy Delaney (by then married) published her memoir. It is the only first-person account of a freedom suit.
- 1852, Scott v. Emerson. The legal scholar Edlie Wong has noted that the case was shaped by Harriet and Dred Scott's desire to achieve freedom and to protect their two young daughters Eliza and Lizzie, who were of an age to be sold and at great risk in slave markets by the time the case was settled. By the 1850s, southern juries became less willing to follow precedent and grant freedom to slaves based on their having resided for a time in free states. In 1852 the Missouri state supreme court ruled that Scott's residence in a free state did not entitle him to freedom after he returned to Missouri. It ruled that he should have sued for freedom while in a free state. This was a de facto end in Missouri to the precedent of "once free, always free."
- 1853, Solomon Northup v. Edwin Epps. Solomon Northup, a free citizen of Saratoga Springs, New York, had been abducted in Washington, D.C., and sold as a slave in Louisiana in 1841. In 1852 he convinced a white man to write a letter informing his friends in New York of his whereabouts. In January 1853 an agent of the state of New York brought evidence of Northup's free status to Avoyelles Parish, Louisiana, and retained a local lawyer to represent Northup. A local judge quickly ruled that Northup was free. Northup returned to his family in upstate New York.
- 1857, Dred Scott v. Sandford. This case was first filed separately in St. Louis, Missouri, by Dred Scott and his wife, each seeking freedom. Scott's wife sought freedom separately in an effort to protect their two daughters, as the maternal line was considered decisive. The cases were combined and later listed only under Scott's name. The US Supreme Court ruling was severe, finding that African-descended persons and slaves had no legal status in federal courts as citizens, and that Congress had no constitutional right to prohibit slavery in any state or territory. While the case has been often discussed in terms of Dred Scott's individual rights, the couple were seeking freedom for both of them and especially to protect their two daughters. The scholar Edlie Wong has assessed the case as a "history of litigation profoundly shaped by gender and kinship."

== Freedom suits in Great Britain ==
- 1772, Somerset v Stewart, a freedom suit ruled on by Lord Mansfield in England, who found that slavery had no basis in common law, and no "positive law" had been passed to establish it. His ruling was narrow, saying only that the master could not remove Somerset against his will from England, in order to send him to Jamaica for sale. But, it was widely considered to end slavery in England.
- 1778, Knight v. Wedderburn, a freedom suit by Joseph Knight, a slave in Scotland. As in Somerset, the court found that slavery had no basis in Scottish common law and effectively ended the institution.

== See also ==
- List of court cases in the United States involving slavery
- Jenny Slew
- Coartación (slavery)
