= History of sexual slavery in the United States =

The history of sexual slavery in the United States is the history of slavery for the purpose of sexual exploitation as it existed in the United States.

== Early Americas ==
It is contended by some that as early as the 1490s Christopher Columbus had established trade in sex slaves on Hispaniola, which included sex slaves as young as 9. Within 25 years of being colonized, the Native population of Hispaniola had drastically declined, due to the effects of enslavement, massacre, and infectious disease.

However, others consider this contention to have arisen from a misreading of primary documents. Columbus does mention the selling of slaves, but as atrocities of a rebelling faction. He continues with this comment, "I declare solemnly that a great number of men have been to the Indies, who did not deserve baptism in the eyes of God or men, and who are now returning thither.”

== Under chattel slavery ==
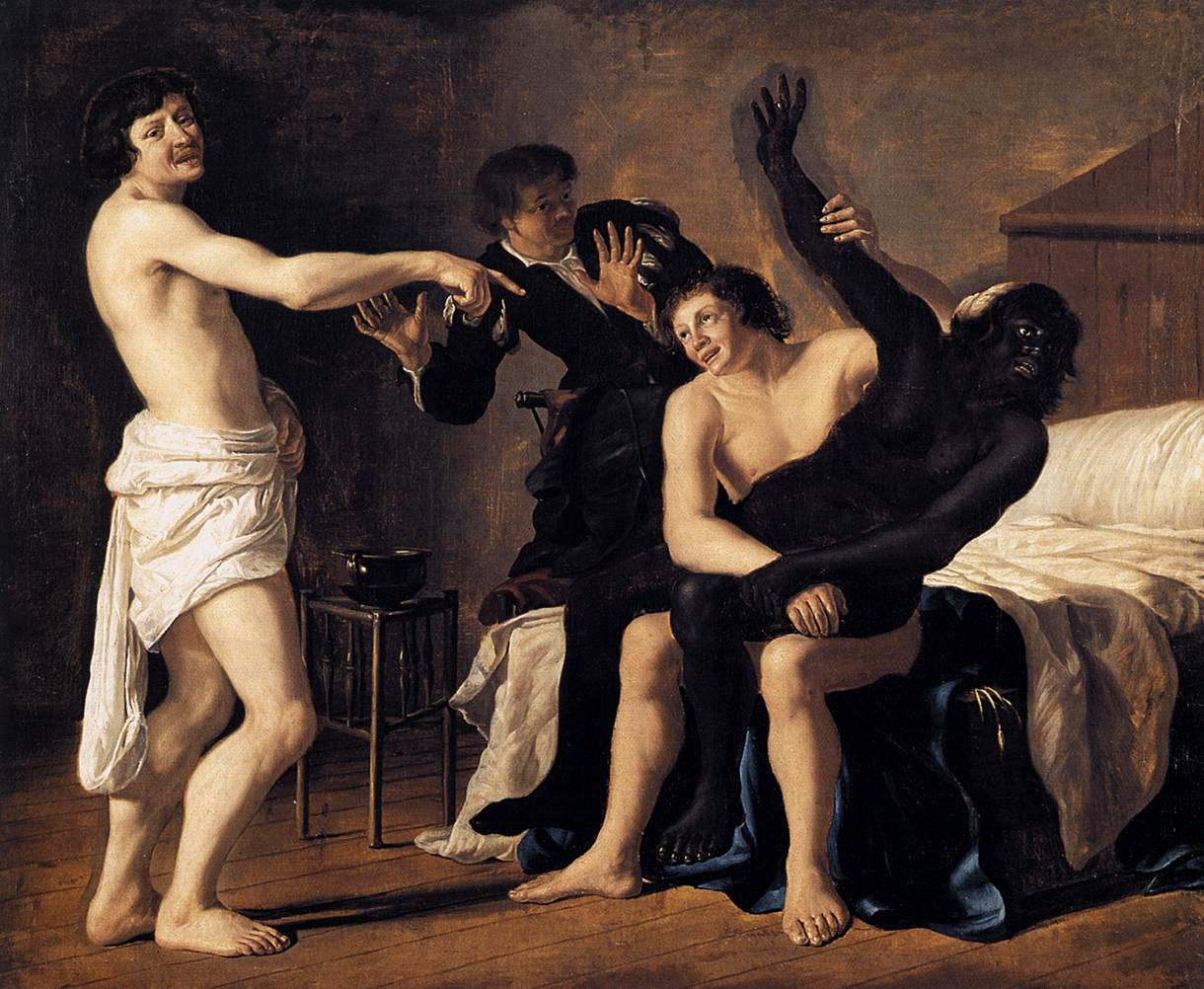
Three Young White Men and a Black Woman (1632) by Christiaen van Couwenbergh

Because of the power relationships at work, slave women in the United States were at high risk for rape and sexual abuse. Their children were repeatedly taken away from them and sold as farm animals; usually they never saw each other again. Many slaves fought back against sexual attacks, and some died resisting. Others carried psychological and physical scars from the attacks. Sexual abuse of slaves was partially rooted in a patriarchal Southern culture that treated black women as property or chattel. Southern culture strongly policed against sexual relations between white women and black men on the purported grounds of racial purity but, by the late 18th century, the many mixed-race slaves and slave children showed that white men had often taken advantage of slave women.

Wealthy planter widowers, notably such as John Wayles and his son-in-law Thomas Jefferson, took slave women as concubines; each had six children with his partner: Elizabeth Hemings and her daughter Sally Hemings (the half-sister of Jefferson's late wife), respectively. Both Mary Chesnut and Fanny Kemble, wives of planters, wrote about this issue in the antebellum South in the decades before the Civil War. Sometimes planters used mixed-race slaves as house servants or favored artisans because they were their children or other relatives. As a result of centuries of slavery and such relationships, DNA studies have shown that the vast majority of African Americans also have historic European ancestry, generally through paternal lines. Concubine slaves were the only female slaves who commanded a higher price than skilled male slaves.

The breeding of enslaved people was the attempt by a slave-owner to increase the reproduction of his victims for profit. It included forced sexual relations between male and female enslaved people, encouraging slave pregnancies, sexual relations between master and slave to produce enslaved children, and favoring enslaved females who had many children. The prohibition on the importation of slaves into the United States after 1808 limited the supply of enslaved people in the United States. This came at a time when the invention of the cotton gin enabled the expansion of cultivation in the uplands of short-staple cotton, leading to clearing lands cultivating cotton through large areas of the Deep South, especially the Black Belt. The demand for labor in the area increased sharply and led to an expansion of the internal slave market. At the same time, the Upper South had an excess number of slaves because of a shift to mixed-crops agriculture, which was less labor-intensive than tobacco. To add to the supply of enslaved people, slaveholders looked at the fertility of slave women as part of their productivity, and intermittently forced the women to have large numbers of children.

During this time period, the terms "breeders", "breeding slaves", "child bearing women", "breeding period", and "too old to breed" became familiar. The historian E. Franklin Frazier, in his book The Negro Family, stated that "there were masters who, without any regard for the preferences of their slaves, mated their human chattel as they did their stock." Ex-slave Maggie Stenhouse remarked, "Durin' slavery there were stockmen. They was weighed and tested. A man would rent the stockman and put him in a room with some young women he wanted to raise children from." As it became popular on many plantations to breed slaves for strength, fertility, or extra labor, there grew many documented instances of "breeding farms" in the United States. Slaves were forced to conceive and birth as many new slaves as possible. The largest farms were located in Virginia and Maryland. Because the industry of slave breeding came from a desire for larger than natural population growth of slaves, slaveowners often turned towards systematic practices for creating more slaves. Female slaves "were subjected to repeated rape or forced sex and became pregnant again and again", even by incest. In horrific accounts of former slaves, some stated that hoods or bags were placed over their heads to prevent them from knowing who they were forced to have sex with. Journalist William Spivey wrote, "It could be someone they know, perhaps a niece, aunt, sister, or their own mother. The breeders only wanted a child that could be sold."

== In Louisiana ==
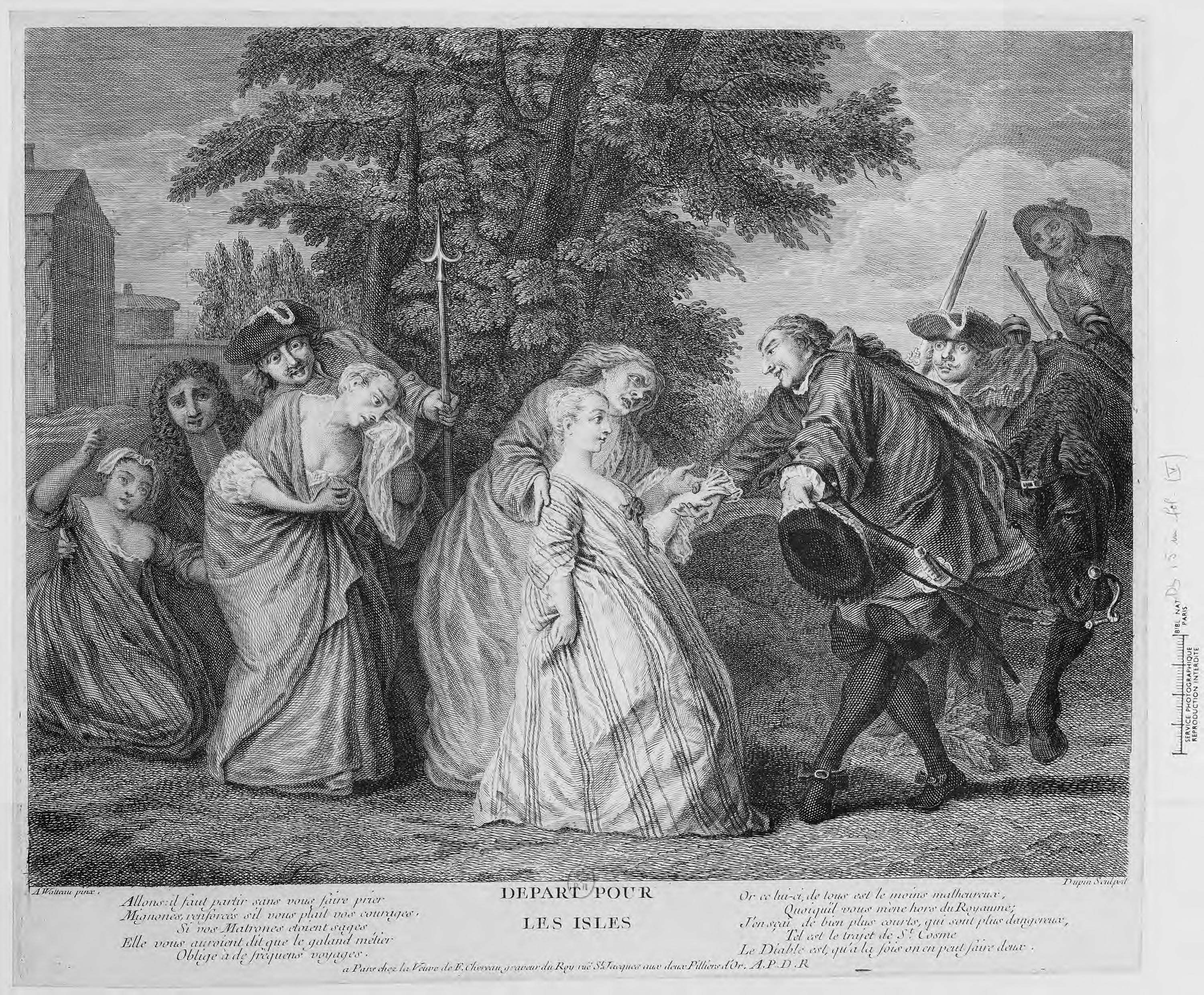
A print depicting ' King's Daughters' embarking unwillingly for the Americas

From the beginning of African slavery in the North American colonies, slaves were often viewed as property, rather than people. Plaçage, a formalized system of concubinage among slave women or free people of color, developed in Louisiana and particularly New Orleans by the 18th century. The plaçage system developed from the predominance of white men among early colonial populations, who took women as consorts from Native Americans and enslaved Africans. In this period there was a shortage of European women, as the colonies were dominated in the early day by male explorers and colonists. Given the harsh conditions in Louisiana, persuading women to follow the men was not easy. France sent females convicted along with their debtor husbands, and in 1719, deported 209 women felons "who were of a character to be sent to the French settlement in Louisiana." France also relocated young women and girls known as King's Daughters (French: filles du roi) to the colonies of Canada and Louisiana for marriage.

Through warfare and raids, Native American women were often captured to be traded, sold, or taken as wives. At first, the colony generally imported male Africans to use as slave labor because of the heavy work of clearing to develop plantations. Over time, it also imported African female slaves. Marriage between the races was forbidden according to the Code Noir of the eighteenth century, but interracial sex continued. The upper class European men during this period often did not marry until their late twenties or early thirties. Premarital sex with an intended white bride, especially if she was of high rank, was not permitted socially.

White male colonists, often the younger sons of noblemen, military men, and planters, who needed to accumulate some wealth before they could marry, took women of color as consorts before marriage. Merchants and administrators also followed this practice if they were wealthy enough.

== Post-emancipation ==
After the enslaved people were emancipated, many states passed anti-miscegenation laws, which prohibited interracial marriage between whites and non-whites. But this did not stop some white men from taking sexual advantage of black women by using their social positions under the Jim Crow system and white supremacy, or in other parts of the country by ordinary power and wealth dynamics.

The Chinese Tanka females were sold from Guangzhou to work as prostitutes for the overseas Chinese male community in the United States. During the California Gold Rush in the late 1840s, Chinese merchants transported thousands of young Chinese girls, including babies, from China to the United States and sold them into sexual slavery within the red light district of San Francisco. Girls could be bought for as cheap as $40 (about $1104 in 2013 dollars) in Guangzhou, and sold for $400 (about $11,040 in 2013 dollars) in the United States. Many of these girls were forced into opium addiction and lived their entire lives as prostitutes. Anglo-American doctors claimed that opium smoking led to increased involvement in prostitution by young white women and to genetic contamination via miscegenation by Chinese men. Anti-Chinese advocates believed America faced a dual dilemma: opium smoking was ruining moral standards and Chinese labor was lowering wages and taking jobs away from European-Americans. Slum residents often frequented the brothels and opium dens of Chinatown in the late 1880s and early 1890s. However, by the mid-1890s, slum inhabitants rarely participated in Chinese brothels or opium smoking, but instead were shown fake opium joints where Chinese actors and their white wives staged illicit scenes for the benefit of their audiences.

The Page Act of 1875 restricted the immigration of Chinese women in reaction to racially charged fears about prostitution, sexually transmitted diseases, and American cultural morality. The Donaldina Cameron House was founded by San Francisco women in 1876 to help Chinese women forced into sexual slavery. Anti-slavery laws were often poorly enforced against local organized gangs. Notable exceptions became known as the "Broken Blossom trials" in the 1930s, facilitated by the escape of Jeung Gwai Ying and the testimony of Wong So.

A few captives from Native American tribes who were used as slaves were not freed, when African-American slaves were emancipated. "Ute Woman", a Ute captured by the Arapaho and later sold to a Cheyenne, was one example. Used as a prostitute for sale to American soldiers at Cantonment in the Indian Territory, she lived in slavery until about 1880 when she died of a hemorrhage resulting from "excessive sexual intercourse".

== White slavery panic ==
Ad warning about white slavery

By the 19th century, most of America's cities had a designated, legally protected area of prostitution. Increased urbanization and young women entering the workforce led to greater flexibility in courtship without supervision. It is in this changing social sphere that a panic over "white slavery" began. This term referred to women being coerced, lured, or kidnapped for the purposes of prostitution. Many journalists and activists in the late nineteenth and early twentieth centuries imagined that coerced sex workers were mostly white women and that most traffickers were male immigrants and men of color; in reality, the identities of sex workers and sex traffickers were not as racially predetermined or gender-specific as made out to be. Historians debate the extent to which "white slavery" was a real phenomenon of widespread coerced sexual labor or a moral panic circulated by journalists and activists but generally agree that there was at least some exaggeration.

Numerous communities appointed vice commissions to investigate the extent of local prostitution, whether prostitutes participated in it willingly or were forced into it and the degree to which it was organized by any cartel-type organizations. The second significant action at the local levels was to close the brothels and the red light districts. From 1910 to 1913, city after city withdrew this tolerance and forced the closing of their brothels. Opposition to openly practiced prostitution had been growing steadily throughout the last decades of the 19th century. The federal government's response to the moral panic was the Mann Act. The purpose of the act was to make it a crime to coerce transportation of unwilling women. The statute made it a crime to "transport or cause to be transported, or aid to assist in obtaining transportation for" or to "persuade, induce, entice or coerce" a woman to travel.

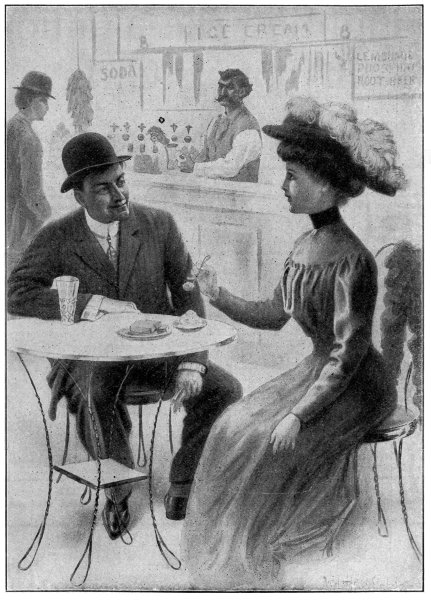
Ad warning about the use of ice cream parlors to traffic women

According to historian Mark Thomas Connelly, "a group of books and pamphlets appeared announcing a startling claim: a pervasive and depraved conspiracy was at large in the land, brutally trapping and seducing American girls into lives of enforced prostitution, or 'white slavery.' These white slave narratives, or white-slave tracts, began to circulate around 1909." Such narratives often portrayed innocent girls "victimized by a huge, secret and powerful conspiracy controlled by foreigners", as they were drugged or imprisoned and forced into prostitution.

This excerpt from The War on the White Slave Trade was written by the United States District Attorney in Chicago:

One thing should be made very clear to the girl who comes up to the city, and that is that the ordinary ice cream parlor is very likely to be a spider's web for her entanglement. This is perhaps especially true of those ice cream saloons and fruit stores kept by foreigners. Scores of cases are on record where young girls have taken their first step towards "white slavery" in places of this character.

Suffrage activists, especially Harriet Burton Laidlaw and Rose Livingston, worked in New York City's Chinatown and in other cities to rescue young white and Chinese girls from forced prostitution, and helped pass the Mann Act to make interstate sex trafficking a federal crime. Livingston publicly discussed her past as a prostitute and claimed to have been abducted and developed a drug problem as a sex slave in a Chinese man's home, narrowly escaped and experienced a Christian conversion narrative. Other groups like the Woman's Christian Temperance Union and Hull House focused on children of prostitutes and poverty in community life while trying to pass protective legislation. The American Purity Alliance also supported the Mann Act. In New York City, the Travelers Aid Society of New York provided social services to women at train stations and piers in order to prevent trafficking.

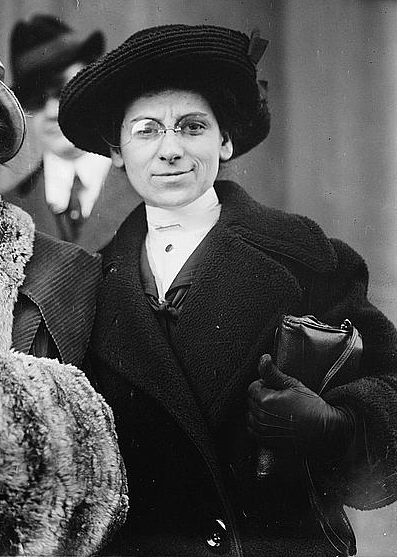
Rose Livingston, known as the Angel of Chinatown, worked to free slaves in New York City.

In 1910, the US Congress passed the White Slave Traffic Act of 1910 (better known as the Mann Act), which made it a felony to transport women across state borders for the purpose of "prostitution or debauchery, or for any other immoral purpose". Its primary stated intent was to address prostitution, immorality, and human trafficking particularly where it was trafficking for the purposes of prostitution, but the ambiguity of "immoral purpose" effectively criminalized interracial marriage and banned single women from crossing state borders for acts considered morally wrong (like extramarital sex). As more women were being trafficked from foreign countries, the US began passing immigration acts to curtail aliens from entering the country. Several acts such as the Emergency Quota Act of 1921 and Immigration Act of 1924 were passed to prevent immigrants from Europe and Asia from entering the United States. Following the banning of immigrants during the 1920s, human trafficking was not considered a major issue until the 1990s.

The 1921 Convention set new goals for international efforts to stem human trafficking, primarily by giving the anti-trafficking movement further official recognition, as well as a bureaucratic apparatus to research and fight the problem. The Advisory Committee on the Traffic of Women and Children was a permanent advisory committee of the League. Its members were nine countries, and several non-governmental organizations. An important development was the implementation of a system of annual reports of member countries. Member countries formed their own centralized offices to track and report on trafficking of women and children. The advisory committee also worked to expand its research and intervention program beyond the United States and Europe. In 1929, a need to expand into the Near East (Asia Minor), the Middle East and Asia was acknowledged. An international conference of central authorities in Asia was planned for 1937, but no further action was taken during the late 1930s.

== Sex trafficking ==
Act 18 U.S.C. § 1591, or the Commercial Sex Act, the US makes it illegal to recruit, entice, obtain, provide, move or harbor a person or to benefit from such activities knowing that the person will be caused to engage in commercial sex acts where the person is under 18 or where force, fraud or coercion exists.

Under the Bush Administration, fighting sex slavery worldwide and domestically became a priority with an average of $100 million spent per year, which substantially outnumbers the amount spent by other countries. Before President Bush took office, Congress passed the Victims of Trafficking and Violence Protection Act of 2000 (TVPA). The TVPA strengthened services to victims of violence, law enforcements ability to reduce violence against women and children, and education against human trafficking. Also specified in the TVPA was a mandate to collect funds for the treatment of sex trafficking victims that provided them with shelter, food, education, and financial grants. Internationally, the TVPA set standards that governments of other countries must follow in order to receive aid from the U.S. to fight human trafficking. Once George W. Bush took office in 2001, restricting sex trafficking became one of his primary humanitarian efforts. The Attorney General under President Bush, John Ashcroft, strongly enforced the TVPA. The Act was subsequently renewed in 2004, 2006, and 2008. It established two stipulations an applicant has to meet in order to receive the benefits of a T-Visa. First, a trafficked victim must prove/admit to being trafficked and second must submit to prosecution of his or her trafficker. In 2011, Congress failed to re-authorize the Act. The State Department publishes an annual Trafficking in Persons Report, which examines the progress that the U.S. and other countries have made in destroying human trafficking businesses, arresting the kingpins, and rescuing the victims.

== See also ==
- Enslaved women's resistance in the United States and Caribbean
- Marriage of enslaved people (United States)
- Children of the plantation

== Sources ==
- Howard, Clayton (2021). "Discovering Vice to Define Virtue: Histories of Sex Work in the Late Nineteenth- and Early Twentieth-century United States". Journal of Urban History. 47 (5): 1168–1174. doi:10.1177/0096144220951761.
- Pliley, Jessica R. (2014). Policing Sexuality: The Mann Act and the Making of the FBI. Harvard University Press. ISBN 978-0674368118.
