= African-American women work songs =

A work song is a song that is sung while doing labour or any kind of work. Usually, the song helps with keeping rhythm or is used as a distraction. Work songs can include content focused around the surrounding environment, resistance, or protest. Many different groups throughout history have sung work songs. Enslaved African-American women had a unique history associated with work songs. Their work songs portrayed their specific standpoint and experiences during the slavery period in the United States.

Work songs were often derived from traditional African songs. Many work songs were in the format of a call and response, which fostered dialogue. The importance of dialogue is illuminated in many African-American traditions and continues to the present day. Particular to the African call and response tradition is the overlapping of the call and response. The leader's part might overlap with the response, thus creating a unique collaborative sound.

Similarly, African-American folk and traditional music focuses on polyphony, rather than a melody with a harmony. Oftentimes, there will be multiple rhythmic patterns used in the same song "resulting in a counterpoint of rhythms." The focus on polyphony also allows for improvisation, a component that is crucial to African-American work songs. As scholar Tilford Brooks writes, "improvisation is utilized extensively in Black folk songs, and it is an essential element especially in songs that employ the call-and-response pattern." Brooks also notes that oftentimes in a work song, "the leader has license to improvise on the melody in [their] call, while the response usually repeats its basic melody line without change."

== Uses ==
The African-American work song tradition has several examples. The study of these provides a unique look into particular resistance tactics used by enslaved people. The work song traditions of enslaved or incarcerated African-American men have been widely studied, and African-American enslaved women similarly incorporated song into their work and resistance narratives. Work songs were considered both an expression of release and the creation of a shared narrative.

Many of the women's songs discuss their past and present suffering under slavery and prospects for freedom. Enslaved women sang songs to their children about slavery, and work songs and lullabies sung by enslaved women commented on the gendered dynamic of slavery.

One song speaks of a family being torn apart by sales:

"Mammy, is Ol'Massa gwin'er sell us tomorrow?

Yes, my chile.

Whar he gwin'er sell us?

Way down South in Georgia."

Often, the songs are complex and express the lived experience of enslaved women. Scholar Lauri Ramsey classifies songs sung by enslaved peoples in the lyric poetry tradition. She says that lyric poetry can be described as "conveying the voices of particular individuals, speaking in their own dictions (or dramatizing those of characters), addressing their own communities, and selecting from a wide range of 'acceptable' forms or prosodic features employed either conventionally or innovatively."

Songs sung by enslaved individuals helped in preserving important cultural traditions. Often enslaved peoples were combined with groups from other cultures and forced to give up their specific traditions and heritage. Singing songs helped to maintain an important oral tradition. Enslaved women were taught to think of themselves and their culture as inferior, but enslaved mothers found that singing songs and lullabies to their children was an important resistance tactic, as they could pass on traditions in a somewhat discreet way.

Many owners of plantations thought that because their workers sang in the fields, it meant that the slaves were happy doing their work. But enslaved men and women were often singing songs about loss, sorrow or struggle. Thus, the practice of singing work songs was radical because slave owners could not understand the content and therefore did not always ban singing. Singing created a sense of community, a community space untainted by the presence of their masters.

Jacqueline Jones comments on how song helped to create community:

On many plantations, it was the custom to release adult women from fieldwork early on Saturday so that they could do their week's washing. Whether laundering was done in old wooden tubs, iron pots, or a nearby creek with batten sticks, wooden paddles, or washboards, it was a time-consuming and difficult chore. Yet this ancient form of women's work provided opportunities for socializing "whilst de 'omans leaned over de tubs washin' and a-singin' dem old songs." Mary Frances Webb remembered wash day – "a regular picnic" – with some fondness; it was a time for women "to spend the day together," out of the sight and earshot of whites.

Scholar Gale Jackson acknowledges the complexity of black women's work songs and says, "African American women's work and play songs utilize characteristically African modalities of storytelling, improvisational 'bantering,' and historical documentation, pairing song and dance in percussive, multi-metered, polyphonic, call and response performance, to engage in circles of ancestry, articulation of journey, acts of witness, transformative pedagogy, and communal art making." Work songs fostered a collective, collaborative work environment, one that was made as an act of rebellion and resistance by enslaved women during their forced work.

== Examples ==
Bile the Cabbage Down

Raccoon has a bushy tail Possum's tail is bare

Rabbit's got no tail at all but a little bunch of hair.

Chorus

Bile them cabbage down, down

Bake that hoe cake brown brown

The only song that I can sing is

Bile the cabbage down

Rainbow Round My Shoulder

I got a rainbow Huh!

Round my shoulder Huh!

It ain't gonna rain Huh!

It ain't gonna rain Huh!

Come on Mr. Tree

You almost down

Huh!

Come on Mr. Tree

Hit the ground

Huh!

Shoo Fly

Shoo, fly don't bother me

Shoo, fly don't bother

Shoo, fly don't bother me

Cause I belong to somebody.

I feel, I feel, I feel

I feel like a morning star

I feel, I feel, I feel

I feel like a morning star.

Old Cotton Old Corn

Old cotton, old corn, see you every morn

Old cotton, old corn, see you since I was born

Old cotton, old corn, hoe you till dawn

Old cotton, old corn, what for you born?

Keep yo' eye on de sun,

See how she run

Don't let her catch you with you work undone,

I'm a trouble, I'm a trouble,

Trouble don' las' alway

== See also ==
- Call and response
- Enslaved women's resistance in the United States and Caribbean
- Female slavery in the United States
- Field holler
