= Call and response =

Speaker-audience interaction

Call and response is a form of interaction between a speaker and an audience in which the speaker's statements ("calls") are punctuated by responses from the listeners, for example in protest gatherings and marches where calls such as "what do we want?" and "when do we want it?" form a vehicle for promoting the issue underlying the protest. This form is also used in music, where it falls under the general category of antiphony.

== African cultures ==
In some African cultures, call-and-response is a widespread pattern of democratic participation—in public gatherings, in the discussion of civic affairs, in religious rituals, as well as in vocal and instrumental musical expression (see call and response in music). African bondsmen and bondswomen in the Americas continued this practice over the centuries in various forms of expression—in religious observance; public gatherings; even in children's rhymes; and, most notably, in music in its multiple forms: blues, gospel, rhythm and blues, soul, jazz, hip-hop and go-go. Many work songs sung on plantations by enslaved men and women also incorporate the call and response format. Enslaved Africans in America carried this practice into work songs, ring outs where “leaders” created random chants to be answered by the group, creating cohesion between the workers. African-American women work songs incorporate the call and response format, a format that fosters dialogue. In contemporary African-American worship services, where call and response is pervasive, a pastor will call out to his congregants to engage an enthusiastic response. For example "Can I get an Amen?" or "Raise your hands and give Him praise!"

Call and response is derived from the historical African roots that served as the foundation for African American cultural traditions. The call and response format became a diasporic tradition, and it was part of Africans and African Americans creating a new, unique tradition in the United States.

While slave masters encouraged conversion of slaves to Christianity, African slaves still practiced their own form of religious celebration, which was called Slave Christianity. But antiphony, a kind of call and response in Anglican worship, was also part of formal services in the South for centuries. African Americans put that tradition to their own use, as well as picking themes from Christianity that meant the most to them.

== Exploring call and response in Black Girls Game Song ==
Black Girls Game Song is a form of musical expression and cultural tradition that emerged from the African diaspora and continues to evolve in modern society.

Rooted in the experiences of Black girls and women, their game songs encompass a diverse range of practices, including hand clapping, cheers, double-dutch jump rope chants, and other forms of music making. In their playful pursuits, African-American girls demonstrate a fundamental complement of Black music-making: syncopated rhythms and intricate percussion ignite hand-clapping and foot stomping; call-and-response patterns that define the interplay of linguistic and musical doing between their voices and bodies during group play; and a strong emphasis on percussive elements permeates their singing or chanting. Through their playful activities, girls engage in a form of embodied storytelling. This play acts as a practice and performance, akin to mnemonic rituals, that contribute to the ongoing development of African American and Black musical identities.

Researchers have noted that these expressions provide a means for the Black community to address social frustrations and reflect historical experiences of racial injustices.

== See also ==
- Human microphone
- Marco Polo (game)
- Sea shanty
