= Female slavery in the United States =

Living in a wide range of circumstances and possessing the intersecting identity of both black and female, enslaved women of African descent had nuanced experiences of slavery. Historian Deborah Gray White explains that "the uniqueness of the African-American female's situation is that she stands at the crossroads of two of the most well-developed ideologies in America, that regarding women and that regarding the Negro." Beginning as early on in enslavement as the voyage on the Middle Passage, enslaved women received different treatment due to their gender. In regard to physical labor and hardship, enslaved women received similar treatment to their male counterparts, but they also frequently experienced sexual abuse at the hand of their enslavers who used stereotypes of black women's hypersexuality as justification.

== Stereotypes and mythology ==
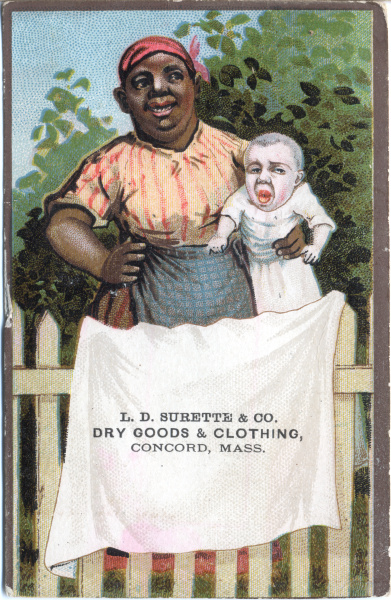
A stereotypical “Mammy”

The justification of enslavers' treatment of enslaved women was often supported by Jezebel and Mammy stereotypes.

Characterizing black women as possessing an unusually high libido, the Jezebel character "first gained credence when Englishmen went to Africa to buy slaves." Both the attire that women wore (which was required by the tropical climate) and African traditions of polygamy were "attributed to the Africans' uncontrollable lust." By posing the Jezebel character as the absolute opposite of Victorian idealizations of womanhood, white enslavers used the stereotype to further other women of African descent and often to invalidate claims of sexual abuse.

The Mammy stereotype primarily "comes from memoirs written after the civil war." Such accounts portray Mammy as an expert in domesticity and the superior house servant. White accounts further characterize the Mammy as possessing a love for her enslavers' white children that would sometimes surpass her love for her own offspring. Like the Jezebel character, the Mammy stereotype is misleading yet grounded in enough reality "to lend credibility to stereotypes that would profoundly affect black women." The Mammy stereotype serves to soften the realities of slavery by painting a picture of house servants living in pleasant domesticity, when in fact "house servants were on call at all hours ... They probably had less privacy than field workers. They were always under the scrutiny of the white family and for more subject to their mood swings, particularly to those of the mistress, than other slaves."

== Experiences of motherhood in slavery ==
Enslaved black mothers had unique experiences in regard to maternal practices. Revered and abused for their procreative capacity, enslaved women were seen as a means of increasing the enslaved population. "Once slaveholders realized that the reproductive function of the female slave could yield a profit, the manipulation of procreative sexual relations became an integral part of the sexual exploitation of female slaves."

Additionally, enslaved mothers were often exploited by way of wet-nursing, a practice wherein the enslaved mother would suckle a white slaver's infant. "Enslaved women shared their breast milk when white slaveholders forced them to labor away from their infants, or when they sold mothers away from their suckling babies, or when nursing slaves died." Reinforcing the Mammy stereotype, the forced practice of wet-nursing often required enslaved mothers to prioritize their enslavers' infants rather than their own, and in fact could sometimes lead to the enslaved mother's infant dying of malnutrition from being weaned off of breast milk too early. Predating the transatlantic slave trade, European travelers viewed African women as having "superior ability to suckle" because of their long breasts that enabled "women to suckle their infants over their shoulders." These representations also led to "erotic images of enslaved wet nurses, in order for slaveholders to rationalize both the sexual exploitation of enslaved women and the care they provided to white offspring."

Because of the demands of enslavement, female slaves tended to rely on "shared and communal forms of mothering." Although likely unrealized by enslaved women, this shared form of mothering carried a continuity between Africa, where women typically relied on other women to raise their children with little help from men, and North America. "In all likelihood this helped preserve the part of African culture that put emphasis on motherhood, and the African mother probably passed it on to her daughters."

== Sexual exploitation of enslaved women ==
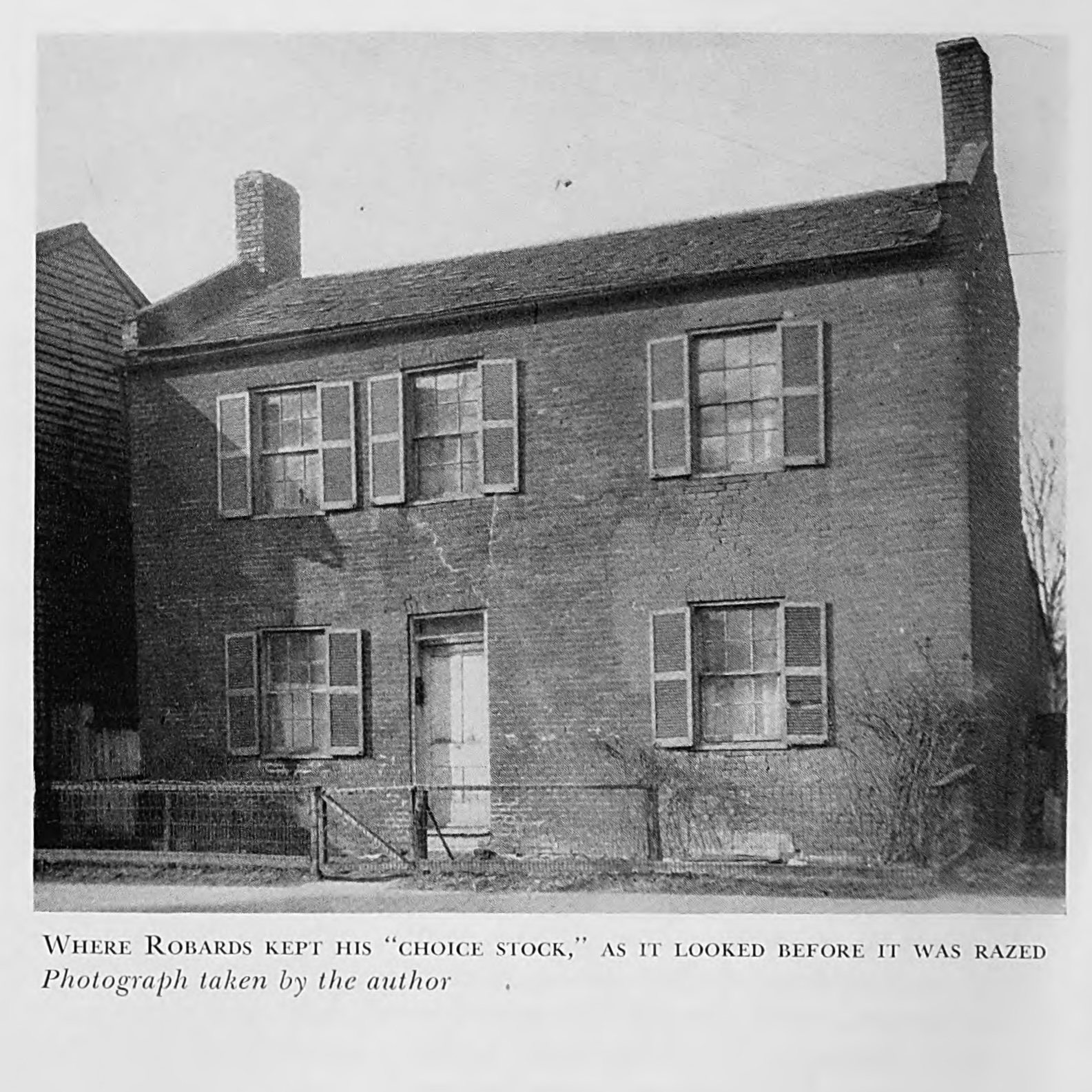
House of rape run by Lewis C. Robards, from Lincoln and the Bluegrass: slavery and civil war in Kentucky by William H. Townsend (1955)

White male enslavers frequently subjected their female slaves to sexual abuse. Using misconceptions of enslaved women as being unusually libidinous by nature, enslavers did not believe that enslaved women could be sexually assaulted. "Black men and women were thought to have such insatiable sexual appetites that they had to go beyond the boundaries of their race to get satisfaction. It was black women who, many claimed, tempted men of the superior caste." Sometimes leading to pregnancies that yielded mixed-race babies, the sexual abuse of enslaved women could prove to be incredibly disruptive: "Half-white children told a story of a white man's infidelity, a slave woman's helplessness (though this concerned few whites), and a white woman's inability to defy the social and legal constraints that kept her bound to her husband regardless of his transgressions." Unable to punish their husbands for their infidelity, the white women in question would often punish the enslaved woman: "To punish Black women ... mistresses were likely to attack with any weapon available – a fork, butcher knife, knitting needle, pan of boiling water. Some of the most barbaric forms of punishment resulting in the mutilation and permanent scarring of female servants were devised by white mistresses in the heat of passion."

A constant source of anxiety, sexual abuse was a possibility both from black and white men on plantations. Mothers often "schooled their daughters on avoiding the sexual overtures of these men." Unfortunately, "a mother could do little but hope that her daughter made it through adolescence and young womanhood unscathed by sexual abuse."

== Colonial America ==
=== Virginia ===
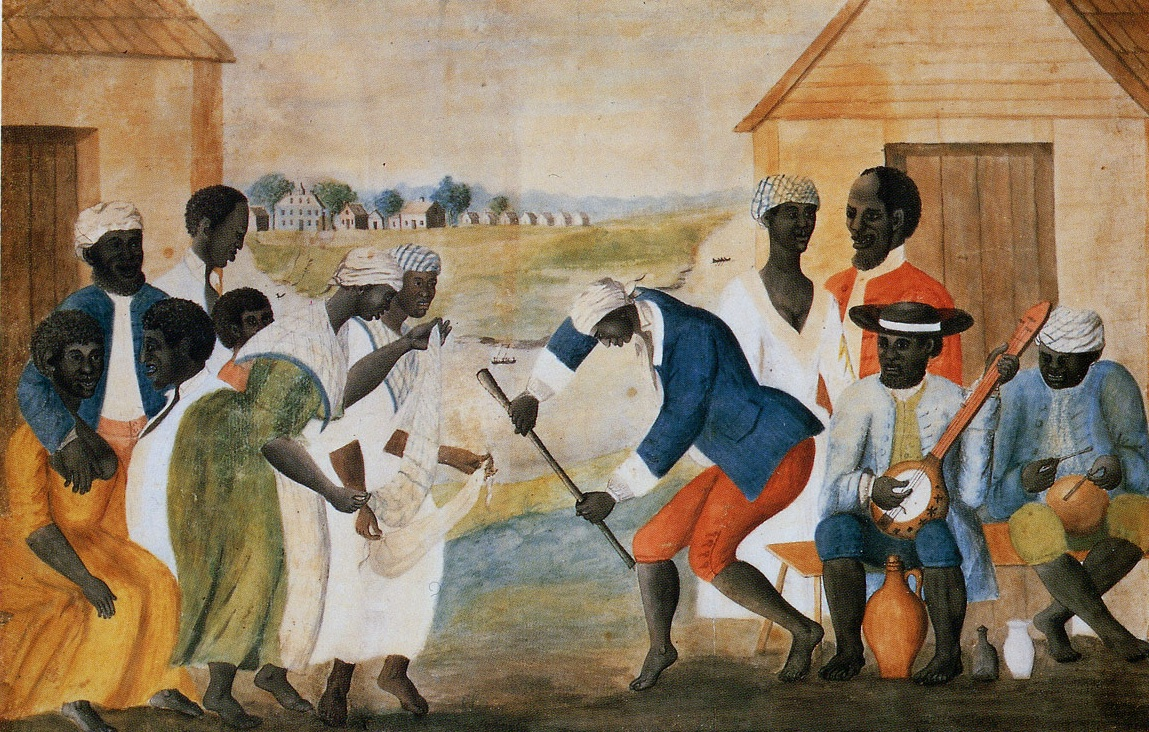
The Old Plantation, c. 1790. Enslaved Africans on a South Carolinian plantation.

From 1700 to 1740, an estimated 43,000 slaves were imported into Virginia, and almost all but 4,000 were imported directly from Africa. Recent scholarship suggests that the number of women and men imported in this period was more or less equal and included a high number of children. As most were from West Africa, its cultures were central in the mid to late eighteenth-century slave life in Virginia. African values were prevalent and West African women's cultures had strong representations. Some prevalent cultural representations were the deep and powerful bonds between mother and child, and among women within the larger female community. Among the Igbo ethnic group in particular (from present-day Nigeria), which comprised between one-third and one-half of incoming slaves in the early eighteenth century, female authority (the omu) "ruled on a wide variety of issues of importance to women in particular and the community as a whole." The Igbo represented one group of people brought to the Chesapeake, but in general, Africans came from an extremely diverse range of cultural backgrounds. All came from worlds where women's communities were strong, and were introduced into a patriarchal and violently racist and exploitative society; white men typically characterized all black women as passionately sexual, to justify their sexual abuse and miscegenation.

Girls of African descent in Virginia were often uneducated and illiterate. African and African American female slaves occupied a broad range of positions. The southern colonies were majorly agrarian societies and enslaved women provided labor in the fields, planting and doing chores, but mostly in the domestic sphere, nursing, taking care of children, cooking, laundering, etc.

=== New England ===
Jersey Negro (1748), John Greenwood. This portrait of Ann Arnold was the first individual portrait of a black woman in North America. Ann Arnold was the wet nurse of a child whose parents were born in the English isle of Jersey. Museum of Fine Arts, Boston.

Historian Ira Berlin distinguished between "slave societies" and "societies with slaves". By this standard, New England was considered to be a society with slaves, dependent on maritime trade and diversified agriculture, in contrast to the slave societies of the south, which were "socially, economically, and politically dependent on slave labor, had a large enslaved population, and allowed masters extensive power over their slaves unchecked by the law." New England had a small slave population and enslavers thought of themselves as patriarchs with the duty to protect, guide, and care for their slaves. Enslaved women in New England had greater opportunity to seek freedom than in other regions because of "the New England legal system, the frequency of manumission by owners, and chances for hiring out, especially among enslaved men, who seized the opportunity to earn enough money to purchase a wife and children."

Enslaved women largely occupied traditional domestic roles and were often hired out by the day. They worked mainly as maids, in the kitchen, the barn, and the garden. They did menial and servile tasks: polished family silver or furniture, helped with clothes and hair, drew baths, barbered the men, and completed domestic chores like sweeping, emptying chamber pots, carrying gallons of water a day, washing the dishes, brewing, looking after young children and the elderly, cooking and baking, milking the cows, feeding the chickens, spinning, knitting, carding, sewing, and laundering. Their daily work was less demanding than the field labor of enslaved women in other regions. Nonetheless, enslaved women in New England worked hard, often while enduring poor living conditions and malnutrition. "As a result of heavy work, poor housing conditions, and inadequate diet, the average black woman did not live past forty."

Enslaved women were given to white women as gifts from their husbands, and as wedding and Christmas gifts. The idea that New England masters treated their slaves with greater kindness in comparison to southern slave owners is a myth. They had little mobility, freedom, and lacked access to education and any training. "The record of slaves who were branded by their owners, had their ears nailed, fled, committed suicide, suffered the dissolution of their families, or were sold secretly to new owners in Barbados in the last days of the Revolutionary War before they become worthless seems sufficient to refute the myth of kindly masters. They lashed out at their slaves when they were angry, filled with rage, or had convenient access to horsewhip." Slaveholders sometimes forced female slaves into sexual relationships with enslaved men for the purpose of forced breeding. It was also not uncommon for slaveholders to rape and impregnate enslaved women.

=== Southern colonies ===
Regardless of location, slaves endured hard and demeaning lives, but labor in the southern colonies was most severe. The southern colonies were slave societies; they were "socially, economically, and politically dependent on slave labor, had a large enslaved population, and allowed masters extensive power over their slaves unchecked by the law." Plantations were the economic power structure of the South, and slave labor was its foundation. Early on, slaves in the South worked primarily in agriculture, on farms and plantations growing indigo, rice, and tobacco; cotton became a major crop after the 1790s. Female slaves worked in a wide variety of capacities. They were expected to do field work as well as have children to increase the slave population. In the years before the American Revolution, the female slave population grew mainly as a result of natural increase and not importation. "Once slaveholders realized that the reproductive function of the female slave could yield a profit, the manipulation of procreative sexual relations became an integral part of the sexual exploitation of female slaves." Many enslaved women raised their children without much assistance from men. Enslaved women not only did house and fieldwork, but also to bore, nourished, and reared their children. As house slaves, women were domestic servants: cooking, sewing, acting as maids, and rearing the planter's children.

== Revolutionary era ==
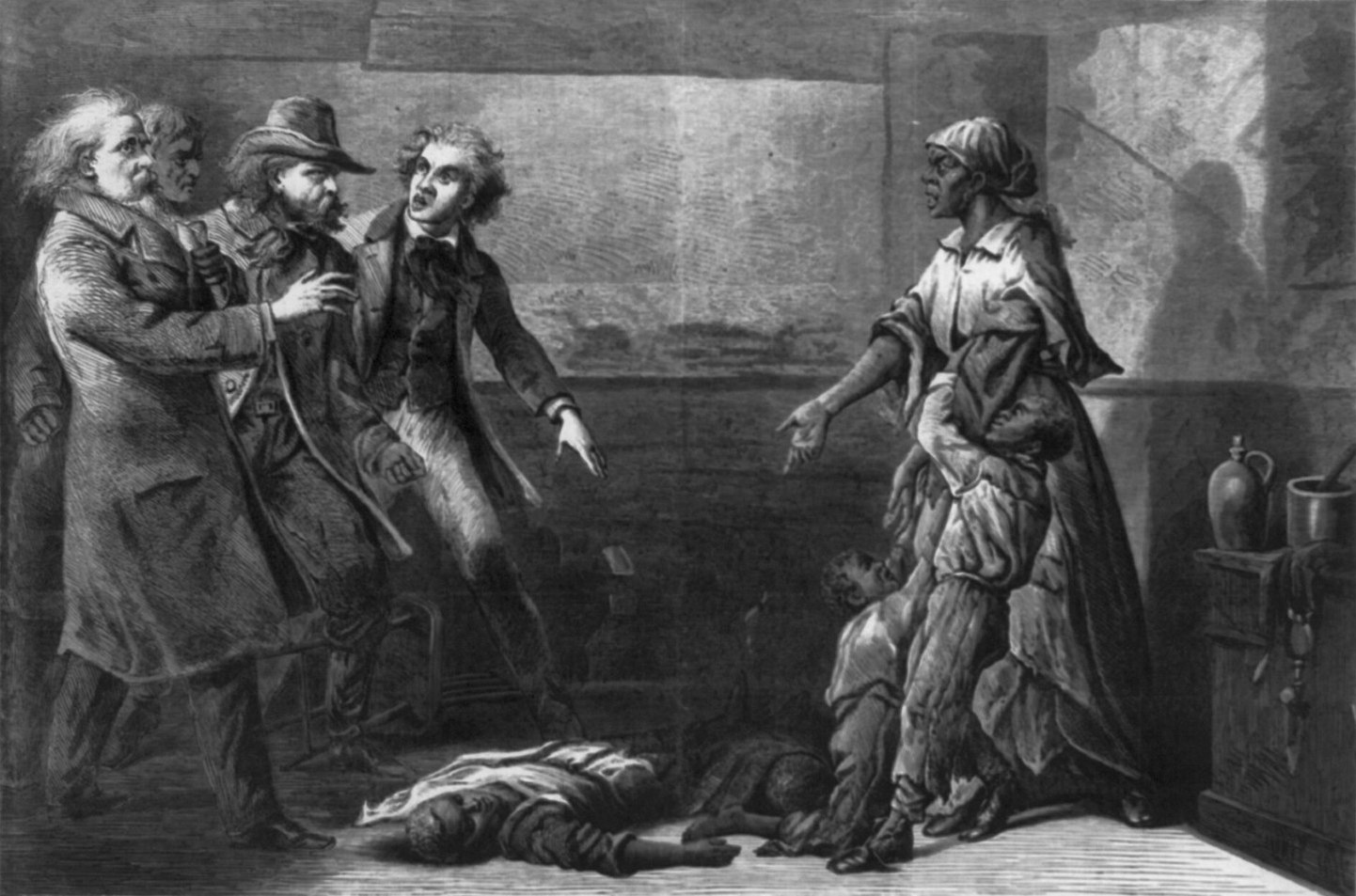
The Modern Medea (1867), an illustration of Margaret Garner, an escaped enslaved African American who in 1856, about to be captured, killed her daughter, Mary, to ensure Mary was not returned to slavery

During the Revolutionary War (1775–1783) enslaved women served on both sides, the Loyalist army as well as the Patriots, as nurses, laundresses, and cooks. But as historian Carol Berkin writes, "African American loyalties were to their own future, not to Congress or to the king." Enslaved women could be found in army camps and as camp followers. They worked building roads, constructing fortifications, and laundering uniforms, "but they remained slaves rather than refugees. Masters usually hired these women out to the military, sometimes hiring out their children as well." Enslaved women could also be found working in the shops, homes, fields, and plantations of every American colony. It is estimated that by 1770, there were more than 47,000 enslaved blacks in the northern colonies, almost 20,000 of them in New York. More than 320,000 slaves worked in the Chesapeake colonies, making 37 percent of the population of the region African or African American. Over 187,000 of these slaves were in Virginia. In the Lower South, there were more than 92,000 slaves. South Carolina alone had over 75,000 slaves, and by 1770 planters there were importing 4,000 Africans a year. In many counties in the Lower South, the slave population outnumbered the white.

During the disruption of war, both men and women ran away. Men were more likely to escape, as pregnant women, mothers, and women who nursed their elderly parents or friends seldom abandoned those who depended on them. So many slaves deserted their plantations in South Carolina that there were not enough field hands to plant or harvest crops. As food grew scarce, those of African descent who remained behind suffered from starvation or enemy attack. The Crown issued certificates of manumission to more than 914 women as a reward for serving with Loyalist forces. However, many women who had won their freedom lost it again "through violence and trickery and the venality of men entrusted with their care." Others who managed to secure their freedom faced racial prejudice, discrimination, and poverty. When loyalist plantations were captured, enslaved women were often taken and sold for the soldiers' profit. The Crown did keep promising manumission slaves, evacuating them along with troops in the closing days of the war, and resettling more than 3,000 Black Loyalists in Nova Scotia, and others in the Caribbean, and England. In 1792, it established Freetown, in what is now Sierra Leone, as a colony for Poor Blacks from London, as well as Black Loyalists from Canada who wanted to relocate.

One of the most well-known voices for freedom around the Revolutionary era was Phillis Wheatley of Massachusetts. She was a slave for most of her life but was given freedom by her master. Educated in Latin, Greek, and English, Wheatley wrote a collection of poems that asserted that Africans, as children of God just like Europeans, deserved respect and freedom.

In 1777, Vermont drafted a state constitution that prohibited the institution of slavery. In 1780, a Massachusetts state judge declared slavery to be unconstitutional according to the state's new bill of rights, which declared "all men ... free and equal." Slavery effectively ended in Massachusetts with this ruling in a freedom suit by Quock Walker. This led to an increase in enslaved men and women suing for their freedom in New England. Also in 1780 in Pennsylvania, the legislature enacted "a gradual emancipation law that directly connected the ideals of the Revolution with the rights of the African Americans to freedom." In the South, the immediate legacy of the Revolution was increased manumission by slaveholders in the first two decades after the war. But, the invention of the cotton gin enabled widespread cultivation of short-staple cotton, and with the opening up of southwestern lands to cotton and sugar production, demand for slaves increased. Legislatures made emancipation difficult to gain, and they passed harsher laws regulating African-American lives.

== Antebellum period ==
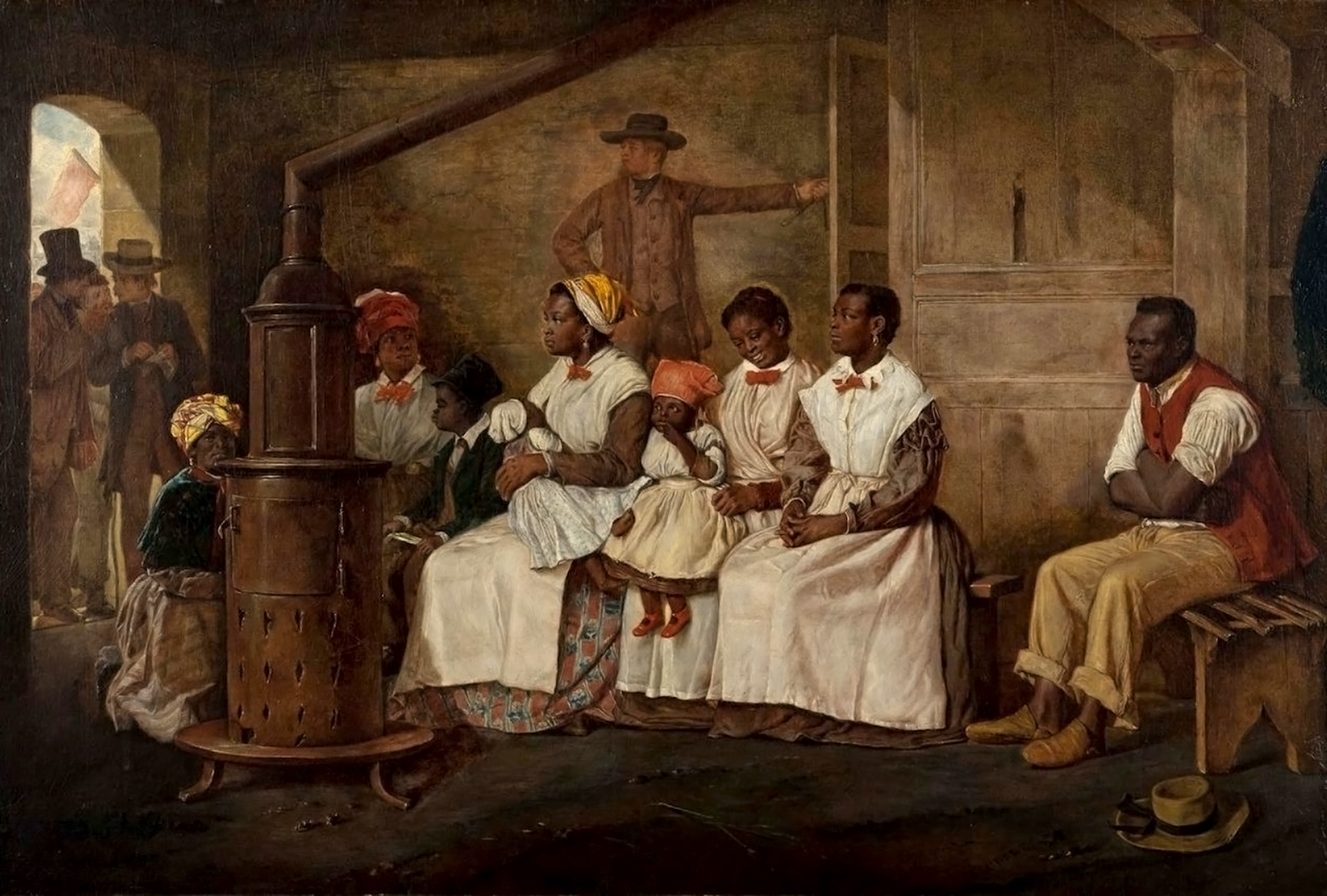
"Slaves Waiting for Sale." Women and children slaves, dressed in new clothes, wait to be sold in Richmond, Virginia, in the 19th century. Based on a sketch of 1853.

As historian Deborah Gray White explains, "Black in a white society, slave in a free society, woman in a society ruled by men, female slaves had the least formal power and were perhaps the most vulnerable group of Americans."

The mother-daughter relationship was often the most enduring and as such cherished within the African American complex of relations. Relatively few women were runaways, and when they did run, they sometimes escaped with their children. Historian Martha Saxton writes about enslaved mothers' experiences in St. Louis in the antebellum period: "In Marion County, north of St. Louis, a slave trader bought three small children from an owner, but the children's mother killed them all and herself rather than let them be taken away. A St. Louis trader took a crying baby from its mother, both on their way to be sold, and made a gift of it to a white woman standing nearby because its noise was bothering him." Another way these generational connections can be seen is through song. Songs about slavery and women's experiences during their enslavement were often passed down through generations. African-American women work songs are historical snapshots of lived experience and survival. Songs speak of families being torn apart and the emotional turmoil that enslaved women were put through by slavery. Songs add the legacy of an oral tradition that fosters generational knowledge about historical periods. Little girls as young as seven were frequently sold away from their mothers:

"Mary Bell was hired out by the year to take care of three children starting when she was seven. John Mullanphy noted that he had lived with him a four-year-old mulatto girl, whom he willed to the Sisters of Charity in the event of his death. George Morton sold his daughter Ellen 'a certain Mulatto girl a slave about fourteen years of age named Sally, being the child of a certain Negro woman named Ann'." In 1854 Georgia was the first and only state to pass a law that put conditions of sales that separated mothers and their children. Children under five could not be sold away from their mothers, "unless such division cannot in any wise be [e]ffected without such separation.'"

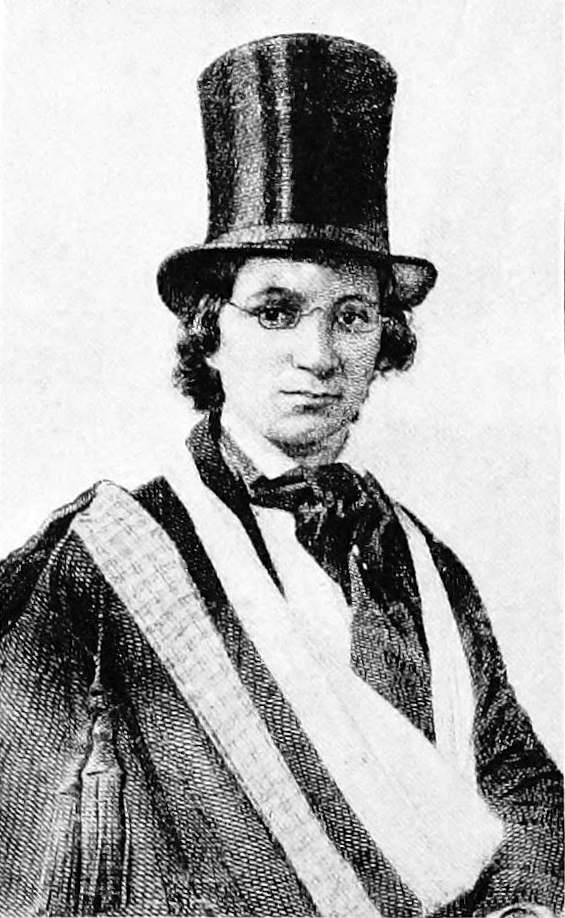
In 1848, Ellen Craft, of mixed race, posed as a white man to escape from slavery.

Slave girls in North America often worked within the domestic sphere, providing household help. White families sought the help of a "girl", an "all-purpose tool" in family life. Although the word "girl" applied to any working female without children, white families preferred slaves because of cost effectiveness. These enslaved girls were usually very young, anywhere from nine years of age to their mid-teens. Heavy household work was assigned to the "girl" and was therefore stigmatized as "negroes'" work. A "girl" was an essential source of help to white families, rural and urban, middle class, and aspiring. She provided freedom for daughters to devote themselves to their self-development and relieved mothers from exhausting labor while requiring no financial or emotional maintenance, "no empathy".

In antebellum America, as in the past (from the initial African-European contact in North America), black women were deemed to be governed by their libidos and portrayed as "Jezebel character[s]...in every way the counterimage of the mid-nineteenth-century ideal of the Victorian lady."

Enslaved women in every state of the antebellum union considered freedom, but it was a livelier hope in the North than in most of the South. Many slaves sought their freedom through self-purchase, the legal system of freedom suits, and as runaways, sometimes resulting in the separation of children and parents. "Unfinished childhoods and brutal separations punctuated the lives of most African American girls, and mothers dreamed of freedom that would not impose more losses on their daughters."

=== Antebellum South ===
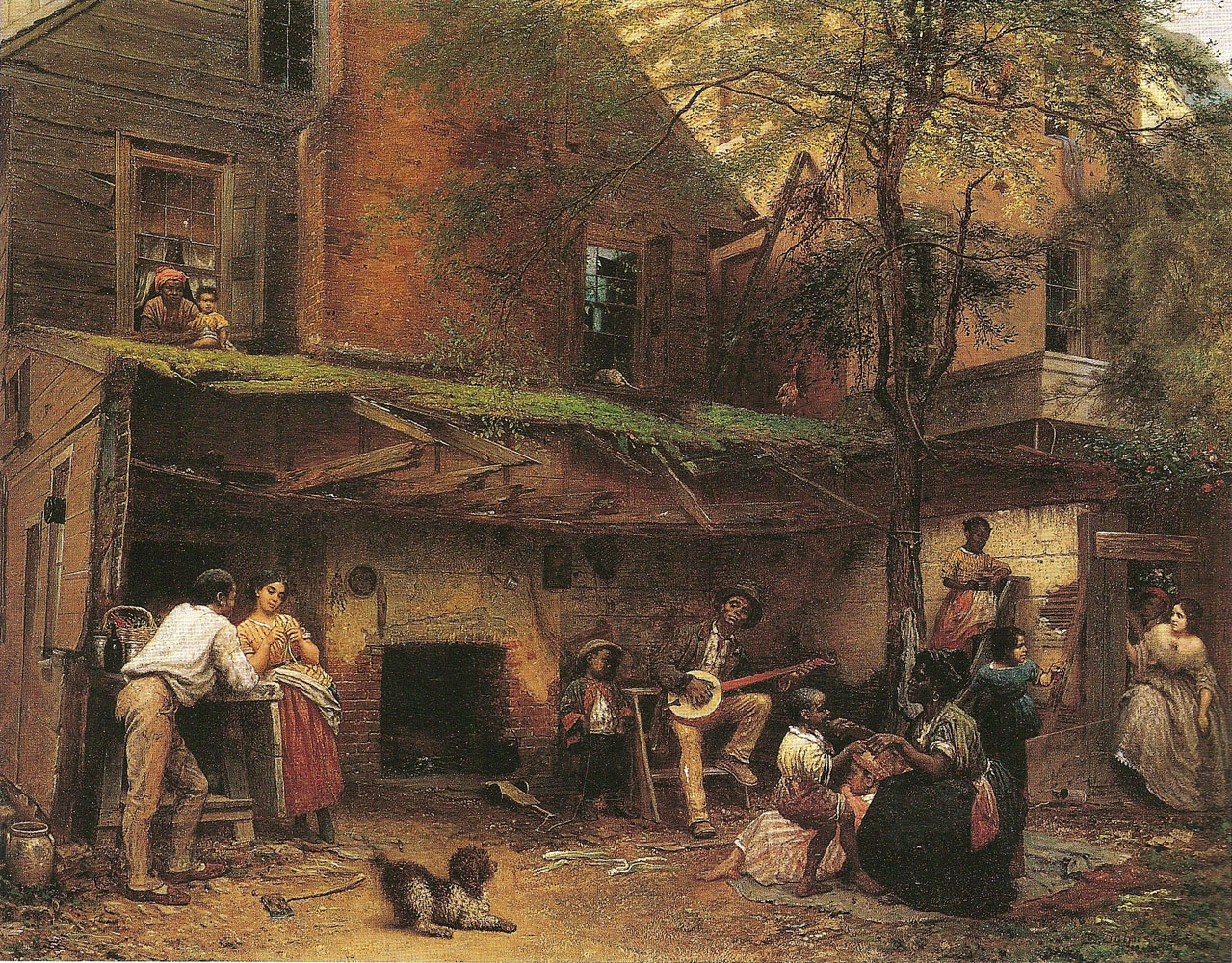
Eastman Johnson's 1859 painting "Negro Life at the South" subtly portrays relationships of white male masters and their female slaves.

After the Revolution, Southern plantation owners imported a massive number of new slaves from Africa and the Caribbean until the United States banned the import of slaves in 1808. More importantly, more than one million slaves were transported in forced migration in the domestic slave trade, from the Upper South to the Deep South, most by slave traders—either overland where they were held for days in chained coffles, or by the coastwise trade and ships. The majority of slaves in the Deep South, men, and women, worked on cotton plantations. Cotton was the leading cash crop during this time, but slaves also worked on rice, corn, sugarcane, and tobacco plantations, clearing new land, digging ditches, cutting and hauling wood, slaughtering livestock, and making repairs to buildings and tools. Black women also cared for their children and managed the bulk of the housework and domestic chores. Living with the dual burdens of racism and sexism, enslaved women in the South held roles within the family and community that contrasted sharply with more traditional or upper-class American women's roles.

Young girls generally started working well before boys, with many working before age seven. Although fieldwork was traditionally considered to be "men's work", different estimates conclude that between 63 and 80 percent of women worked in the fields. Adult female work depended greatly upon plantation size. On small farms, women and men performed similar tasks, while on larger plantations, men were given more physically demanding work. Few of the chores performed by enslaved women took them off the plantation. Therefore, they were less mobile than enslaved men, who often assisted their masters in the transportation of crops, supplies, and other materials, and were often hired out as artisans and craftsmen. Women also worked in the domestic sphere as servants, cooks, seamstresses, and nurses. Although a female slave's labor in the field superseded child-rearing in importance, the responsibilities of childbearing and childcare greatly circumscribed the life of an enslaved woman. This also explains why female slaves were less likely to run away than men.

Many female slaves were the object of severe sexual exploitation; often bearing the children of their white masters, master's sons, or overseers. Slaves were prohibited from defending themselves against any type of abuse, including sexual, at the hands of white men. If a slave attempted to defend herself, she was often subjected to further beatings by the master or even by the mistress. Black women and girls were forced into sexual relationships for their white owners' pleasure and profit: attempting to keep the slave population growing by his own doing, and not by importing more slaves from Africa. Thomas Jefferson, 3rd President of the United States, is believed to have fathered six mixed-race children (four survived to adulthood) with one of his female slaves, Sally Hemings, a woman three-quarters white and half-sister to his late wife, who served as the widower's concubine for more than two decades. In the case of Harriet Jacobs, author of Incidents in the Life of a Slave Girl, her slaver, Dr. James Norcom, had sexually abused her for years. Even after she had two children of her own, he threatened to sell them if she denied his sexual advances. Although Harriet Jacobs managed to escape to the North with her children, the Fugitive Slave Act of 1850 still put their freedom at risk due to Dr. Norcom's family continuing to pursue her.

== Emancipation and the ending of slavery ==
Slavery was abolished in the United States in 1865 due to the ratification of the 13th Amendment. In 1868, the 14th Amendment extended citizenship rights to African Americans.

Although emancipation freed black women from slavery, it also heightened the inequality between black women and black men. No longer servants to slave owners, black women were contractual servants to their husbands due to the patriarchal principles governing the role of women in marriage. Additionally, women of African descent endured discrimination from white women in the time following emancipation, including during the women's suffrage movement; they continue to endure present-day discrimination.

== Notable enslaved women ==
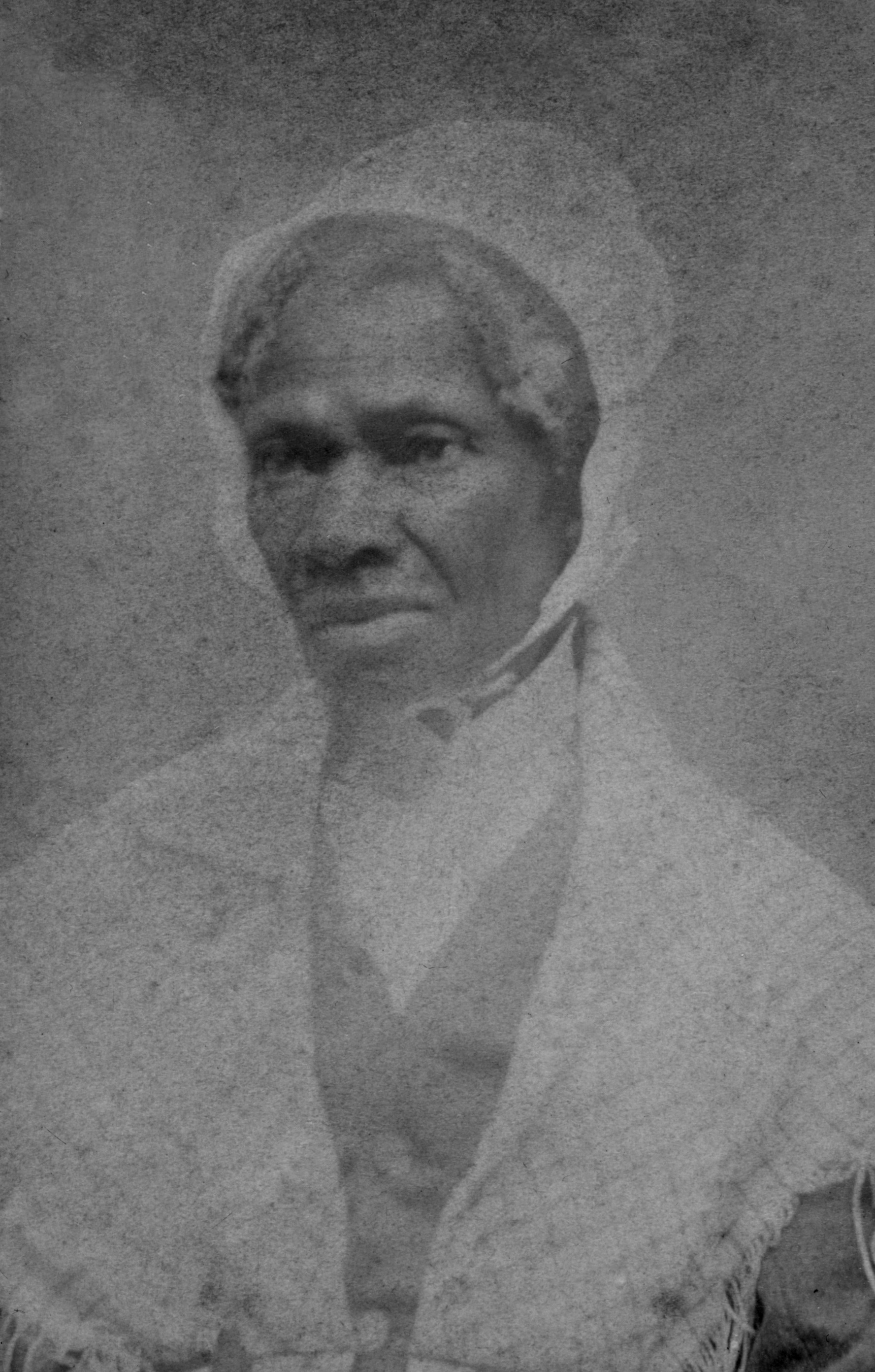
Sojourner Truth circa 1864

- Ellen Craft (1826–1897) was a slave from Macon, Georgia who posed as a white male planter to escape from slavery. She escaped to the North in December 1848 by traveling openly by train and steamboat with her husband, who acted as her slave servant; they reached Philadelphia and freedom on Christmas Day.
- Harriet Jacobs (1813 or 1815 – March 7, 1897), author of Incidents in the Life of a Slave Girl, now considered a classic of American literature.
- Harriet Tubman (born Araminta Harriet Ross; 1820 – March 10, 1913) was an African American abolitionist, humanitarian, and Union spy during the American Civil War. Born into slavery, Tubman escaped and subsequently made more than thirteen missions to rescue more than 70 slaves; she guided refugees along the network of antislavery activists and safe houses known as the Underground Railroad. She later helped John Brown recruit men for his raid on Harpers Ferry, and in the post-war era struggled for women's suffrage.
- Lucy Terry (c. 1730–1821) is the author of the oldest known work of literature by an African American.
- Margaret Garner (called Peggy) (c. 1833/1834–c.1858) was an enslaved African American woman in pre-Civil War United States who was notorious—or celebrated—for killing her own daughter after being captured following her escape, rather than allowing the child to be returned to slavery.
- Phillis Wheatley (May 8, 1753 – December 5, 1784) was the first African-American poet and the first African-American woman to publish a book.
- Sojourner Truth (c. 1797 – November 26, 1883) was the self-given name, from 1843 onward, of Isabella Baumfree, an African American abolitionist and women's rights activist. Truth was born into slavery in Swartekill, Ulster County, New York. In 1826, she escaped with her infant daughter to freedom. After going to court to recover her son, she became the first black woman to win such a case against a white man. Her best-known extemporaneous speech on gender inequalities, "Ain't I a Woman?", was delivered in 1851 at the Ohio Women's Rights Convention in Akron, Ohio. During the Civil War, Truth helped recruit black troops for the Union Army; after the war, she tried unsuccessfully to secure land grants from the federal government for former slaves.

== See also ==
- History
  - Slavery among Native Americans
  - Slavery in the colonial history of the United States
  - Colonial American bastardy laws
  - History of sexual slavery in the United States
  - Enslaved women's resistance in the United States and Caribbean
  - Human trafficking in the United States
- Marriage and procreation
  - History of sexual slavery in the United States
  - Marriage of enslaved people (United States)
  - Slave breeding in the United States
  - Partus sequitur ventrem
  - Children of the plantation
- Other
  - The Bondwoman's Narrative
  - Industrial slave
  - Slave insurance in the United States
  - African-American Women Work Songs
- Female slavery in the Muslim world
