= Children of the plantation =

Mixed race children of slave women and white men, often via rape

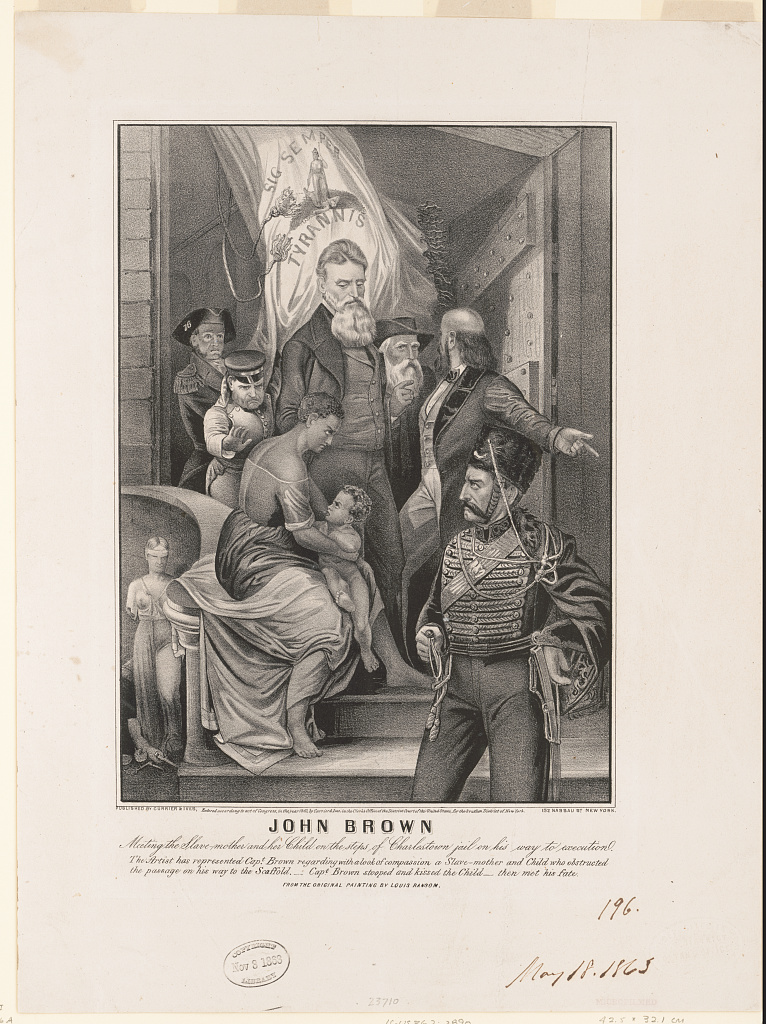
A rare instance of a mixed race baby portrayed next to the baby's darker mother. John Brown, about to be hanged, kisses the baby. Louis Ransom, 1863, reproduced as a Currier & Ives print.

"Children of the plantation" is a euphemism referring to people with ancestry tracing back to the time of slavery in the United States in which the offspring was born to black African female slaves (either still in the state of slavery or freed) in the context of the trans-Atlantic slave trade and non-black men, usually the slave's owner, one of the owner's relatives, or the plantation overseer. These children were often considered to be the property of the slave owner and were often subjected to the same treatment as other slaves on the plantation. Many of these children were born into slavery and had no legal rights, as they were not recognized as the legitimate children of their fathers. The men who fathered these children often used their power and authority to rape the black women who were under their control. Sometimes, girls as young as 13 were mothers in this case.

Plantation owners raping enslaved women was a common occurrence. These children were born into slavery, through a legal doctrine known as partus sequitur ventrem. They were classified as mulattoes, a former term for a multiracial person. Some of the fathers treated these children comparatively well, sometimes providing educational or career opportunities, or manumitting (freeing) them. Examples are Archibald and Francis Grimké, and Thomas Jefferson's children by Sally Hemings. Others treated their multiracial children as property; Alexander Scott Withers, for instance, sold two of his children to slave traders, where they were sold again.

Alex Haley's Queen: The Story of an American Family (1993) is a historical novel, later a movie, that brought knowledge of the "children of the plantation" to public attention. Edward Ball's Slaves in the Family (1998), written by a white descendant of slave owners, describes this complex legacy. Toni Morrison wrote that this sexual usage of slaves was known as droit du seigneur, the "right of the lord", a term originating in the feudalism of medieval Europe.

== See also ==
- Enslaved women's resistance in the United States and Caribbean
- Female slavery in the United States
- Jefferson–Hemings controversy regarding the sexual relationship between Thomas Jefferson and his slave, Sally Hemings, resulting in six children.
- Julia Chinn, an enslaved octoroon who was the common-law wife of the ninth vice president of the United States, Richard Mentor Johnson.
- Plaçage, interracial common-law marriages in French and Spanish America, including New Orleans
- Slave breeding in the United States
- Slavery in the colonial history of the United States
