= Slave breeding in the United States =

Former prevalent economic practice in the US

Slave breeding was the practice in slave states of the United States of slave owners systematically forcing slaves to have sexual relations and bear children. It included coerced sexual relations between slaves; forced pregnancies of female slaves; and forced breeding of specific slaves in hopes of producing relatively stronger future slaves. The objective was for slave owners to increase the number of people they enslaved without incurring the cost of purchase, to fill labor shortages caused by the abolition of the Atlantic slave trade, and to promote desired physical characteristics.

== Historical context ==
=== End of the American transatlantic slave trade ===
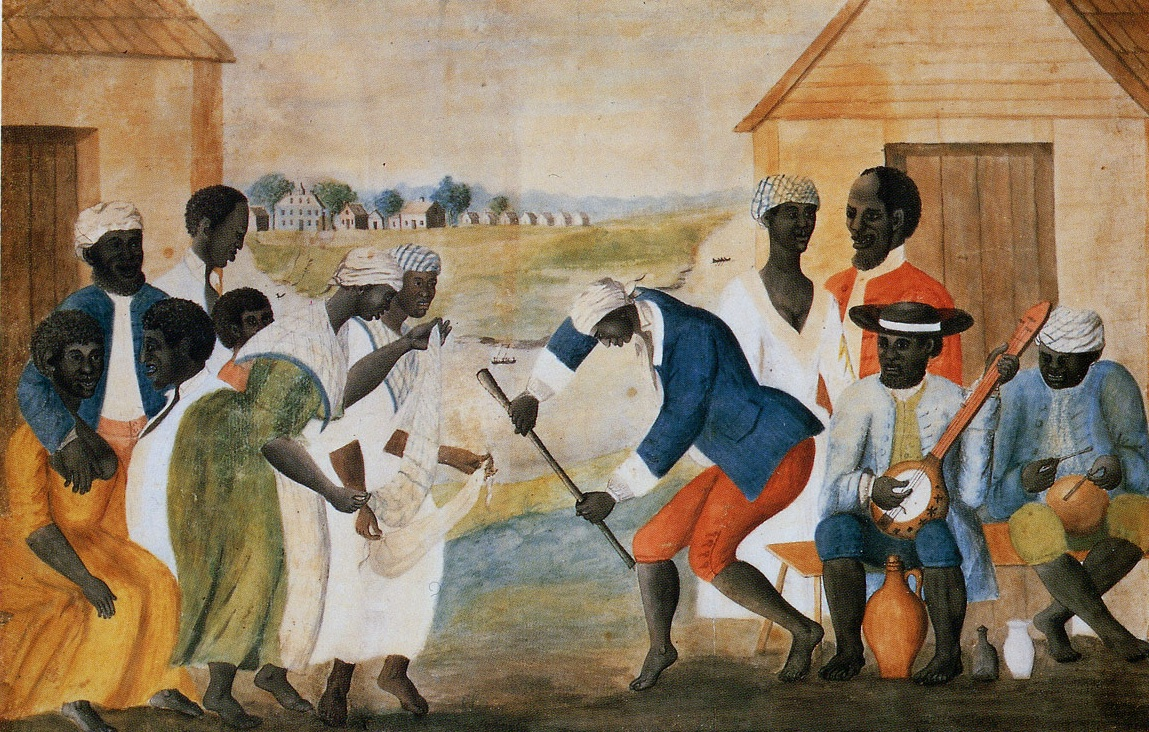
Enslaved people dancing on a South Carolina plantation. The Old Plantation, c. 1790.

The laws that ultimately abolished the Atlantic slave trade came about as a result of the efforts of British abolitionists, Christian groups such as the Society of Friends, and Evangelicals led by William Wilberforce, whose efforts through the Committee for the Abolition of the Slave Trade led to the passage of the 1807 Slave Trade Act by the British parliament. This led to increased calls for abolition in America, supported by members of the U.S. Congress from both the North and the South, as well as President Thomas Jefferson.

At the same time that the importation of enslaved Africans was being restricted or eliminated, the United States was undergoing a rapid expansion of cotton, sugarcane, and rice production in the Deep South and the West. The invention of the cotton gin enabled the profitable cultivation of short-staple cotton, which could be produced more widely than other types; this led to the economic preeminence of cotton throughout the Deep South. Enslaved people were treated as a commodity by owners and traders alike, and were regarded as the crucial labor for the production of lucrative cash crops that fed the triangular trade.

The enslaved people were treated as chattel assets, similar to the legal treatment of farm animals. Enslavers passed laws regulating slavery and the slave trade, designed to protect their financial investments. According to language from the U.S. Supreme Court case Dred Scott v. Sandford, enslaved people "had no rights which the white man was bound to respect". On large plantations, enslaved families were separated for different types of labor. Men tended to be assigned to large field gangs. Workers were assigned to the task for which they were best physically suited, in the judgment of the overseer.

=== Breeding in response to end of slave imports ===
The prohibition on the importation of slaves into the United States after 1808 limited the supply of slaves in the United States. This came at a time when the invention of the cotton gin enabled the expansion of cultivation in the uplands of short-staple cotton, leading to clearing lands cultivating cotton through large areas of the Deep South, especially the Black Belt. The demand for labor in the area increased sharply and led to an expansion of the internal slave market. At the same time, the Upper South had an excess number of enslaved people because of a shift to mixed-crops agriculture, which was less labor-intensive than tobacco. To add to the supply of enslaved people, enslavers looked at the fertility of enslaved women as part of their productivity, and intermittently forced the women to have large numbers of children. During this time period, the terms "breeders", "breeding slaves", "child bearing women", "breeding period", and "too old to breed" became familiar.

Planters in the Upper South states started selling enslaved people to the Deep South, generally through slave traders such as Franklin and Armfield. Louisville, Kentucky, on the Ohio River was a major slave market and port for shipping slaves downriver by the Mississippi to the South. New Orleans had the largest slave market in the country and became the fourth largest city in the US by 1840 and the wealthiest, mostly because of its slave trade and associated businesses.

== Accounts of slaves ==
In the antebellum years, numerous individuals who escaped from slavery wrote about their experiences in books called slave narratives. Many recounted that at least a portion of enslavers continuously interfered in the sexual lives of the enslaved people, usually the women. The slave narratives also testified that enslaved women were subjected to rape; arranged marriages; forced intercourse and sexual violation by enslavers, their sons or overseers; and other forms of abuse.

The historian E. Franklin Frazier, in his book The Negro Family, stated that "there were masters who, without any regard for the preferences of their slaves, mated their human chattel as they did their stock." Ex-slave Maggie Stenhouse remarked, "Durin' slavery there were stockmen. They was weighed and tested. A man would rent the stockman and put him in a room with some young women he wanted to raise children from."

== Dynamics ==
=== Personhood to thinghood ===
Some experts suggest that there may have been several factors that coalesced to make the forced reproduction of enslaved people a common practice by the end of the 18th century, chief among them the enactment of laws and practices that transformed the view of enslaved people from "personhood" into "thinghood". In this way, enslaved people could be bought and sold as chattel without presenting a challenge to the religious beliefs and social mores of the society at large. All rights were to the enslaving owner, with the enslaved individual having no rights of self-determination either to their own person, spouse, or children.

Slaveholders began to assert that slavery was grounded in the Bible. This view was inspired in part by an interpretation of the Genesis passage "And he said, Cursed be Canaan; a servant of servants shall he be unto his brethren." (Genesis 9); Ham, son of Noah and father of Canaan, was deemed the antediluvian progenitor of the African people. Some white people used the Bible to justify the economic use of slave labor. The subjugation of the enslaved person was taken as a natural right of the white enslavers.

=== Demographics ===
In a study of 2,588 slaves in 1860 by the economist Richard Sutch, he found that on slave-holdings with at least one woman, the average ratio of women to men exceeded 2:1. The imbalance was greater in the "selling states", where the excess of women over men was 300 per thousand.

=== Natural increase vs systematic breeding ===
Ned Sublette, co-author of The American Slave Coast, states that the reproductive worth of "breeding women" was essential to the young country's expansion not just for labor but as merchandise and collateral stemming from a shortage of silver, gold, or sound paper tender. He concluded that enslaved people and their descendants were used as human savings accounts, with newborns serving as interest that functioned as the basis of money and credit in a market premised on the continual expansion of slavery.

Robert Fogel and Stanley Engerman reject the idea that systematic forced reproduction was a major economic concern in their 1974 book Time on the Cross: The Economics of American Negro Slavery. They argue that there is very meager evidence for the systematic breeding of slaves for sale in the market in the Upper South during the 19th century. They distinguish systematic "breeding"—the interference in normal sexual patterns—by enslavers with an aim to increase fertility or encourage desirable characteristics—from pronatalist policies, the generalized encouragement of large families through a combination of rewards, improved living and working conditions for fertile women and their children, and other policy changes by masters. They point out that the demographic evidence is subject to a number of interpretations. Fogel argues that when slave owners intervened in the private lives of slaves, it actually had a negative impact on population growth.

== See also ==
- Children of the plantation
- Enslaved women's resistance in the United States and Caribbean
- History of slavery in the United States
- Bibliography of slavery in the United States
- Marriage of enslaved people (United States)
- Rape and sexual abuse of slaves
- Treatment of slaves in the United States
- White slave propaganda
- Slave breeding in the Abbasid Caliphate
