= Enslaved women's resistance in the United States and Caribbean =

Enslaved women were expected to maintain the enslaved populations, which led women to rebel against this expectation via contraception and abortions. Infanticide was also committed as a means to protect children from either becoming enslaved or from returning to enslavement.

Scholars such as Stephanie M. H. Camp, Brenda Stevenson, Deborah Gray White and Eulanda Sanders have offered new takes on enslaved women's resistance efforts, with access to personal accounts by enslaved peoples. Historian Brenda E. Stevenson's research in her book, More Than Chattel: Black Women and Slavery in the Americas, uses interviews funded by the WPA of formerly enslaved women to reimagine enslaved women's experiences and self-image. The work of Stephanie M. H. Camp has framed the Black female body as a contested political battlefield within slavery, revealing diverse forms of resistance that challenged the institution's oppressive bounds. And Eulanda E. Sanders is a historian whose article, “Female Slave Narratives and Appearance: Assimilation, Experience, and Escape,” focuses on the portrayal of enslaved women's physical appearance in written accounts.

== Reproductive resistance ==
The ideologies surrounding the physical strength and fertility of African women were used to exploit African women throughout enslavement. While enslaved women were expected to perform manual labor equal to enslaved males, enslaved women were also expected to perform reproductive labor. For a slaver, it was more profitable to produce his own enslaved population than it was to purchase enslaved people. This desire for profits and increases in land size led to forced enslaved breeding, either with other enslaved males or their slavers. While some enslaved women were able to select their male partners, others were denied the freedom of choice and had a male partner forced onto them. Whether or not the male partner had been selected by the enslaved women, it was still expected of her to birth as many children as possible in order to increase profits for their slaver. Some enslavers also offered rewards for having additional children in order to encourage enslaved women to have children, enhancing their slaver's profits. In consequence, rebellion by enslaved women sometimes took the form of acting against these expectations.

Enslaved women often participated in acts of infanticide and abortion; historians describe these actions as forms of reproductive resistance. Under the industry of chattel slavery, slaves were bound for life, meaning their children would enter the cycle of enslavement. According to historian Brenda Stevenson, enslaved women were expected to maintain enslaved populations, which led women to rebel against this expectation via contraception and abortions. Infanticide was also committed to prevent children from either becoming enslaved or returning to enslavement.

== Contraception ==
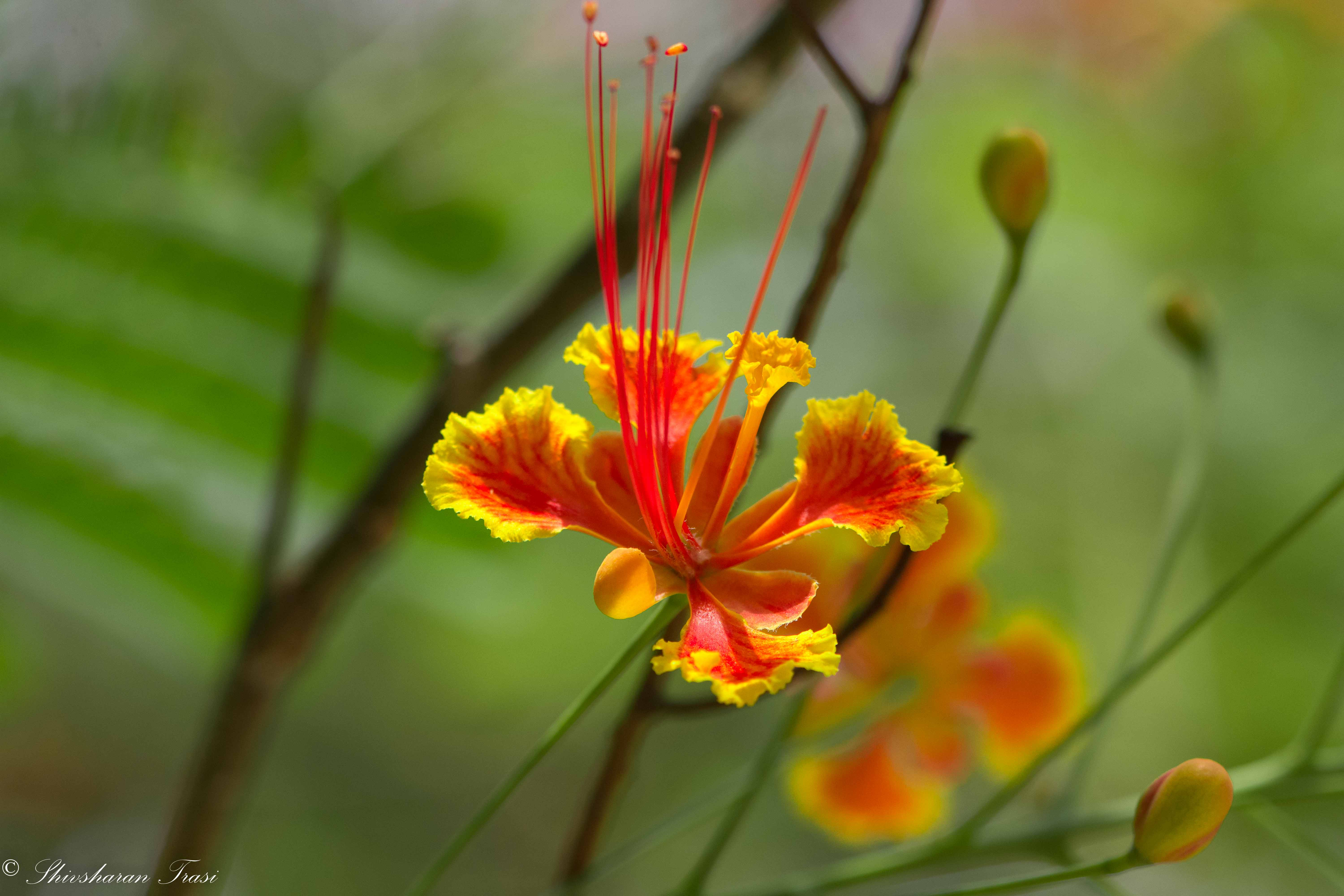
Caesalpinia pulcherrima, otherwise known as the "peacock flower", was used to induce abortion.

Contraception was an act of rebellion because it shifted the power and control from the enslaver to the enslaved. Since enslaved women were expected to maintain the enslaved populations, enslaved women used various methods to undermine this expectation. Abortions and contraceptives were also seen as a means for enslaved women to exercise agency over their bodies by allowing the women to control their ability to be impregnated. The peacock flower and the cotton root were plants that could be used as abortifacients. The use of cotton root was common, with other enslaved men worrying about their own population due to the high use of cotton root. In Maria Merian's Metamorphosis of the Insects of Surinam, she recorded that indigenous women used the plant to induce abortions. In the United States and Caribbean, both indigenous and enslaved women have used the peacock flower to abort pregnancies. By taking contraception and abortifacients, enslaved women were denying enslavers authority over their bodies; by not having children, enslaved women were limiting the profits enslavers could make off their bodies.

== Infanticide ==
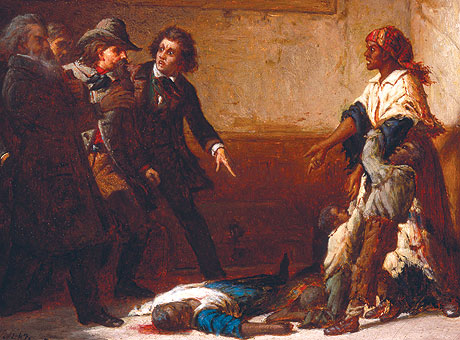
Margaret Garner as depicted in Harper's Weekly c.1867.

Infanticide was an act of rebellion because it allowed enslaved women to prevent the enslavement of their children. Due to partus sequitur ventrum, the principle that a child inherits the status of its mother, any child born to an enslaved woman would be born enslaved, part of the slaver's property. Because of this notion, some enslaved women were caught between wanting their children both alive and dead. This led to some women committing infanticide to protect their children from a life of slavery. One of the more notable cases of infanticide is that of Margaret Garner. While fleeing north with her husband and their four children, the Garners were caught at one of the homes they were hiding in. Although Garner planned to kill her children and then herself, she managed to kill one of her daughters and injured the others when marshals stormed the house searching for the Garner family. Garner was put on trial and indicted for property damage. Her remaining children, husband, and herself were returned to her slaver's brother in Louisiana.

Harriet Jacobs, a formerly enslaved woman who wrote about her experience, also had a traumatic motherhood experience. In her book, Incidents in the Life of a Slave Girl, Jacobs described how her owner threatened to take her children away from her if she didn't comply with his sexual advances.

=== Cultural and everyday resistance ===
Enslaved women demonstrated diverse strategies of rebellion through everyday acts of resistance that included self-autonomy over personal relationships with themselves and others. A new category of autobiographical accounts and slave narratives has allowed historians to study different forms of resistance outside the sexual exploitation of enslaved women, like expression of self through storytelling, healthy competition, physical appearance, and consensual acts of pleasure.

Historians such as Deborah G. White, Brenda Elaine Stevenson, and Eulanda E. Sanders contributed to this study of enslaved women navigating oppression by cultivating spaces of autonomy, intimacy, and resistance. According to Sanders, clear distinctions in the clothing enslaved people were given and had the right to was intentional to maintain a clear definition of status within the social hierarchy at the time. Sanders points to dress codes for slaves such as the South Carolina Negro Act of 1735 to demonstrate the amount of control enslavers had on enslaved people. Sander concludes that that data expressed two themes: “(a) components reflective of Control and (b) components that revealed physical and psychological Emancipation.” A widening interpretation of enslaved women's resistance efforts has led historians to look at various types of ways enslaved people carved out spaces of autonomy and emancipation from enslavement.

Historian Stephanie M. H. Camp investigates in her journal article, “The Pleasures of Resistance: Enslaved Women and Body Politics in the Plantation South, 1830–1861,” cases like Nancy Williams, whose interview according to Camp demonstrates that enslaved women took control back over their bodies to engage in acts of pleasure. Camp provides a window into the past by detailing the “clandestine and illegal parties” enslaved people held outside the plantation. Going beyond the geographic bounds that their enslavers had created, Camp refers to this act of resistance as rival geography. According to Camp, Nancy William's case details how women regained control over their bodies and free will through the physical movement and enjoyment of self-autonomy outside their enslaver's control.

“But we hada good time jes’ de same. Some time all de cou’tin’ couples slip ‘way an’ go to de wood to an ole cabin to dance...Dancin’ wid a glass o’ water on my head an’ three boys a-bettin' on me.” ^{- Nancy Williams}

== See also ==
- Heritage
  - African American genealogy
  - Atlantic Creole
  - Issue (genealogy)
- History
  - Colonial American bastardy laws
  - Female slavery in the United States
  - History of sexual slavery in the United States
  - Slavery in the colonial history of the United States
- Marriage and procreation
  - Legitimacy (family law)
  - Marriage of enslaved people (United States)
  - Partus sequitur ventrem
  - Plaçage, interracial common law marriages in French and Spanish America, including New Orleans
  - Sexual relations and rape
  - Sexual slavery
  - Slave breeding in the United States
