= Diana Cephas =

Plaintiff in St. Louis freedom suit (1840)

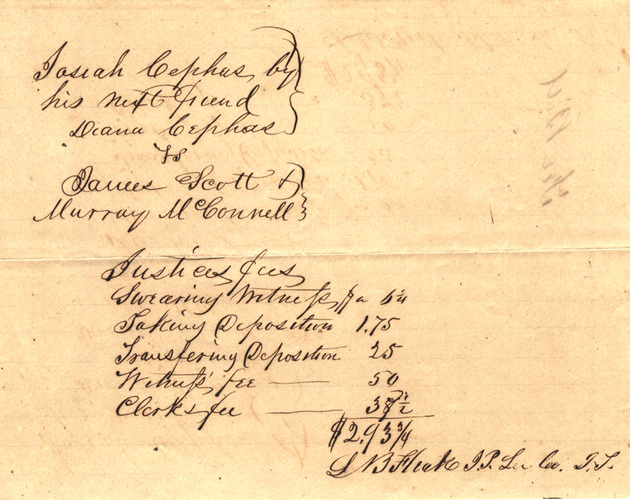
Bill for court fees (1841) for Josiah Cephas & Diana Cephas v. James Scott & Murray McConnell

Diana Cephas was the plaintiff in a freedom suit filed in St. Louis, Missouri in 1840. She won her case after it went to trial in the Circuit Court of St. Louis County in 1843. Born into slavery in Maryland, she and her young son Josiah had been taken to the free state of Illinois in 1839, where she was hired out by her slaveholder over several months. She was then taken to Missouri, a slave state, but won her freedom with the help of freedom suit attorney Francis B. Murdoch, despite the efforts of lawyers Myron Leslie and Roswell M. Field to discredit her.

== Background ==
Both Diana and her son Josiah had been born into slavery in the state of Maryland. Josiah was born in April 1838.

In 1839, Diana and Josiah were taken to the free state of Illinois by slaveholder Mark Delahay and his wife. Delahay settled in Naples, Illinois in July 1839 and hired Diana out to Ross Hughes for months at a time, collecting her wages. In August 1839, Mrs. Delahay died. Six months later, Delahay went south, leaving Diana and Josiah behind in Illinois.

In February 1840, they were taken captive by Murray McConnell, who claimed to own them. Diana stated that McConnell took her "forcibly and against her will" by steamboat to St. Louis, and held her there in slavery together with her son. Mark Delahay later claimed that he had in fact sold his slaves to McConnell in St. Louis for $1,100.

== Freedom suit ==
On October 22, 1840, attorney Francis B. Murdoch submitted two petitions in the Circuit Court of St. Louis County on behalf of Diana Cephas and two-year-old Josiah. They were promptly granted permission to sue by Judge Luke E. Lawless. A second set of lawsuits was submitted on behalf of Diana Cephas in 1841, but her case did not come to trial until September 18, 1843. Josiah died on July 19, 1842, one year prior to the trial.

Only Diana's case moved forward. McConnell's lawyers Myron Leslie and Roswell M. Field brought forward witnesses claiming that Diana was a runaway slave. By claiming that Diana had run away to Illinois, Leslie and Field could argue that she had to be returned to her rightful owner under the Federal Fugitive Slave Law.

Nevertheless, Diana ultimately prevailed and won her freedom, based on the legal precedent of "once free, always free" which had been established by Winny v. Whitesides in the Missouri Supreme Court in 1824. The rule of freedom by residence meant that an enslaved person who was taken to a free territory to live or work with the consent of their enslaver could sue for their freedom, even if they had been taken back to a territory allowing slavery.

Diana Cephas's victory in court came soon after the Polly Wash and Lucy Berry won their freedom suits, also in St. Louis. Roswell Field, lawyer for the slaveowner in his first slave case, went on to represent several enslaved plaintiffs in freedom suits before agreeing to represent Dred Scott in the United States Circuit Court for the District of Missouri.
