= Francis B. Murdoch =

American lawyer and newspaper publisher (1805–1882)

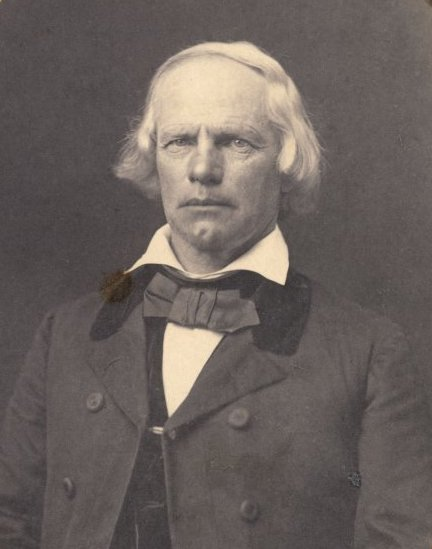
- Born: Francis Butter Murdoch; March 21, 1805; Cumberland, Maryland, U.S.
- Died: May 10, 1882 (aged 77); San Jose, California, U.S.
- Occupations: Attorney; Newspaper publisher
- Known for: Freedom suits attorney Founder of San Jose Telegraph

Francis Butter Murdoch (March 21, 1805 – May 10, 1882) was an American attorney and newspaper publisher. As a lawyer, he practiced law in Pennsylvania, Michigan, Illinois and Missouri, and initiated freedom suits for Dred Scott and Harriet Robinson Scott in 1846. Between 1840 and 1847, Murdoch filed nearly one-third of all freedom suits in St. Louis, and secured freedom for many of his clients who had been enslaved, including Polly Berry and her daughter, Lucy A. Delaney. Before that, Murdoch was the city attorney in Alton, Illinois, where he unsuccessfully prosecuted rioters who killed Elijah Parish Lovejoy, an anti-slavery newspaper publisher, in 1837.

After moving to California in 1852, Murdoch became a newspaper publisher and editor of the San Jose Telegraph, which later became The Mercury News, and founded the San Jose Patriot.

== Early life and education ==
Murdoch was born on March 21, 1805, in Cumberland, Allegany County, Maryland. He attended an academy in Bedford, Pennsylvania, at the age of 19. He read law under Judge Alexander Thomson and was admitted to the bar in Pennsylvania. Francis Murdoch and Eliza Kimmel were members of the Presbyterian Church at Bedford, where they were married in 1828.

== Early career ==
In 1830, Murdoch moved with his wife Eliza's family to Michigan, where he co-founded and laid out the city of Berrien Springs, Michigan, later the county seat for Berrien County. Aside from establishing a homestead there, Murdoch worked as an attorney. He was the county's first lawyer. His two-story cabin was one of the first such residences in Michigan, and is now among the oldest surviving buildings in the state.

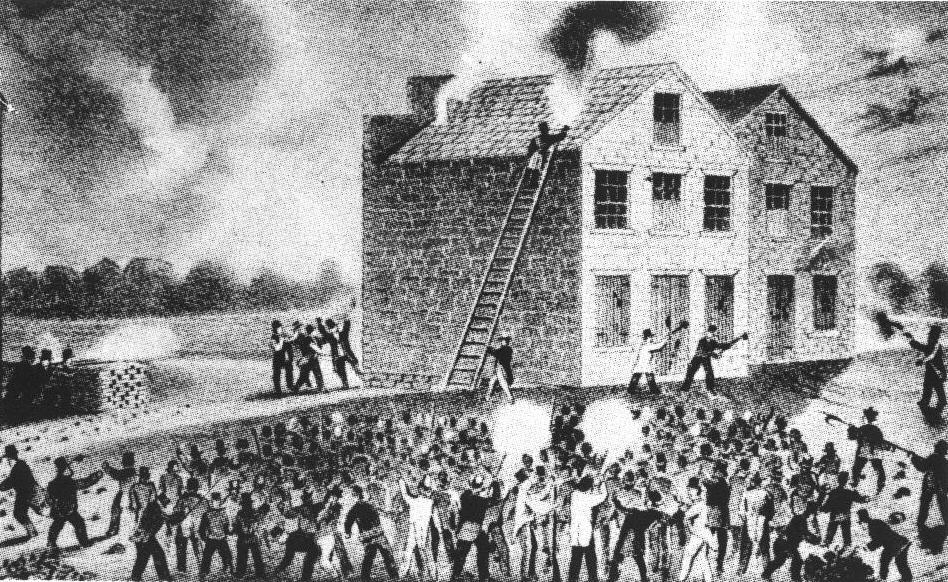
Wood engraving of the pro-slavery mob setting fire to Gilman & Godfrey's warehouse, where Elijah P. Lovejoy hid his printing press

After the death of his wife Eliza in 1835, he practiced law in Madison County, Illinois. As the Alton city attorney, Murdoch prosecuted members of proslavery and antislavery mobs that destroyed property and killed several people, including Elijah P. Lovejoy, during the 1837 Alton riot. According to historical accounts, Murdoch was "fair and impartial" and applied the law equally on both sides, although he clearly sympathized with opponents of slavery. Despite his efforts, Murdoch was unable to convince a jury to convict anyone. Disillusioned, he resigned and closed his law practice in Illinois.

== Freedom suits ==
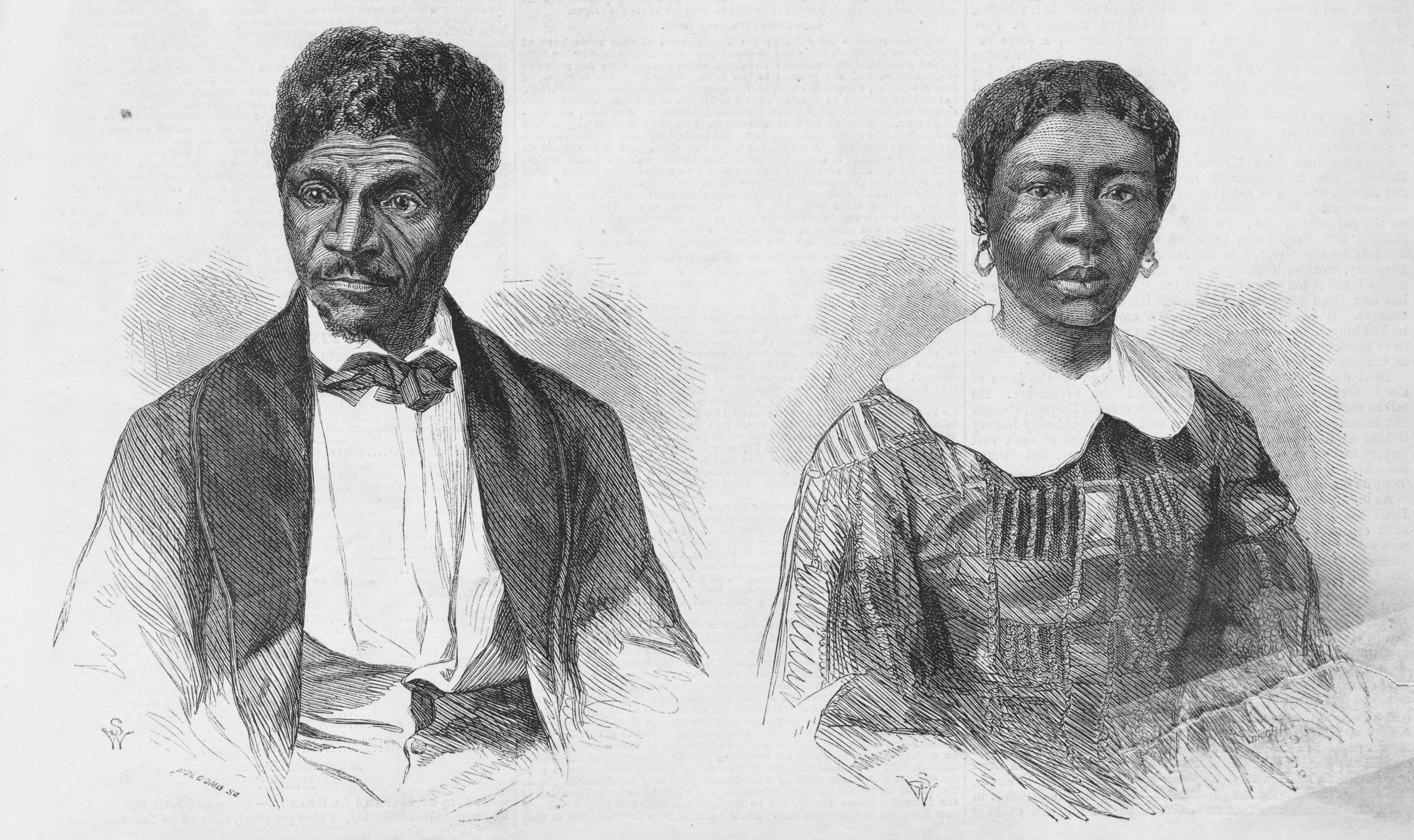

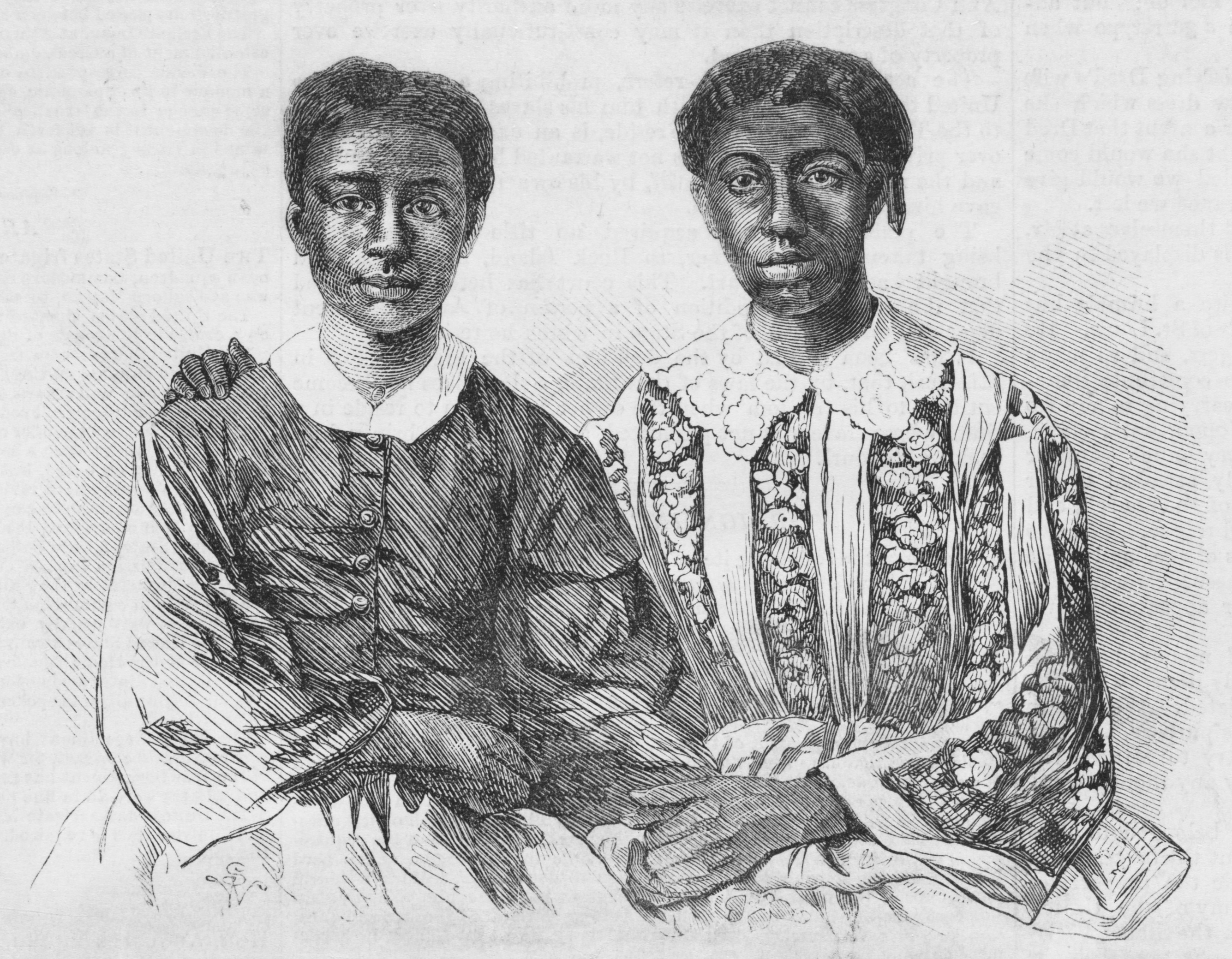
The Scott v. Emerson case centered on Dred and Harriet Scott (top) and their children, Eliza and Lizzie.

Murdoch moved to St. Louis, where he practiced law with two other lawyers, Ferdinand Risque and Gustavus Bird. He was also admitted to the United States District Court for Missouri. Murdoch, Risque and senior partner Bird sometimes worked together on freedom suits, but also worked individually.

Francis B. Murdoch has been called "one of the most important slave attorneys in the history of the St. Louis freedom suits." He filed roughly one-third of all known freedom suits between 1840 and 1847, always on behalf of the enslaved plaintiffs.

Murdoch represented Polly Berry and her daughter Lucy A. Delaney, together with lawyer Edward Bates. In Delaney's autobiography, From the Darkness Cometh the Light, he is referred to as "Mr. Murdock." He also represented Diana Cephas and her son Josiah. Murdoch helped many of his clients establish their freedom, but in doing so, angered and annoyed slaveholders and proslavery groups. On one occasion in 1843, he found it necessary to seek an injunction to prevent a group of prominent citizens from interfering with a client.

On April 6, 1846, Murdoch filed the initial papers for Dred Scott v. Irene Emerson, as well as Harriet v. Irene Emerson in the Circuit Court for St. Louis County. In doing so, the Scotts became the first and only married couple to file freedom suits in tandem. Murdoch also posted the bonds for the Scott family, taking responsibility for their legal costs. Historians have suggested that Murdoch may have been introduced to the Scotts through Reverend John R. Anderson of the Second African Baptist Church, where Harriet Scott was a member. Anderson had also lived in Alton, Illinois, where he worked as a typesetter for Elijah Lovejoy's abolitionist newspaper.

The Scotts' freedom suits were the last ones he filed in St. Louis, and Murdoch was unable to personally take their cases to trial. Later that year, his mortgage was foreclosed, and his house was sold by the sheriff. His creditor, former Judge Bryan Mullanphy, had had a long-running dispute with one of his law partners. Murdoch abruptly left town with his wife and nearly all of his children, taking them to one of his brothers in Michigan, before eventually settling in California. One of his daughters stayed behind in St. Louis, in the care of his father-in-law.

== Newspaper publishing ==
Murdoch headed to the West Coast in May 1852, settling in San Jose, California, in September of that year. He was admitted to the bar of Santa Clara County and the District Court in San Francisco.

=== San Jose Telegraph ===
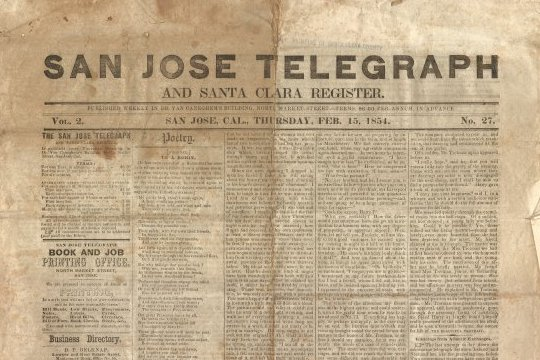
San Jose Telegraph and Santa Clara Register, February 15, 1854 (Vol. 2, No. 27)

In 1853, Murdoch took over the Santa Clara Register from John C. Emerson and changed its name to the San Jose Telegraph. The Telegraph offices were above a saloon between First and Market Street in San Jose. Previously a Whig newspaper, the Telegraph became Republican in 1854, in opposition to the Kansas–Nebraska Act.

As editor of the San Jose Telegraph, Murdoch covered the Dred Scott case without disclosing that he once represented the Scott family. On April 28, 1857, he wrote of the frustrations of representing enslaved litigants in court:

The advocate who pleads against slavery wastes his voice in its vaulted roof, and upon ears stuffed sixty years with cotton. His case is judged before it’s argued, and his client condemned before he is heard.

Writing for the Telegraph, F. B. Murdoch came to be regarded as "among the best known political writers in the State." He supported Republican Party beliefs opposing slavery and advocated for California Territory to be free.

In April 1856, prior to the Republican National Convention, the Telegraph endorsed General John C. Frémont for President and Francis Preston Blair for Vice President.

He ran the San Jose Weekly Telegraph until the fall of 1860, when he sold it to William Neill Slocum. In 1861, the paper was merged into the San Jose Weekly Mercury, which continues today as The Mercury News.

=== San Jose Patriot ===
In 1863, Francis B. Murdoch bought out the San Jose Tribune and renamed it as the San Jose Weekly Patriot, which became a daily paper after a few years. He ran the San Jose Daily Patriot and the Daily Evening Patriot until 1875. After Murdoch sold the paper, it became known as the San Jose Daily Herald.

== Personal life ==
By 1829, Murdoch was married to Eliza Kimmel, and their son George was born on August 29 of that year in Bedford, Pennsylvania. They also had another child. The Murdochs moved to Berrien County, Michigan, in 1830. His father-in-law gave Eliza and her siblings each several acres of the 10,000 acres that he owned to establish their own homesteads.

The cabin in which they lived was one of the first two-story cabins built in the state of Michigan and, now located at Courthouse Square in Berrien Springs, it is also one of the oldest surviving structures in the state.

In 1835, the Murdochs left Michigan, headed for New Orleans, for a better climate for Eliza's health. She died along the way of consumption (tuberculosis) and was buried in Ohio at the Oak Dale Cemetery in the town of Urbana.

Murdoch married Mary Johnson in 1838 in St. Louis, Missouri. She was the daughter of Colonel John W. Johnson, a former mayor of St. Louis, and Tapissee, the daughter of the Sauk Chief Keokuk. In 1839, Murdoch became active in the Swedenborgian Church and hosted occasional meetings in his home.

In 1844, Murdoch married Mary E. Graham (1827–1870), the daughter of Mary Kimmel and John Graham. Their first child was born in 1842. They also had six children born between 1847 and 1864: Graham, Francis W., Ella H., Maria E., Henry P., Grace, and Robert. Mary Graham Murdoch died in 1870.

Francis B. Murdoch died on May 10, 1882, after a severe stroke which had paralyzed him. He was buried next to his wife, Mary Elizabeth Murdoch, in the Oak Hill Memorial Park in San Jose.

At least two of Murdoch's sons, George and Francis, moved to Berrien Springs and established their own careers as newspapermen.
