= Robert Wash =

American judge (1790–1856)

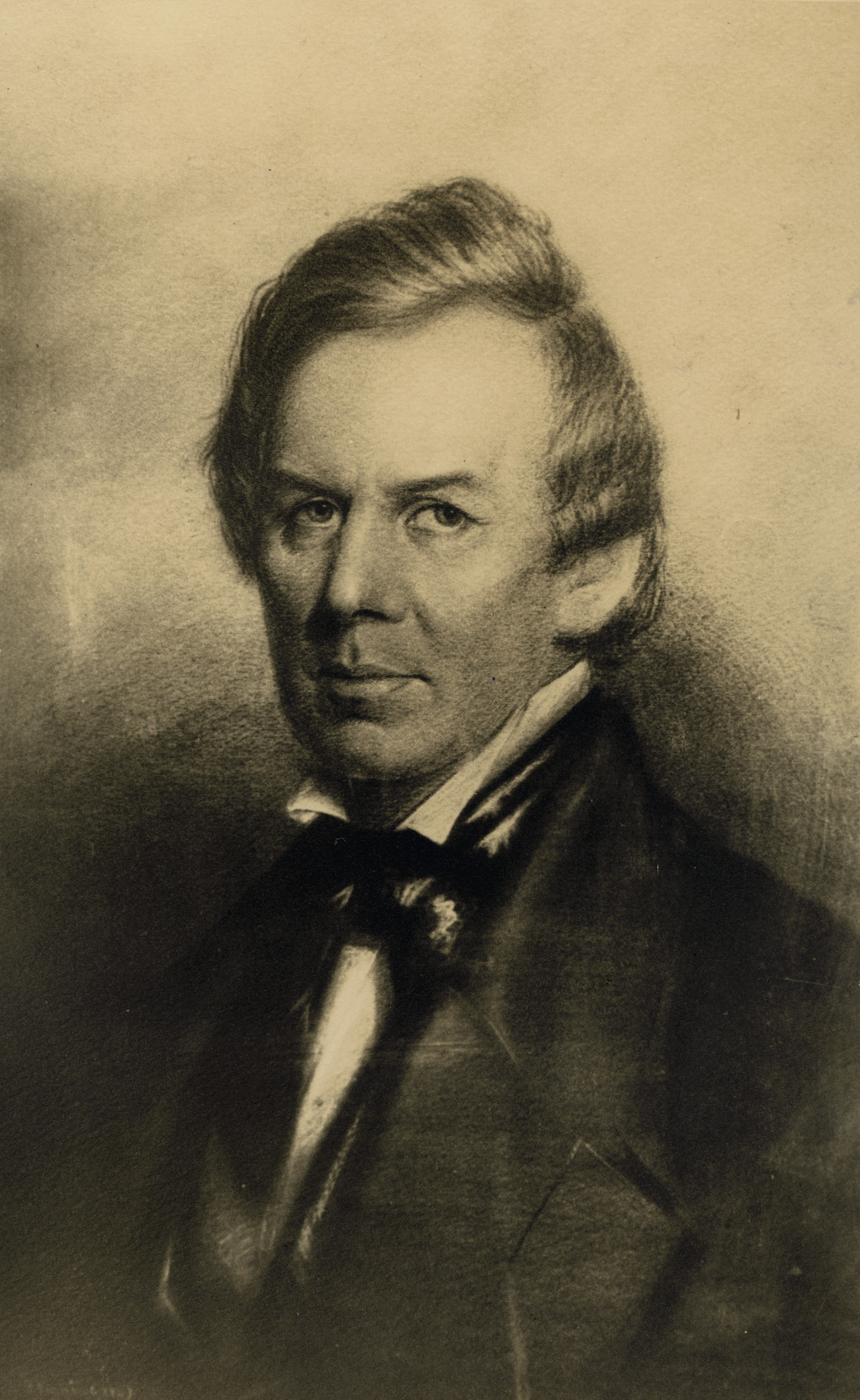

Missouri Supreme Court Justice
- In office 1825–1837
- Preceded by: Rufus Pettibone
- Succeeded by: John Cummins Edwards

Personal details
- Born: November 29, 1790 Louisa County, Virginia, US
- Died: November 30, 1856 (aged 66) St. Louis, Missouri, US
- Resting place: Bellefontaine Cemetery
- Spouse(s): Frances Christy Berry; Eliza Catherine Lewis Taylor (1837–1856)

Robert Wash (November 29, 1790 – November 30, 1856) served on the Supreme Court of Missouri from September 1825 to May 1837. During his term, the pro-slavery judge, who owned slaves himself, wrote the dissenting opinion on several important freedom suits, including Milly v. Smith, Julia v. McKinney and Marguerite v. Chouteau. However, he did join in the unanimous finding for the plaintiff in the landmark Rachel v. Walker case.

Judge Wash's decision to split up a family of slaves he owned was the impetus for Polly Wash's freedom suit and her daughter Lucy's memoir.

== Early life ==
Wash was born on November 29, 1790, in Louisa County, Virginia. He was the youngest of seven children born to William Wash and Anee Lipscomb Wash(born Anee Kennedy). His parents were wealthy enough to send him to William and Mary College. He graduated in 1808, at the age of 18, spent the following two years studying law, and was admitted to the bar.

In 1810, he settled in St. Louis in the Louisiana Territory (renamed the Missouri Territory when Louisiana joined the Union) and set up a law practice.

== Early public service ==
Acting Governor Frederick Bates appointed Wash to the position of Deputy Attorney General of the Louisiana Territory in November 1811.

During the War of 1812, Wash served as a lieutenant in Alexander McNair's mounted regiment and then as aide de camp on the staff of Benjamin Howard. Wash traveled with Howard on an expedition up the Mississippi River from St. Louis to Peoria as part of a plan to strike the Meskwaki and Sauk peoples campaigning with the British. But, as the bulk of fighting was occurring further east, Howard's soldiers saw few of these warriors.

When Missouri gained statehood in 1821 and St. Louis was incorporated, Wash was elected to its first nine-member board of aldermen. During his tenure, Wash worked to promote road structure and related improvements for the city, such as sidewalks and proper road surfacing and grading. He was also active in making upgrades to the harbor and levee. Wash was prescient in his thinking that unless proper dikes were built, the west side of the river channel would eventually be choked with sand bars, a situation that did come to pass.

During his first term, President James Monroe appointed Wash U.S. District Attorney for the district of St. Louis.

== Missouri Supreme Court ==
After the death of Judge Rufus Pettibone, Wash was appointed to the Supreme Court of Missouri. Taking his seat in September 1825, Judge Wash performed his duties until his resignation in May 1837. At the time, the state supreme court consisted of only three members. The head of the court was, and is, known by the honorific "Justice," the others by the title "Judge."

A number of notable cases were decided during Judge Wash's term. Many of these were suits in which slaves petitioned for their freedom. At the end of 1824, the Missouri General Assembly passed a law providing a process for enslaved persons to sue for freedom and have some protections in the process. The years between 1824 and 1844 are considered the "golden age" of freedom suits since many slaves won their freedom in these years. Following the Dred Scott decision, in which the "once free, always free" precedent was overturned, very few slaves pressed successful suits.

The following are important cases heard by Judge Wash.

=== Milly v. Smith (1829) ===
In 1826, bankrupt, elderly miller David Shipman's creditors seized and sold two of his slaves to satisfy a portion of his debt. Faced with further foreclosure, the Kentucky resident asked his adult nephew, Stephen Smith, to provide security for him. Shipman deeded him the mortgage on his land and other property, then fled to Indiana with his remaining seven slaves. In Jefferson County, he signed manumission papers for them, effectively freeing Milly, her three children and two young men.

The entire group continued on to Illinois where they took up residence in a Quaker community. Shipman told his new neighbors the black persons in his household were free. They later testified the former slaves were permitted to come and go as they pleased.

Meanwhile, Stephen Smith was unhappy with his uncle's departure and his obligation to settle Shipman's debt. Having plans himself to resettle in St. Louis, Smith hoped to discover his uncle's whereabouts and recover the slaves as “portable wealth.”

Catching up with Shipman in Illinois, Smith confronted his uncle, who acknowledged his debt, noting that he had left sufficient property in Kentucky to satisfy any foreclosure. Smith, however, wanted the slaves. In early 1827, he kidnapped five of the individuals and relocated them to St. Louis. Members of the Quaker community pursued Smith and reseized the group, intending to return them to Illinois.

In the resulting dispute, the five freed people pressed suit to re-establish their freedom from Smith in the Circuit Court of St. Louis. Milly and her children spent much of the next five years in jail as the freedom suits moved through the courts. In late March 1828, when the combined cases came to trial, the jury found in Smith's favor.

Two appeals reached the Missouri Supreme Court. In the final decision, Milly was freed. The court was split 2–1 with Judge Wash in the minority. Writing for majority, Justice McGirk stated:

"[T]he question submitted to us is, whether Milly is by law entitled to her freedom? When we only look to the facts in this case, we see on one side a man largely indebted, hiding his property, and in fact destroying it, to prevent his creditors from reaping any benefit there from, and in this case, Shipman has been base enough to emancipate the slave to injure and ruin his security. We feel disposed to view him in a light but little below that of a felon. But there are two sides to every question; here is also the case of a person claiming the benefit of the ordinance of Congress of 1787, for the government of the Northwestern Territory, which declares, that in that country there shall be neither slavery nor involuntary servitude."

In his dissent, Wash asserted that “the mortgagee is the legal owner. Various authorities have been cited on both sides for and against the position. Most clearly the mortgagor is not the full owner, he is at most but the qualified owner. In this case Shipman was the qualified owner for specific purposes, and had no right to emancipate the plaintiff in Kentucky or elsewhere; indeed, it seems to be conceded on all hands, that Shipman could not have emancipated Milly by his express deed, and why give indirect and fraudulent efforts and implied assent for effect than his deed could have? I incline to consider the plaintiff in the light of a purchaser from Shipman, with a full knowledge of Smith’s lien.”

=== Julia v. McKinney (1833) ===
In Julia v. McKinney, the Supreme Court of Missouri was faced with the decision of whether it should declare a slave free based on the laws of a free territory or state. Lucinda Carrington, the owner of a slave named Julia, lived in Kentucky. When Carrington announced her plan to move to Illinois with Julia, a neighbor warned her “that if she took [Julia] there she would be free.” In an attempt to evade the law, Carrington arrived in Pike County, Illinois with the slave, but asserted her intentions to hire Julia out in Missouri. For a month, Julia stayed with Carrington in Pike County, then was hired out 30 miles away in Louisiana, Missouri. When Julia fell ill, Carrington had her return to Illinois. When she recovered, Carrington sent her to St. Louis, where she was sold to S. McKinney.

Julia sued for her freedom in the Circuit Court of St. Louis County, naming her new owner as defendant. She contended that she and Carrington had lived in Illinois from late October to early December 1829. To Julia's disadvantage, the court's instructions to the jury centered on Carrington's intent, rather than her actions. If they believed Julia “was taken into the State of Illinois by her owner without any intention on the part of such owner to make that State the residence of Julia, that the plaintiff is not entitled to recover in this action.”

The jury returned a verdict against Julia, who appealed to the Supreme Court of Missouri. The upper court found in Julia's favor, dividing 2–1 with Judge Wash dissenting. Writing for the majority, Justice McGirk opined that the 6th article of the State of Illinois' constitution supported Julia's claim and declared that slavery would not be introduced into the state – "any violation of this article shall effect the emancipation of such person.”

To distinguish individuals passing through the state from those residing there, he continued, "We are of opinion that it is the undoubted right of every citizen of the United States to pass freely through every other State with his property of every description, including negro slaves, without being in any way subject to forfeit his property for having done so, provided he does not subject his property by a residence to the action of the laws of the State in which he may so reside.”

"In the case before us the owner of the slave was not an emigrant, but went into Illinois with an avowed view to make that State her home. She took up her residence there, with her slave in her possession, and kept the slave there for upwards of one month, and treated the slave in all respects as slaves are treated in States where slavery is allowed. These acts of the owner surely amounted to the introduction of slavery in Illinois.”

Judge Wash agreed that the lower court's jury instructions had been given in error, but insisted that intent was an essential element of residence. “A bare removal into the State can form no ground on which to set up the claim; especially when it is shown that the removal is not made with a view to residence. The intention of the owner as previously declared, is the only evidence that can exist in such a case...The intention with which a thing is done gives color and character to almost every trans[ac]tion.”

=== Marguerite v. Chouteau (1834) ===
Marguerite v. Chouteau was one of the last of several related freedom suits begun in about 1805 with a petition from a slave named Catiche. The granddaughter of a Natchez Indian woman, Catiche was nominally owned by a member of St. Louis' founding family, the Chouteaus. A territorial court found in Jean-Pierre Choteau Sr.'s favor. The decision was then reversed by the Circuit Court of St. Louis.

As Catiche's action moved forward, her sister Marguerite also sued Choteau for her freedom. The 1826 case hinged on the plaintiff's skin color, and whether she was red or black. Another important factor was whether the slave status of an Indian claimant, who had survived the transfer of Louisiana to Spain, continued under Spanish rule and remained under U.S. law. Enslavement of blacks was authorized under both French and Spanish law, whereas Indians were deemed free under the latter. The circuit court found for Chouteau, leading to an appeal before the Missouri Supreme Court.

On appeal, the lower court verdict held as the court split evenly with Judge Tompkins siding with the plaintiff, Judge Wash against, and Justice McGirk not sitting. With the agreement of all parties, the appeal was heard again in front of the full court. This time, McGirk and Tompkins found for Marguerite, on the basis the circuit court had erred in jury instruction, and ordered a new trial.

In his dissent, Judge Wash asserted that regardless of territorial transfer, the rights of the owners of Indian slaves "are secured and protected as well by the law of nations as by the express stipulations of the cession to the United States." The new trial was set for St. Charles County, but was transferred to Jefferson County, where after two trials, Marguerite was set free. The Supreme Court of Missouri reaffirmed the finding.

The case is considered an official end to Indian slavery in Missouri.

=== Rachel v. Walker (1834) ===
This freedom suit by an enslaved woman of color hinged on the question of whether or not a slave was forfeited if taken into territory where slavery was prohibited. Rachel's claim was based on a legal clause from a decade earlier that allowed slaves to petition for freedom based on their status as "poor people" with "limited rights and privileges."

Rachel had accompanied her master Lt. Thomas Stockton to Fort Snelling and Fort Crawford, both of which lay in Michigan Territory where the officer was stationed. As mandated by the Northwest Ordinance of 1787, slavery was outlawed in the region northwest of the Ohio River. At Fort Crawford, Rachel gave birth to a son, James Henry. Stockton later sold the pair to William Walker of St. Louis.

Rachel sued Walker for her liberty in 1834, saying she had lived in a free territory and according to the “once free, always free” precedent, was no longer a slave. The St. Louis Circuit Court found against Rachel, asserting that Stockton had no say in where he lived since that was decided by the Army. It was not his choice to take Rachel to a free territory, they reasoned, so she had no claim to freedom.

Rachel appealed to the Missouri Supreme Court in 1836. In a unanimous decision, the judges agreed with her claim. Speaking for the full court, Judge McGirk declared, Stockton's "voluntary act [was] done without any other reason than that of convenience," not necessity... "and those claiming under him must be holden to abide the consequences of introducing slavery both in Missouri territory and Michigan, contrary to law. The judgment of the Circuit Court is reversed."

The ruling in Rachel v. Walker was referenced as a precedent in the Dred Scott trials.

== Polly Wash v. Joseph M. Magehan (1839) ==
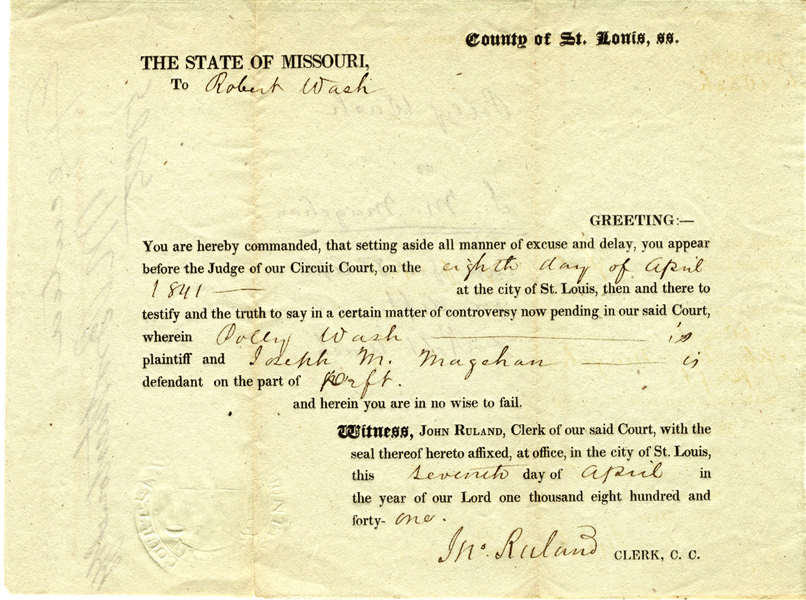
St. Louis Circuit Court Summons for Robert Wash in the case Polly Wash v. Joseph M. Magehan

Judge Wash was a witness for the Wash v. Magehan freedom suit and that of Polly Wash's daughter, Lucy. Major Taylor Berry had purchased Polly as a domestic servant. When Major Berry died in a duel, his widow married Judge Robert Wash, who was then responsible for Polly, who was married and had two daughters while with the Berry and Wash families. Polly was ultimately sold to Joseeph Magehan. Having lived for a time in the free state of Illinois, before she came to the Berry and Wash households, Polly sued Joseph Magehan for her freedom. Polly won her freedom and filed another freedom suit for her daughter, which was tried beginning in February 1844.

Judge Wash testified in Lucy's case that, "the defendant, Lucy A. Berry was a mere infant when he came in possession of Mrs. Fannie Berry's estate, and that he often saw the child in the care of its reputed mother Polly, and to his best knowledge and belief, he thought Lucy A. Berry was Polly's child." Harry Douglas, a former overseer on Wash's farm, corroborated the statement. Since Polly should have been free when she gave birth to Lucy, under partus sequitur ventrem, Lucy should have been free. The case was submitted to the jury, which decided in Lucy's favor.

== Personal life ==
Judge Wash married twice. By June 3, 1826, he was married to Frances (Fannie) Christy Berry, the daughter of Major William Christy, with whom he had a daughter, Frances. Frances traveled to Pensacola, Florida for her health and died there by February 6, 1829. His second wife, Eliza Catherine Lewis Taylor, the daughter of Colonel Nathaniel P. Taylor, had four sons: Robert, William, Clark and Pendleton, and five daughters: Elizabeth, Virginia, Julia, Medora and Edmonia.

Wash was an Episcopalian who served on the vestry of Christ Church.

He was also an indefatigable booster for the City of St. Louis, foreseeing a great future for the municipality. As soon as he was financially able, he began buying real estate. The properties laid the foundation for a considerable fortune, which enjoyed throughout his life.

In May 1818, Judge Wash was part of a group entering into an agreement to build a theater. A lot on Chestnut St. was purchased for the purpose and a foundation was constructed. But when funds ran out, the project was abandoned. A wood-frame livery stable took over the site.

Wash's colleagues noted he had a passion for hunting and kept a pack of hounds. One anecdote puts Wash on the bench when "an attorney who understood the judge's proclivity for sports of the field whispered to him that they had started three [foxes] at one time in the neighborhood of the judge's residence. He was immediately taken with severe cramps in the stomach, which rendered an adjournment of the court necessary. Within an hour he was in his saddle, following closely upon the heels of the hounds. These sudden attacks were of frequent occurrence..."

After retiring from the court, Wash lived among family and friends at his St. Louis home for the rest of his life. He died on November 30, 1856.

Political offices
Preceded by Rufus Pettibone	Justice of the Missouri Supreme Court; 1825–1837	Succeeded by John Cummins Edwards
