= David D. Mitchell =

American fur trader and regional superintendent of Indian Affairs (1806-1861)

David Dawson Mitchell
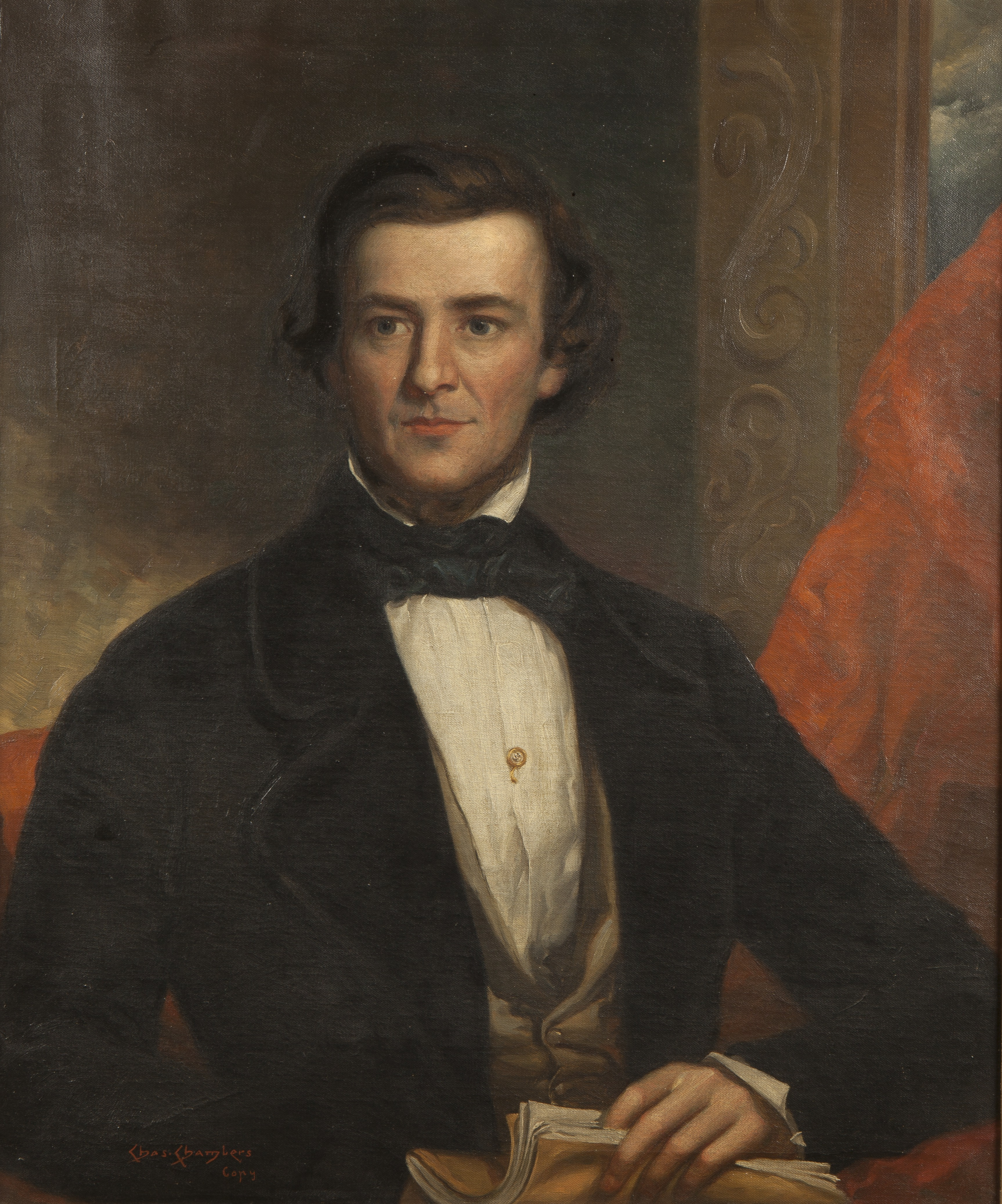
- Portrait of Col. David Dawson Mitchell by Charles Chambers (after Manuel Joachim De Franca), ca. 1900, Missouri History Museum

Superintendent of Indian Affairs at St. Louis
- In office 1841–1890

Superintendent of Indian Affairs at St. Louis
- In office 1849–1853

Personal details
- Born: David Dawson Mitchell; July 31, 1806 Louisa County, Virginia, United States
- Died: May 23, 1861 (aged 54) St. Louis County, Missouri, United States
- Occupation: Fur trader, Indian Affairs administrator

David D. Mitchell (July 31, 1806 – May 23, 1861) was an American fur trader and regional superintendent of Indian Affairs at St. Louis. For his service during the Mexican–American War, he was promoted to Lieutenant Colonel. He was the defendant in a freedom suit filed by Polly Berry for her daughter Lucy, who was owned by his wife Martha Eliza Berry's family before she was taken to the Mitchell residence.

== Early life ==
David Dawson Mitchell was born on July 31, 1806, in Louisa County, Virginia.

== Fur trapper ==
Mitchell began his career as a fur trapper in 1824 at St. Louis, Missouri. He became a leader of trappers and hunters within the fur trading companies, and then part owner of one of the companies. He worked at some point for the Ioway Outfit of the Western Department.

== Military ==
Mitchell enlisted in the United States Army at the start of the Mexican–American War, during which he rose to Lieutenant Colonel in recognition of his service during the Doniphan's Expedition. The unusually long expedition began in New Mexico, then Chihuahua, through Texas, and to New Orleans, after which he returned to Missouri.

== Regional superintendent of Indian Affairs ==
The Bureau of Indian Affairs sought to "civilize" Native Americans, which they believed fur traders were in the best position to assist with policy and enforcement. Mitchell, the superintendent at St. Louis, was considered to be "familiar with the Country, the Indian and the Mischief that we wish to remedy." Mitchell sought to actuate safe passage for westward pioneers as negotiated in the Treaty of Fort Laramie (1851), while he also wanted to ensure that Native Americans received a fair settlement for the travelers crossing through their traditional hunting lands, which greatly reducing the population of buffalo and other game. He said,

Humanity calls loudly for some interposition on the part of the American government to save, if possible, some portion of these ill-fated tribes; and this, it is thought, can only be done by furnishing them with the means, and gradually turning their attention to agricultural pursuits. Without some aid from the government, it will be impossible for them to make an attempt even as graziers.

— David D. Mitchell

== Personal life ==
In 1840, Mitchell married Martha Eliza Berry, daughter of Major Taylor Berry. Around that time, they received the young enslaved Lucy Berry from her sister Mary Berry and brother-in-law Henry Sidney Coxe. The couple suffered from the loss of their two infant children and Henry's alcoholism. Mary filed for divorce in 1845, citing her husband's drinking habit, severe temper, and abusive language. Mary withdrew the suit after Henry enumerated her faults. They agreed to stay married, but lived separately. When Mary died, he had her buried in the grounds his residence so that he could look over her grave.

=== Lucy Ann Delany freedom suit ===
Polly Berry filed a freedom suit on September 8, 1842, as a "next friend" of her daughter Lucy against Mitchell. According to the rule of partus sequitur ventrem, which had been adopted into US slave law, the status of children followed that of the mother. Since Lucy was born to a woman considered free at the time in Illinois, she should also have been free. Lucy was remanded to jail, where she was held for 17 months. Mitchell wanted to ensure that Lucy was kept in St. Louis until the trial. A $2,000 (equivalent to $66,724 in 2025) bond was established by Judge Bryan Mullanphy, should Mitchell try to reclaim Lucy. (Note: Lucy suggested in her memoir that Wash's attorneys proposed the strategy of filing separate suits for her and her daughter, to prevent a jury's worrying about taking too much property from one slaveholder.) Both Polly and Lucy were freed as the result of their individual cases.

== Death ==
Mitchell died of typhoid fever on May 23, 1861, at the Planter's House in St. Louis. He was buried at Calvary Cemetery in the city. His tombstone was demolished in 1951, as were many tombstones.

== Bibliography ==
- Trennert, Robert A. (1974). "The Fur Trader as Indian Administrator: Conflict of Interest or Wise Policy?" (PDF). South Dakota Historical Society. 5 (1): 1.
- Wong, Edlie L. (2009). Neither Fugitive nor Free: Atlantic Slavery, Freedom Suits, and the Legal Culture of Travel. New York University Press. ISBN 9780814794654.
