= Treaty of Fort Laramie (1851) =

Treaty on territorial claims of Native Americans

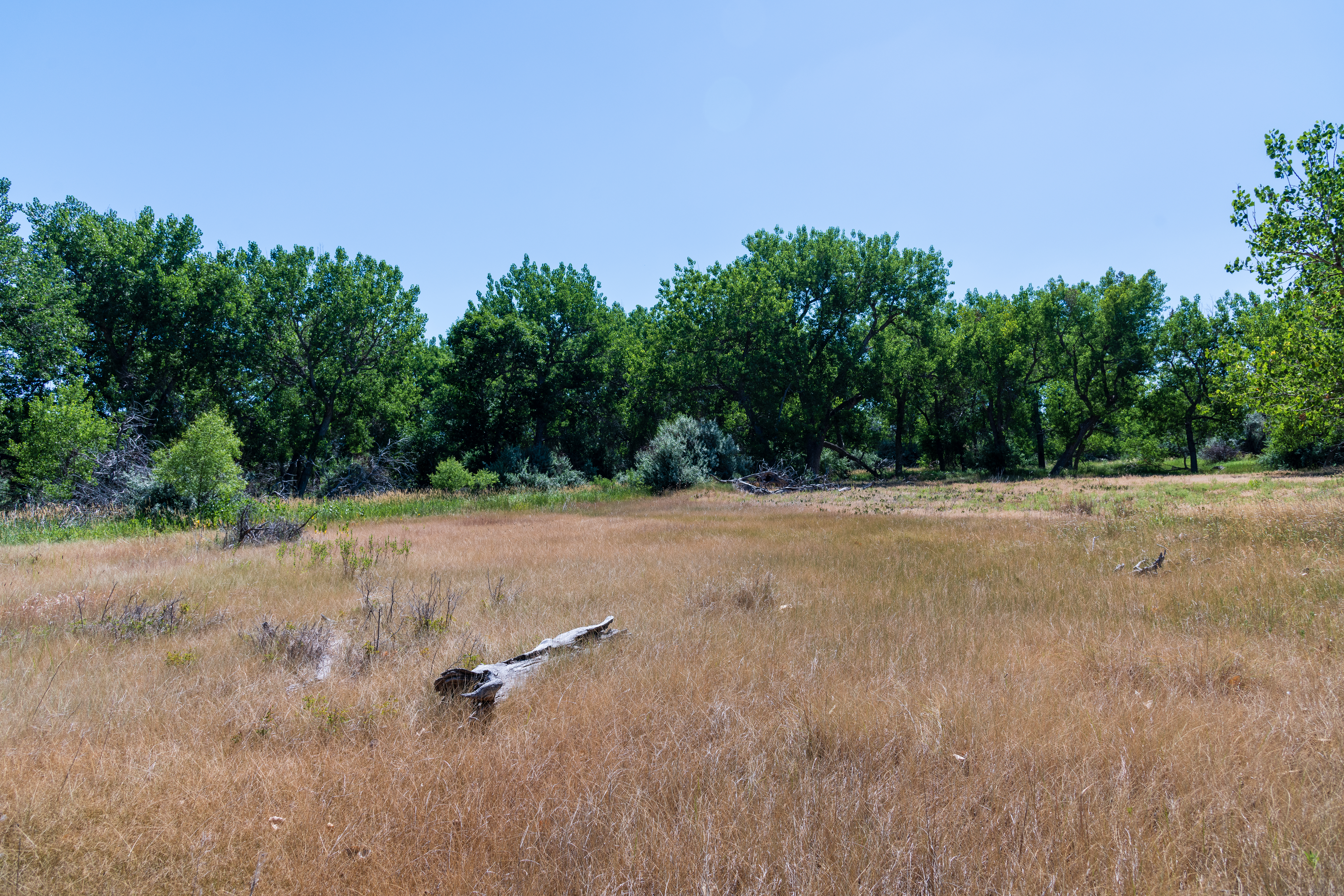
The campsite location of Fort Laramie Mounted riflemen in 1851 near the junction of the North Platte River and Horse Creek west of Morrill, Nebraska.

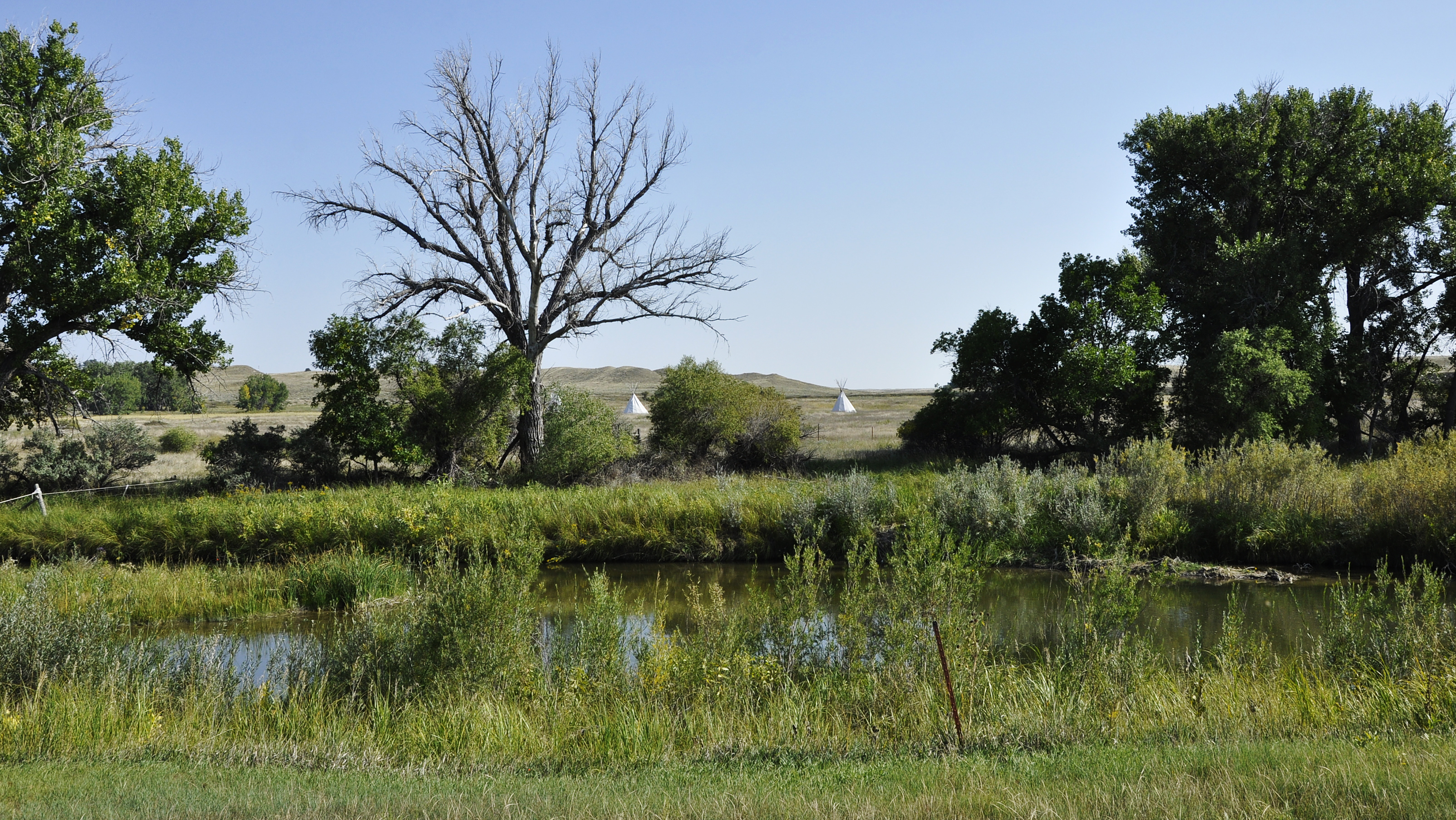
Fort Laramie National Historic Site, with tipis across Laramie River, where the treaty of 1868 was negotiated.

The Fort Laramie Treaty of 1851 was signed on September 17, 1851 between United States treaty commissioners and representatives of the Cheyenne, Sioux, Arapaho, Crow, Assiniboine, Mandan, Hidatsa, and Arikara Nations. Also known as Horse Creek Treaty, the treaty set forth traditional territorial claims of the tribes.

The United States acknowledged that all the land covered by the treaty was Indian territory and did not claim any part of it. The boundaries agreed to in the Fort Laramie Treaty of 1851 would be used to settle a number of claims cases in the 20th century. The Native Americans guaranteed safe passage for settlers on the Oregon Trail and allowed roads and forts to be built in their territories, in exchange for promises of an annuity in the amount of fifty thousand dollars for fifty years. The treaty also sought to "make an effective and lasting peace" among the eight tribes, who were often at odds with each other.

== Background ==
Although many European and European-American migrants to western North America had previously passed through the Great Plains on the Oregon and Santa Fe Trails, the California gold rush, beginning in 1848, resulted in a much larger flow of settlers. The next year, both Thomas Fitzpatrick (agent of Upper Platte and Arkansas) and David D. Mitchell (superintendent at Saint Louis) recommended a council with the tribes to prevent a conflict. The United States government negotiated with the Plains Tribes living between the Arkansas and Missouri rivers seeking to ensure protected right-of-way for the settlers. Congress had appropriated one hundred thousand dollars to the assembly, endorsed by Luke Lea (the Commissioner of Indian Affairs).

The treaty was negotiated and signed at the mouth of Horse Creek, 30 miles (48 km) downriver from Fort Laramie, because the area around Fort Laramie lacked food for the horses. Indigenous lore describe the treaty as the Horse Creek Treaty. Representatives from the Lakota Sioux (Red Fish, Lone Horn), Cheyenne, Assiniboine, Gros Ventre, Mandan, Arikara, Hidatsa, Shoshone, Crow (Big Robber, Sits-on-Edge-of Fortification), and Arapaho took part in the negotiations.

The United States Senate ratified the treaty, adding Article 5 which adjusted compensation from fifty to ten years. All tribes, with the exception of the Crow, accepted. Several tribes never received the commodities promised as payments.

== Treaty territory ==
The Lakota Sioux received exclusive treaty rights to the Black Hills (now in South Dakota), to the consternation of the Cheyenne and the Arapaho. "... the Sioux were given rights to the Black Hills and other country that the Northern Cheyennes claimed. Their home country was the Black Hills," declared a Cheyenne historian in 1967. Arapaho chief Black Coal complained in 1875: "I have never got anything yet for my land [the Black Hills]. It is part mine, and part the Sioux... In the first place, they came from the Missouri River and reached this place, and now they have got up this far, and they claim all this land."

The Cheyenne and Arapaho, the southernmost of the treaty tribes, held an area southward of the North Platte in common (now mainly in Wyoming and Colorado).

The Crow treaty territory (now in Montana and Wyoming) included the area westward from Powder River. Little Bighorn River ran through the center of the Crow domain.

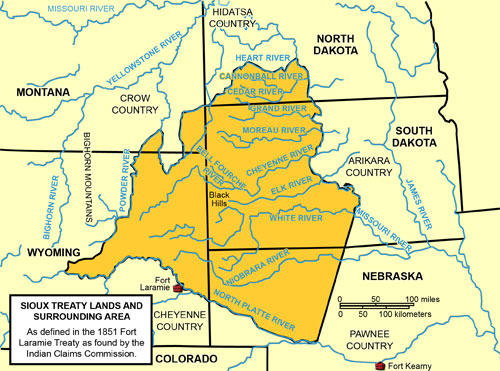
The Lands of the 1851 Ft. Laramie Treaty

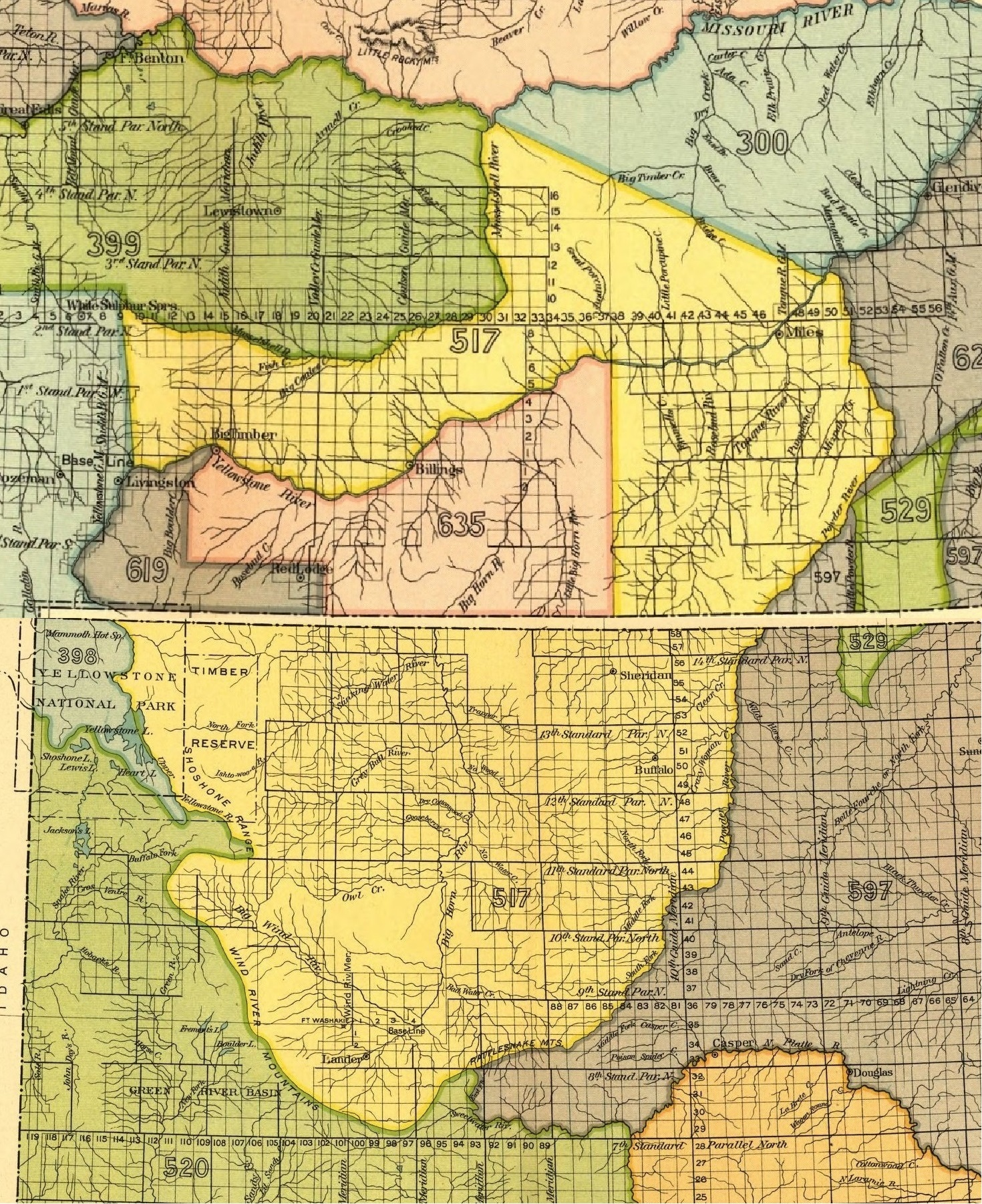
The Crow Indian territory (area 517, 619 and 635) as described in Fort Laramie Treaty (1851), now in Montana and Wyoming, included the western Powder River area and the Yellowstone area with tributaries like the Tongue River, the Rosebud River, and the Bighorn River.

== Aftermath ==
The treaty was broken almost immediately after its inception. In 1858, during the Pike's Peak Gold Rush, a mass immigration of miners and settlers into Colorado occurred. White settlers took over the treaty's established territories in order to mine them, "against the protests of the Indians." These settlers established towns, farms, and improved roadways. Before 1861, the Cheyenne and Arapaho "had been driven from the mountain regions down upon the waters of the Arkansas." Such immigrants competed with the tribes for game and water, straining limited resources and causing conflicts. The U.S. government did not enforce the treaty to keep out the immigrants. In 1864, Colonel John M. Chivington's armies perpetrated the Sand Creek massacre against a peaceful camp of mostly Cheyennes, killing and mutilating the bodies of many men, women, and children. This event led to years of war between the Cheyennes and the United States.

The situation escalated in 1854 with the Grattan affair, when a detachment of U.S. soldiers illegally entered a Sioux encampment to arrest those accused of stealing a cow, and in the process sparked a battle in which Chief Conquering Bear was killed.

Though intertribal fighting had existed before the arrival of white settlers, some of the post-treaty intertribal fighting can be attributed to targeted mass killings of bison by white settlers and government agents. The U.S. Army did not enforce treaty regulations and allowed hunters onto Native land to slaughter buffalo, providing protection and sometimes ammunition. One hundred thousand buffalo were killed each year until they were on the verge of extinction, which threatened the tribes' subsistence. These mass killings affected all tribes thus the tribes were forced onto each other's hunting grounds, where fighting broke out.

By summer 1862, all three tribes had been forced out of their shared treaty territory. "We, the Arikara, have been driven from our country on the other side of the Missouri River by the Sioux," stated chief White Shield in 1864. The elimination of buffalo also meant that the Yanktonai Sioux moved into Assiniboine hunting grounds in North Dakota and Montana, where the Assiniboine made peace with them.

Before long, the Crows saw their western Powder River area flooded with trespassing Lakotas in search of bison, and "... large scale battles with invading Sioux" took place near what is now the city of Wyola, Montana. The outnumbered Crows were displaced little by little. "The country from the Powder River to the Yellowstone River was their country [the Crows'], until 1859, when they were driven from it by the Sioux." In 1868, after a series of battles with the United States army in the contested area, the Lakotas finally succeeded in turning a part of the Crow Indian territory of 1851 into unceded Indian territory of their own.

Later again, huge parts of the different Indian territories would in one way or another be added to the holdings of the United States. Smaller areas of the initial Indian territories became separate reservations, usually populated with Indians from the tribe, which held the treaty right in 1851.

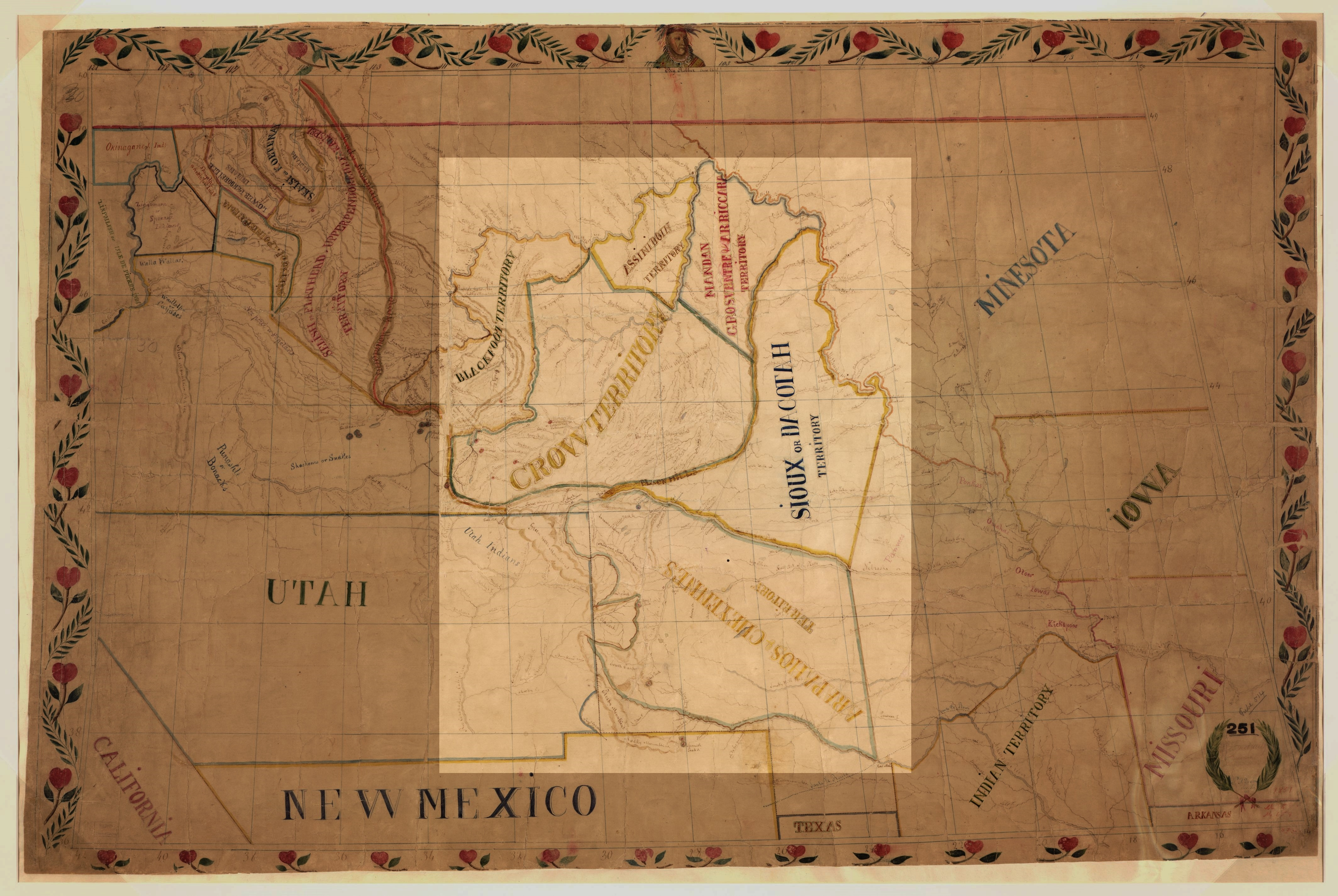
De Smet map of the 1851 Fort Laramie Indian territories (light area)

The Crow territory outlined in the treaty was split to provide land to two different reservations. The Crow Reservation was created in the center of the original territory in 1868. The reservation of the Northern Cheyennes was designated in 1884. It is located entirely within the boundaries of the 1851 Crow territory, after the Indians in question had "earned the right to stay in the north" after the Fort Robinson outbreak.

The Arapahoe (Northern Arapaho) settled down on the reservation of their past enemies, the Shoshone, in what is now Wind River Reservation, Wyoming. The Southern Cheyenne and the Arapaho live in a common reservation in what is now Oklahoma, also far from their 1851 treaty land.

The Assiniboine in the United States has since 1888 lived in Fort Peck Reservation and in Fort Belknap Reservation, both placed north of the Missouri in what is now Montana. The treaty territory of the Assiniboine south of the Missouri was just a small portion of the wide range used by these northern plains Indians.

== See also ==
- Indian Peace Commission, which negotiated the Second Treaty of Fort Laramie
