= Lucy A. Delaney =

African American writer and activist (1830–1910)

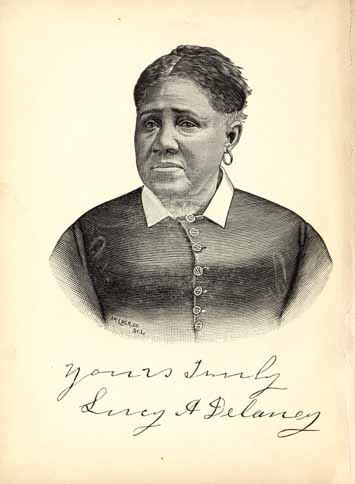
- "Yours Truly", Lucy A. Delaney, The New York Public Library Digital Collections
- Born: Lucy Ann Berry c. 1828–1830; St. Louis, Missouri, United States
- Died: August 31, 1910 (aged 79–80); Hannibal, Missouri, United States
- Resting place: Greenwood Cemetery, St. Louis, Missouri
- Occupations: Author, seamstress, community leader
- Spouses: Frederick Turner (m. 1845; died 1848); Zachariah Delaney (m. 1849; died 1891)
- Parent: Polly Berry
- Writing career
- Language: English
- Notable works: From the Darkness Cometh the Light, or, Struggles for Freedom

Lucy Delaney (née Lucy Ann Berry; c. 1828–1830 – August 31, 1910) was an African American seamstress, slave narrator, and community leader. She was born into slavery and was primarily held by the Major Taylor Berry and Judge Robert Wash families. As a teenager, she was the subject of a freedom lawsuit, because her mother lived in Illinois, a free state, longer than 90 days. According to Illinois state law, enslaved people that reside in Illinois for more than 90 days should be indentured and freed. The country's rule of partus sequitur ventrem asserts that if the mother was free at the child's birth, the child should be free. After Delaney's mother, Polly Berry (also known as Polly Wash), filed a lawsuit for herself, she filed a lawsuit on her daughter's behalf in 1842. Delaney was held in jail for 17 months while awaiting the trial.

In 1891, Delaney published the narrative, From the Darkness Cometh the Light, or, Struggles for Freedom. This is the only known first-person account of a freedom suit and one of the few slave narratives published in the post-Emancipation period. The memoir recounts her mother's legal battles in St. Louis, Missouri, for her own and her daughter's freedom from slavery. For Delaney's case, Berry attracted the support of Edward Bates, a prominent Whig politician and judge, and the future United States Attorney General under President Abraham Lincoln. He argued Delaney's case in court and won her freedom in February 1844. Delaney's and her mother's cases were two of 301 freedom suits filed in St. Louis from 1814 to 1860. The memoir provides insight into the activities of Delaney's life during and after the freedom suits. There are some discrepancies, though, between the memoir and public records regarding her mother Polly's childhood, such as where she was born and whether she was born free or not.

Delaney and her mother lived in St. Louis briefly before her first marriage in 1845 to Frederick Turner, which brought the mother and daughter to Quincy, Illinois. In 1848, Turner was killed in a steamboat explosion. The women returned to St. Louis, and in 1849, Lucy Berry married Zachariah Delaney. Lucy's mother lived with the Delaney's in the Mill Creek Valley of St. Louis. They had a comfortable middle class life and Delaney and her husband were active leaders in the St. Louis area. Delaney and her husband had at least four children, a couple of whom died in childhood and a couple of whom died in their twenties.

== Early life ==
Lucy Ann Berry was born into slavery in St. Louis, Missouri around 1828 and 1830. Her mother, Polly Berry was born a slave in Kentucky around 1803 or 1805. (Note: Delaney's memoir states that Polly was born free and a group of men took her and three other free people hostage and brought them to Missouri: “Polly, with four other colored persons, were kidnapped, and, after being securely bound and gagged, were put into a skiff and carried across the Mississippi River to the city of St. Louis." However, Naomi Wood testified for Polly's trial that she had known Polly since she was a baby and described the history of her time as an enslaved child in Kentucky with the Beattys and Crocketts. In addition, the census record of 1880 for Lucy A. Delaney states that her mother was born in Kentucky.) In October 1817, when Polly was about fourteen, she was taken to Edwardsville, Illinois. After 90 days in Illinois, slaveholders were required to register their slaves as indentured servants, which legally made them free. However, months later, in April 1818, Polly was transported to Little Dixie of central Missouri, where she was sold. She was taken up the Missouri River and lived there from 1818 to around 1823. She was then sold to Major Taylor Berry and his wife, Frances (Fannie) of Howard County, Missouri.

Delaney said of the transaction:

Major Berry was immediately attracted by the bright and alert appearance of Polly, and at once negotiated with the trader, paid the price agreed upon, and started for home to present his wife with this flesh and blood commodity, which money could so easily procure in our vaunted land of freedom. Mrs. Fanny Berry was highly pleased with Polly's manner and appearance, and concluded to make a seamstress of her.

— Lucy A. Delaney

Polly married an unnamed enslaved man of the Berry's and they had two daughters, Nancy and Lucy. They lived in Franklin County, Missouri. The major told Polly and her husband that they and his other slaves would be freed upon his death and the death of his wife. But, Berry's will did not stipulate that any slaves should be freed. After the major died in a duel, the widow Fannie Berry married Robert Wash of St. Louis, a lawyer later appointed as a justice of the Supreme Court of Missouri. Polly and her family remained enslaved and she became known as Polly Wash. Fannie died on February 6, 1829, after which Judge Wash sold Delaney's father to a plantation in the Deep South.

Delaney was reportedly very afraid of being sold and separated from her mother. Like many other enslaved mothers in Missouri, Polly encouraged her daughters to plan for the time that they could escape their slaveholders. Sinha states, "A shared belief in courageous female resistance helped mothers and daughters support heavy loads of responsibility, pain, sorrow, and loneliness."

Delaney, her mother and sister went to Taylor and Fannie Berry's daughter, Mary, who married Henry Sidney Coxe on March 21, 1837. Nancy was taken with them on their honeymoon trip, with a stop in Niagara Falls, New York. Nancy had been previously instructed by Polly to escape into Canada (where slavery had been abolished and the Fugitive Slave Act of 1793 was invalid). In Niagara Falls, Nancy received assistance from a servant at the hotel where they had been staying, and she made it safely across the border into Canada. (Note: Nancy later married a successful farmer.)

While Polly was owned by the Coxes, she periodically worked on riverboats along the Mississippi River and Illinois River. One day, Mary complained that Polly put on "white airs" and threatened to sell and subsequently did sell Polly at a slave auction in St. Louis for $550 (equivalent to $16,629 in 2025) to Joseph Magehan, a carpenter and lumberman from St. Louis. According to Delaney's memoir and some subsequent sources, Polly escaped to Chicago, was caught, and returned to St. Louis, but there is no evidence that this occurred and there was no mention of it in records of Polly's court case. (Note: There are a wide variety of opinions: According to Edlie L. Wong, after Polly learned that the Coxes intended to sell her, she fled to Chicago. She began to worry about retribution being taken out on Delaney by Henry Coxe. She was pursued (under the Fugitive Slave Act of 1793) and "gave herself up to her captors", who returned her to St. Louis.; Corbett states that Magehan had taken Polly down the Mississippi River. She escaped and walked to Chicago.; The National Park Service says in its article about Delaney that Polly went to Chicago on the Underground Railroad.; Anna K. Roberts states that she left St. Louis on a steamboat to cross the Mississippi to meet up with Naomi Woods, whom she knew from her childhood near Alton, Illinois, and the years before that in Kentucky.)

Delaney, who took care of Mary Berry and Henry Sidney Coxe's children, was subject to the parents' "fiery personalities." The couple suffered from the loss of their two infant children and Henry's alcoholism. Mary filed for divorce in 1845, citing her husband's alcoholism, severe temper, and verbal abuse. Mary withdrew the suit after Henry enumerated her faults. They agreed to stay married, but lived separately.

== Freedom suits ==
=== Polly ===
Having been held illegally as a slave in Illinois, Polly sued for her freedom in the Circuit Court in the case known as Polly Wash v. Joseph A. Magehan in October 1839. When her suit was finally heard in 1843, her attorney Harris Sproat convinced a jury that she had been in Illinois long enough to have earned her freedom. Polly was freed. She continued her efforts to secure her daughter Lucy Ann Berry's freedom, having filed a freedom suit on her behalf in 1842.

=== Lucy ===
By 1842, Delaney went to Mary's younger sister, Martha. She was believed to have been a gift to Marth upon her marriage to David D. Mitchell. Delaney was tasked with doing the laundry, a task at which she was inexperienced. Doing the laundry required carrying up to 50 gallons of water for each load, hand washing with lye, using laundry boards for each item of clothing, and wringing clothes. After that, clothes were hung on lines, starched, and ironed with heavy flat irons. Historian Tera Hunter states that it "was the single most onerous chore in the life of a nineteenth-century woman." She used water from the Missouri River, which was muddy and discolored the clothing. After Martha complained about the ruined clothing and called her lazy, Delaney replied,

You don't know nothing, yourself, about it, and you expect a poor ignorant girl to know more than you do yourself. If you had any feeling you would get somebody to teach me, and then I'd do well enough. She then gave me a wrapper to do up, and told me if I ruined it that as I did the other clothes, she would whip me severely.

— Lucy A. Delaney

After the wrapper was washed and ruined, Mary attempted to beat Delaney with tongs, a broomstick, and a shovel, all of which Delaney was able to take away from her. After Mary's husband refused to beat her, they planned to sell her into the Deep South. Before they could take her away, Delaney escaped to the cottage of her mother, who had her hide at a friend's house.

Polly filed suit on September 8, 1842, as a "next friend" of her daughter against David D. Mitchell. Since her own case had not been settled, Polly was still considered a slave with no legal standing, but under the slave law, she could file suit in Circuit Court in St. Louis for Delaney's freedom as "next friend". (Note: Delaney suggested in her memoir that Wash's attorneys proposed the strategy of filing separate suits for her and her daughter, to prevent a jury's worrying about taking too much property from one slaveholder.) According to the rule of partus sequitur ventrem, which had been adopted into United States slave law, the status of children followed that of the mother. Since Delaney was born to a woman who should have been considered free at the time, she should also have been free. A $2,000 (equivalent to $66,724 in 2025) bond was established by Judge Bryan Mullanphy, should Mitchell try to reclaim Delaney. Mitchell wanted to ensure that she was kept in St. Louis until the trial. Delaney was remanded to jail, where she was held for 17 months. (Note: It was customary to lease out slaves to offset expenses and earn money for such slaves' masters.) During that time, Delaney was fell ill sue to the poor conditions of the jail that was crowded, cold, damp, and smelled of sewage. She did not have sufficient clothing to keep her warm. She benefited from visits from her mother and the kindness of the jailor Benjamin Lacy's sister-in-law, likely Minerva Ann (Doyle) Lacy, the wife of Lewis Fernandez Lacy.

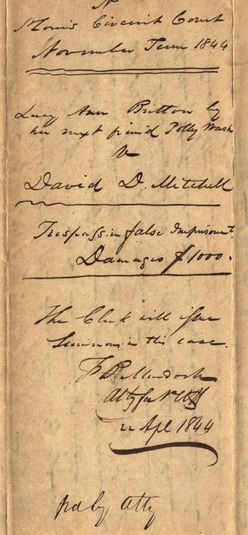
Lucy Ann Britton v. David D. Mitchell freedom suit and damages, November 1844, St Louis Circuit Court

In February 1844, the case went to trial. Francis B. Murdoch, the former district attorney for Alton, Illinois, prepared the case to free Delaney. He was highly involved in freedom suits in St. Louis. (Note: Murdoch had prosecuted the murder of Elijah Lovejoy in Alton by anti-abolitionists.) The prominent Whig politician Edward Bates, a slaveholder, argued the case in court. He was later appointed as the US Attorney General under President Abraham Lincoln.

By the time the case went to trial, her mother's case had been settled, and Polly was freed. Polly had affidavits from people who knew her and her daughter. Judge Robert Wash (Fanny Berry Wash's widower and Polly's previous master) testified that Delaney was definitely Polly's child. With the case settled by the principle of "once free, always free," Bates was able to convince the jury that her daughter should be freed. The judge announced that she was found to be free. She left the jail the day the verdict was made. Once free, Delaney would have had to register with the city of St. Louis and find someone to post bond in support of her registration.

Wash filed a second suit on behalf of her daughter entitled Lucy Ann Britton v. David D. Mitchell, (Note: Gardner speculates that "Britton" could give a clue to her father's name. Or, it could refer to the surname of "Brinton", which in some records looks like Britton in handwritten versions of the name; the Brintons were relatives of Henry Sidney Coxe. Or, it may be that someone misheard "Berry" when Polly filed the suit.) for $1,000 in damages against David D. Mitchell for false imprisonment. By this suit, Polly and Murdoch may have been trying to preclude Mitchell from appealing the court's decision, in addition to seeking reparations for poor conditions that Delaney suffered in jail. They later dropped the suit.

== Marriage and family ==
Delaney and her mother worked as seamstresses in St. Louis after they gained their freedom. In 1845, Delaney met and married steamboat worker Frederick Turner, with whom she settled in Quincy, Illinois. Her mother lived with them. Turner died soon after in a boiler explosion on the steamboat The Edward Bates on August 12, 1848.

To my mind it seemed a singular coincidence that the boat which bore the name of the great and good man, who had given me the first joy of my meagre life – the precious boon of freedom – and that his namesake should be the means of weighting me with my first great sorrow; this thought seemed to reconcile me to my grief, for that name was ever sacred, and I could not speak it without reverence.

— Lucy A. Delaney

Lucy Ann married Zachariah Delaney in St. Louis on November 16, 1849, a free black man from Cincinnati, Ohio. The Delaneys lived in a house on Gay Street in Mill Creek Valley of St. Louis. Called the Delaney House, it was built in 1845. She was a successful seamstress and her husband was a porter, cook, mail clerk, janitor, and laborer. They were members of the middle class. The Delaneys were married 42 years, until his death around 1891. Her mother lived with them. Though the couple had four children, two did not survive infancy. The remaining son and daughter both died in their early twenties. In 1870, the Delaneys had three boys and three girls living with them, from 19 to nearly a year old. By 1880, they had no children living with them.

After the Civil War, Lucy located her father outside Vicksburg, Mississippi, and with her sister from Canada, Nancy and Lucy were reunited with their father during a visit.

I frequently thought of father, and wondered if he were alive or dead; and at the time of the great exodus of negroes from the South, a few years ago, a large number arrived in St. Louis, and were cared for by the colored people of that city. They were sheltered in churches, halls and private houses, until such time as they could pursue their journey. Methought, I will find him in this motley crowd, of all ages, from the crowing babe in its mother's arms, to the aged and decrepit, on whom the marks of slavery were still visible. I piled inquiry upon inquiry, until after long and persistent search, I learned that my father had always lived on the same plantation, fifteen miles from Vicksburg. I wrote to my father and begged him to come and see me and make his home with me; sent him the money, so he would be to no expense, and when he finally reached St. Louis, it was with great joy that I received him. Old, grizzled and gray, time had dealt hardly with him, and he looked very little like the dapper master's valet, whose dark beauty won my mother's heart.

— Lucy A. Delaney

== Civic engagement ==
She was active in women's clubs, religious organizations and charity groups. Such organizations developed rapidly in both the African-American and white communities nationally in the years following the Civil War. She joined the African Methodist Episcopal Church in 1855, founded in 1816 in Philadelphia as the first independent black denomination in the United States. Delaney was elected president of the first colored society, the Female Union, an organization of African-American women. She also served as president of the Daughters of Zion, as well as the Free Union, the first society for African American women. She was a leader in the black women's Masonic movement.

Delaney was secretary to a black veteran's group after the Civil War. She belonged to the Col. Shaw Woman's Relief Corps, No. 34, a women's auxiliary to the Col. Shaw Post, 343, Grand Army of the Republic (GAR). The veterans' group was named after the white commanding officer of the 54th Massachusetts Infantry, the first of the United States Colored Troops and a unit that achieved renown for courage in the Civil War. Delaney dedicated her memoir to the GAR, which had fought for the freedom of enslaved people.

== Memoir ==
In 1891, Delaney published her From the Darkness Cometh the Light, or, Struggles for Freedom, the only first-person account of a freedom suit. The text is also classified as a slave narrative, most of which were published prior to the Civil War and Emancipation. The book accomplishes the following:

Polly releases motherhood from its ties to 'pure womanhood's' fragility, realigning nurture with liberation. Hardly feminine genuflection, Polly's triumph in male-dominated courts is matched by her daughter's refusal to be whipped. Darkness culminates in Delaney's perpetuating her dead mother's legacy of freedom in her election to numerous civic posts, including the presidency of the 'Female Union'—the first society for African American women—and of the Daughters of Zion.

— Deborah Garfield, The Concise Oxford Companion to African American Literature

== Death and legacy ==
She died at the Negro Masonic Home, purchased by the Freemasons for aged members and widows in 1907, in Hannibal, Missouri, on August 31, 1910. Funeral services were held for her at the St. James African Methodist Episcopal Church in St. Louis, sponsored by the Heroines of Jericho. She was buried in Greenwood Cemetery in St. Louis.

The city of St. Louis has frequently acknowledged Lucy Ann Berry's significance to local and national Black History.

== See also ==
- Charlotte Dupuy
- Dred Scott
- Marguerite Scypion
- List of slaves

== Bibliography ==
- Delaney, Lucy A. (1891). From the Darkness Cometh the Light or Struggles for Freedom. St. Louis: J. T. Smith.
- Gardner, Eric (2010). Unexpected Places: Relocating Nineteenth-Century African American Literature. University Press of Mississippi. ISBN 978-1604732849.
- Katz, William Loren (1999). Black pioneers : an untold story. New York: Atheneum Books. ISBN 978-0689814105.
- Roberts, Anna K. (October 2018). "Crossing Jordon: The Mississippi River in the Black Experience in Greater St. Louis, 1815–1860". Missouri Historical Review. 113 (1). The State Historical Society of Missouri.
- Van Ravenswaay, Charles (1991). St. Louis: An Informal History of the City and Its People, 1764–1865. St. Louis, MO: Missouri History Museum. ISBN 978-0252019159.
- VanderVelde, Lea (2014). Redemption songs : suing for freedom before Dred Scott. Oxford & New York: Oxford University Press. p. 146. ISBN 978-0199927296.
- Wong, Edlie L. (2009). Neither Fugitive nor Free: Atlantic Slavery, Freedom Suits, and the Legal Culture of Travel. New York University Press. ISBN 978-0814794654.
