= Edward Bates =

American politician, lawyer and judge (1793–1869)

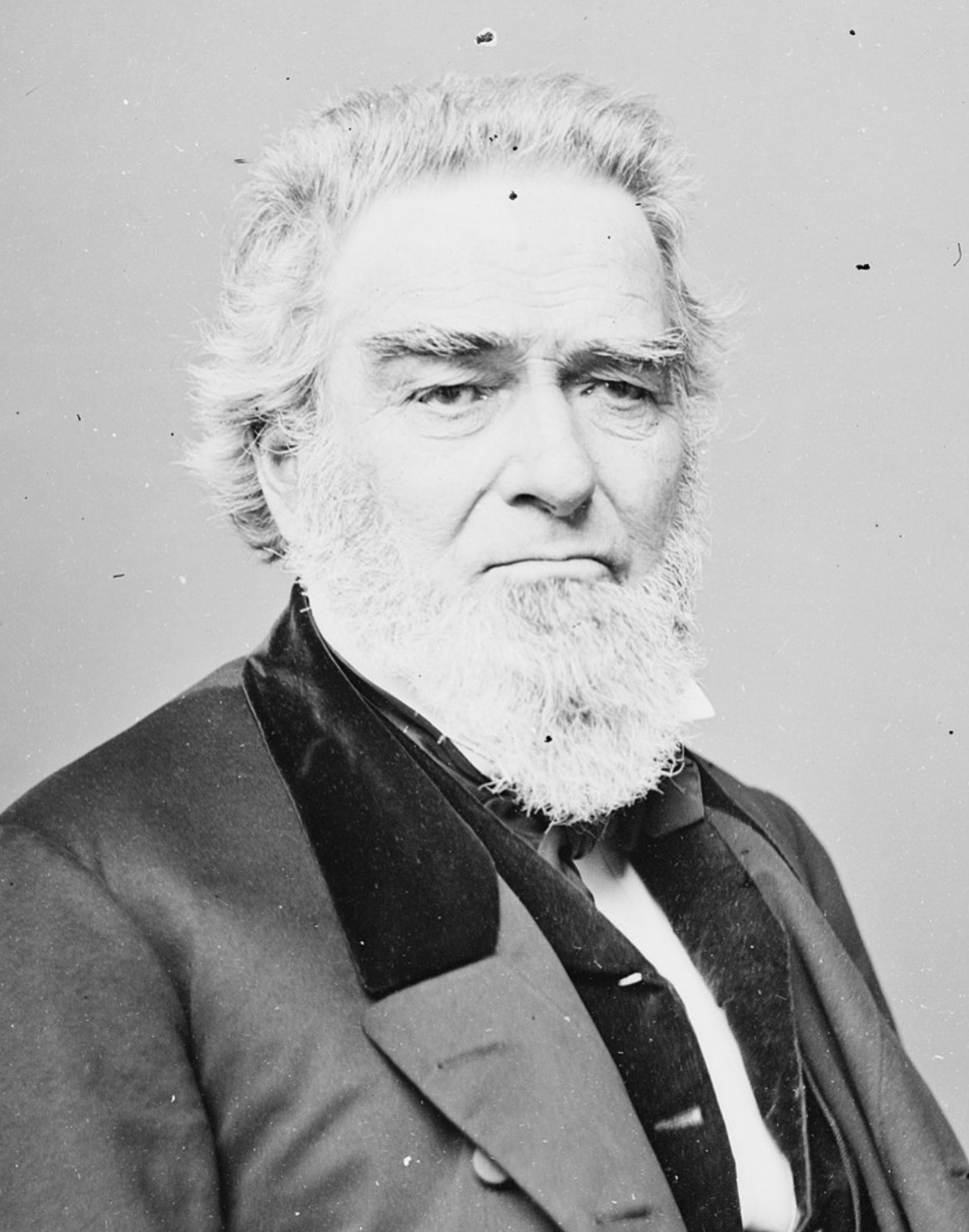
- Portrait by Mathew Brady c. 1855–1865

26th United States Attorney General
- In office March 5, 1861 – November 24, 1864
- President: Abraham Lincoln
- Preceded by: Edwin Stanton
- Succeeded by: James Speed

Member of the Missouri House of Representatives
- In office 1835–1836

Member of the Missouri Senate
- In office 1831–1835

Member of the U.S. House of Representatives from Missouri's at-large district
- In office March 4, 1827 – March 3, 1829
- Preceded by: John Scott
- Succeeded by: Spencer Darwin Pettis

Member of the Missouri House of Representatives
- In office 1822–1823

1st Attorney General of Missouri
- In office September 18, 1820 – November 8, 1821
- Governor: Alexander McNair
- Preceded by: Position established
- Succeeded by: Rufus Easton

Personal details
- Born: September 4, 1793 Goochland County, Virginia, U.S.
- Died: March 25, 1869 (aged 75) St. Louis, Missouri, U.S.
- Resting place: Bellefontaine Cemetery
- Party: Democratic-Republican (Before 1825); National Republican (1825–1834); Whig (1834–1854); American (1854–1860); Republican (1860–1869)
- Relatives: Bates family

Military service
- Branch/service: United States Army
- Rank: Sergeant
- Unit: United States Volunteers
- Battles/wars: War of 1812

Edward Bates (September 4, 1793 – March 25, 1869) was an American lawyer, politician and judge. He represented Missouri in the US House of Representatives and served as the U.S. Attorney General under President Abraham Lincoln. A member of the influential Bates family, he was the first US Cabinet appointee from a state west of the Mississippi River.

Born in Goochland County, Virginia, in 1793, Bates moved to St. Louis, where he established a legal practice. He was appointed as the first attorney general of the state of Missouri in 1820. Over the next 30 years, he won election to a single term in Congress and served in both the Missouri House of Representatives and the Missouri Senate, becoming a prominent member of the Whig Party. He also represented Lucy Delaney in a successful freedom suit.

After the breakup of the Whig Party in the early 1850s, he briefly joined the American Party before he became a member of the Republican Party. He was a candidate for president at the 1860 Republican National Convention, but Lincoln won the party's nomination. Bates was appointed as attorney general in 1861, at the start of the American Civil War. He successfully carried out some of the administration's early war policies, but he disagreed with Lincoln on the issue of the Emancipation Proclamation. He did not support full civil and political equality for Blacks. Bates resigned from the Cabinet in 1864 after he had been passed over for a US Supreme Court appointment. After leaving office, he unsuccessfully opposed the adoption of a new state constitution in Missouri.

== Early life ==
Bates was born in Goochland County, Virginia, to Thomas Fleming Bates and his wife, the former Caroline Matilda Woodson (1749–1845). His father was a Goochland County native, having been born on his family's Belmont plantation, and served in the local militia, including at the Siege of Yorktown at the end of the American Revolutionary War. Like his siblings and others of the planter class, Bates was tutored at home as a boy. When older, he attended Charlotte Hall Military Academy in Maryland.

== Career ==
Edward Bates served in the War of 1812 before moving to St. Louis, Missouri Territory, in 1814 with his older brother James, who started working as an attorney. Their eldest brother Frederick Bates was already in St. Louis by that time, where he had served as Secretary of the Louisiana Territory and Secretary of the Missouri Territory.

Edward Bates studied the law with Rufus Easton and boarded with his family. Easton was Judge of the Louisiana Territory, the largest jurisdiction in U.S. history since the Louisiana Purchase. After being admitted to the bar, Bates worked as a partner with Easton.

In 1817, the two organized the James Ferry, which ran from St. Charles, Missouri to Alton, Illinois. Easton had founded the latter town, naming it after his first son Alton.

Bates's private practice partner was Joshua Barton, who was appointed as the first Missouri Secretary of State. Barton became infamous for fighting duels on Bloody Island. In 1816 Bates was the second to Barton in a duel with Thomas Hempstead, brother of Edward Hempstead, the Missouri Territory's first Congressional representative. The fight ended without bloodshed. Barton was killed in a duel on the island in 1823.

Bates's first foray into politics came in 1820, with election as a member of the state's constitutional convention. He wrote the preamble to the state constitution. He was appointed as the new state's Attorney General.

In 1822, Bates was elected to the Missouri House of Representatives. He was elected to the United States House of Representatives for a single term (1827–1829). Next, he was elected to the State Senate from 1831 to 1835, then to the Missouri House from 1835. He ran for the U.S. Senate, but lost to Democrat Thomas Hart Benton.

Bates became a prominent member of the Whig Party during the 1840s, where his political philosophy closely resembled that of Henry Clay. While a slaveholder, during this time Bates became interested in the freedom suit of Polly Berry, an enslaved woman who in 1843 gained her freedom decades after having been held illegally for several months in the free state of Illinois. After she gained her freedom, Berry enlisted Bates's support as her attorney in the separate freedom suit she filed for her daughter Lucy Ann Berry, then about age 14. According to the principle of partus sequitur ventrem, since the mother had been proved a free woman at the time of her daughter's birth, the court ruled that Lucy was also legally free. During this time, Orion Clemens, brother of Mark Twain, studied law under Bates.

While Bates is considered by some modern scholars as "generally unsympathetic to the cause of African American freedom," he emancipated all of his slaves and had paid for his last former slave's passage to Liberia by 1851.

In 1850, President Millard Fillmore asked Bates to serve as U.S. Secretary of War, but he declined. Charles Magill Conrad accepted the position. At the Whig National Convention in 1852, Bates was considered for nomination as vice president on the party ticket, and he led on the first ballot before losing on the second ballot to William Alexander Graham. After the breakup of the Whig Party in the 1850s, Bates briefly joined the Know-Nothing Party but then joined the Republican Party.

== Attorney General ==
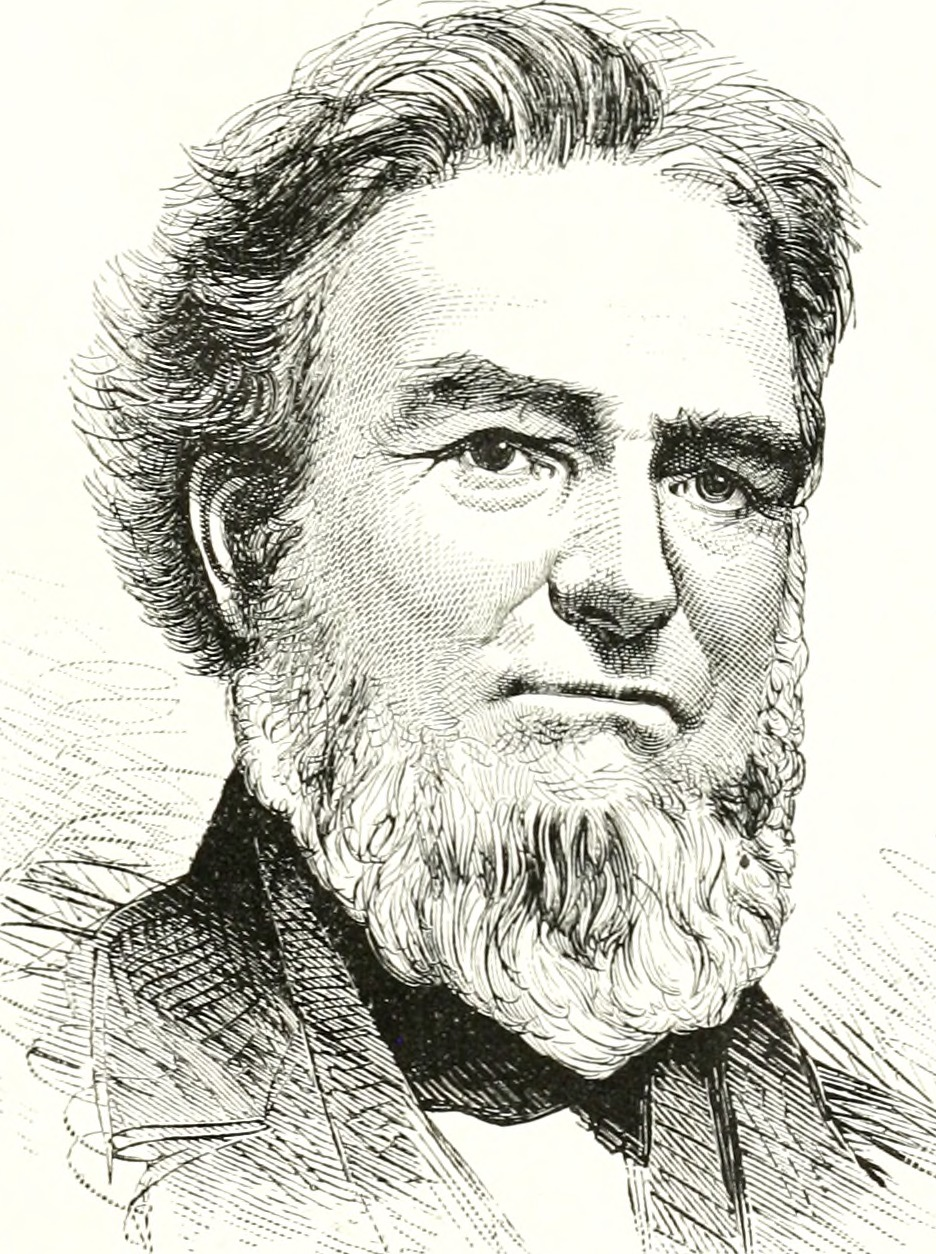
Bates as a candidate for President, published in Harper's Weekly, 1860

Bates was one of the four main candidates for the Republican Party's 1860 presidential nomination. Bates initially received support from Horace Greeley, who later switched to support Abraham Lincoln. Republicans rejected Bates as a nominee due to his weak anti-slavery credentials and his earlier support of the Know-Nothings. The next year, after winning the election, Lincoln appointed Bates United States Attorney General, an office Bates held from 1861 until 1864. Bates was the first Cabinet member to be appointed from a state or territory west of the Mississippi River.

There was no Justice Department until 1870. Bates had only a small operation, with a staff of six. The main function was to generate legal opinions at the request of Lincoln and cabinet members, and handle occasional cases before the Supreme Court. The cabinet was full of experienced lawyers who seldom felt the need to ask for his opinions. Bates had no authority over the US Attorneys around the country. The federal court system was handled by the Interior Department; the Treasury handled claims. Most of the opinions turned out by Bates's office were of minor importance. Lincoln gave him no special assignments and did not seek his advice on Supreme Court appointments. Bates did have a voice on general policy as a cabinet member with a strong political base, but he seldom spoke out. At age 68 he was the oldest high-level Lincoln appointee, and from late 1863 was in poor health.

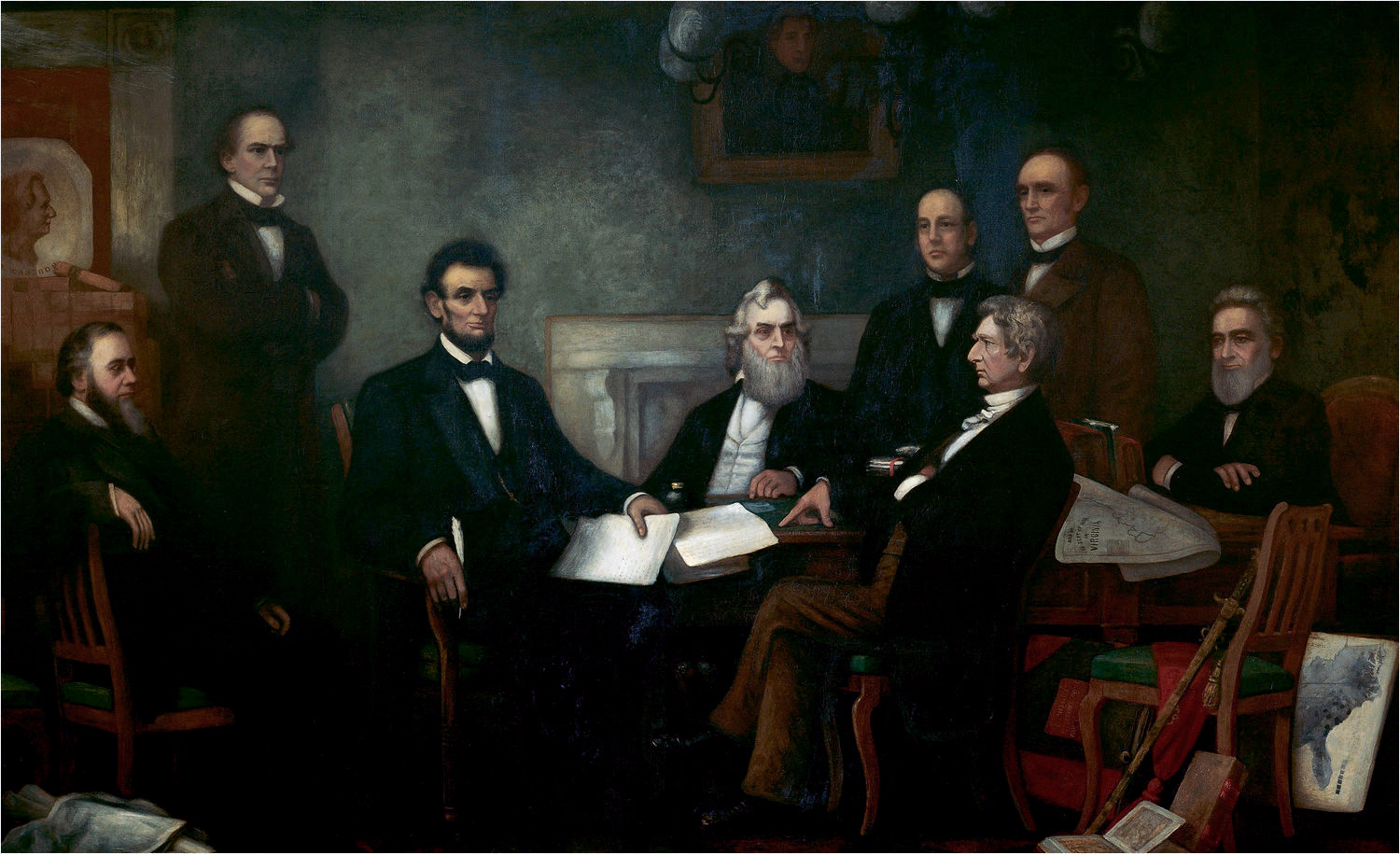
First Reading of the Emancipation Proclamation of President Lincoln by Francis Bicknell Carpenter (1864) (Clickable image—use cursor to identify.)

One key Bates decision involved the question of Black citizenship. In the summer of 1862, a ship sailing out of New Jersey had been detained by customs because its captain was African American. Ship captains were required to be US citizens, and according to the Dred Scott decision Black Americans were not considered citizens. In an opinion published in mid-December, Bates recognized free African Americans as citizens of the United States, contradicting Dred Scott v. Sandford. When pressed for clarification by Robert Charles Winthrop, Bates confirmed that citizenship rights were the same regardless of race, and that state laws limiting free Black migration and settlement were unconstitutional.

Bates's tenure as Attorney General generally met with mixed reviews. On the one hand, he was important in carrying out some of Lincoln's earlier war policies, including the arbitrary arrest of southern sympathizers and seditious northerners. On the other hand, as Lincoln's policies became more radical, Bates became increasingly irrelevant. Bates disagreed with Lincoln on emancipation and the recruitment of blacks into the Union Army. In 1864, Lincoln nominated Salmon P. Chase to be Chief Justice, an office Bates had wanted. Bates then resigned and was succeeded by James Speed, a Kentucky lawyer with Radical Republican views.

== Later years ==
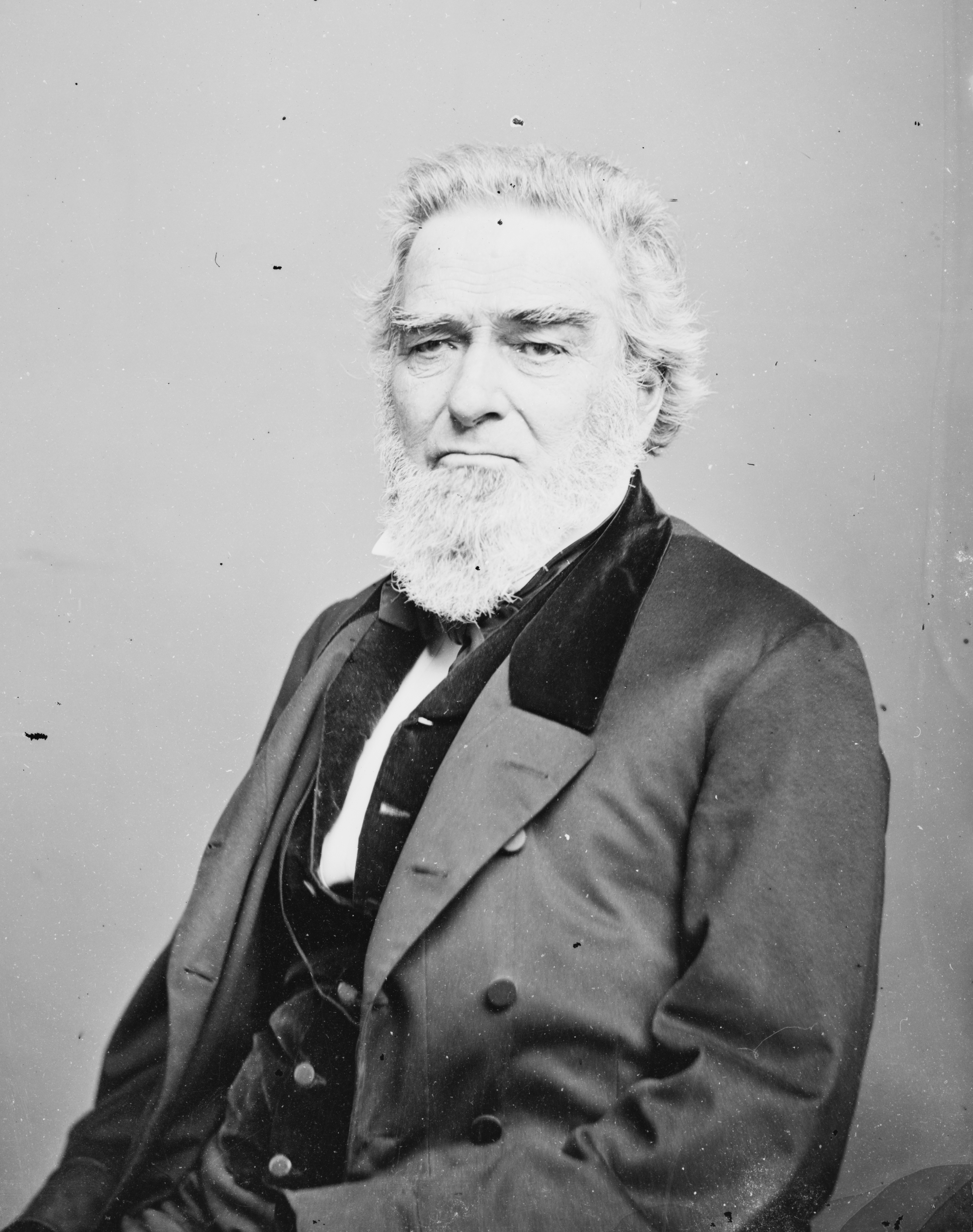
Portrait of Bates later in life by Mathew Brady

Bates returned to Missouri after leaving the cabinet. He participated in the conservative struggle over ordinances related to the Missouri constitution of 1865. Bates particularly objected to the "ironclad oath" that was required as a proof of loyalty by residents. He also disapproved of the temporary disfranchisement of rebel sympathizers. He wrote seven essays arguing against the constitution, but it was ratified. It abolished slavery in the state, passed three weeks before the US Congress proposed the Thirteenth Amendment to abolish slavery in the US.

Bates retired from politics, although he commented on political events in the local newspapers. He died in St. Louis in 1869 and was buried at Bellefontaine Cemetery.

== Personal life ==
Bates married Julia Coalter from South Carolina. They had 17 children together. She had come to St. Louis to visit her brother David Coalter and her sister Caroline J. Coalter. Her sister Caroline married Hamilton R. Gamble (another attorney and Unionist), who ultimately became chief justice of the Missouri Supreme Court.

Bates was, for the most part, happy with his large family. His four sons had various roles during the Civil War. His oldest son, Barton Bates, served on the Supreme Court of Missouri during the war. Son John C. Bates served in the US Army and later became Army Chief of Staff. Son Fleming Bates fought with the Confederates, under the command of General Sterling Price. This caused tension between the father and this son, and Bates rarely mentioned Fleming in his war-time diary. The youngest son, Charles, was still attending West Point during the war.

== In popular culture ==
Bates is portrayed by John Billingsley in the Apple TV miniseries Manhunt — an anachronism, since the story takes place in 1865 when Bates was no longer attorney general.

== See also ==
- Polly Berry, formerly enslaved woman who hired Bates to represent her in her daughter's freedom suit (1844)
- Lucy Berry, enslaved 14-year-old girl who gained freedom in a suit filed by her mother Polly Berry and argued by Bates

== Sources ==
- Foner, Eric. 1970. Free Soil, Free Labor, Free Men: The Ideology of the Republican Party Before the Civil War. Oxford University Press, London, New York. ISBN 0-19-501352-2

Legal offices
Preceded by (none)	Missouri State Attorney General; 1820–1821	Succeeded by Rufus Easton
Preceded by Edwin M. Stanton	U.S. Attorney General; Served under: Abraham Lincoln; March 5, 1861 – November 24, 1864	Succeeded by James Speed
U.S. House of Representatives
Preceded by John Scott	Member of the U.S. House of Representatives from Missouri's at-large congressional district March 4, 1827 – March 3, 1829	Succeeded by Spencer D. Pettis
