= Polly Berry =

Plaintiff in St. Louis freedom suits

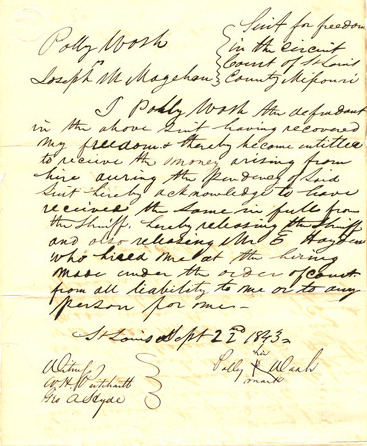
- "I, Polly Wash...having recovered my freedom..." (1843)
- Born: Polly Beatty
- Other names: Based upon her slaveholder's surnames: Polly Crockett, Polly Berry, and Polly Wash
- Occupations: Domestic servant, laundress, seamstress
- Known for: Freedom suit Polly Wash v. Joseph M. Magehan
- Children: Nancy Berry, Lucy A. Berry Delaney

Polly Berry (c.1803–1805 – after 1865) was an African American woman notable for winning two freedom suits in St. Louis, one for herself, which she won in 1843, and one for her daughter Lucy, which she won in 1844. Having acquired the surnames of her slaveholders, she was also known as Polly Crockett and Polly Wash, the latter of which was the name used in her freedom suit.

Polly was born into slavery in Kentucky, first held by the Beatty family. She was separated from her mother when she was seven or eight years of age, when she was sold to Joseph Crockett. In October 1817, the Crocketts moved to Illinois, taking Polly with them. While in Illinois, she worked in exchange for lodging for the Crockett family, corn for their livestock, and $2 a day in wages. According to state law, enslaved people were freed after residing in the state for more than 90 days. In April 1818, Crockett had Polly taken to Missouri, where she was sold. She was with different owners over a five-year period, and then sold to Major Taylor Berry. After his death, she was owned by Taylor's wife, Fannie, and upon her death she was held as an enslaved woman by Judge Robert Wash. She was with the Berry and Wash families for 12 or 13 years. During that time, she was married to one of the Berry's enslaved men. They had two daughters, Nancy and Lucy. Robert Wash sold her husband to someone in the Deep South, separating Polly and her husband for the rest of their lives.

Polly sought freedom for herself and her daughters. Her daughter Nancy escaped to Canada. She sued for her own freedom based on having been held illegally as a child slave in the free state of Illinois. In 1842, Polly sued for the freedom of her daughter Lucy Ann Berry, as the girl had legally been born to a free woman. That case was argued by Edward Bates, the future United States Attorney General under President Abraham Lincoln.

Wash was declared a free woman of color and received a freedom bond on September 26, 1843 and was allowed to reside in the state of Missouri. In a separate, but related suit, Lucy was freed. The mother and daughter worked together as seamstresses and lived together with Lucy's husband of 42 years.

Polly's life is known through the records of her freedom suit and her daughter Lucy Delaney's memoir, From the Darkness Cometh the Light, or, Struggles for Freedom (1891), which give different accounts of Polly's life before Lucy was born.

== Early life ==
Polly Wash was born a slave of the Beatty family of Wayne County, Kentucky around 1803 or 1805. (Note: Corbett states that she was born around 1806 or 1807. Lucy states in her memoir From the Darkness Cometh the Light, or, Struggles for Freedom, which was then picked up by other authors, that her mother Polly was born in Illinois. During Polly's freedom trial, Naomi Woods testified that she knew Polly since she was a baby, born into slavery, in Kentucky. In addition, census record of 1880 indicate that Lucy A. Delaney's mother was born in Kentucky.) She was with her mother until she was seven or eight, when she was sold to Joseph Crockett of the same county. (Note: Joseph Crockett was the nephew of Davy Crockett.) Crockett's son-in-law was David Beatty, who may have been Polly's slaveholder. Shortly after her purchase, the Crocketts settled in an area near the Kentucky and Tennessee border, where Crockett ran grist and saw mills and was a farmer.

In October 1817, when she was about fourteen, Crockett moved Polly and his family about four miles from Edwardsville, Illinois. The Crocketts lived in a cabin near two other families, the John Woods and the Andrew Poseys, who all knew each other in Kentucky. Polly lived with the Poseys. Known at that time as Polly Crockett, she was hired out as a domestic worker and spinner to their neighbors for $2 per week and in exchange for corn to feed their livestock and the use of a cabin for the Crocketts.

Illinois, a free state, held that slaveholders who brought slaves into the state for extended periods forfeited their rights to their "property." After 90 days in the state, slaveholders were required to register their slaves as indentured servants, which legally made them free. Concerned that Polly might be entitled to her freedom, Crockett's son, William, pressed him to continue on his journey to Missouri. At his father-in-law's request, David Beatty accompanied William on the trip to sell Polly in Little Dixie of central Missouri in April 1818. She was taken up the Missouri River and lived there, within the slave state of Missouri, from 1818 to around 1823. (Note: Her daughter Lucy's memoir states that Polly was born free and a group of men took her and three other free people hostage and brought them to Missouri: “Polly, with four other colored persons, were kidnapped, and, after being securely bound and gagged, were put into a skiff and carried across the Mississippi River to the city of St. Louis." However, Naomi Wood testified for Polly's trial that she had known Polly since she was a baby and described the history of her time with the Beattys and Crocketts.) During the five-year period, Polly was purchased by a farmer, Thomas Botts, with whom she stayed for a year. In debt, he sold all of his property, including his slaves.

== The Berry and Wash households ==
Around 1823, Polly was sold to a Major Taylor Berry in St. Louis, Missouri and was then known as Polly Berry. She worked as a domestic servant, laundress, seamstress, and nursemaid.

Major Berry was a land speculator. In 1824, Berry was tried and acquitted for charges of forgery and perjury by Abiel Leonard, the prosecuting attorney for the First Judicial District of Missouri in Howard County. Embarrassed by the trial, Berry used a rawhide whip to assault Leonard, who challenged him to a duel. On September 1, 1824, Berry was shot in the lung and three weeks later died of pneumonia. By June 3, 1826, his widow, Frances (Fannie) Christy Berry married Robert Wash, one of three Supreme Court of Missouri justices. Polly was then known as Polly Wash. Polly, Lucy, and Nancy moved to Wash Mansion. Frances traveled to Pensacola, Florida for her health and died there by February 6, 1829.

Polly was enslaved by the Berry and Wash families for 12 or 13 years. During that time, she was married to a slave, said to be a mulatto, and had two daughters, Lucy Ann and Nancy. Lucy was born about 1830. While Polly was with Robert Wash, he had hired Polly out in Illinois, up the Illinois River, for five weeks or more. Wash received $15 a month for her wages. (Note: Gardner states that while with Wash she worked on steamboats along the Mississippi River.)

According to Lucy, she and her family were to be set free, according to Taylor Berry's will. But, Berry's will does not mention freeing any slaves. Fannie's widower Robert Wash sold Polly's husband to a plantation in the Deep South. At some point, Polly, Lucy, and Nancy went to Taylor and Fannie Berry's daughter, Mary. Lucy was hired out for a time to a Mrs. Underhill.

== Flight ==
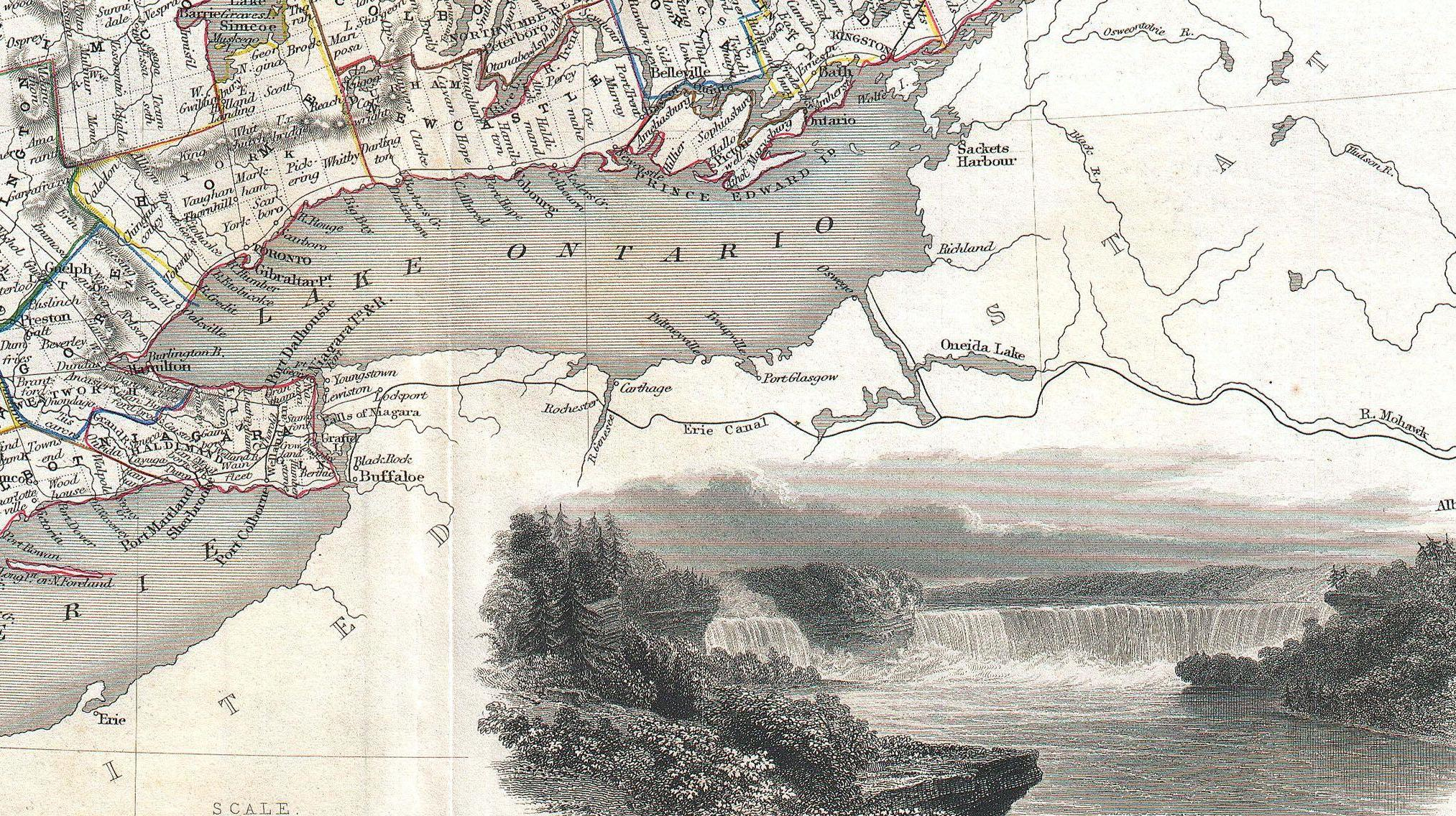
Nancy left Niagara Falls on southwestern Lake Ontario and ultimately settled in Toronto, which is due north of Niagara Falls. She may have been assisted by one of the Underground Railroad sites in Ontario, Canada, such as the British Methodist Episcopal Church, Salem Chapel, in nearby St. Catharines

Committed to pulling her daughters out of slavery, Polly prepared her daughters for escape. Mary Berry was married to Henry Sidney Coxe on March 21, 1837, and Nancy was taken with them on their honeymoon trip, with a stop in Niagara Falls, New York. Nancy, instructed by Polly to escape into Canada (where slavery was abolished), received guidance from a servant at their hotel and made it safely across the border and into Canada. (Note: Nancy later married a successful farmer.) Polly was owned by the Coxes. She worked on the riverboat The Banner along the Mississippi River, during which there were stops in Illinois and Missouri. She was also said to have worked as a chambermaid on a steamboat that traveled along the Illinois River.

As the result of an argument, the Coxes decided to sell Polly at a slave auction on Main Street of St. Louis. She was sold to Joseph Magehan, a carpenter and lumberman from St. Louis. According to Lucy, Polly escaped to Chicago, was caught, and returned to St. Louis. (Note: There is no evidence that this occurred and there was no mention of it in records of Polly's court case, but there are several accounts of her escape. According to Wong, after Polly learned that the Coxes intended to sell her, she fled to Chicago. She began to worry about retribution being taken out on Lucy by Henry Coxe. She was pursued (under the Fugitive Slave Act of 1793) and "gave herself up to her captors", who returned her to St. Louis. Corbett states that Magehan had taken Polly down the Mississippi River and she escaped and walked to Chicago.) Polly claimed that Magehan assaulted her on September 30, 1839, after which she filed her freedom suit.

Lucy remained a slave of Mary Berry and Henry Sidney Coxe, both of whom had "fiery personalities". (Note: The couple suffered from the loss of their two infant children and Henry's alcoholism. Mary filed for divorce in 1845, citing her husband's drinking habit, severe temper, and abusive language. Mary withdrew the suit after Henry enumerated her faults. They agreed to stay married, but lived separately.) She took care of their children. Lucy went to Mary's younger sister, Martha, around the time that Polly filed her freedom suit. She was believed to have been a wedding present when Martha married David D. Mitchell, who was a regional Superintendent for Indian Affairs. Lucy was a domestic servant, tasked with doing the laundry. (Note: Doing the laundry required carrying up to 50 gallons of water for each load, hand washing with lye, use of laundry boards for each item of clothing, and wringing clothes. After that, clothes were hung on lines and then starched and ironed with heavy flat irons. Historian Tera Hunter states that it "was the single most onerous chore in the life of a nineteenth-century woman.") She used water from the Missouri River, which was muddy and often ruined the clothing. As a result, Martha attempted to physically abuse her, and Lucy resisted. After being threatened to be sold in the Deep South, Lucy escaped to the cottage of her mother, who had her hide at a friend's house.

== Freedom suits ==
In 1824, Missouri passed a law that allowed for people to sue for their freedom.

=== Polly Wash ===
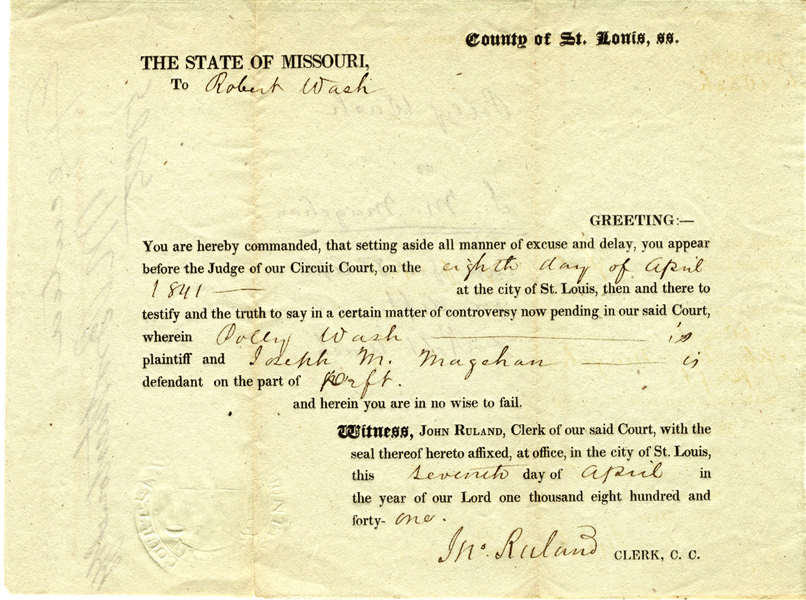
St. Louis Circuit Court Summons for Robert Wash in the case Polly Wash v. Joseph M. Magehan

Polly filed a freedom suit in the St. Louis Circuit Court on October 3, 1839, on the basis that, as a child, she had been illegally held as a slave in the free state of Illinois (Polly Wash v. Joseph M. Magehan). Her attorney was Harris Sprout.

She sued Magehan for freedom and $500 in damages to pay for her time as a slave in the free state of Illinois. She was hired out as a laundress. This had happened due to a request by Magehan, which Judge Luke Lawless ordered on January 20, 1840. She was hired out to Elijah Haydon (also spelled Hayden), a schoolmaster and reformer from Alton, Illinois who had settled in St. Louis. If she lost the suit, Magehan and the state of Missouri would be compensated with her wages. Haydon allowed her freedom to move throughout St. Louis, and in April 1840 to Illinois, where Polly communicated with possible witnesses while the case languished in the Missouri courts. In court, the witnesses noted that she had been in Illinois for an extended period of time, during which Crockett was aware of the law that would free her and he also promised to free her.

Four years after filing the suit, in the St. Louis Circuit Court, Polly Wash won her liberty and a single dollar in damages. By law, a slave's residence in a free state conferred freedom. According to the doctrine "once free, always free," that liberty was permanent.

On June 6, 1843, Polly Wash was declared a free woman by an all-white jury, on the basis of witnesses who testified she had been held as a slave in Illinois for months. This precedent of "once free, always free" had been set in the 1824 Missouri case of Winny v. Whitesides. Polly had asked for $500 (~$14,659 in 2025) in damages. The court awarded her one dollar. She was issued a freedom bond on September 26, 1843.

=== Lucy Ann Delaney ===
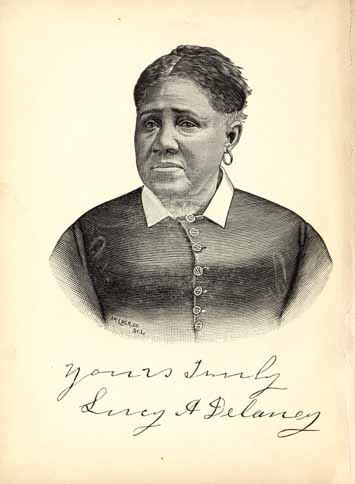
Lucy A. Delaney as a grown woman, taken by 1891

Polly filed suit on September 8, 1842, as a "next friend" of her daughter against David D. Mitchell. Her own case had not yet been tried, and as a slave she had no individual legal standing, but the law allowed her to file a suit on behalf of her minor daughter. According to the rule of partus sequitur ventrem, which had been adopted into US slave law, the status of children followed that of the mother. Since Lucy was born to a woman considered free at the time in Illinois, she should also have been free. A $2,000 (equivalent to $66,724 in 2025) bond was established by Judge Bryan Mullanphy, should Mitchell try to reclaim Lucy. Mitchell wanted to ensure that Lucy was kept in St. Louis until the trial. Lucy was remanded to jail, where she was held for 17 months. (Note: Lucy suggested in her memoir that Wash's attorneys proposed the strategy of filing separate suits for her and her daughter, to prevent a jury's worrying about taking too much property from one slaveholder.) Lucy's case was not heard until February 7 and 8, 1844, and until that time, Lucy was ill from the poor conditions of the jail that was crowded, cold, damp, and smelled of sewage. She did not have sufficient clothing for the conditions. Lucy benefited from visits from her mother and the kindness of the jailor Benjamin Lacy's sister-in-law, likely Minerva Ann (Doyle) Lacy, the wife of Lewis Fernandez Lacy. Francis B. Murdoch, the former district attorney for Alton, Illinois, prepared the case to free Lucy. He was highly involved in freedom suits in St. Louis. (Note: Murdoch had prosecuted the murder of Elijah Lovejoy in Alton by anti-abolitionists.)

The prominent Whig politician Edward Bates, a slaveholder, argued the case in court. He was later appointed as the US Attorney General under President Abraham Lincoln. With the case settled by the principle of "once free, always free," Bates was able to convince the jury that her daughter Lucy should be freed. She left the jail the day the verdict was made. Once free, Lucy would have had to register with the city of St. Louis and find someone to post bond in support of her registration.

Wash filed a second suit on behalf of her daughter, for $1,000 in damages against David D. Mitchell for false imprisonment. By this suit, Polly and Murdoch may have been trying to preclude Mitchell from appealing the court's decision, in addition to seeking reparations for poor conditions that Lucy suffered in jail. They later dropped the suit without trial.

== Freedom ==
Polly lived with her daughter Lucy Ann for the rest of her life. (Note: The older woman living with Lucy and Zachariah Delaney was Mary Williams. She was born about 1805 in Kentucky.) They worked together as seamstresses. (Note: VanderVelde states that Polly was a laundress and Lucy was a seamstress, having acquired the skill when she was jailed.) They made a comfortable living and were able to travel to Canada to visit Nancy. Polly visited her daughter Nancy and grandchildren in Toronto in 1845, and the younger woman offered to settle her there. Berry chose to return to Lucy Ann and her familiar St. Louis roots.

Lucy married Frederick Turner, but soon after he died in a steamboat explosion. She then was married in St. Louis to Zachariah Delaney. Four of their children died in their youth. The Delaneys were married for 42 years.

Polly died after the Civil War, without seeing her husband again. Lucy located her father near Vicksburg, Mississippi, and Lucy, Nancy, and their father reunited for a visit in St. Louis.

More than 45 years after attaining her freedom, after a life of civic activism, in 1891, Lucy published her memoir From the Darkness Cometh the Light, or, Struggles for Freedom. It was the only first-person account of a freedom suit.

== See also ==
- Elizabeth Key Grinstead
- Marguerite Scypion
- Charlotte Dupuy
- Dred Scott
- List of slaves

== Bibliography ==
- Delaney, Lucy A. (1890). From the Darkness Cometh the Light or Struggles for Freedom. St. Louis: J. T. Smith.
- Gardner, Eric (2010). Unexpected Places: Relocating Nineteenth-Century African American Literature. University Press of Mississippi. ISBN 978-1604732849.
- Katz, William Loren (1999). Black pioneers : an untold story. New York: Atheneum Books. ISBN 978-0689814105.
- VanderVelde, Lea (2014). Redemption songs : suing for freedom before Dred Scott. Oxford & New York: Oxford University Press. p. 146. ISBN 978-0199927296.
- Wong, Edlie L. (2009). Neither Fugitive nor Free: Atlantic Slavery, Freedom Suits, and the Legal Culture of Travel. New York University Press. ISBN 978-0814794654.
