= Eugene Field House (St. Louis) =

- U.S. National Register of Historic Places
- St. Louis Landmark
- Location within St. Louis Location within Missouri Location within the United States
- Coordinates: 38°37′12″N 90°11′31″W
- Built: 1845
- Architectural style: Federal
- NRHP reference No.: 75002137

Significant dates
- Added to NRHP: August 19, 1975
- Designated {{{NRHP_TYPE}}}: March 29, 2007

The Eugene Field House is a historic house museum in St. Louis, Missouri. Built in 1845, it was the home of Roswell Field, an attorney for Dred Scott in the landmark Dred Scott v. Sandford court case. Field's son, Eugene Field, was raised there and became a noted writer of children's stories. A National Historic Landmark, it is now a museum known as the Field House Museum. (Previously known as The Eugene Field House & St. Louis Toy Museum.)

== Description ==
The Field House is located just south of Downtown St. Louis, at the northeast corner of South Broadway and Cerre Street. It is largely surrounded by parking lots, with Interstate 64 a short way to the north. It is a three-story brick building, three bays wide, with a side gable roof whose end wall sections are raised. The entrance is in the leftmost bay, in a paneled recess. The windows have stone sills and lintels.

== History ==
The house was built in 1845, and was once part of a row of similar buildings called Walsh's Row. Most of these were torn down in the 20th century. Threatened with demolition, the house was transferred to the St. Louis Board of Education in 1936. Restored with funding from local preservationists, it opened as a museum to Eugene Field later that year. It was turned over to the Landmarks Association of St. Louis in 1968, and to the Eugene Field House Foundation in 1981. It was designated a National Historic Landmark in 2007, for its association with attorney Roswell Field, who was Eugene Field's father, and a lead attorney for Dred Scott. Field's legal work set the stage for Scott's final appeal to the United States Supreme Court, which was rejected in the 1857 Dred Scott v. Sandford decision, in which Chief Justice Roger B. Taney issued a decision denying African Americans United States citizenship.

A plaque on the home was dedicated in 1902 with the help of author Mark Twain, who announced it as the birthplace of Eugene Field. Field's brother Roswell, however, noted that he was born elsewhere. Twain brushed the fact aside, telling him, "Officially and for the purposes of the future, your brother was born here." The inaccurate plaque remains. The plaque reads: "Here was born Eugene Field, the Poet, 1850–1895".

== See also ==
- List of National Historic Landmarks in Missouri
- National Register of Historic Places listings in Downtown and Downtown West St. Louis

== Additional reading ==
- Marguerite Martyn, "Memories of Eugene Field by His Son: 'Pinny' Field, in St. Louis, Says the Poet Was a Child When With Children," St. Louis Post-Dispatch, September 21, 1936, image 32
