= Dred Scott v. Sandford =

1857 U.S. Supreme Court case on the citizenship of African-Americans

- Supreme Court of the United States

Argued February 11–14, 1856 Reargued December 15–18, 1856 Decided March 6, 1857
- Full case name: Dred Scott v. Sandford (Note: The respondent's surname was actually "Sanford". A Supreme Court clerk of court misspelled it as "Sandford" in 1856 and the error was never corrected.)
- Citations: 60 U.S. 393 (more) 19 How. 393; 15 L. Ed. 691; 1856 WL 8721; 1856 U.S. LEXIS 472
- Decision: Opinion

Case history
- Prior: Judgment for defendant, C.C.D. Mo.

Holding
- Judgment reversed and suit dismissed for lack of jurisdiction.: 1. Persons of African descent cannot be and were never intended to be citizens under the U.S. Constitution. Plaintiff is without standing to file a suit.; 2. The Property Clause is applicable only to lands possessed at the time of the Constitution's ratification (1787). As such, Congress cannot ban slavery in the territories. The Missouri Compromise is unconstitutional.; 3. The Due Process Clause of the Fifth Amendment prohibits the federal government from freeing slaves brought into federal territories.

Court membership
- Chief Justice Roger B. Taney Associate Justices John McLean · James M. Wayne; John Catron · Peter V. Daniel; Samuel Nelson · Robert C. Grier; Benjamin R. Curtis · John A. Campbell

Case opinions
- Majority: Taney, joined by Wayne, Catron, Daniel, Nelson, Grier, Campbell
- Concurrence: Wayne
- Concurrence: Catron
- Concurrence: Daniel
- Concurrence: Nelson, joined by Grier
- Concurrence: Grier
- Concurrence: Campbell
- Dissent: McLean
- Dissent: Curtis

Laws applied
- U.S. Const. amend. V; U.S. Const. art. IV, § 3, cl. 2; Missouri Compromise
- Superseded by
- U.S. Const. amends. XIII, XIV, XV; Civil Rights Act of 1866

Dred Scott v. Sandford, 60 U.S. (19 How.) 393 (1857), was a landmark decision of the United States Supreme Court that held that the United States Constitution did not extend American citizenship to people of black African descent, and therefore they could not enjoy the rights and privileges the Constitution conferred upon American citizens. The decision is widely considered the worst in the Supreme Court's history and is broadly denounced for its overt racism, judicial activism, and poor legal reasoning. It de jure nationalized slavery, and thus played a crucial role in the events that led to the American Civil War four years later. Legal scholar Bernard Schwartz said that it "stands first in any list of the worst Supreme Court decisions." Chief Justice Charles Evans Hughes called it the Court's "greatest self-inflicted wound".

The decision involved Dred Scott, an enslaved black man whose owners had taken him from Missouri, a slave-holding state, into Illinois and the Wisconsin Territory, where slavery was illegal. When his owners later brought him back to Missouri, Scott sued for his freedom and claimed that because he had been taken into "free" U.S. territory, he had automatically been freed and was legally no longer a slave. Scott sued first in Missouri state court, which ruled that he was still a slave under its law. He then sued in U.S. federal court, which ruled against him by deciding that it had to apply Missouri law to the case. He then appealed to the U.S. Supreme Court.

In March 1857, the Supreme Court issued a 7–2 decision against Scott. In an opinion written by Chief Justice Roger B. Taney, the Court ruled that people of African descent "are not included, and were not intended to be included, under the word 'citizens' in the Constitution, and can therefore claim none of the rights and privileges which that instrument provides for and secures to citizens of the United States"; more specifically, that African Americans were not entitled to "full liberty of speech ... to hold public meetings ... and to keep and carry arms" along with other constitutionally protected rights and privileges. Taney supported his ruling with an extended survey of American state and local laws from the time of the Constitution's drafting in 1787 that purported to show that a "perpetual and impassable barrier was intended to be erected between the white race and the one which they had reduced to slavery." Because the Court ruled that Scott was not an American citizen, he was also not a citizen of any state and, accordingly, could never establish the "diversity of citizenship" that Article III of the U.S. Constitution requires for a U.S. federal court to be able to exercise jurisdiction over a case. After ruling on those issues surrounding Scott, Taney struck down the Missouri Compromise because, by prohibiting slavery in U.S. territories north of the 36°30′ parallel, it interfered with slave owners' property rights under the Fifth Amendment to the U.S. Constitution.

Although Chief Justice Taney and several other justices hoped the decision would settle the slavery controversy, which was increasingly dividing the American public, the decision only exacerbated interstate tension. Taney's majority opinion suited the slaveholding states, but was intensely decried in all the other states. The decision inflamed the national debate over slavery and deepened the divide that led ultimately to the American Civil War. In 1865, after the Union's victory, the Court's ruling in Dred Scott was superseded by passage of the Thirteenth Amendment to the U.S. Constitution, which outlawed slavery, and by Congress with the Civil Rights Act of 1866 conferring full citizenship and equal rights flowing from it. After Southern lawyers and courts countermanded this federal law with state law, Congress and three-quarters of the states in 1868 constitutionalized the 1866 Act by enacting the Fourteenth Amendment, whose first section guaranteed citizenship for "[a]ll persons born or naturalized in the United States and subject to the jurisdiction thereof."

Historians agree that the Dred Scott decision was a major disaster for the United States and dramatically inflamed tensions leading to the Civil War. The ruling is widely considered to have been intended to bring finality to the territorial crisis resulting from the Louisiana Purchase by creating a constitutional right to own slaves anywhere in the country, while permanently disenfranchising all people of African descent, in an act generally regarded as blatant judicial activism. Often cited in proof of this is the court's decision to go out of its way to overturn the Missouri Compromise, which had already been replaced with the Kansas–Nebraska Act and thus was a legally moot issue, because the latter act was determined by the due process of popular sovereignty, and thus could not be overturned the same way as the Missouri Compromise. During the 1860 United States elections, Republicans rejected the ruling as being corrupted by partisanship and non-binding because the court had no jurisdiction. Their presidential nominee Abraham Lincoln stated he would not permit slavery anywhere in the country except where it already existed, which directly contradicted the court's ruling. His election is considered the final event that led the Southern states to secede from the Union, starting the Civil War.

== Background ==
=== Political setting ===
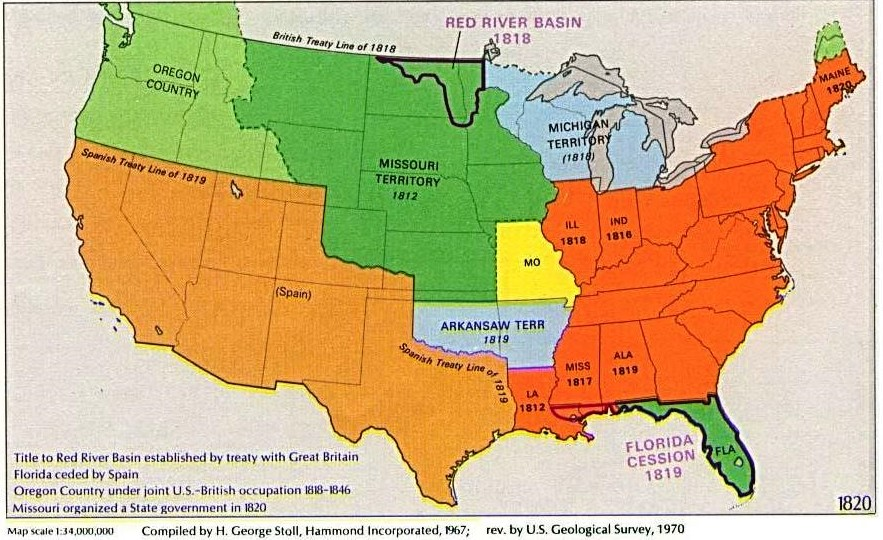
The Missouri Compromise created the slave-holding state Missouri (Mo., yellow) but prohibited slavery in the rest of the former Louisiana Territory (here, marked Missouri Territory 1812, green) north of latitude 36°30' North. Modern state boundaries are also shown.

In the late 1810s, a major political dispute arose over the creation of new U.S. states from the vast territory the United States had acquired from France in 1803 via the Louisiana Purchase. The dispute centered on whether the new states would be "free" states in which slavery would be illegal, as in the Northern states, or whether they would be "slave" states in which slavery would be legal, as in the Southern states.

In 1820, the U.S. Congress passed legislation known as the "Missouri Compromise" that was intended to resolve the dispute. The Compromise first admitted Maine into the Union as a free state, then created Missouri out of a portion of the Louisiana Purchase territory and admitted it as a slave state; it also prohibited slavery in the area north of the parallel 36°30′ north, where most of the territory lay. The legal effects of a slaveowner taking his slaves from Missouri into the free territory north of latitude 36°30′ north, as well as the constitutionality of the Missouri Compromise itself, eventually came to a head in the Dred Scott case.

=== Dred Scott and John Emerson ===
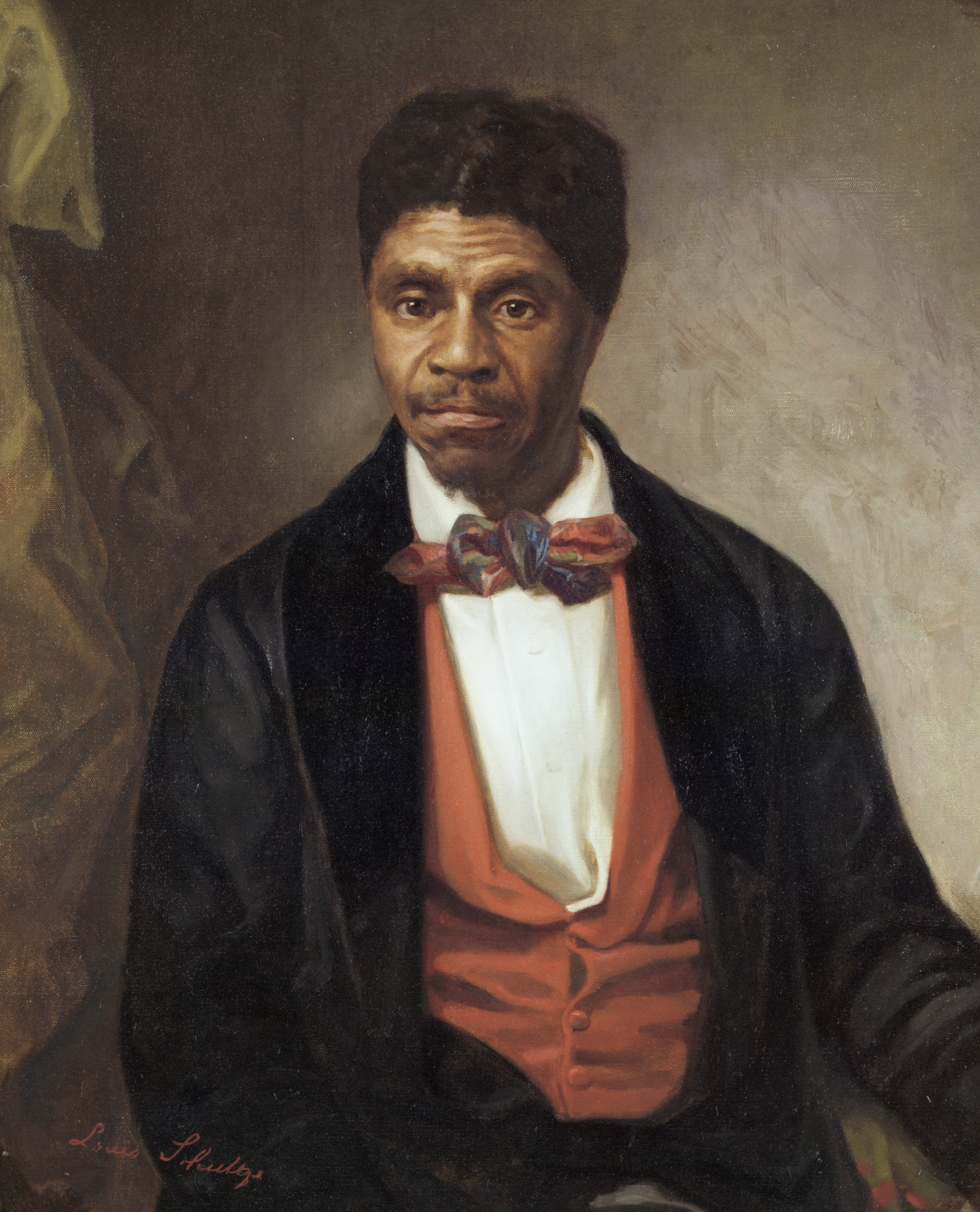
Dred Scott

Dred Scott was born a slave in Virginia around 1799. Little is known of his early years. His owner, Peter Blow, moved to Alabama in 1818, taking his six slaves along to work a farm near Huntsville. In 1830, Blow gave up farming and settled in St. Louis, Missouri, where he sold Scott to U.S. Army surgeon John Emerson. After purchasing Scott, Emerson took him to Fort Armstrong in Illinois. A free state, Illinois had been free as a territory under the Northwest Ordinance of 1787 and had prohibited slavery in its constitution in 1819 when it was admitted as a state.

In 1836, Emerson moved with Scott from Illinois to Fort Snelling in the Wisconsin Territory in what has become the state of Minnesota. Slavery in the Wisconsin Territory (some of which, including Fort Snelling, was part of the Louisiana Purchase) was prohibited by the U.S. Congress under the Missouri Compromise. During his stay at Fort Snelling, Scott married Harriet Robinson in a civil ceremony by Harriet's owner, Major Lawrence Taliaferro, a justice of the peace who was also an Indian agent. The ceremony would have been unnecessary had Dred Scott been a slave, as slave marriages had no recognition in the law.

In 1837, the army ordered Emerson to Jefferson Barracks Military Post, south of St. Louis. Emerson left Scott and his wife at Fort Snelling, where he leased their services out for profit. By hiring Scott out in a free state, Emerson was effectively bringing the institution of slavery into a free state, which was a direct violation of the Missouri Compromise, the Northwest Ordinance, and the Wisconsin Enabling Act.

==== Irene Sanford Emerson ====
Before the end of the year, the army reassigned Emerson to Fort Jesup in Louisiana, where Emerson married Eliza Irene Sanford in February 1838. Emerson sent for Scott and Harriet, who proceeded to Louisiana to serve their master and his wife. Within months, Emerson was transferred back to Fort Snelling. While en route to Fort Snelling, Scott's daughter Eliza was born on a steamboat under way on the Mississippi River between Illinois and what would become Iowa. Because Eliza was born in free territory, she was technically born as a free person under both federal and state laws. Upon entering Louisiana, the Scotts could have sued for their freedom, but did not. One scholar suggests that, in all likelihood, the Scotts would have been granted their freedom by a Louisiana court, as it had respected laws of free states that slaveholders forfeited their right to slaves if they brought them in for extended periods. This had been the holding in Louisiana state courts for more than 20 years.

Toward the end of 1838, the army reassigned Emerson back to Fort Snelling. By 1840, Emerson's wife Irene returned to St. Louis with their slaves, while John Emerson served in the Seminole War. While in St. Louis, she hired them out. In 1842, Emerson left the army. After he died in the Iowa Territory in 1843, his widow Irene inherited his estate, including the Scotts. For three years after John Emerson's death, she continued to lease out the Scotts as hired slaves. In 1846, Scott attempted to purchase his and his family's freedom, but Irene Emerson refused, prompting Scott to resort to legal recourse.

== Procedural history ==
=== Scott v. Emerson ===
==== First state circuit court trial ====
Having been unsuccessful in his attempt to purchase his freedom, Dred Scott, with the help of his legal advisers, sued Emerson for his freedom in the Circuit Court of St. Louis County on April 6, 1846. A separate petition was filed for his wife Harriet, making them the first married couple to file freedom suits in tandem in its 50-year history. They received financial assistance from the family of Dred's previous owner, Peter Blow. Blow's daughter Charlotte was married to Joseph Charless, an officer at the Bank of Missouri. Charless signed legal documents as security for the Scotts and later secured the services of the bank's attorney, Samuel Mansfield Bay, for the trial.

It was expected that the Scotts would win their freedom with relative ease. By 1846, dozens of freedom suits had been won in Missouri by former slaves. Most had claimed their legal right to freedom on the basis that they, or their mothers, had previously lived in free states or territories. Among the most important legal precedents were Winny v. Whitesides and Rachel v. Walker. In Winny v. Whitesides, the Missouri Supreme Court had ruled in 1824 that a person who had been held as a slave in Illinois, where slavery was illegal, and then brought to Missouri, was free by virtue of residence in a free state. In Rachel v. Walker, the state supreme court had ruled that a U.S. Army officer who took a slave to a military post in a territory where slavery was prohibited and retained her there for several years, had thereby "forfeit[ed] his property". Rachel, like Dred Scott, had accompanied her enslaver to Fort Snelling.

Scott was represented by three different lawyers from the filing of the original petition to the time of the actual trial, over one year later. The first was Francis B. Murdoch, a prolific freedom suit attorney who abruptly left St. Louis. Murdoch was replaced by Charles D. Drake, an in-law of the Blow family. When Drake also left the state, Samuel M. Bay took over as the Scotts' lawyer. Irene Emerson was represented by George W. Goode, a proslavery lawyer from Virginia. By the time the case went to trial, it had been reassigned from Judge John M. Krum, who was proslavery, to Judge Alexander Hamilton, who was known to be sympathetic to freedom suits.

Dred Scott v. Irene Emerson finally went to trial for the first time on June 30, 1847. Henry Peter Blow testified in court that his father had owned Dred and sold him to John Emerson. The fact that Scott had been taken to live on free soil was clearly established through depositions from witnesses who had known Scott and Dr. Emerson at Fort Armstrong and Fort Snelling. Grocer Samuel Russell testified that he had hired the Scotts from Irene Emerson and paid her father, Alexander Sanford, for their services. Upon cross-examination, however, Russell admitted that the leasing arrangements had actually been made by his wife, Adeline.

Thus, Russell's testimony was ruled hearsay, and the jury returned a verdict for Emerson. This created a seemingly contradictory outcome in which Scott was ordered by the court to remain Irene Emerson's slave, because he had been unable to prove that he was previously Irene Emerson's slave.

==== First state supreme court appeal ====
Bay moved immediately for a new trial on the basis that Scott's case had been lost due to a technicality that could be rectified, rather than because of the facts. Judge Hamilton finally issued the order for a new trial on December 2, 1847. Two days later, Emerson's lawyer objected to a new trial by filing a bill of exceptions. The case was then taken on writ of error to the Supreme Court of Missouri. Scott's new lawyers, Alexander P. Field and David N. Hall, argued that the writ of error was inappropriate because the lower court had not yet issued a final judgment. The state supreme court agreed unanimously with their position and dismissed Emerson's appeal on June 30, 1848. The main issue before the court at this stage was procedural and no substantive issues were discussed.

==== Second state circuit court trial ====
Before the state supreme court had convened, Goode had presented a motion on behalf of Emerson to have Scott taken into custody and hired out. On March 17, 1848, Judge Hamilton issued the order to the St. Louis County sheriff. (Note: Legal historian Walter Ehrlich implies that the custody order applied only to Dred Scott, while Don Fehrenbacher suggests that it applied to both Dred and Harriet.) Anyone hiring Scott had to post a bond of six hundred dollars. Wages he earned during that time were placed in escrow, to be paid to the party that prevailed in the lawsuit. Scott would remain in the sheriff's custody or hired out by him until March 18, 1857. One of Scott's lawyers, David N. Hall, hired him starting March 17, 1849.

The St. Louis Fire of 1849, a cholera epidemic, and two continuances delayed the retrial in the St. Louis Circuit Court until January 12, 1850. Irene Emerson was now defended by Hugh A. Garland and Lyman Decatur Norris, while Scott was represented by Field and Hall. Judge Alexander Hamilton was presiding. The proceedings were similar to the first trial. The same depositions from Catherine A. Anderson and Miles H. Clark were used to establish that Dr. Emerson had taken Scott to free territory.

This time, the hearsay problem was surmounted by a deposition from Adeline Russell stating that she had hired the Scotts from Irene Emerson, thereby proving that Emerson claimed them as her slaves. Samuel Russell testified in court once again that he had paid for their services. The defense then changed strategy and argued in their summation that Mrs. Emerson had every right to hire out Dred Scott, because he had lived with Dr. Emerson at Fort Armstrong and Fort Snelling under military jurisdiction, not under civil law. In doing so, the defense ignored the precedent set by Rachel v. Walker. In his rebuttal, Hall stated that the fact that they were military posts did not matter, and pointed out that Dr. Emerson had left Scott behind at Fort Snelling, hired out to others, after being reassigned to a new post.

The jury quickly returned a verdict in favor of Dred Scott, nominally making him a free man. Judge Hamilton declared Harriet, Eliza and Lizzie Scott to be free as well. Garland moved immediately for a new trial, and was overruled. On February 13, 1850, Emerson's defense filed a bill of exceptions, which was certified by Judge Hamilton, setting into motion another appeal to the Missouri Supreme Court. Counsel for the opposing sides signed an agreement that moving forward, only Dred Scott v. Irene Emerson would be advanced, and that any decision made by the high court would apply to Harriet's suit, also. In 1849 or 1850, Irene Emerson left St. Louis and moved to Springfield, Massachusetts. Her brother, John F. A. Sanford, continued looking after her business interests when she left, and her departure had no impact on the case.

==== Second state supreme court appeal ====
Both parties filed briefs with the Supreme Court of Missouri on March 8, 1850. A busy docket delayed consideration of the case until the October term. By then, the issue of slavery had become politically charged, even within the judiciary. Although the Missouri Supreme Court had not yet overturned precedent in freedom suits, in the 1840s, the court's proslavery justices had explicitly stated their opposition to freeing slaves. After the court convened on October 25, 1850, the two justices who were proslavery anti-Benton Democrats – William Barclay Napton and James Harvey Birch – persuaded John Ferguson Ryland, a Benton Democrat, to join them in a unanimous decision that Dred Scott remained a slave under Missouri law. However, Judge Napton delayed writing the court's opinion for months. Then in August 1851, both Napton and Birch lost their seats in the Missouri Supreme Court, following the state's first supreme court election, with only Ryland remaining as an incumbent. The case thus needed to be considered again by the newly elected court. The reorganized Missouri Supreme Court now included two moderates – Hamilton Gamble and John Ryland – and one staunch proslavery justice, William Scott.

David N. Hall had prepared the brief for Dred Scott but died in March 1851. Alexander P. Field continued alone as counsel for Dred Scott, and resubmitted the same briefs from 1850 for both sides. On November 29, 1851, the case was taken under consideration, on written briefs alone, and a decision was reached. However, before Judge Scott could write the court's opinion, Lyman Norris, co-counsel for Irene Emerson, obtained permission to submit a new brief he had been preparing, to replace the original one submitted by Garland.

Norris's brief has been characterized as "a sweeping denunciation of the authority of both the [Northwest] Ordinance of 1787 and the Missouri Compromise." Although he stopped short of questioning their constitutionality, Norris questioned their applicability and criticized the early Missouri Supreme Court, ridiculing former Justice George Tompkins as "the great apostle of freedom at that day."

Reviewing the court's past decisions on freedom suits, Norris acknowledged that if Rachel v. Walker was allowed to stand, his client would lose. Norris then challenged the concept of "once free, always free", and asserted that the court under Tompkins had been wrong to rule that the Ordinance of 1787 remained in force after the ratification of the U.S. Constitution in 1788. Finally, he argued that the Missouri Compromise should be disregarded whenever it interfered with Missouri law, and that the laws of other states should not be enforced, if their enforcement would cause Missouri citizens to lose their property. In support of his argument, he cited Chief Justice Taney's opinion in the United States Supreme Court case Strader v. Graham, which argued that the status of a slave returning from a free state must be determined by the slave state itself. According to historian Walter Ehrlich, the closing of Norris's brief was "a racist harangue that not only revealed the prejudices of its author, but also indicated how the Dred Scott case had become a vehicle for the expression of such views". Noting that Norris's proslavery "doctrines" were later incorporated into the court's final decision, Ehrlich writes (emphasis his):

From this point on, the Dred Scott case clearly changed from a genuine freedom suit to the controversial political issue for which it became infamous in American history.

On March 22, 1852, Judge William Scott announced the decision of the Missouri Supreme Court that Dred Scott remained a slave, and ordered the trial court's judgment to be reversed. Judge Ryland concurred, while Chief Justice Hamilton Gamble dissented. The majority opinion written by Judge Scott focused on the issue of comity or conflict of laws, and relied on states' rights rhetoric:

Every State has the right of determining how far, in a spirit of comity, it will respect the laws of other States. Those laws have no intrinsic right to be enforced beyond the limits of the State for which they were enacted. The respect allowed them will depend altogether on their conformity to the policy of our institutions. No State is bound to carry into effect enactments conceived in a spirit hostile to that which pervades her own laws.

Judge Scott did not deny the constitutionality of the Missouri Compromise and acknowledged that its prohibition of slavery was "absolute", but only within the specified territory. Thus, a slave crossing the border could obtain his freedom, but only within the court of the free state. Rejecting the court's own precedent, Scott argued that "'Once free' did not necessarily mean 'always free.'" He cited the Kentucky Court of Appeals decision in Graham v. Strader, which had held that a Kentucky slaveowner who permitted a slave to go to Ohio temporarily, did not forfeit ownership of the slave. To justify overturning three decades of precedent, Judge Scott argued that circumstances had changed:

Times now are not as they were when the former decisions on this subject were made. Since then not only individuals but States have been possessed with a dark and fell spirit in relation to slavery, whose gratification is sought in the pursuit of measures, whose inevitable consequence must be the overthrow and destruction of our government. Under such circumstances it does not behoove the State of Missouri to show the least countenance to any measure which might gratify this spirit. She is willing to assume her full responsibility for the existence of slavery within her limits, nor does she seek to share or divide it with others.

On March 23, 1852, the day after the Missouri Supreme Court decision had been announced, Irene Emerson's lawyers filed an order in the St. Louis Circuit Court for the bonds signed by the Blow family to cover the Scotts' court costs; return of the slaves themselves; and transfer of their wages earned over four years, plus 6 percent interest. On June 29, 1852, Judge Hamilton overruled the order.

=== Scott v. Sanford ===
The case looked hopeless, and the Blow family could no longer pay for Scott's legal costs. Scott also lost both of his lawyers when Alexander Field moved to Louisiana and David Hall died. The case was undertaken pro bono by Roswell Field, who employed Scott as a janitor. Field also discussed the case with LaBeaume, who had taken over the lease on the Scotts in 1851. After the Missouri Supreme Court decision, Judge Hamilton turned down a request by Emerson's lawyers to release the rent payments from escrow and to deliver the slaves into their owner's custody.

In 1853, Dred Scott again sued his current owner John Sanford, but this time in federal court. Sanford returned to New York and the federal courts had diversity jurisdiction under Article III, Section 2 of the U.S. Constitution. In addition to the existing complaints, Scott alleged that Sanford had assaulted his family and held them captive for six hours on January 1, 1853.

At trial in 1854, Judge Robert William Wells directed the jury to rely on Missouri law on the question of Scott's freedom. Since the Missouri Supreme Court had held that Scott remained a slave, the jury found in favor of Sanford. Scott then appealed to the U.S. Supreme Court, where the clerk misspelled the defendant's name, and the case was recorded as Dred Scott v. Sandford, with an ever-erroneous title. Scott was represented before the Supreme Court by Montgomery Blair and George Ticknor Curtis, whose brother Benjamin was a Supreme Court Justice. Sanford was represented by Reverdy Johnson and Henry S. Geyer.

=== Sanford as defendant ===
When the case was filed, the two sides agreed on a statement of facts that claimed Scott had been sold by Dr. Emerson to John Sanford, though this was a legal fiction. Dr. Emerson had died in 1843, and Dred Scott had filed his 1847 suit against Irene Emerson. There is no record of Dred Scott's transfer to Sanford or of his transfer back to Irene. John Sanford died shortly before Scott's manumission, and Scott was not listed in the probate records of Sanford's estate. Also, Sanford was not acting as Dr. Emerson's executor, as he was never appointed by a probate court, and the Emerson estate had been settled when the federal case was filed.

The murky circumstances of ownership led many to conclude the parties to Dred Scott v. Sandford contrived to create a test case. Mrs. Emerson's remarriage to abolitionist U.S. Representative Calvin C. Chaffee seemed suspicious to contemporaries, and Sanford was thought to be a front and to have allowed himself to be sued, despite not actually being Scott's owner. Nevertheless, Sanford had been involved in the case since 1847, before his sister married Chaffee. He had secured counsel for his sister in the state case, and he engaged the same lawyer for his own defense in the federal case. Sanford also consented to be represented by genuine pro-slavery advocates before the Supreme Court, rather than to put up a token defense.

=== Influence of President Buchanan ===
Historians discovered that after the Supreme Court heard arguments in the case but before it issued a ruling, President-elect James Buchanan wrote to his friend, Supreme Court Associate Justice John Catron, to ask whether the case would be decided by the Court before his inauguration in March 1857. Buchanan hoped that the decision would quell unrest in the country over the slavery issue by issuing a ruling to take it out of political debate. He later successfully pressured Associate Justice Robert Cooper Grier, a Northerner, to join the Southern majority in Dred Scott to prevent the appearance that the decision was made along sectional lines. According to historian Paul Finkelman:

Buchanan already knew what the Court was going to decide. In a major breach of Court etiquette, Justice Grier, who, like Buchanan, was from Pennsylvania, had kept the President-elect fully informed about the progress of the case and the internal debates within the Court. When Buchanan urged the nation to support the decision, he already knew what Taney would say. Republican suspicions of impropriety turned out to be fully justified.

Biographer Jean H. Baker argues that Buchanan's use of political pressure on a member of a sitting court was regarded then, as now, to be highly improper. Republicans fueled speculation as to Buchanan's influence by publicizing that Taney had secretly informed Buchanan of the decision. Buchanan declared in his inaugural address that the slavery question would "be speedily and finally settled" by the Supreme Court.

== Supreme Court decision ==
On March 6, 1857, the U.S. Supreme Court ruled against Dred Scott in a 7–2 decision that fills more than 200 pages in the United States Reports. It was one of the longest set of opinions in Supreme Court history up to that point. The decision contains opinions from all nine justices, but the "majority opinion" has always been the focus of the controversy.

=== Opinion of the Court ===
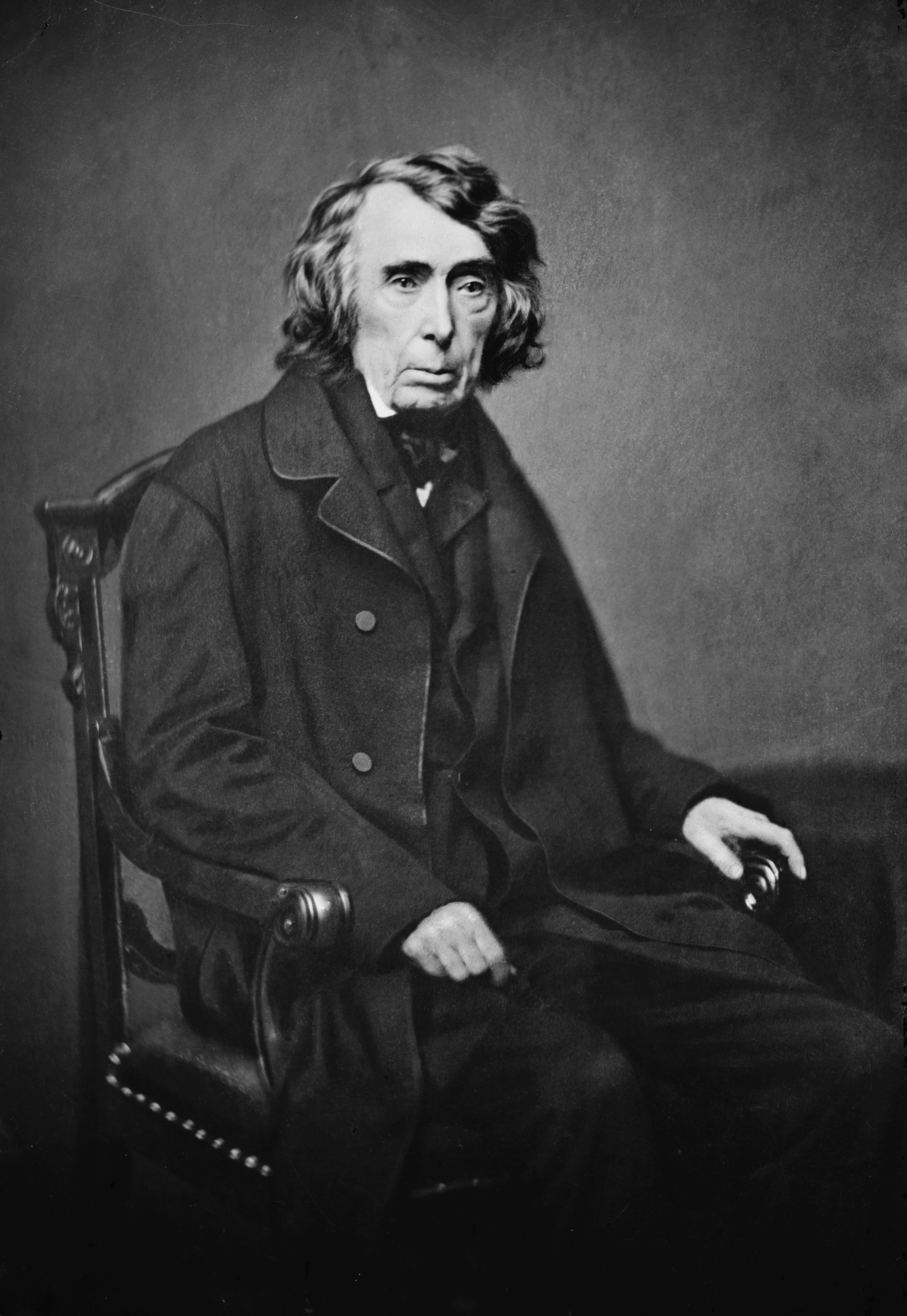
Chief Justice Roger Taney, the author of the majority opinion in the Supreme Court's Dred Scott decision

Seven justices formed the majority and joined an opinion written by Chief Justice Roger Taney. Taney began the Court's opinion with what he saw as the core issue in the case: whether Black people could possess federal citizenship under the U.S. Constitution.

The question is simply this: Can a negro, whose ancestors were imported into this country, and sold as slaves, become a member of the political community formed and brought into existence by the Constitution of the United States, and as such become entitled to all of the rights, and privileges, and immunities, guarantied [sic] by that instrument to the citizen?

— Dred Scott, 60 U.S. at 403.

In answer, the Court ruled they could not. It held that black people could not be U.S. citizens, and therefore a lawsuit to which they were a party could never qualify for the "diversity of citizenship" that Article III of the Constitution requires for a federal court to have jurisdiction over a case that does not involve a question of federal law.

The primary rationale for the Court's ruling was Taney's assertion that black African slaves and their descendants were never intended to be part of the American social and political community:

We think ... that they [black people] are not included, and were not intended to be included, under the word "citizens" in the Constitution, and can therefore claim none of the rights and privileges which that instrument provides for and secures to citizens of the United States. On the contrary, they were at that time [of America's founding] considered as a subordinate and inferior class of beings who had been subjugated by the dominant race, and, whether emancipated or not, yet remained subject to their authority, and had no rights or privileges but such as those who held the power and the Government might choose to grant them.

— Dred Scott, 60 U.S. at 404–405.

The Court extensively reviewed laws from the original American states that involved the status of black Americans at the time of America's founding. It concluded that these laws showed that a "perpetual and impassable barrier was intended to be erected between the white race and the one which they had reduced to slavery". The Court therefore ruled that black people were not American citizens and could not sue as citizens in federal courts. This meant that U.S. states lacked the power to alter the legal status of black people by granting them state citizenship:

It is difficult at this day to realize the state of public opinion in relation to that unfortunate race which prevailed in the civilized and enlightened portions of the world at the time of the Declaration of Independence and when the Constitution of the United States was framed and adopted.... They had for more than a century before been regarded as beings of an inferior order ... and so far inferior that they had no rights which the white man was bound to respect, and that the negro might justly and lawfully be reduced to slavery for his benefit.

— Dred Scott, 60 U.S. at 407.

This holding normally would have ended the decision, since it disposed of Dred Scott's case by effectively declaring that Scott had no standing to bring suit, but Taney did not confine his ruling to the matter immediately before the Court. He went on to assess the constitutionality of the Missouri Compromise itself, writing that the Compromise's legal provisions intended to free slaves who were living north of the 36°N 30' latitude line in the western territories. In the Court's judgment, this constituted the government depriving owners of slave property without due process of law, which is forbidden under the Fifth Amendment. Taney also reasoned that the Constitution and the Bill of Rights implicitly precluded any possibility of constitutional rights for black African slaves and their descendants. Thus, Taney concluded:

Now, ... the right of property in a slave is distinctly and expressly affirmed in the Constitution. ... Upon these considerations, it is the opinion of the court that the act of Congress which prohibited a citizen from holding and owning property of this kind in the territory of the United States north of the [36°N 30' latitude] line therein mentioned is not warranted by the Constitution, and is therefore void....

— Dred Scott, 60 U.S. at 451–52.

Taney held that the Missouri Compromise was unconstitutional, marking the first time since the 1803 case Marbury v. Madison that the Supreme Court had struck down a federal law, although the Missouri Compromise had already been effectively overridden by the Kansas–Nebraska Act. Taney based this argument on a narrow interpretation of the Property Clause of Article 4, Section 3 of the Constitution: "The Congress shall have Power to dispose of and make all needful Rules and Regulations respecting the Territory or other Property belonging to the United States..." He ruled that the Property Clause "applied only to the property which the States held in common at that time and has no reference whatever to any territory or other property which the new sovereignty might afterwards itself acquire." Because the Louisiana Territory was not part of the United States at the time of the Constitution's ratification, Congress did not have the authority to ban slavery in the territory. Thus, the Missouri Compromise exceeded the scope of Congress's powers and was unconstitutional, and hence Dred Scott was still a slave regardless of his residence in the purportedly free Northwest Territory, and he was still a slave under Missouri law, which had proper authority over the matter. For all these reasons, the Court concluded that Scott could not bring suit in U.S. federal court.

=== Concurrences ===
Justices Wayne, Catron, Daniel, Nelson, Grier, and Campbell all wrote separate concurrences, with Grier joining Nelson's concurrence.

=== Dissents ===
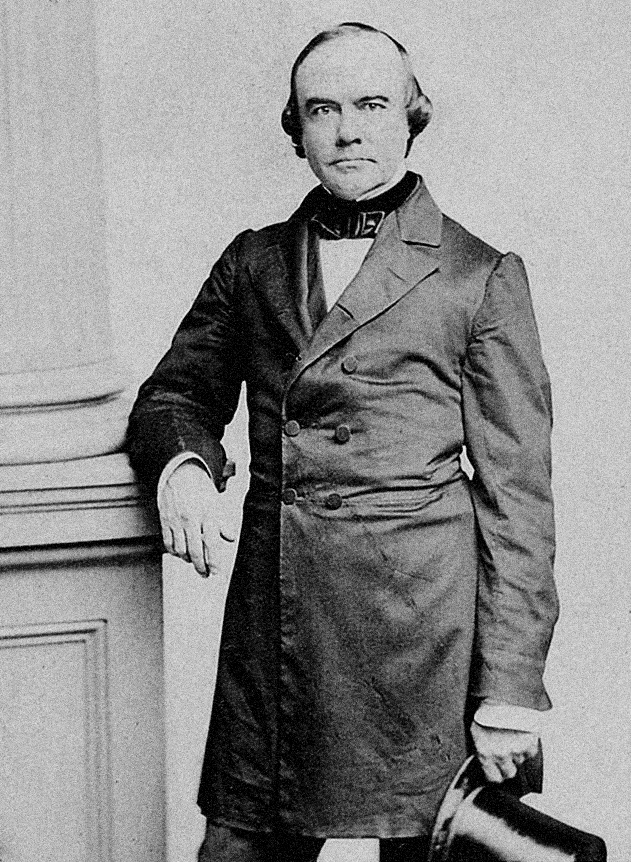
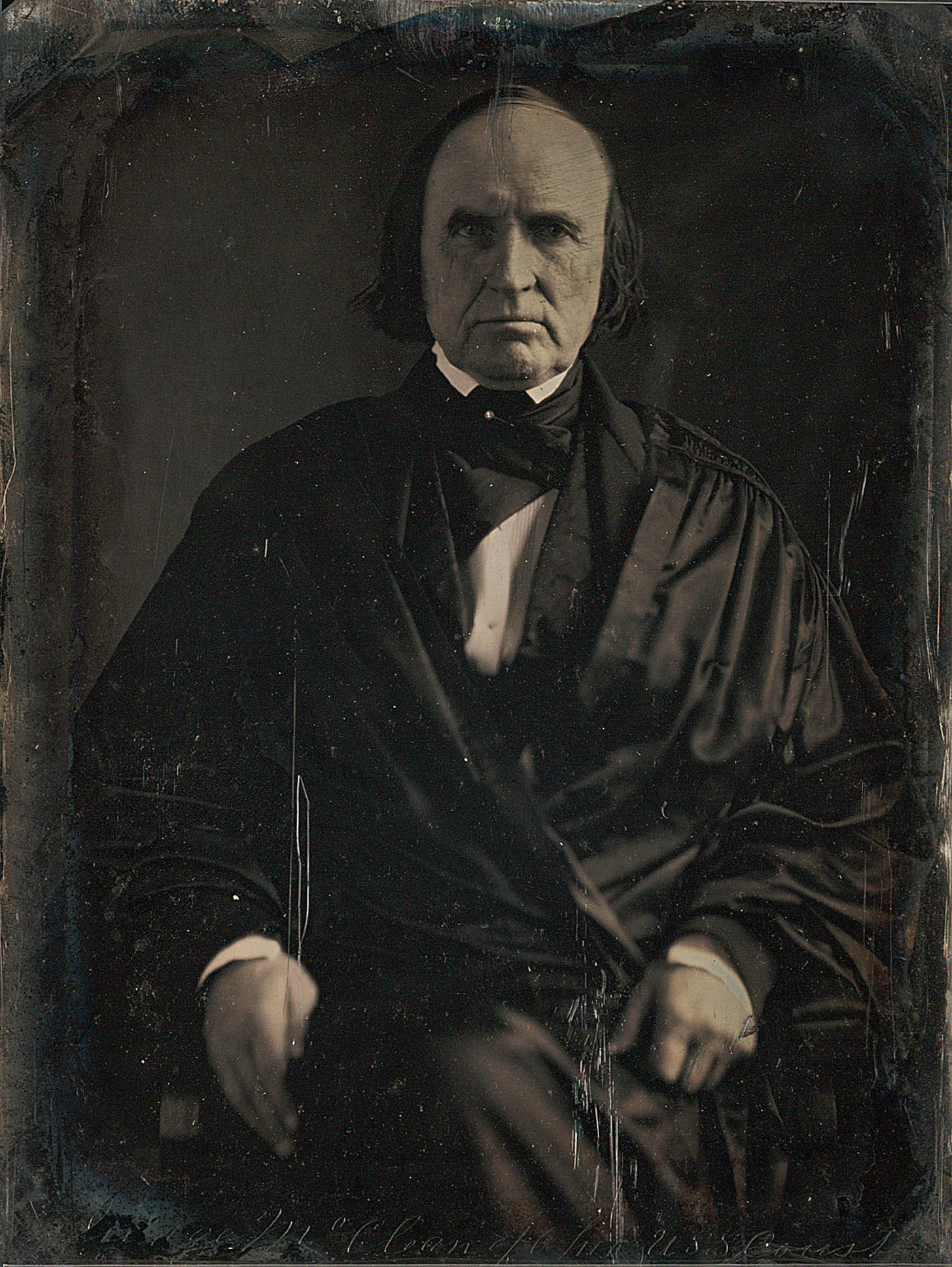
Justices Benjamin Robbins Curtis (left) and John McLean (right), the only two justices who dissented in Dred Scott

Two justices, Benjamin Robbins Curtis and John McLean, dissented from the Court's decision and wrote dissenting opinions.

Curtis's 67-page dissent argued that the Court's conclusion that black people could not be U.S. citizens was legally and historically baseless. He pointed out that when the Constitution was adopted in 1789, black men could vote in 5 of the 13 states. Under the law, that made them citizens both of their individual states and of the United States. Curtis cited many historical state laws and court decisions in support of his position. His dissent was "extremely persuasive", and it prompted Taney to delay issuing the decision for several weeks while he added 18 pages of rebuttal to the majority opinion.

McLean's dissent deemed the argument that a black citizen would not be "an agreeable member of society" as "more a matter of taste than of law," accusing the Court of concocting an opinion from racial preference rather than legal precedent. He attacked much of the Court's decision as non-binding obiter dicta, arguing that once the court determined that it did not have jurisdiction to hear Scott's case, it should have simply dismissed the action without passing judgment on the merits of Scott's lawsuit.

Curtis and McLean both attacked the Court's overturning of the Missouri Compromise. They noted that it was not necessary to decide the question, and that none of the authors of the Constitution had ever raised constitutional objections to the antislavery provisions of the Northwest Ordinance, or the subsequent acts that barred slavery north of 36°30' N, or the prohibition on importing slaves from overseas passed in 1808. Curtis said slavery was not listed in the constitution as a "natural right", but rather was a creation of public law. Article IV, section 3 of the Constitution states, "The Congress shall have Power to dispose of and make all needful Rules and Regulations respecting the Territory or other Property belonging to the United States; and nothing in this Constitution shall be so construed as to Prejudice any Claims of the United States, or of any particular State." No exception was made for slavery, which thus fell under the regulatory power of Congress.

== Reactions ==
The Supreme Court's decision in Dred Scott was greeted with widespread fury outside the slave-holding states. American political historian Robert G. McCloskey described the reaction:

The tempest of malediction that burst over the judges seems to have stunned them; far from extinguishing the slavery controversy, they had fanned its flames and had, moreover, deeply endangered the security of the judicial arm of government. No such vilification as this had been heard even in the wrathful days following the Alien and Sedition Acts. Taney’s opinion was assailed by the Northern press as a wicked "stump speech" and was shamefully misquoted and distorted. "If the people obey this decision," said one newspaper, "they disobey God."

Many Republicans, including Abraham Lincoln, who was rapidly becoming the leading Republican in Illinois and was elected President three years later, regarded the decision as part of a plot to expand and eventually impose the legalization of slavery throughout all of the states. Some southern extremists wanted all states to recognize slavery as a constitutional right. Lincoln rejected the court's majority opinion that "the right of property in a slave is distinctly and expressly affirmed in the Constitution," pointing out that the constitution did not ever refer to slaves as property, and in fact explicitly called them "persons".

Southern Democrats considered Republicans to be lawless rebels who were provoking disunion by their refusal to accept the Supreme Court's decision as the law of the land. Many northern opponents of slavery offered a legal argument for refusing to acknowledge the Dred Scott decision on the Missouri Compromise. They argued, following Justice Curtis' dissenting opinion, that the Court's determination that the federal courts had no jurisdiction to hear the case rendered the remainder of the decision a non-binding obiter dictum—an advisement rather than an authoritative interpretation of the law. Stephen Douglas attacked that position in the Lincoln–Douglas debates:

Mr. Lincoln goes for a warfare upon the Supreme Court of the United States, because of their judicial decision in the Dred Scott case. I yield obedience to the decisions in that court—to the final determination of the highest judicial tribunal known to our constitution.

In a speech at Springfield, Illinois, Lincoln responded that the Republican Party was not seeking to defy the Supreme Court, but he hoped they could convince it to reverse its ruling:

We believe, as much as Judge Douglas, (perhaps more) in obedience to, and respect for the judicial department of government. We think its decisions on Constitutional questions, when fully settled, should control, not only the particular cases decided, but the general policy of the country, subject to be disturbed only by amendment of the Constitution as provided in that instrument itself. More than this would be revolution. But we think the Dred Scott decision is erroneous. We know the court that made it, has often over-ruled its own decisions, and we shall do what we can to have it to over-rule this. We offer no resistance to it.

Democrats had previously refused to accept the court's interpretation of the U.S. Constitution as permanently binding. During the Andrew Jackson administration, Taney, then Attorney General, had written:

Whatever may be the force of the decision of the Supreme Court in binding the parties and settling their rights in the particular case before them, I am not prepared to admit that a construction given to the constitution by the Supreme Court in deciding any one or more cases fixes of itself irrevokably [sic] and permanently its construction in that particular and binds the states and the Legislative and executive branches of the General government, forever afterwards to conform to it and adopt it in every other case as the true reading of the instrument although all of them may unite in believing it erroneous.

Frederick Douglass, a prominent black abolitionist who considered the decision to be unconstitutional and Taney's reasoning contrary to the Founding Fathers' vision, predicted that the decision would bring the conflict over slavery to a head:

The highest authority has spoken. The voice of the Supreme Court has gone out over the troubled waves of the National Conscience.... [But] my hopes were never brighter than now. I have no fear that the National Conscience will be put to sleep by such an open, glaring, and scandalous tissue of lies....

According to Jefferson Davis, then U.S. Senator from Mississippi and later President of the Confederacy, the case merely "presented the question whether Cuffee [a derogatory term for a black person] should be kept in his normal condition or not ... [and] whether the Congress of the United States could decide what might or might not be property in a Territory–the case being that of an officer of the army sent into a Territory to perform his public duty, having taken with him his negro slave".

== Impact on the litigants ==
Irene Emerson moved to Massachusetts in 1850 and married Calvin C. Chaffee, a doctor and abolitionist who was elected to Congress on the Know Nothing and Republican tickets. Following the Supreme Court ruling, pro-slavery newspapers attacked Chaffee as a hypocrite. Chaffee protested that Dred Scott belonged to his brother-in-law and that he had nothing to do with Scott's enslavement. Nevertheless, as a means of freeing Scott, the Chaffees executed a deed transferring the Scott family to Henry Taylor Blow, the son of Scott's former owner, who could appear in person before the Missouri court. Taylor Blow had also previously contributed to Scott's legal fees during the case.

Taylor Blow filed the manumission papers with Judge Hamilton on May 26, 1857. The emancipation of Dred Scott and his family was national news and was celebrated in northern cities. Scott worked as a porter in a hotel in St. Louis, where he was a minor celebrity. His wife took in laundry. Dred Scott died of tuberculosis on November 7, 1858. Harriet died on June 17, 1876.

== Aftermath ==
=== Economic ===
Economist Charles Calomiris and historian Larry Schweikart discovered that uncertainty about whether the entire West would suddenly become slave territory or engulfed in guerilla conflict like "Bleeding Kansas" gripped the markets immediately. The east–west railroads became insolvent immediately (although north–south lines were unaffected), in turn causing dangerous runs on several large banks, events known as the Panic of 1857.

This financial panic, unlike that of 1837, almost exclusively impacted the North, which the historians attribute to the North's system of unit banking, with many competing banks hiding financial information from one another, breeding uncertainty. In contrast, the South's branch banking system allowed information to move reliably among the branch banks, and transmission of the panic was minor.

=== Political ===
Southerners, who had grown uncomfortable with the Kansas-Nebraska Act, argued that they had a constitutional right to bring slaves into the territories, regardless of any decision by a territorial legislature on the subject. The Dred Scott decision seemed to endorse that view.

Although Taney believed that the decision represented a compromise that would be a final settlement of the slavery question by transforming a contested political issue into a matter of settled law, the decision produced the opposite result. It strengthened Northern opposition to slavery, divided the Democratic Party on sectional lines, encouraged secessionist elements among Southern supporters of slavery to make bolder demands, and strengthened the Republican Party.

In 1860, the Republican Party explicitly rejected the Dred Scott decision in their official platform, stating, "the new dogma that the Constitution, of its own force, carries slavery into any or all of the territories of the United States, is a dangerous political heresy, at variance with the explicit provisions of that instrument itself, with contemporaneous exposition, and with legislative and judicial precedent; is revolutionary in its tendency, and subversive of the peace and harmony of the country."

The Territorial Slavery Act of 1862 repudiated Dred Scott. In adopting the act, Congress essentially took the view that the Dred Scott ruling was restricted solely to Dred Scott and his family.

== Later references ==
In 1859, when defending two black men, John Anthony Copeland and Shields Green, from the charge of treason following their participation in John Brown's raid on Harpers Ferry, their attorney George Sennott cited the Dred Scott decision in arguing successfully that since they were not citizens according to that Supreme Court ruling, they could not commit treason. Nevertheless, they were found guilty and executed on other charges.

In 1896, in the Jim Crow era, Justice John Marshall Harlan was the lone dissenting vote in Plessy v. Ferguson (1896), which declared racial segregation constitutional and created the concept of "separate but equal". In his dissent, Harlan wrote that the majority's opinion would "prove to be quite as pernicious as the decision made by this tribunal in the Dred Scott case".

Charles Evans Hughes, writing in 1927 on the Supreme Court's history, described Dred Scott as a "self-inflicted wound" from which the court would not recover for many years.

In 1952, as a law clerk to Justice Robert H. Jackson, future Chief Justice William H. Rehnquist wrote in a memo on Brown v. Board of Education: "Scott v. Sandford was the result of Taney's effort to protect slaveholders from legislative interference."

Dissenting from Planned Parenthood v. Casey (1992), insofar as it upheld the right to abortion established by Roe v. Wade (1973), Justice Antonin Scalia compared the rationale behind Planned Parenthood v. Casey to Dred Scott:

Dred Scott ... rested upon the concept of "substantive due process" that the Court praises and employs today. Indeed, Dred Scott was "very possibly the first application of substantive due process in the Supreme Court, the original precedent for ... Roe v. Wade".

Justice Clarence Thomas similarly compared Roe v. Wade to Dred Scott in his concurring opinion in Dobbs v. Jackson Women's Health Organization, the decision overturning Roe v. Wade in 2022.

Chief Justice John Roberts compared Obergefell v. Hodges (2015) to Dred Scott as another example of trying to settle a contentious issue through a ruling that went beyond the scope of the Constitution.

Historian Sean Wilentz called Trump v. United States, the 2024 Supreme Court decision that conferred immunity from criminal prosecution on a president's official acts, "The 'Dred Scott' of Our Time." Other writers made the same comparison.

== Legacy ==
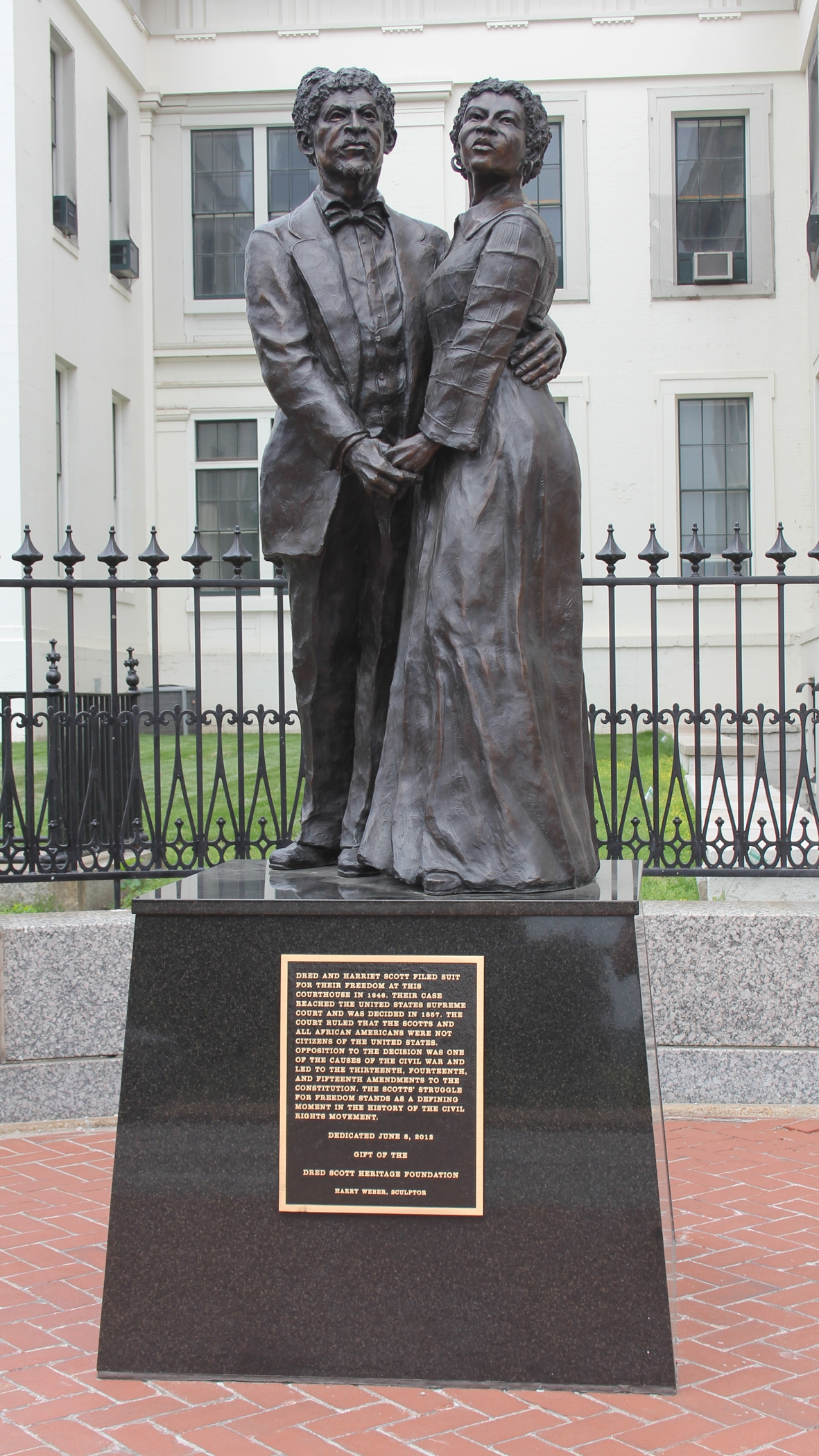
Dred and Harriet Scott Statue in St. Louis

- 1977: The Scotts' great-grandson John A. Madison Jr., an attorney, gave the invocation at the ceremony at the Old Courthouse in St. Louis, a National Historic Landmark, for the dedication of a National Historic Marker commemorating the Scotts' case tried there.
- 2000: Harriet and Dred Scott's petition papers in their freedom suit were displayed at the main branch of the St. Louis Public Library, following the discovery of more than 300 freedom suits in the archives of the U.S. circuit court.
- 2006: A historic plaque was erected at the Old Courthouse to honor the active roles of both Dred and Harriet Scott in their freedom suit and the case's significance in U.S. history.
- 2012: A monument depicting Dred and Harriet Scott was erected at the Old Courthouse's east entrance facing the St. Louis Gateway Arch.
- 2024: During the 2024 presidential campaign, the National Federation of Republican Assemblies cited Dred Scott v. Sandford to claim that Vice President Kamala Harris is not a natural born U.S. citizen and therefore is ineligible to run for president.

== See also ==
- Anticanon
- American slave court cases
- Origins of the American Civil War
- Timeline of the civil rights movement
