= Roswell Field =

American lawyer, politician (1807–1869)

Roswell Martin Field
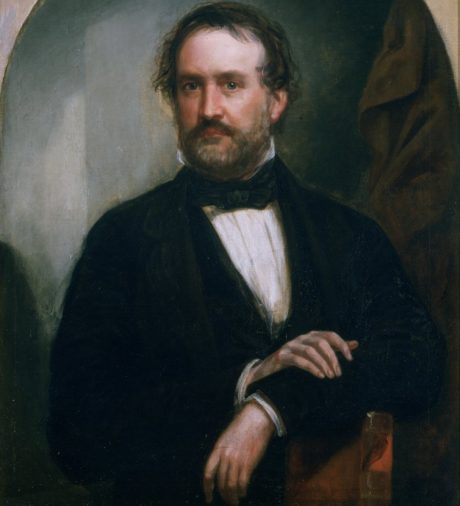

Member of the Vermont House of Representatives from Newfane
- In office 1835–1837
- Succeeded by: James Elliot

Personal details
- Born: February 2, 1807 Newfane, Vermont, U.S.
- Died: July 12, 1869 (aged 62) St. Louis, Missouri, U.S.
- Resting place: Bellefontaine Cemetery
- Spouse(s): Mary Almira Phelps (annulled), Frances Reed (m. 1848–1856; death)
- Relations: Daniel Kellogg (maternal uncle)
- Children: 6, including Eugene Field
- Education: Middlebury College
- Occupation: Lawyer, politician

Roswell Martin Field (February 2, 1807 – July 12, 1869) was an American lawyer and politician. He served on the Vermont House of Representatives. Field was one of the attorneys for the enslaved Dred and Harriet Scott and their daughters in 1853; as related to Dred Scott v. Sandford, where he argued for the rights of African-Americans to earn United States citizenship. He was from the prominent Field family of Vermont.

== Biography ==
Roswell Martin Field was born on February 2, 1807, in Newfane, Vermont, to parents Esther Smith (née Kellogg) and Gen. Martin Field. He was born in southern Vermont to a prominent New England family. Field studied at Middlebury College (class of 1822), where he studied under his uncle Hon. Daniel Kellogg.

Field became a lawyer in Vermont in 1825. He served in the Vermont House of Representatives from 1835 to 1837, and was succeeded by James Elliot.

Field had married in October 1832 after a very short period of dating, and his new wife Mary Almira Phelps was asking for a private annulment their marriage after it was not consummated. Phelps then married another man in Boston within one month of her marriage to Field, and Field spent the next nine years in courts trying to legally prove his marriage was valid. He lost his very public case in the Vermont Supreme Court. He left his home state after dealing with his marriage humiliation, and in 1839, Field moved to St. Louis. In 1848, Field married Frances Reed in St. Louis, who was also from Vermont.

=== Dred Scott v. Sandford ===
Roswell Field was of no family relation to lawyer Alexander Field, who had worked on the Dred Scott legal case earlier, but they were friends. In 1853, Roswell Field agreed to start work on the Scott case, pro-bono, and suggested a lawsuit in the federal courts under the diverse-citizenship clause, to allow lawsuits between parties who are residents of different states.

Field had arranged for Montgomery Blair, a high-profile lawyer living in Washington, D.C. to serve as the defense counsel and argue the Scott's case before the United States Supreme Court. Dred Scott was the slave of a United States Army physician, who had taken his enslaved servant along for prolonged stays in free territory. On Scott's behalf, Blair argued that the time the black man had spent in the free state of Illinois and in Minnesota, free territory since the Northwest Ordinance of 1787, therefore it made him a free man.

== Death and legacy ==
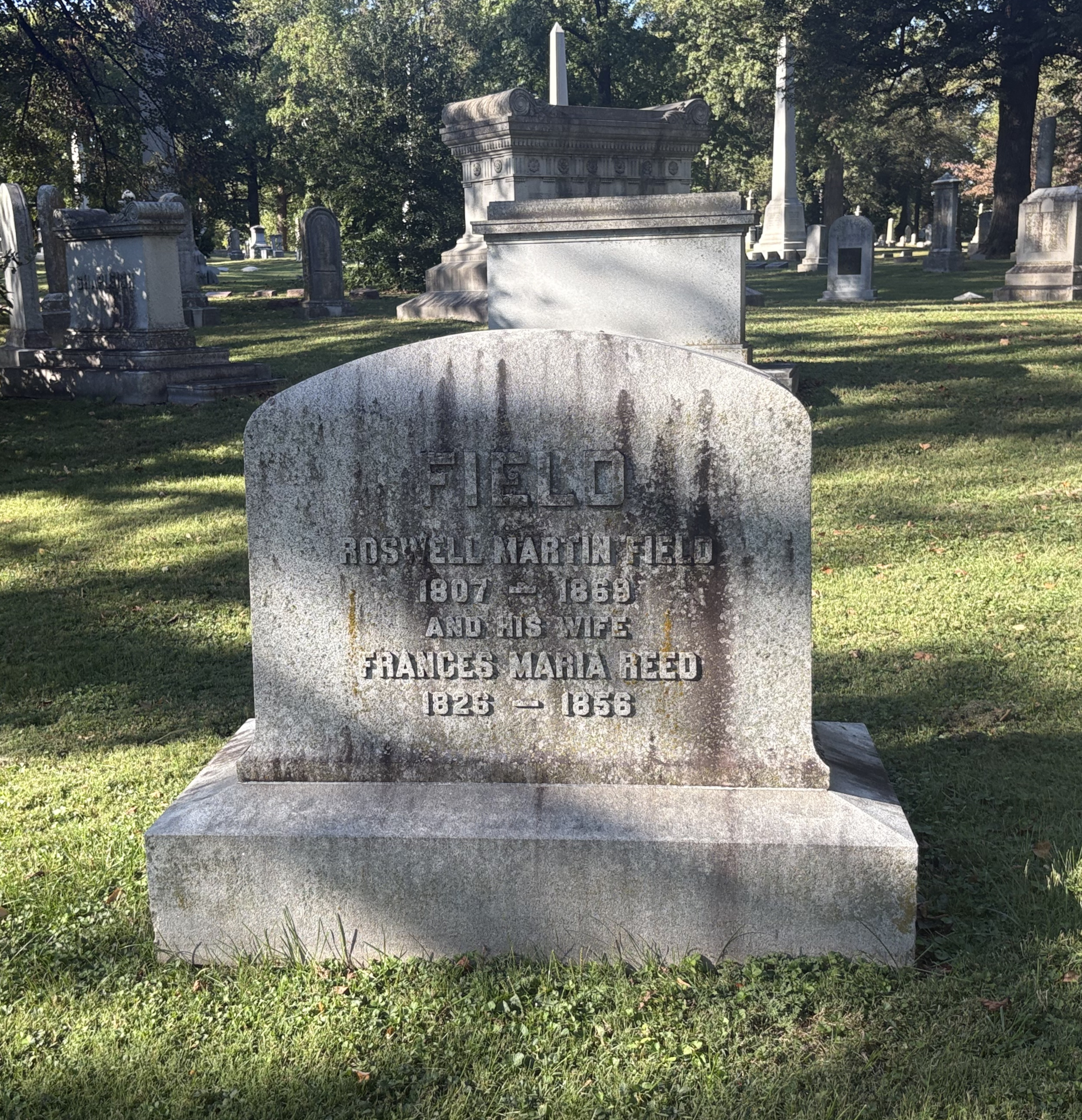
Field's gravestone

Field died on July 12, 1869, in St. Louis, Missouri, and is interrned at Bellefontaine Cemetery in St. Louis.

He had six children but four of them died in early childhood. His two sons became writers and poets, one was Roswell Martin Field (1851–1919), and the other was Eugene Field. They all lived together in a house in St. Louis which is now a museum called the "Eugene Field House", or alternatively the "Field House Museum".

Field was the subject of the biography, Dred Scott's Advocate: A Biography of Roswell M. Field (University of Missouri Press, 1996) by Kenneth C. Kaufman.

== See also ==
- Diana Cephas
