= George Tompkins =

American judge (1780–1846)

George Tompkins (March 20, 1780 – April 7, 1846) was a justice of the Supreme Court of Missouri from 1824 to 1845.

== Early life ==
Born in Caroline County, Virginia, the second youngest of thirteen children, Tompkins was of English descent, his ancestors having been among the early settlers of Virginia. His family "owned large tracts of land and many slaves, and were largely engaged in the cultivation of tobacco". His parents were Benjamin Tompkins and Elizabeth Goodloe.

Sometime around the age of seventeen or eighteen, he left Virginia and lived in Ohio and in Jefferson County, Kentucky, for several years. He taught school and also studied law in his free time. He did not stay in Kentucky long before moving to Missouri. In Missouri, Tompkins taught at the first English school in St. Louis, where most inhabitants spoke French.

== Law and judicial career ==
He settled in Franklin, Howard County, Missouri, in 1816, and opened a law practice. He was twice elected to the Territorial Legislature in St. Charles. In 1824, Tompkins was appointed to the Missouri Supreme Court, where he remained until he reached the mandatory retirement age of 65. Tompkins' retirement came just a few years before the Dred Scott case was brought before the Missouri Supreme Court. During his time as a judge, Tompkins expressed abolitionists views and, through about a dozen cases, established a precedent that since Missouri was a free state, if slaves were brought into the state, they should be freed. Despite this, the Supreme Court ruled against Dred Scott in his case for freedom.

== Later life and death ==
Upon retirement, Tompkins returned to his farm near Jefferson City, Missouri, where he died on April 7, 1846, at the age of 67.
