= Charles Delano =

American politician

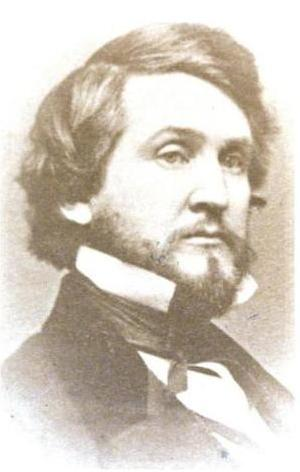

Member of the U.S. House of Representatives from Massachusetts's 10th district
- In office March 4, 1859 – March 3, 1863
- Preceded by: Calvin C. Chaffee
- Succeeded by: Henry L. Dawes

Personal details
- Born: June 24, 1820 New Braintree, Massachusetts, US
- Died: January 23, 1883 (aged 62) Northampton, Massachusetts, US
- Resting place: Bridge Street Cemetery, Northampton
- Party: Republican

Charles Delano (June 24, 1820 – January 23, 1883) was a U.S. representative from Massachusetts.

Born in New Braintree, Massachusetts, Delano moved with his parents to Amherst in 1833. He attended the common schools and graduated from Amherst College in 1840, where he studied law. Delano was admitted to the bar in 1842 and commenced practice in Amherst. He moved to Northampton in 1848 and continued the practice of law. He served as Treasurer of Hampshire County from 1849 to 1858.

Delano was elected as a Republican to the Thirty-sixth and Thirty-seventh Congresses. He was not a candidate for renomination in 1862, and resumed the practice of law.

In 1874, Delano was appointed to be an assistant coroner for the inquest into deaths that resulted from a dam break on the Mill River, which caused a flood in Williamsburg, Massachusetts. Later he served as a trustee of the Clarke School for the Education of the Deaf from 1877 to 1883.

Delano was appointed by Governor Alexander H. Rice in 1878 to act as special counsel for the Commonwealth of Massachusetts in matters relating to the Hoosac Tunnel and the Troy and Greenfield Railroad, and served in this capacity until his death in Northampton on January 23, 1883. He was interred in Bridge Street Cemetery.

== References and external links ==
- Sharpe, Elizabeth M. (2004). In the Shadow of the Dam: The Aftermath of the Mill River Flood of 1874. New York: Free Press. ISBN 0-7432-2357-8.
- United States Congress. "Charles Delano (id: D000213)". Biographical Directory of the United States Congress.

U.S. House of Representatives
Preceded by Calvin C. Chaffee	Member of the U.S. House of Representatives from Massachusetts's 10th congressional district 1859–1863	Succeeded by Henry L. Dawes
