= Charlotte Taylor Blow Charless =

American charity worker (1810–1905)

Charlotte Taylor Blow Charless (1810–1905) founded the Home of the Friendless in St. Louis, Missouri in 1853 for elderly, indigent women who could no longer work and care for themselves. Renamed The Charless Home in 1977, the institution celebrated its 150th anniversary in 2003 and continues to provide housing and services to retired men (since 1996) as well as women.

Mrs. Charless wrote a biography of her husband, Joseph Charless, Jr. (1804–1859) to extol his exemplary moral and Christian character. Her husband, a prominent merchant and banker, was assassinated in St. Louis by a deranged bookkeeper, Joseph Thornton, who believed that Charless had ruined his character by testifying against him at trial. Thornton, accused of stealing nearly $20,000 from the Boatmen’s Saving Association, was acquitted of theft, but found guilty of murder. Mrs. Charless's biography, written as a series of letters to her grandchildren, was privately printed and published in St. Louis in 1869.

Born in Southampton County, Virginia, Mrs. Charless traveled with her family first to northern Alabama and then, in 1830, to St. Louis, where her father, Peter Blow (1777–1832), briefly operated a hotel. At the time of his death, he or his family sold their slave Dred Scott (c. 1799 – 1858) to Colonel John Emerson, who took Scott to the “free” state of Illinois and territory of Wisconsin. When Scott returned to St. Louis in 1842, he sued for his freedom. Scott found moral and monetary support from Charlotte Charless, her husband and her brothers Henry and Taylor Blow. After Scott's final appeal to the United States Supreme Court failed in 1857, Colonel Emerson's widow, by then married to a leading abolitionist, transferred ownership of Scott to Taylor Blow. Taylor Blow gave Scott his freedom in 1857.

== Sources ==
- Gary Sluyter, St. Louis’ Hidden Treasure, A History of The Charless Home, 1853-2003 (St. Louis, 2003).
- Charlotte Charless, A Biographical Sketch of the Life and Character of Joseph Charless, in a Series of Letters to His Grandchildren (St. Louis, 1869). Text is available at Project Gutenberg.
