= Harriet Jacobs =

African-American abolitionist and writer (d. 1897)

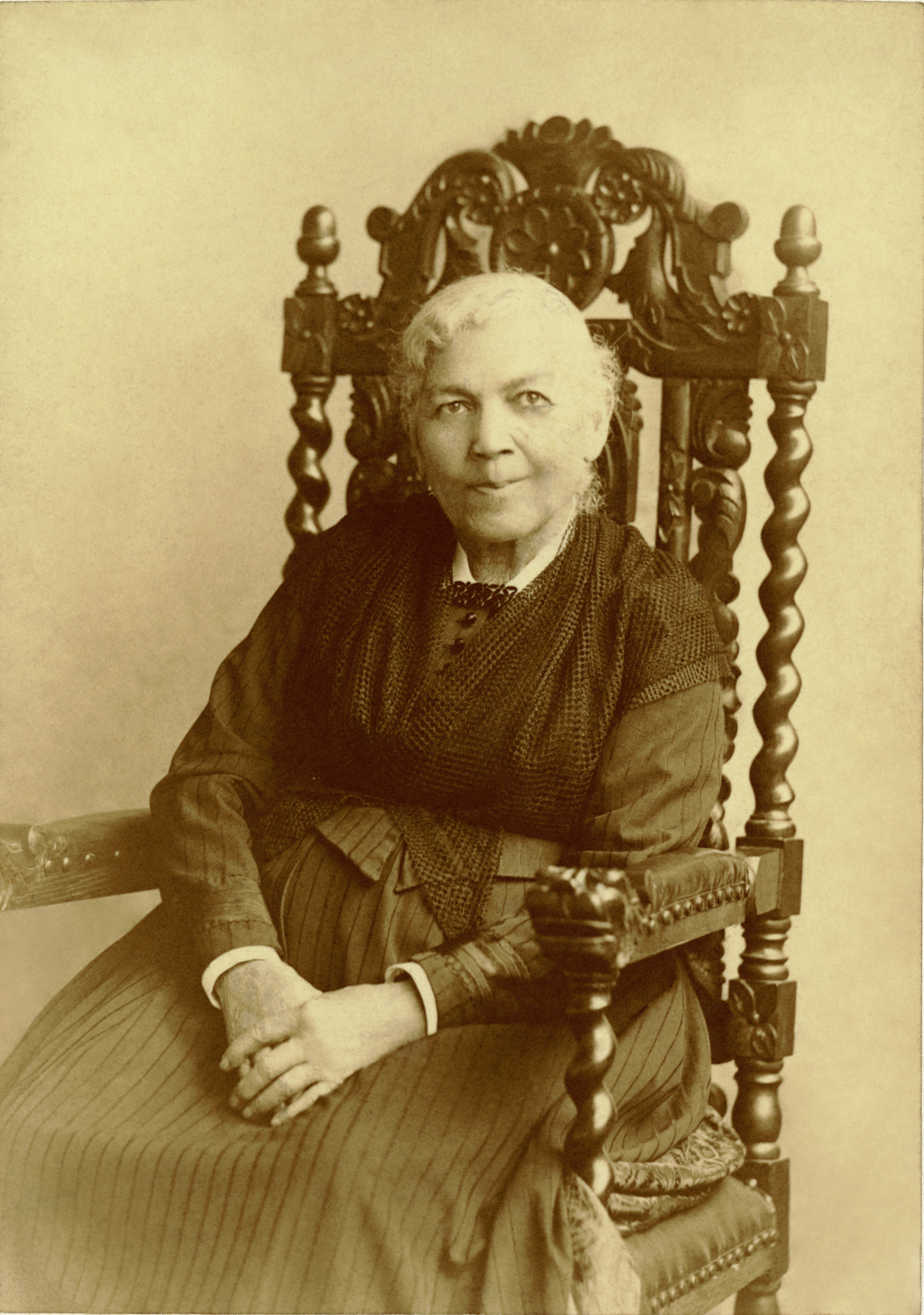
- Jacobs's only known formal photograph, 1894
- Born: 1813 or 1815; Edenton, North Carolina, U.S.
- Died: March 7, 1897 (aged 84); Washington, D.C., U.S.
- Resting place: Mount Auburn Cemetery
- Occupations: Writer; nanny; relief worker
- Children: Joseph and Louisa
- Relatives: John S. Jacobs (brother); William Jacob Knox Jr. (grandnephew); Lawrence H. Knox (grandnephew); Clinton E. Knox (grandnephew)
- Writing career
- Genre: Autobiography
- Notable work: Incidents in the Life of a Slave Girl (1861)

Harriet Jacobs (Note: Many recent editions of her autobiography call her "Harriet A. Jacobs" or "Harriet Ann Jacobs". Her biographer and editor Jean Fagan Yellin uses "Harriet A. Jacobs" on the title page and "Jacobs, Harriet Ann" in the index (p. 330) of her edition of the autobiography. However, in her 2004 biography Harriet Jacobs: A Life, Yellin consistently uses the name "Harriet Jacobs" without any middle name or middle initial. In the index she is listed (on p. 384) as "Jacobs, Harriet". Not a single of the many documents cited in both books has a middle name "Ann". The inscription on the tombstone simply reads "Harriet Jacobs".) (1813 or 1815 (Note: Her biographer Yellin gives 1813 as the year of her birth, without detailing day, month or season. Her tombstone, however, gives February 11, 1815, as the date of her birth (see picture at the end of the article). Mary Maillard, who would in 2017 become the editor of the letters of Jacobs's daughter, argues in favor of 1815 in an article published in 2013. The dates and ages in this article are given according to Yellin.) – March 7, 1897) was an enslaved African-American abolitionist and writer whose autobiography, Incidents in the Life of a Slave Girl, published in 1861 under the pseudonym Linda Brent, is now considered an "American classic".

Born into slavery in Edenton, North Carolina, she was sexually harassed by her enslaver. When he threatened to sell her children if she did not submit to his desire, she hid in a tiny crawl space under the roof of her grandmother's house, so low she could not stand up in it. After staying there for seven years, she finally managed to escape to the free North, where she was reunited with her children Joseph and Louisa Matilda and her brother John S. Jacobs. She found work as a nanny and got into contact with abolitionist and feminist reformers. Even in New York City, her freedom was in danger until her employer was able to pay off her legal owner.

During and immediately after the American Civil War, she travelled to Union-occupied parts of the Confederate South together with her daughter, organizing help and founding two schools for fugitive and freed slaves.

== Biography ==
=== Family and name ===
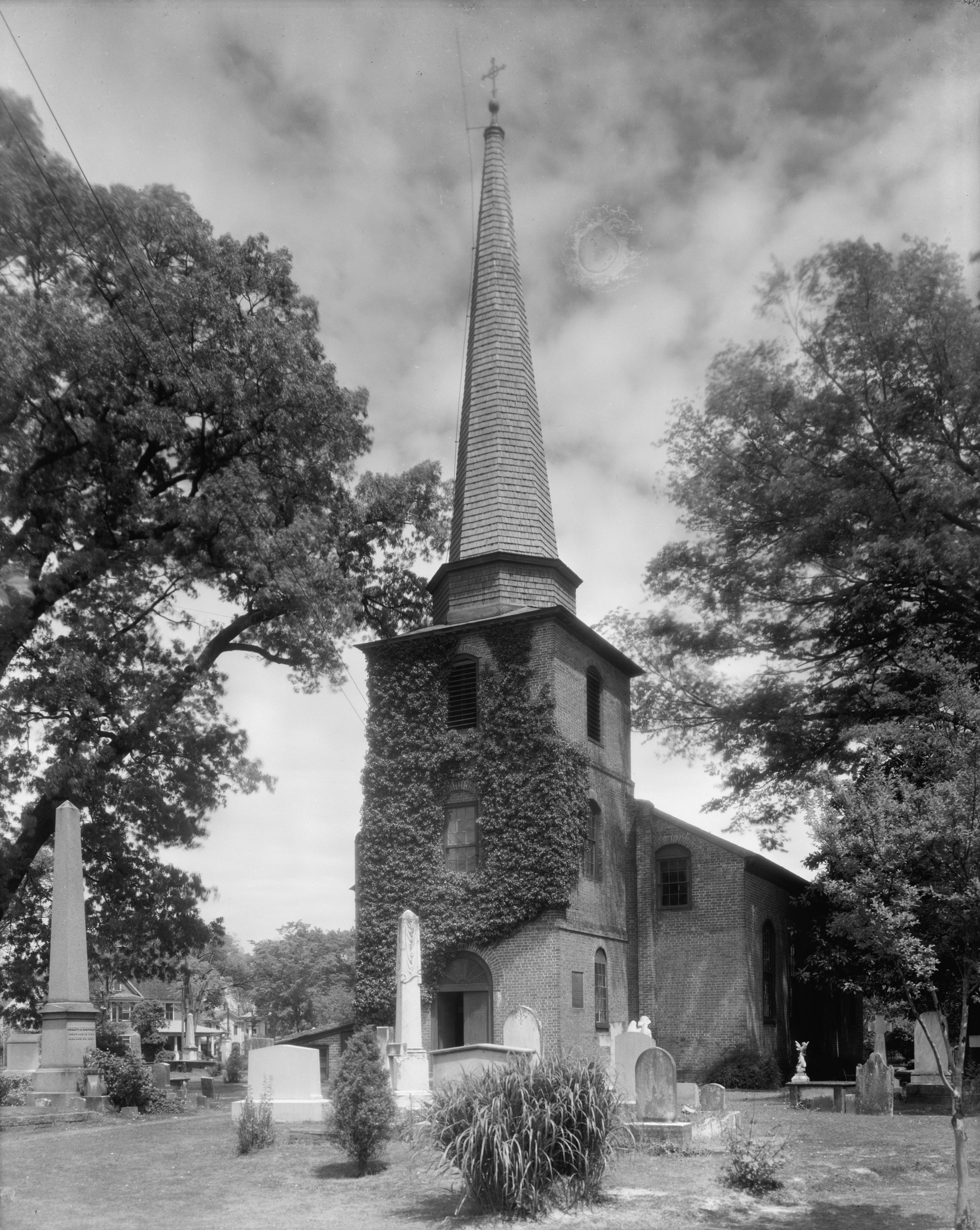
St. Paul's Episcopal Church in Edenton, where Harriet Jacobs and her children were baptized, and where both Dr. Norcom and Molly Horniblow were communicants

Harriet Jacobs was born in 1813 in Edenton, North Carolina, to Delilah Horniblow, enslaved by the Horniblow family who owned a local tavern. (Note: John Horniblow had died in 1799. His widow, Elizabeth Horniblow, continued running the tavern and at first also kept Molly Horniblow and her children as her slaves. She gave Molly's daughter Delilah to her own invalid and unmarried daughter Margaret, who in consequence became the first owner of Delilah's children Harriet and John.) Under the principle of partus sequitur ventrem, both Harriet and her brother John were enslaved at birth by the tavern keeper's family, as a mother's status was passed to her children. Still, according to the same principle, mother and children should have been free, because Molly Horniblow, Delilah's mother, had been freed by her white father, who also was her owner. But she had been kidnapped, and had no chance for legal protection because of her dark skin. Harriet and John's father was Elijah Knox, also enslaved, but enjoying some privileges due to his skill as an expert carpenter. He died in 1826.

While Harriet's mother and grandmother were known by their owner's family name of Horniblow, Harriet used the opportunity of the baptism of her children to register Jacobs as their family name. She and her brother John also used that name after having escaped from slavery. The baptism was conducted without the knowledge of Harriet's master, Norcom. Harriet was convinced that her father should have been called Jacobs because his father was Henry Jacobs, a free white man. After Harriet's mother died, her father married a free African American. The only child from that marriage, Harriet's half brother, was called Elijah after his father and always used Knox as his family name, which was the name of his father's enslaver.

=== Early life in slavery ===
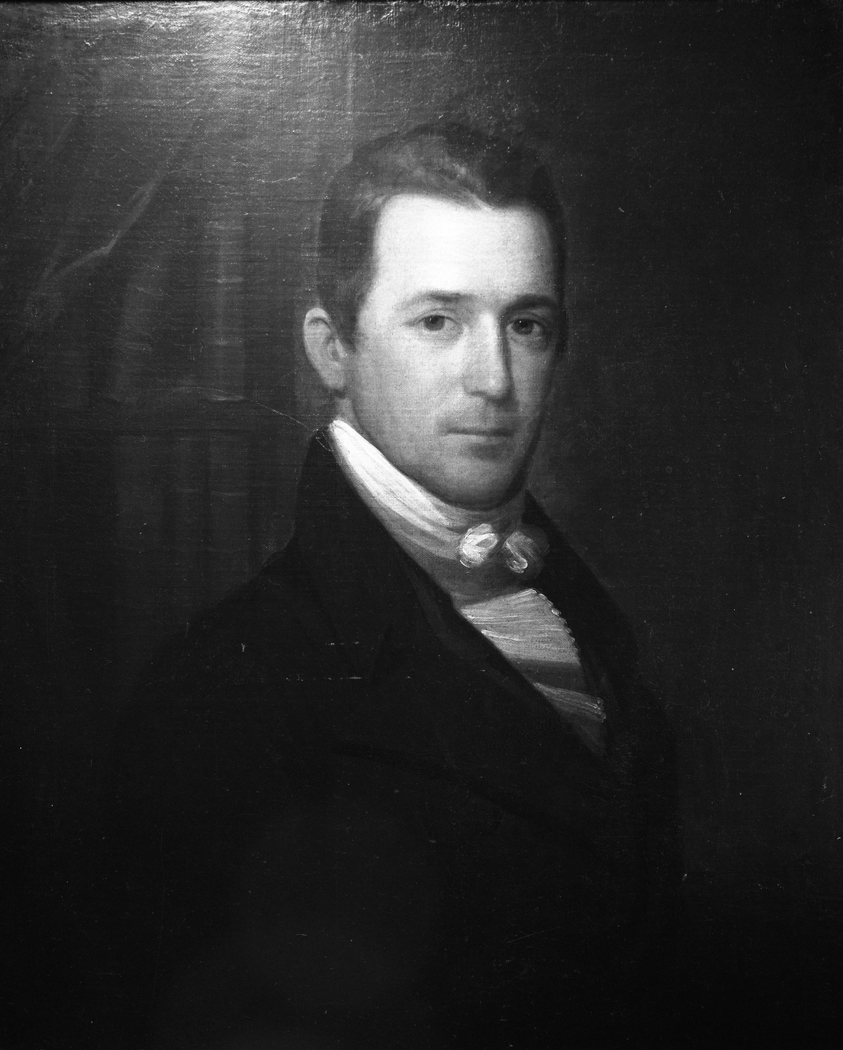
Dr. James Norcom

When Jacobs was six years old, her mother died. She then lived with her owner, a daughter of the deceased tavern keeper, who taught her not only to sew, but also to read and write. Very few slaves were literate, although it was only in 1830 that North Carolina explicitly outlawed teaching slaves to read or write. Although Harriet's brother John succeeded in teaching himself to read, he still was not able to write when he escaped from slavery as a young adult.

In 1825, the owner of Harriet and John Jacobs died. She willed Harriet to her three-year-old niece Mary Matilda Norcom. (Note: Three months before she died in 1825, Jacobs' mistress Margaret Horniblow had signed a will leaving her slaves to her mother. Dr. James Norcom and a man named Henry Flury witnessed a later codicil to the will directing that the girl Harriet be left to Norcom's daughter Mary Matilda. The codicil was not signed by Margaret Horniblow.) Mary Matilda's father, the physician Dr. James Norcom (son-in-law of the deceased tavern keeper), became her de facto master. Most of the property, including her brother John, was inherited by the tavern keeper's widow. Dr. Norcom hired John, and the Jacobs siblings lived together in his household. Following the death of the widow, her slaves were sold at the New Year's Day auction, 1828. Among them were Harriet's brother John, her grandmother Molly Horniblow and Molly's son Mark. Being sold at public auction was a traumatic experience for twelve-year old John. Friends of hers bought Molly Horniblow and Mark with money Molly had been working hard to save over the many years of her servitude at the tavern. Afterwards Molly Horniblow was set free, and her own son Mark became her slave. Because of legal restrictions on manumission, Mark had to remain his mother's slave until in 1847 or 1848 she finally succeeded in freeing him. John Jacobs was bought by Dr. Norcom, thus he and his sister stayed together.

The same year, 1828, Molly Horniblow's youngest son, Joseph, tried to escape. He was caught, paraded in chains through Edenton, put into jail, and finally sold to New Orleans. The family later learned that he escaped again and reached New York. After that he was lost to the family. The Jacobs siblings, who, even as children, were talking about escaping to freedom, saw him as a hero. Both of them would later name their sons for him.

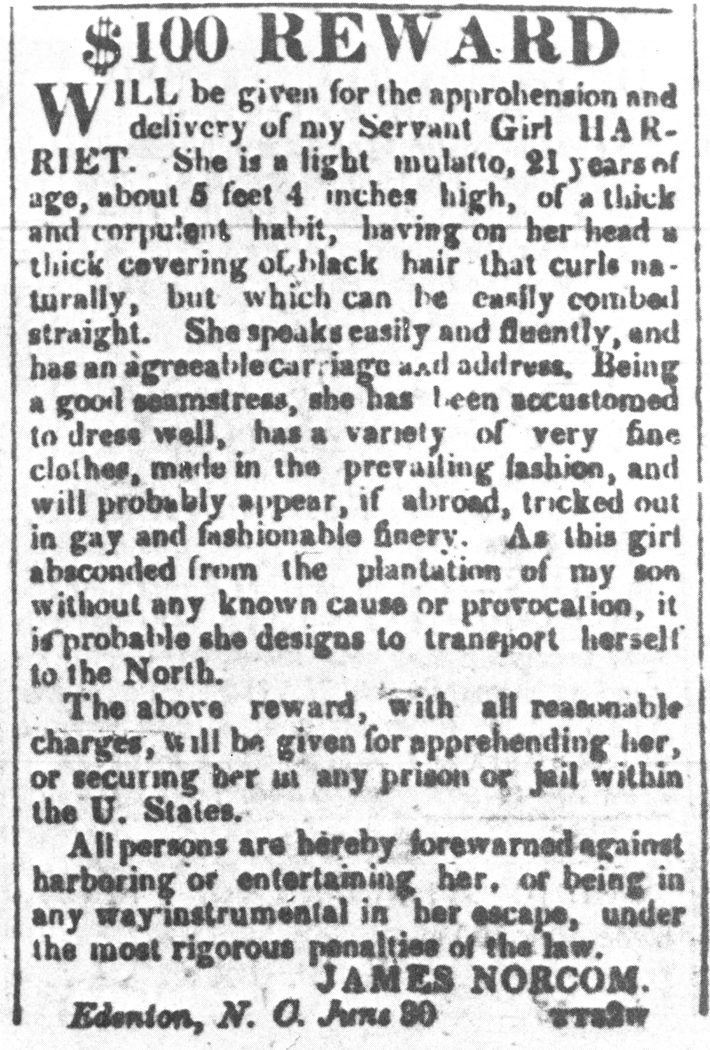
Reward notice issued for the return of Harriet Jacobs

=== Coping with sexual harassment ===
Norcom soon started harassing Jacobs sexually, causing the jealousy of his wife. When Jacobs fell in love with a free black man who wanted to buy her freedom and marry her, Norcom intervened and forbade her to continue with the relationship. Hoping for protection from Norcom's harassment, Jacobs started a relationship with Samuel Sawyer, a white lawyer and member of North Carolina's white elite, who would some years later be elected to the House of Representatives. Sawyer became the father of Jacobs's only children, Joseph (born 1829/30) and Louisa Matilda (born 1832/33). When she learned of Jacobs's pregnancy, Mrs. Norcom forbade her to return to her house, which enabled Jacobs to live with her grandmother. Still, Norcom continued his harassment during his numerous visits there; the distance as the crow flies between the two houses was only 600 feet (180 m).

=== Seven years concealed ===
In April 1835, Norcom finally moved Jacobs from her grandmother's to the plantation of his son, some 6 miles (10 km) away. He also threatened to expose her children to the hard life of the plantation slaves and to sell them, separately and without the mother, after some time. In June 1835, Harriet Jacobs decided to escape. A white woman, who was a slaveholder herself, hid her at great personal risk in her house. After a short time, Jacobs had to hide in a swamp near the town, and at last she found refuge in a "tiny crawlspace" under the roof of her grandmother's house. The "garret" was only 9 feet (3 m) by 7 feet (2 m) and 3 feet (1 m) at its highest point. The impossibility of bodily exercise caused health problems which she still felt while writing her autobiography many years later. She bored a series of small holes into the wall, thus creating an opening approximately an inch square that allowed fresh air and some light to enter and that allowed her to see out. The light was barely sufficient to sew and to read the Bible and newspapers.

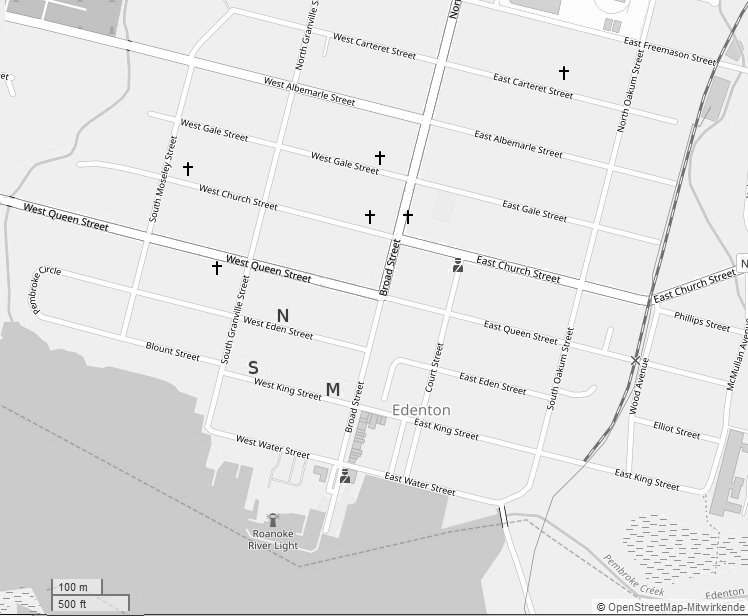
Map of the town center of Edenton. Norcom's house is marked N, Sawyer's S, and Molly Horniblow's M. (Note: The map shows the situation in 2019, but the streets are the same as during the 1830s, also having the same names, only that "East" and "West" have been added since then.)

Norcom reacted by selling Jacobs's children and her brother John to a slave trader demanding that they should be sold in a different state, thus expecting to separate them forever from their mother and sister. However, the trader was secretly in league with Sawyer, to whom he sold all three of them, thus frustrating Norcom's plan for revenge. In her autobiography, Jacobs accuses Sawyer of not having kept his promise to legally manumit their children. Still, Sawyer allowed his enslaved children to live with their great-grandmother Molly Horniblow. After Sawyer married in 1838, Jacobs asked her grandmother to remind him of his promise. He asked and obtained Jacobs's approval to send their daughter to live with his cousin in Brooklyn, New York, where slavery had already been abolished. He also suggested sending their son to the Free States. While locked in her cell, Jacobs could often observe her unsuspecting children. (Note: The headline of this section is taken from the subtitle which Jacobs had once intended to give to her work and which her friend William C. Nell used when advertising the autobiography in Garrison's The Liberator: "LINDA: Incidents in the Life of a Slave Girl, seven years concealed in Slavery".)

=== Escape and freedom ===
In 1842, Jacobs finally got a chance to escape by boat to Philadelphia, where she was aided by anti-slavery activists of the Philadelphia Vigilant Committee. After a short stay, she continued to New York City. Although she had no references, Mary Stace Willis, the wife of the then extremely popular author Nathaniel Parker Willis, hired Jacobs as a nanny for her baby daughter Imogen. The two women agreed on a trial period of one week, not suspecting that the relationship between the two families would last into the next generation, until the death of Louisa Matilda Jacobs at the home of Edith Willis Grinnell, the daughter of Nathaniel Willis and his second wife, in 1917.

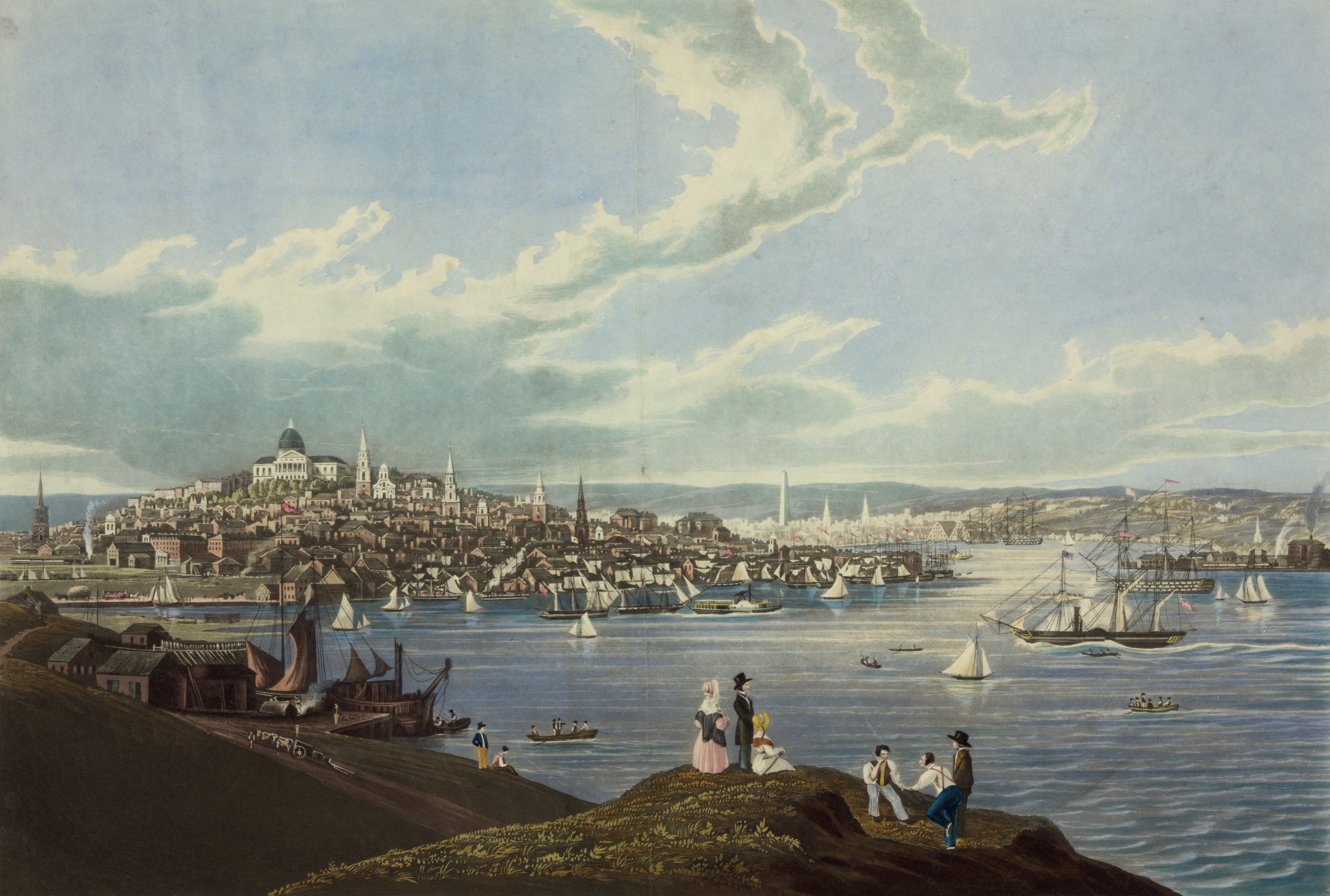
Boston in 1841

In 1843 Jacobs heard that Norcom was on his way to New York to force her back into slavery, which was legal for him to do everywhere inside the United States. She asked Mary Willis for a leave of two weeks and went to her brother John in Boston. John Jacobs, in his capacity as personal servant, had accompanied his owner Sawyer on his marriage trip through the North in 1838. He had gained his freedom by leaving his master in New York. After that he had gone whaling and had been absent for more than three years. From Boston, Harriet Jacobs wrote to her grandmother asking her to send Joseph there, so that he could live there with his uncle John. After Joseph's arrival, she returned to her work as Imogen Willis's nanny. Her work with the Willis family came to an abrupt end in October 1843, when Jacobs learned that her whereabouts had been betrayed to Norcom. Again, she had to flee to Boston, where the strength of the abolitionist movement guaranteed a certain level of security. Moving to Boston also gave her the opportunity to take her daughter Louisa Matilda from the house of Sawyer's cousin in Brooklyn, where she had been treated not much better than a slave.

In Boston Jacobs took on odd jobs. Her stay there was interrupted by the death of Mary Stace Willis in March 1845. Nathaniel Willis took his daughter Imogen on a ten-month visit to the family of his deceased wife in England. For the journey, Jacobs resumed her job as nanny. For several months, she stayed together with Imogen in the vicarage at Steventon, the home of Mary Stace Willis's sister and her husband Reverend William Vincent, while Willis went to London and to the Continent. In her autobiography, she reflects on her experiences during the journey: She did not notice any sign of racism, which often embittered her life in the US. As a consequence of this, she gained a new access to her Christian faith. At home, Christian ministers treating Black people with contempt, or even buying and selling slaves, had been an obstacle to her spiritual life.

=== The autobiography ===
==== Background: Abolitionism and early feminism ====
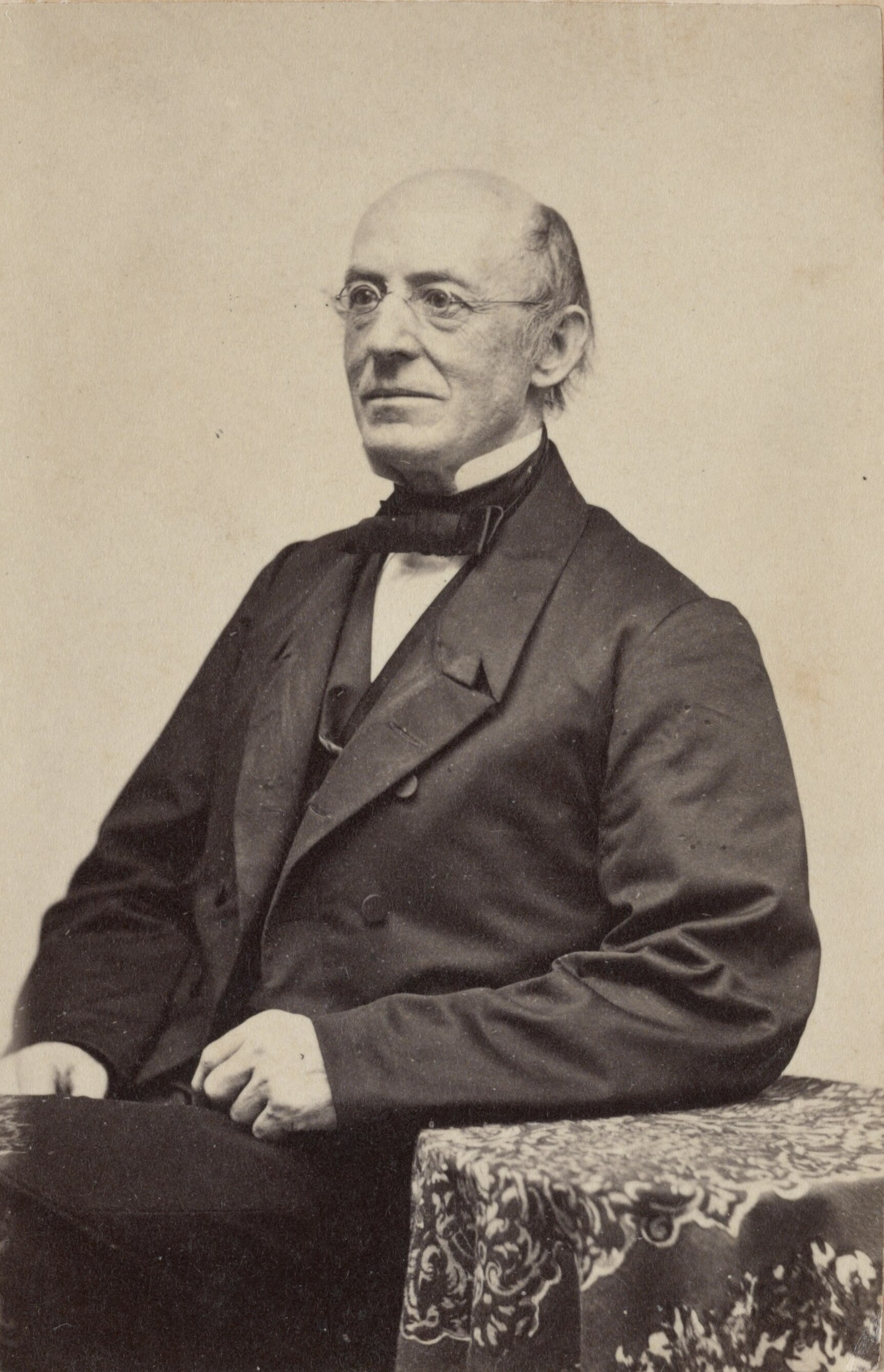
William Lloyd Garrison

John S. Jacobs got more and more involved with abolitionism, i. e. the anti-slavery movement led by William Lloyd Garrison. He undertook several lecture tours, either alone or with fellow abolitionists, among them Frederick Douglass, three years his junior. In 1849, John S. Jacobs took responsibility for the Anti-Slavery Office and Reading Room in Rochester, New York. His sister Harriet supported him, having been relieved of the daily care for her children (Joseph had left the Boston print shop where his mother had apprenticed him after suffering from racist abuse and had gone on a whaling voyage while his mother had been in England, and Louisa had been sent to a boarding school).

The former "slave girl" who had never been to school, and whose life had mostly been confined by the struggle for her own survival in dignity and that of her children, now found herself in circles that were about to change America through their ideas, then considered radical. The Reading Room was in the same building as the newspaper The North Star, run by Frederick Douglass, who today is considered the most influential African American of his century. Jacobs lived at the house of the white couple Amy and Isaac Post. Douglass and the Posts were staunch enemies of slavery and racism, and supporters of women's suffrage. The year before, Douglass and Amy Post had attended the Seneca Falls Convention, the world's first convention on women's rights, and had signed the Declaration of Sentiments, which demanded equal rights for women.

==== Obtaining legal freedom ====
In 1850, Jacobs paid a visit to Nathaniel Parker Willis in New York, wanting to see the now eight-years old Imogen again. Willis's second wife, Cornelia Grinnell Willis, who had not recovered well after the birth of her second child, prevailed upon Jacobs once again to become the nanny of the Willis children. Knowing that this involved a considerable risk for Jacobs, especially since the Fugitive Slave Law of 1850 had made it much easier for slaveholders to reclaim their fugitive "chattels", she gave her word to John S. Jacobs that she would not let his sister fall into the hands of her persecutors.

In the spring of 1851, Jacobs was again informed that she was in danger of being recaptured. Cornelia Willis sent Jacobs together with Willis's one-year-old daughter Lilian to Massachusetts, which was comparatively safe. Jacobs, in whose autobiography the constant danger for herself and other enslaved mothers of being separated from their children is an important theme, spoke to her employer of the sacrifice that letting go of her baby daughter meant to her. Cornelia Willis answered by explaining that the slave catchers would have to return the baby to the mother, if Jacobs should be caught. She would then try to rescue Jacobs.

In February 1852, Jacobs read in the newspaper that her legal owner, the daughter of the recently deceased Norcom, had arrived at a New York Hotel together with her husband, obviously intending to re-claim their fugitive slave. Again, Cornelia Willis sent Jacobs to Massachusetts together with Lilian. Some days later, she wrote a letter to Jacobs informing her of her intention to buy Jacobs's freedom. Jacobs replied that she preferred to join her brother who had gone to California. Regardless, Cornelia Willis bought her freedom for $300. In her autobiography, Jacobs describes her mixed feelings: Bitterness at the thought that "a human being [was] sold in the free city of New York", happiness at the thought that her freedom was secured, and "love" and "gratitude" for Cornelia Willis.

==== Obstacles: Trauma and shame ====
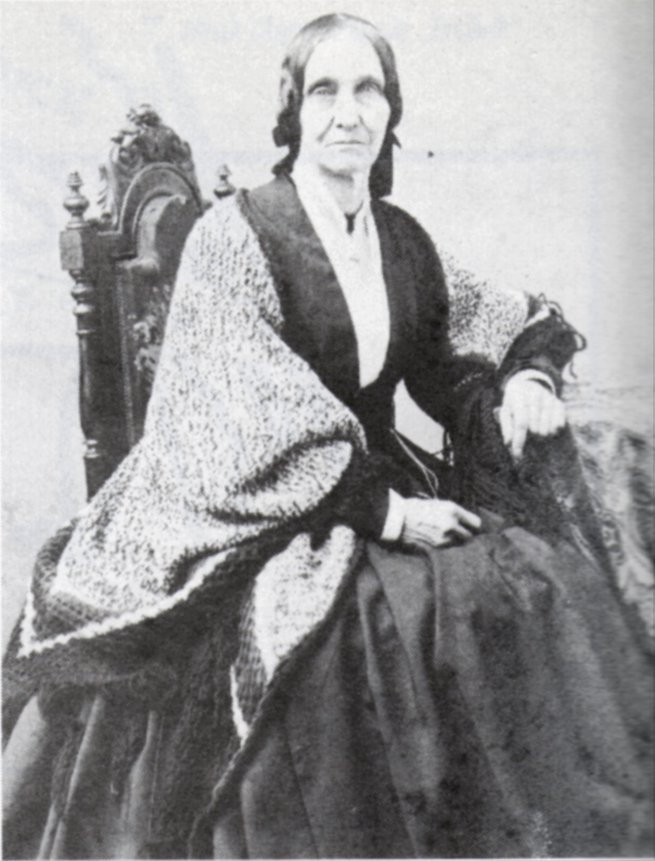
Amy Post in the 1860s

The Posts were the first white people Jacobs had met since her return from England who did not look down on her color. Soon, she developed enough trust in Amy Post to be able to tell her her story which she had kept secret for so long. Post later described how difficult it was for Jacobs to tell of her traumatic experiences: "Though impelled by a natural craving for human sympathy, she passed through a baptism of suffering, even in recounting her trials to me. ... The burden of these memories lay heavily on her spirit".

In late 1852 or early 1853, Amy Post suggested that Jacobs should write her life story. Jacobs's brother had for some time been urging her to do so, and she felt a moral obligation to tell her story to help build public support for the antislavery cause and thus save others from suffering a similar fate.

Still, Jacobs had acted against moral ideas commonly shared in her time, including by herself, by consenting to a sexual relationship with Sawyer. The shame caused by this memory and the resulting fear of having to tell her story had been the reason for her initially avoiding contact with the abolitionist movement her brother John had joined in the 1840s. Finally, Jacobs overcame her trauma and feeling of shame, and she consented to publish her story. Her reply to Post describing her internal struggle has survived.

==== Writing of the manuscript ====
At first, Jacobs did not feel that she was up to writing a book. She wrote a short outline of her story and asked Amy Post to send it to Harriet Beecher Stowe, proposing to tell her story to Stowe so that Stowe could transform it into a book. Before Stowe's answer arrived, Jacobs read in the papers that the famous author, whose novel Uncle Tom's Cabin, published in 1852, had become an instant bestseller, was going to England. Jacobs then asked Cornelia Willis to propose to Stowe that Jacobs's daughter Louisa accompany her to England and tell the story during the journey. In reply, Stowe forwarded the story outline to Willis and declined to let Louisa join her, citing the possibility of Louisa being spoiled by too much sympathy shown to her in England. Jacobs felt betrayed because her employer thus came to know about the parentage of her children, which was the cause for Jacobs feeling ashamed. In a letter to Post, she analyzed the racist thinking behind Stowe's remark on Louisa with bitter irony: "what a pity we poor blacks can[']t have the firmness and stability of character that you white people have." In consequence, Jacobs gave up the idea of enlisting Stowe's help.

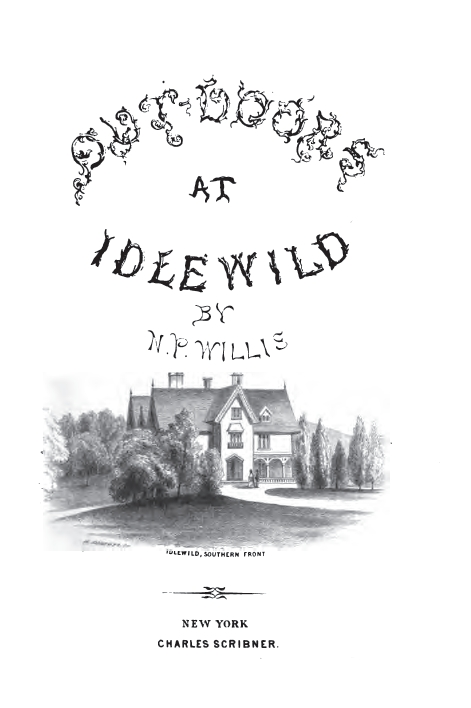
Title page of Willis's book Out-doors at Idlewild (1855), presenting a southern view of the residence

In June 1853, Jacobs chanced to read a defense of slavery entitled "The Women of England vs. the Women of America" in an old newspaper. Written by Julia Tyler, wife of former president John Tyler, the text claimed that the household slaves were "well clothed and happy". Jacobs spent the whole night writing a reply, which she sent to the New York Tribune. Her letter, signed "A Fugitive Slave", published on June 21, was her first text to be printed. Her biographer, Jean Fagan Yellin, comments, "When the letter was printed ..., an author was born."

In October 1853, she wrote to Amy Post that she had decided to become the author of her own story. In the same letter, only a few lines earlier, she had informed Post of her grandmother's death. (Note: The date of Molly Horniblow's burial in Edenton was September 4, 1853.) Yellin concludes that the "death of her revered grandmother" made it possible for Jacobs to "reveal her troubled sexual history" which she could never have done "while her proud, judgmental grandmother lived."

While using the little spare time a children's nurse had to write her story, Jacobs lived with the Willis family at Idlewild, their new country residence. With N.P.Willis being largely forgotten today, Yellin comments on the irony of the situation: "Idlewild had been conceived as a famous writer's retreat, but its owner never imagined that it was his children's nurse who would create an American classic there".

Louisa copied the manuscript, standardizing orthography and punctuation. Yellin observes that both style and content are "completely consistent" with the rest of Jacobs's writing and states, "there is no evidence to suggest that Louisa Matilda had any significant impact on either the subject matter or the style of the book."

When, by mid-1857, her work was finally nearing completion, she asked Amy Post for a preface. Even in this letter she mentions the shame that made writing her story difficult for herself: "as much pleasure as it would afford me and as great an honor as I would deem it to have your name associated with my Book –Yet believe me dear friend[,] there are many painful things in it – that make me shrink from asking the sacrifice from one so good and pure as your self–."

==== Searching for a publisher ====
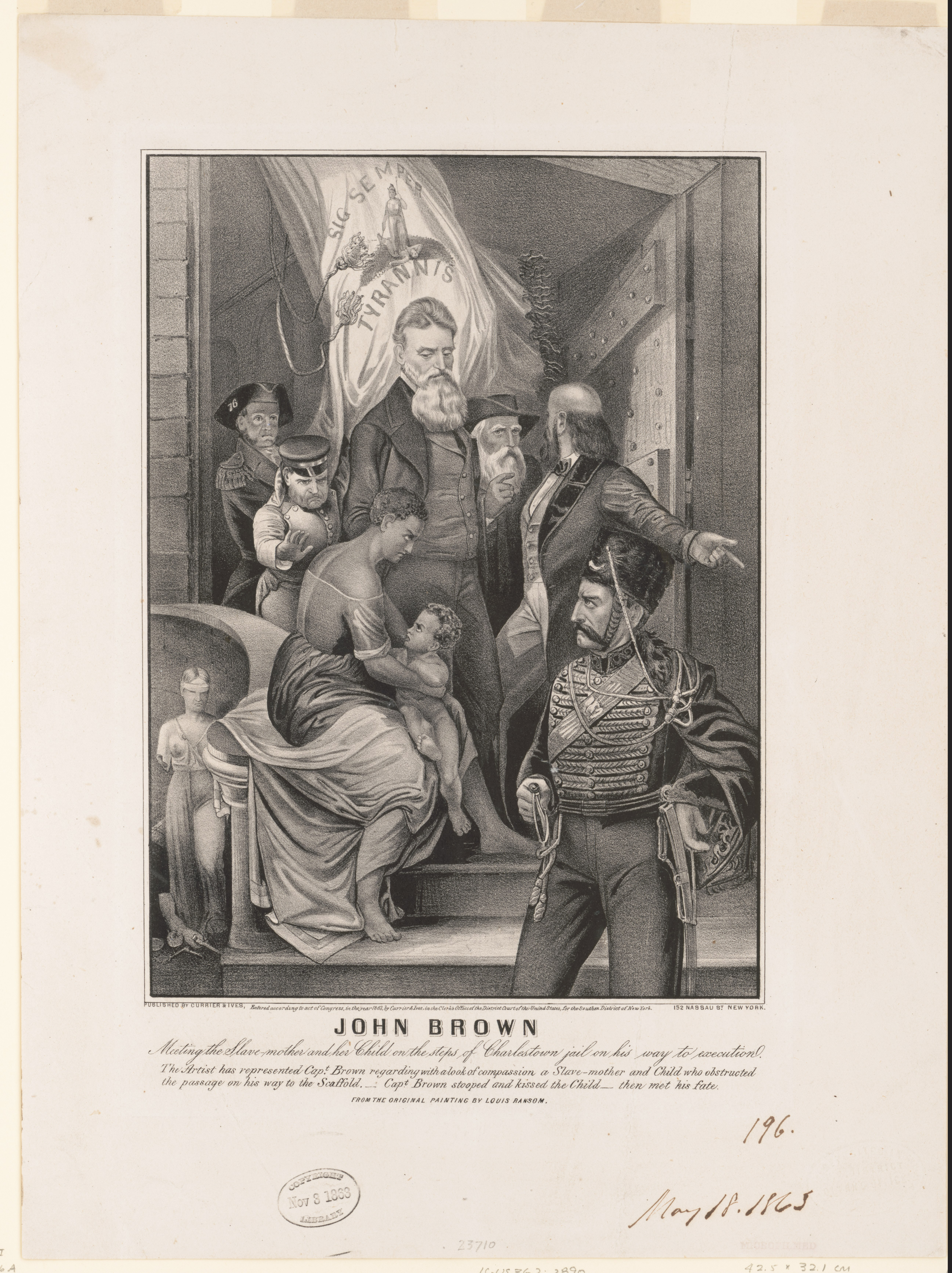
Abolitionist drawing of a scene that probably never happened: John Brown meets an enslaved mother and her child while being led to execution

In May 1858, Harriet Jacobs sailed to England, hoping to find a publisher there. She carried good letters of introduction, but was not able to get her manuscript into print. The reasons for her failure are not clear. Yellin supposes that her contacts among the British abolitionists feared that the story of her liaison with Sawyer would be too much for Victorian Britain's prudery. Disheartened, Jacobs returned to her work at Idlewild and made no further efforts to publish her book until the fall of 1859.

On October 16, 1859, the anti-slavery activist John Brown tried to incite a slave rebellion at Harper's Ferry. Brown, who was executed in December, was considered a martyr and hero by many abolitionists, among them Harriet Jacobs, who added a tribute to Brown as the final chapter to her manuscript. She then sent the manuscript to publishers Phillips and Samson in Boston. They were ready to publish it under the condition that either Nathaniel Parker Willis or Harriet Beecher Stowe would supply a preface. Jacobs was unwilling to ask Willis, who held pro-slavery views, but she asked Stowe, who declined. Soon after, the publishers failed, thus frustrating Jacobs's second attempt to get her story printed.

==== Lydia Maria Child as the book's editor ====
Jacobs now contacted Thayer and Eldridge, who had recently published a sympathizing biography of John Brown. Thayer and Eldridge demanded a preface by Lydia Maria Child. Jacobs confessed to Amy Post, that after suffering another rejection from Stowe, she could hardly bring herself to asking another famous writer, but she "resolved to make my last effort".

Jacobs met Child in Boston, and Child not only agreed to write a preface, but also to become the editor of the book. Child then re-arranged the material according to a more chronological order. She also suggested dropping the final chapter on Brown and adding more information on the anti-black violence which occurred in Edenton after Nat Turner's 1831 rebellion. She kept contact with Jacobs via mail, but the two women failed to meet a second time during the editing process, because with Cornelia Willis passing through a dangerous pregnancy and premature birth Jacobs was not able to leave Idlewild.

After the book had been stereotyped, Thayer and Eldridge, too, failed. Jacobs succeeded in buying the stereotype plates and to get the book printed and bound.

In January 1861, nearly four years after she had finished the manuscript, Jacobs's Incidents in the Life of a Slave Girl finally appeared before the public. The next month, an abridged and censored version of her brother John S. Jacob's own memoir, entitled A True Tale of Slavery, was published in London (in 1855 the original version had been published in full by a progressive newspaper in Sydney, Australia, as The United States Governed by Six Hundred Thousand Despots: A True Story of Slavery). Both siblings relate in their respective narratives their own experiences, experiences made together, and episodes in the life of the other sibling.

In her book, Harriet Jacobs does not mention the town or even the state, where she was held as a slave, and changes all personal names, given names as well as family names, with the only exception of the Post couple, whose names are given correctly. However, John Jacobs (called "William" in his sister's book) mentions Edenton as his birthplace and uses the correct given names, but abbreviates most family names. So Dr. Norcom is "Dr. Flint" in Harriet's book, but "Dr. N-" in John's. An author's name is not given on the title page, but the "Preface by the author" is signed "Linda Brent" and the narrator is called by that name throughout the story.

==== Reception of the book ====
The book was promoted via the abolitionist networks and was well received by the critics. Jacobs arranged for a publication in Great Britain, which was published in the first months of 1862, soon followed by a pirated edition.

The publication did not cause contempt as Jacobs had feared. On the contrary, Jacobs gained respect. Although she had used a pseudonym, in abolitionist circles she was regularly introduced with words like "Mrs. Jacobs, the author of Linda", thereby conceding her the honorific "Mrs." which normally was reserved for married women. The London Daily News wrote in 1862, that Linda Brent was a true "heroine", giving an example "of endurance and persistency in the struggle for liberty" and "moral rectitude".

=== Civil War and Reconstruction ===
==== Relief work and politics ====
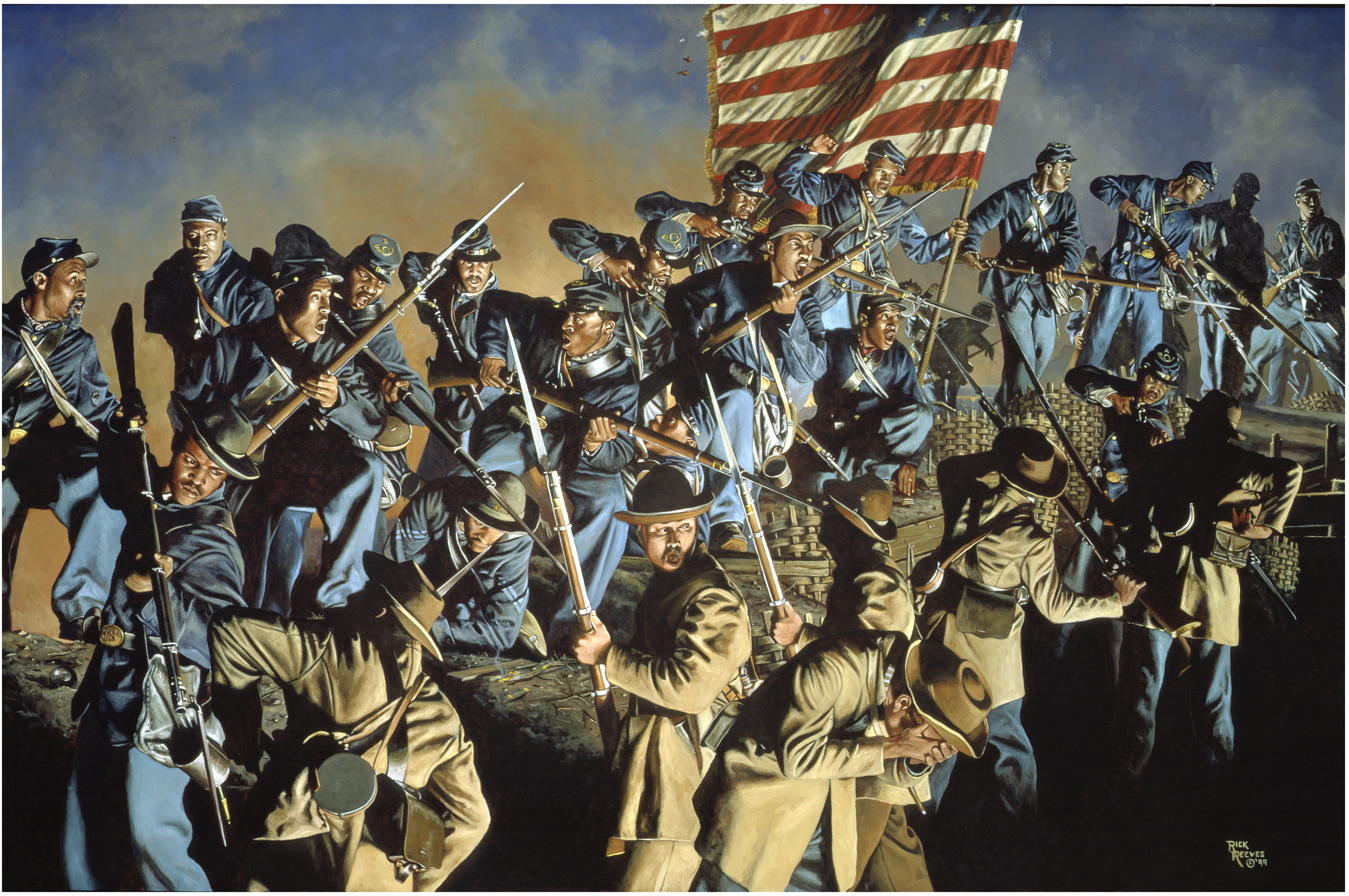
Heroicized painting of the famous assault on Fort Wagner by the 54th Massachusetts, July 1863

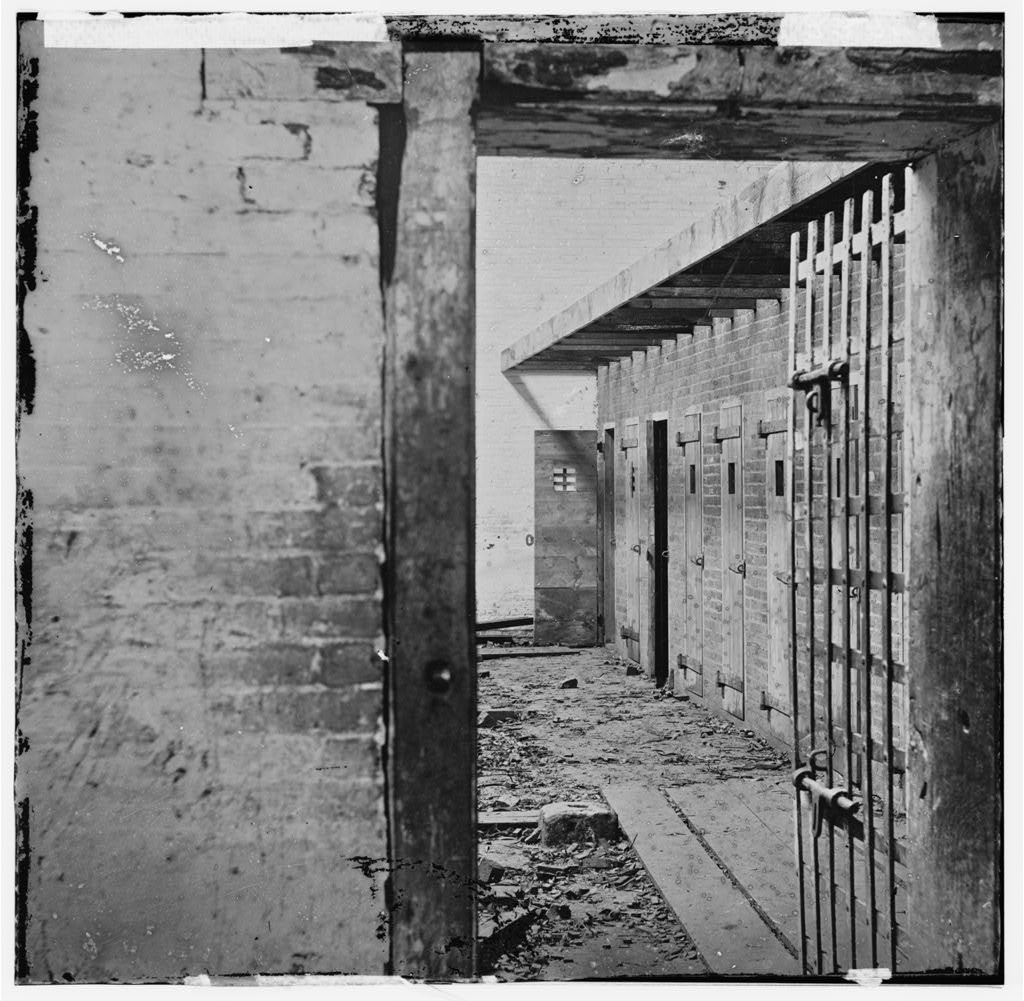
Slave pen of an unnamed trader in Alexandria, Virginia. Photograph from the 1860s. Jacobs describes her visit to Birch's (formerly Franklin and Armfield's) slave pen in her report Life among the Contrabands.

After the election of president Lincoln in November 1860, the slavery question caused first the secession of most slave states and then the Civil War. Thousands of African Americans, having escaped from slavery in the South, gathered just north of the front. Since Lincoln's administration continued to regard them as their masters' property, these refugees were in most cases declared "contraband of war" and simply called "Contrabands". Many of them found refuge in makeshift camps, suffering and dying from want of the most basic necessities. Originally, Jacobs had planned to follow the example her brother John S. had set nearly two decades ago and become an abolitionist speaker, but now she saw that helping the Contrabands would mean rendering her race a service more urgently needed.

In the spring of 1862, Harriet Jacobs went to Washington, D.C. and neighboring Alexandria, Virginia. She summarized her experiences during the first months in a report entitled Life among the Contrabands, published in September in Garrison's The Liberator. The author was featured as "Mrs. Jacobs, the author of 'Linda'". This report is a description of the fugitives' misery designed to appeal to donors, but it is also a political denunciation of slavery. Jacobs emphasizes her conviction that the freedmen will be able to build self-determined lives, if they get the necessary support.

During the fall of 1862, she traveled through the North using her popularity as author of Incidents to build up a network to support her relief work. The New York Friends (i.e. the Quakers) gave her credentials as a relief agent.

From January 1863, she made Alexandria the center of her activity. Together with Quaker Julia Wilbur, the teacher, feminist and abolitionist, whom she had already known in Rochester, she was distributing clothes and blankets and at the same time struggling with incompetent, corrupt, or openly racist authorities.

While doing relief work in Alexandria, Jacobs was also involved in the political world. In May 1863 she attended the yearly conference of the New England Anti-Slavery Society in Boston. Together with the other participants she watched the parade of the newly created 54th Massachusetts Infantry Regiment, consisting of black soldiers led by white officers. Since the Lincoln administration had declined to use African American soldiers only a few months past, this was a highly symbolic event. Jacobs expressed her joy and pride in a letter to Lydia Maria Child: "How my heart swelled with the thought that my poor oppressed race were to strike a blow for freedom !"

==== The Jacobs School ====
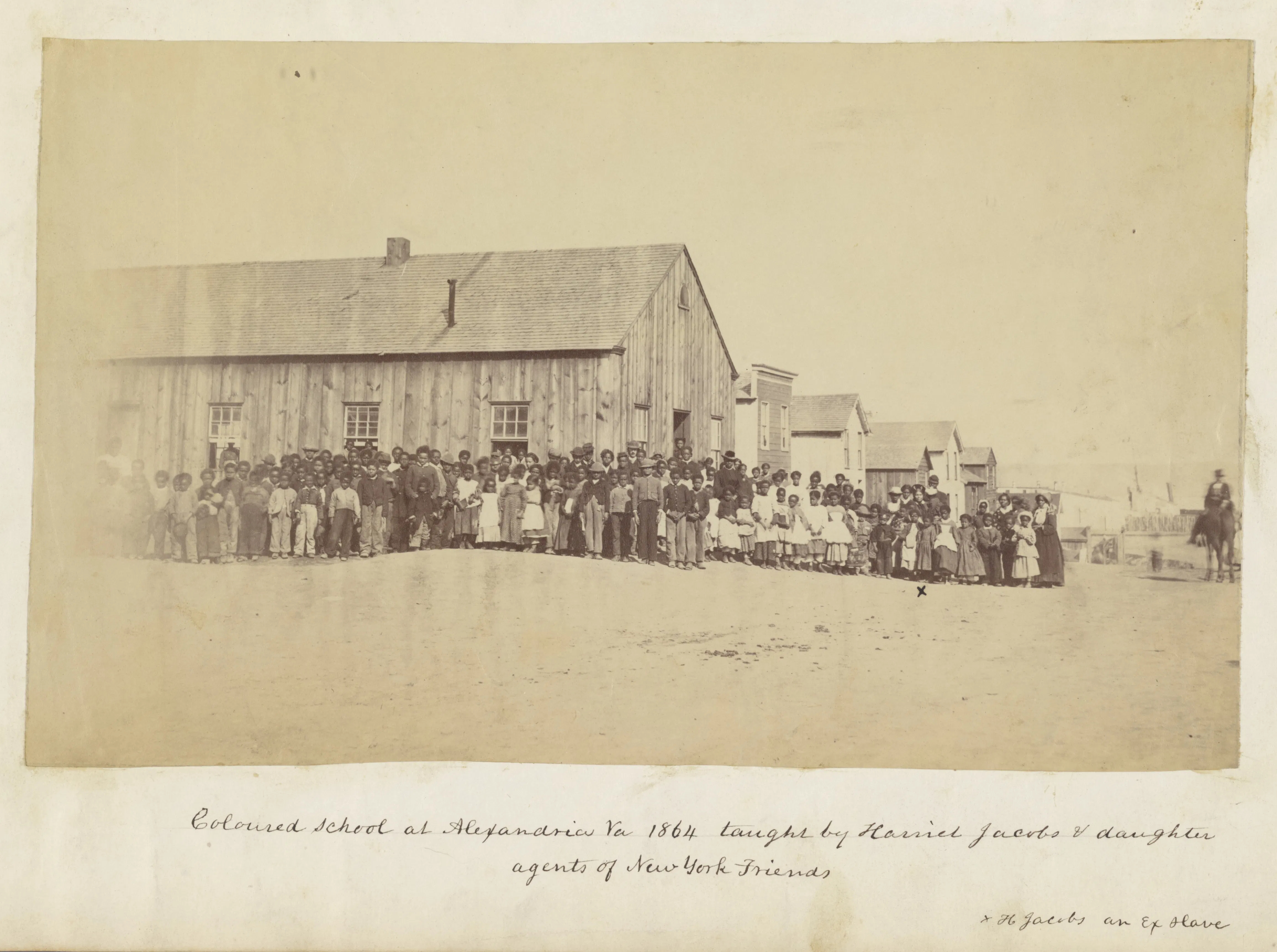
Harriet and Louisa Matilda Jacobs and their students in front of the Jacobs School, Alexandria, Virginia, 1864

In most slave states, teaching slaves to read and write had been forbidden. (Note: Jacobs herself had been taught before North Carolina passed a law to that effect in 1830. Between the introduction of that law and her escape, Jacobs taught an old enslaved Christian who longed to be able to read the Bible only after warning him that if discovered, they would both be whipped.) Virginia had even prohibited teaching these skills to free blacks. After Union troops occupied Alexandria in 1861, some schools for blacks emerged, but there was not a single free school under African American control. Jacobs supported a project conceived by the black community in 1863 to found a new school. In the fall of 1863 her daughter Louisa Matilda who had been trained as a teacher, came to Alexandria in the company of Virginia Lawton, a black friend of the Jacobs family. After some struggle with white missionaries from the North who wanted to take control of the school, the Jacobs School opened in January 1864 under Louisa Matilda's leadership. In the National Anti-Slavery Standard, Harriet Jacobs explained that it was not disapproval of white teachers that made her fight for the school being controlled by the black community. But she wanted to help the former slaves, who had been raised "to look upon the white race as their natural superiors and masters", to develop "respect for their race".

Jacobs's work in Alexandria was recognized on the local as well as on the national level, especially in abolitionist circles. In the spring of 1864 she was elected to the executive committee of the Women's Loyal National League, a women's organization founded in 1863 in response to an appeal by Susan B. Anthony which aimed at collecting signatures for a constitutional amendment to abolish slavery. On August 1, 1864, she delivered the speech on occasion of the celebration of the British West Indian Emancipation (Note: A celebration introduced by the abolitionists in order to demonstrate the backwardness of the US in comparison with the British colonies.) in front of the African American soldiers of a military hospital in Alexandria. Many abolitionists, among them Frederick Douglass, stopped over in Alexandria while touring the South in order to see Jacobs and her work. On a personal level, she found her labors highly rewarding. Already in December 1862 she had written to Amy Post that the preceding six months had been the happiest in her whole life.

==== Relief work with freedmen in Savannah ====
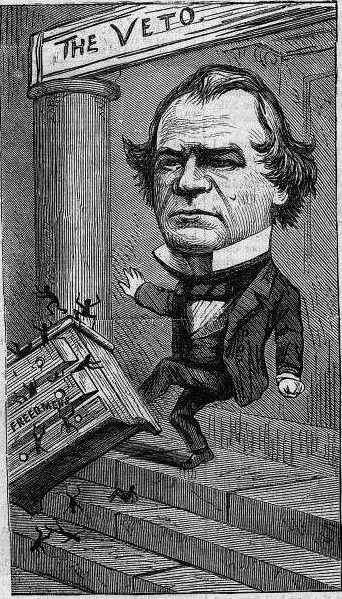
Cartoon of Andrew Johnson, depicting the President disbanding the Freedmen's Bureau

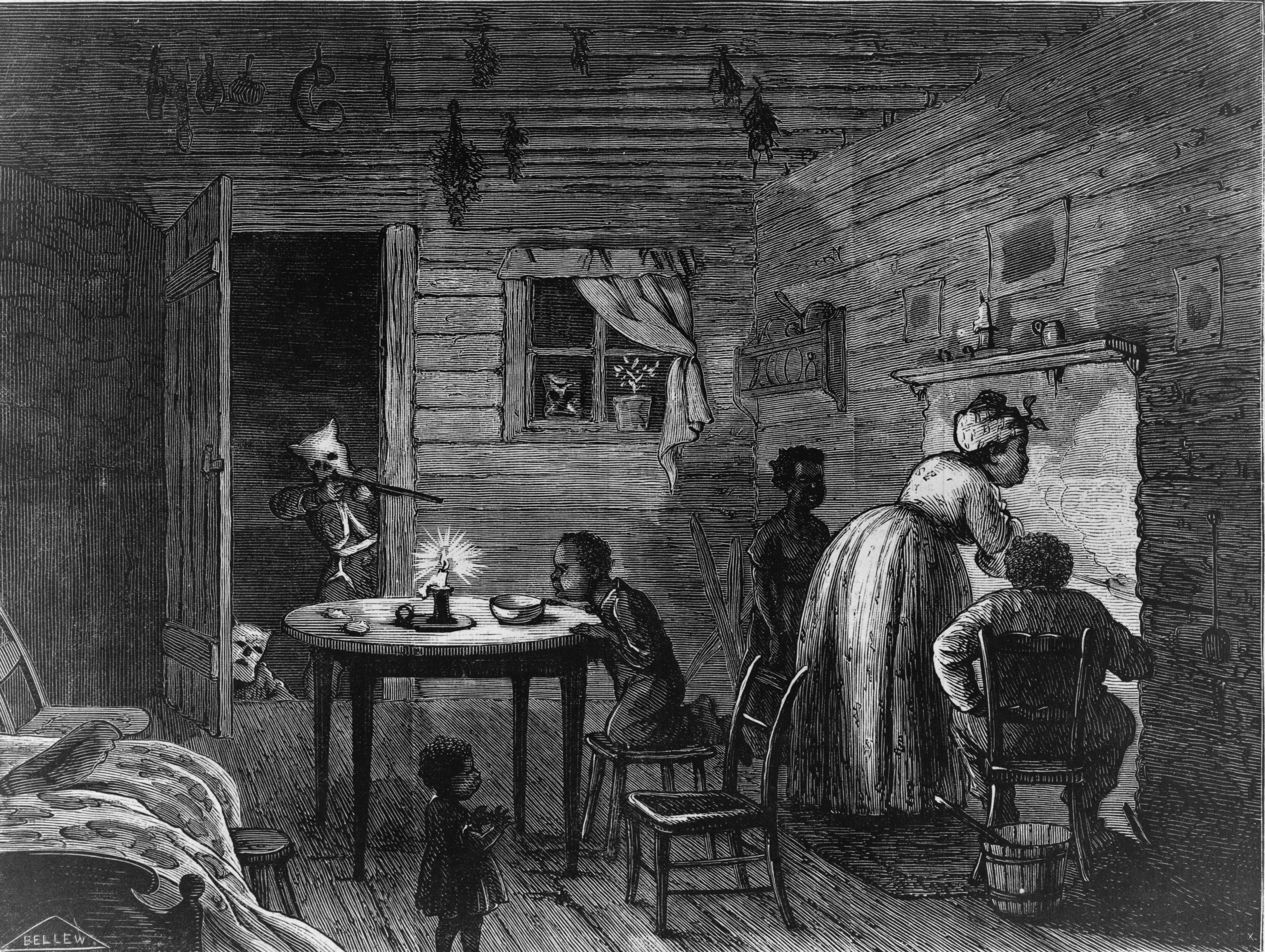
Terror by the Ku-Klux-Klan, engraving published in Harper's Weekly, February 1872

Mother and daughter Jacobs continued their relief work in Alexandria until after the victory of the Union. Convinced that the freedmen in Alexandria were able to care for themselves, they followed the call of the New England Freedmen's Aid Society for teachers to help instruct the freedmen in Georgia. They arrived in Savannah, Georgia in November 1865, only 11 months after the slaves there had been freed by Sherman's March to the Sea. During the following months they distributed clothes, opened a school and were planning to start an orphanage and an asylum for old people.

But the political situation had changed: Lincoln had been assassinated and his successor Andrew Johnson was a Southerner and former slaveholder. He ordered the removal of many freedmen from the land which had been allotted to them by the army just one year before. The land question together with the unjust labor contracts forced on the former slaves by their former enslavers with the help of the army, are an important subject in Jacobs's reports from Georgia.

Already in July 1866, mother and daughter Jacobs left Savannah which was more and more suffering from anti-black violence. Once again, Harriet Jacobs went to Idlewild, to assist Cornelia Willis in caring for her dying husband until his death in January 1867.

In the spring of 1867, she visited the widow of her uncle Mark who was the only survivor of the family still living in Edenton. At the end of the year she undertook her last journey to Great Britain in order to collect money for the projected orphanage and asylum in Savannah. But after her return she had to realize that the anti-black terror in Georgia by the Ku-Klux-Klan and other groups rendered these projects impossible. The money collected was given to the asylum fund of the New York Friends.

In the 1860s a personal tragedy occurred: In the early 1850s, her son Joseph had gone to California to search for gold together with his uncle John. Later the two had continued on to Australia. John S. Jacobs later went to England, while Joseph stayed in Australia. Some time later, no more letters reached Jacobs from Australia. Using her connections to Australian clergymen, Child had an appeal on behalf of her friend read in Australian churches, but to no avail. Jacobs never again heard of her son.

=== Later years and death ===
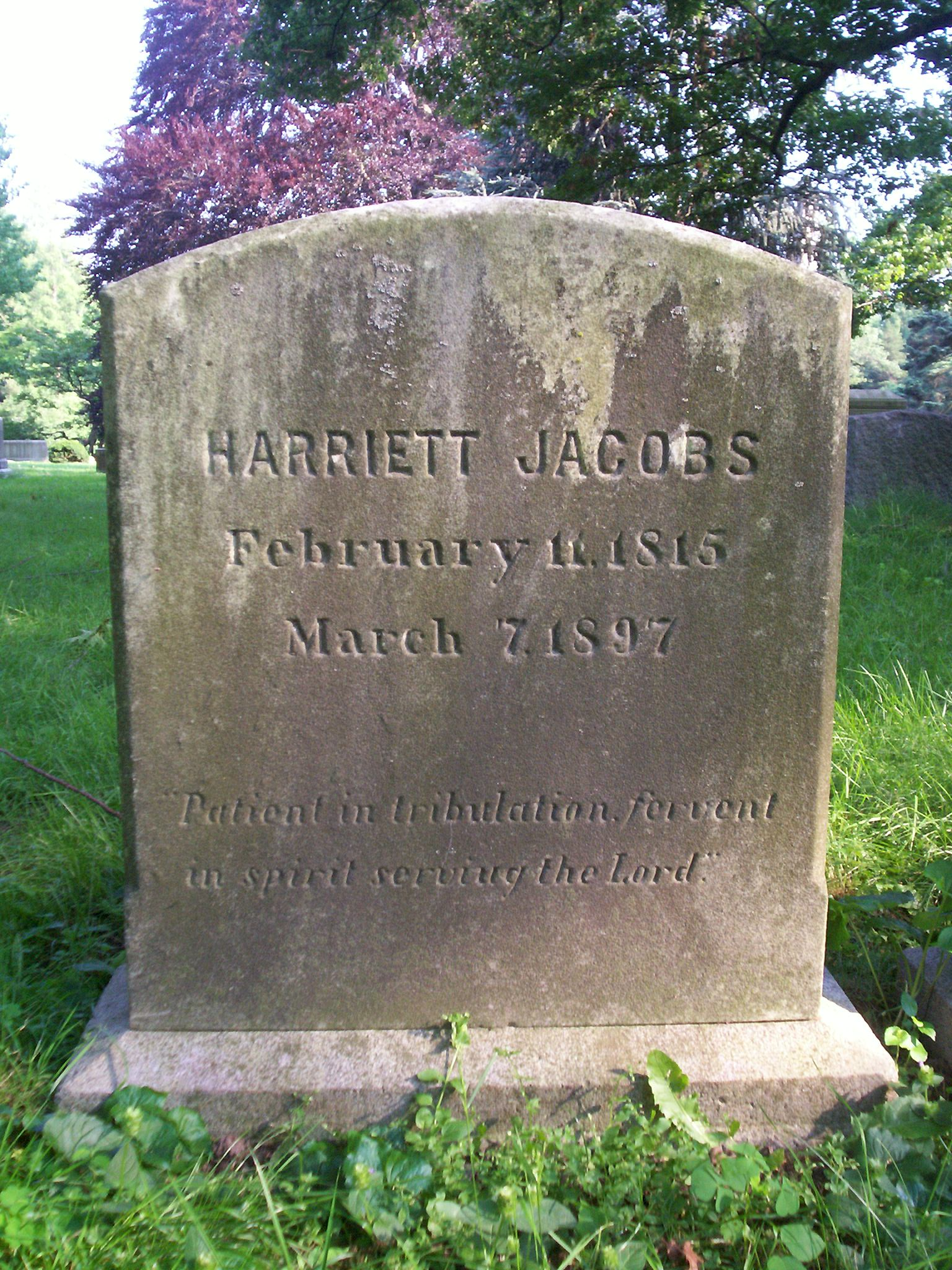
Grave of Harriet Jacobs

After her return from England, Jacobs retired to private life. In Cambridge, Massachusetts, she kept a boarding house together with her daughter. Among her boarders were faculty members of nearby Harvard University. In 1873, her brother John S. returned to the U.S. together with his English wife, their son Joseph and two stepchildren to live close to his sister in Cambridge. He died in December of the same year, 1873. In 1877 Harriet and Louisa Jacobs moved to Washington, D.C., where Louisa hoped to get work as a teacher. However, she found work only for short periods. Mother and daughter again took to keeping a boarding house, until in 1887/88 Harriet Jacobs became too sick to continue with the boarding house. Mother and daughter took on odd jobs and were supported by friends, among them Cornelia Willis. Harriet Jacobs died on March 7, 1897, in Washington, D.C., and was buried at Mount Auburn Cemetery in Cambridge next to her brother. Her tombstone reads, "Patient in tribulation, fervent in spirit serving the Lord". (Cf. Epistle to the Romans, 12:11–12).

=== Legacy ===
Prior to Jean Fagan Yellin's research in the 1980s, the accepted academic opinion, voiced by such historians as John Blassingame, was that Incidents in the Life of a Slave Girl was a fictional novel written by Lydia Maria Child. However, Yellin found and used a variety of historical documents, including from the Amy Post papers at the University of Rochester, state and local historical societies, and the Horniblow and Norcom papers at the North Carolina state archives, to establish both that Harriet Jacobs was the true author of Incidents, and that the narrative was her autobiography, not a work of fiction. Her edition of Incidents in the Life of a Slave Girl was published in 1987 with the endorsement of Professor John Blassingame.

In 2004, Yellin published an exhaustive biography (394 pages) entitled Harriet Jacobs: A Life. Yellin also conceived of the idea of the Harriet Jacobs Papers Project. In 2000, an advisory board for the project was established, and after funding was awarded, the project began on a full-time basis in September 2002. Of the approximately 900 documents by, to, and about Harriet Jacobs, her brother John S. Jacobs, and her daughter Louisa Matilda Jacobs amassed by the Project, over 300 were published in 2008 in a two volume edition entitled The Harriet Jacobs Family Papers.

Today, Jacobs is seen as an "icon of female resistance". David S. Reynolds' review of Yellin's 2004 biography in The New York Times, states that Incidents in the Life of a Slave Girl "and Narrative of the Life of Frederick Douglass, an American Slave are commonly viewed as the two most important slave narratives."

In an interview, Colson Whitehead, author of the best selling novel, The Underground Railroad, published in 2016, said: "Harriet Jacobs is a big referent for the character of Cora", the heroine of the novel. Cora has to hide in a place in the attic of a house in Jacobs's native North Carolina, where like Jacobs she is not able to stand, but like her can observe the outside life through a hole that "had been carved from the inside, the work of a previous occupant" (p. 185).

In 2017 Jacobs was the subject of an episode of the Futility Closet Podcast, where her experience living in a crawl space was compared with the wartime experience of Patrick Fowler.

According to a 2017 article in Forbes magazine, a 2013 translation of Incidents by Yuki Horikoshi became a bestseller in Japan.

In 2022, French artist Elizabeth Colomba painted a portrait of Jacobs. The title of the portrait, Tricked Out in a Gay and Fashionable Finery, was taken from the Norcom's notice advertising Jacobs as a runaway.

At the end of her preface to the 2000 edition of Incidents, Yellin writes,

She was, in Emerson's sense, 'representative'; expressing the idea of the struggle for freedom, her life empowers others. On my desk her portrait, smiling, urges me onward.

== Timeline: Harriet Jacobs, abolitionism and literature ==
Year	Jacobs and family	Politics and literature
1809		Birth of Edgar Allan Poe and Abraham Lincoln.
1811		Birth of Harriet Beecher Stowe.
1812		U.S. declares war on Britain (War of 1812).
1813	Harriet Jacobs is born.	
1815	Harriet's brother John S. Jacobs is born.	
1816		American Colonization Society is founded to resettle freed blacks in Africa.
1817		Birth of Henry David Thoreau.
1818		Birth of Frederick Douglass.
1819	Harriet Jacobs's mother dies.	Birth of Walt Whitman and Herman Melville.
1825	Harriet Jacobs's mistress dies, and Harriet becomes the property of Dr. Norcom's little daughter.	
1826	Harriet's father dies.	Death of Thomas Jefferson. His slaves are sold to cover his debt. James Fenimore Cooper writes The Last of the Mohicans.
1828	Jacobs's grandmother is bought by a friend and subsequently set free. Jacobs's uncle Joseph escapes, is returned in chains, and escapes again.	
1829	Birth of Jacobs's son Joseph.	Andrew Jackson is inaugurated as 7th President.
1831		Virginia slave revolt led by Nat Turner. William Lloyd Garrison begins publication of The Liberator.
1833	Birth of daughter Louisa Matilda Jacobs.	
1834		Slavery is abolished in the British Empire.
1835	Harriet Jacobs goes into hiding in the garret of her grandmother's house.	Mark Twain is born.
1836	Jacobs's 2nd year in the garret begins. Sawyer elected to Congress.	
1837	Jacobs's 3rd year in the garret begins.	The Gag Rule, aimed at suppressing debate on slavery, is accepted by U.S. Congress. E. P. Lovejoy, editor of an abolitionist paper, is murdered by mob in Alton, Illinois.
1838	Jacobs's 4th year in the garret begins. Sawyer goes to Chicago to marry. John S. Jacobs gains his freedom.	Frederick Douglass escapes to freedom, only weeks before John S. does.
1839	Jacobs's 5th year in the garret begins. John S. Jacobs goes on his whaling journey.	Slaves take control of the slave-ship, La Amistad. Theodore Dwight Weld's anti-slavery book, American Slavery As It Is, is published.
1840	Jacobs's 6th year in the garret begins. John S. still on the whaler.	First World Anti-Slavery Convention in London.
1841	Jacobs's 7th and final year in the garret begins. John S. still on the whaler.	Herman Melville goes on the whaling journey that would later inspire Moby-Dick.
1842	Harriet Jacobs escapes to the North. In New York she finds work as a nurse to the baby daughter of N.P.Willis. John S. still on the whaler.	
1843	John S. Jacobs returns and settles in Boston. Harriet Jacobs has to flee from New York and is reunited with her brother and both her children in Boston. (Note: According to Yellin's timeline in her 2000 edition of Incidents, this was in 1844. But in her biography of Jacobs (published 2004), Yellin gives an exhaustive account of the flight which took place a few days after "one Sunday morning in late October" 1843.)	
1845	Harriet Jacobs travels to England in her capacity as Imogen Willis's nanny.	Baptists split into the Northern and Southern conventions over the slavery issue. Edgar Allan Poe's The Raven is published.
1846		Congress declares war on Mexico.
1848		The Mexican–American War ends. Seneca Falls Convention on women's rights.
1849	Harriet Jacobs moves to Rochester, her friendship with Amy Post begins.	Thoreau writes Civil Disobedience.
1850	Harriet Jacobs re-hired by Willis's second wife Cornelia. Her brother John S. goes to California, then to Australia, and finally to England.	Fugitive Slave Law.
1851		Herman Melville writes Moby-Dick. Women's rights activist Amelia Bloomer starts to advocate for the "Bloomer dress".
1852	Cornelia Willis buys Harriet Jacobs's freedom.	Harriet Beecher Stowe writes Uncle Tom's Cabin.
1853	Jacobs's grandmother dies. Her first published writing is an anonymous letter to a New York newspaper. She begins writing Incidents.	
1854		Kansas-Nebraska Act.
1855	John S. Jacobs has his narrative, The United States Governed by Six Hundred Thousand Despots: A True Story of Slavery, published in Australia.	
1856		The slavery issue leads to open violence in Kansas ("Bleeding Kansas").
1857		Supreme Court ruling on Dred Scott: Blacks had "no rights which the white man was bound to respect". (Note: Referring to the law that made her the property of Norcom's daughter, Jacobs writes: "I regarded such laws as the regulations of robbers, who had no rights that I was bound to respect.")
1858	Harriet Jacobs completes the manuscript of Incidents, then travels to England, unsuccessfully trying to get it published.	
1859		John Brown's raid on Harper's Ferry. The Supreme Court declares the Fugitive Slave Law constitutional.
1860	Lydia Maria Child becomes the editor of Incidents.	Abraham Lincoln is elected the 16th President (November 7). South Carolina secedes (December 20).
1861	Publication of Incidents in the Life of a Slave Girl (January).	Davis inaugurated as president of the Confederacy (February 18). Abraham Lincoln inaugurated as 16th President (March 4). Confederate soldiers fire on Fort Sumter (April 12). The Civil War begins.
1862	Harriet Jacobs goes to Washington, D.C. and Alexandria, Virginia to help escaped slaves.	
1863		Lincoln's Emancipation Proclamation. Union victories at Gettysburg and Vicksburg.
1864	Jacobs School opens in Alexandria.	
1865	Harriet and Louisa Matilda Jacobs go to Savannah, Georgia to help freedmen.	Confederate surrender at Appomattox Court House. Assassination of Abraham Lincoln. 13th Amendment abolishes slavery.
1866	Harriet and Louisa Matilda Jacobs leave Savannah. Harriet helps Cornelia Willis nursing her dying husband.	
1867	Jacobs goes to England to collect money.	
1868	Jacobs returns from England and retires to private life.	
1873	John S. Jacobs returns to the U. S. and settles close to his sister's house. His death.	
1897	Death of Harriet Jacobs on March 7, 1897, in Washington, D.C.	

== See also ==
- African-American literature
- Olaudah Equiano
- William Jacob Knox Jr., American scientist, grandson of Jacobs's half brother Elijah
- Mary Prince
- Solomon Northup

== Notes and references ==
=== Bibliography ===
- Garfield, Deborah M.; Zafar, Rafia, eds. (1996), Harriet Jacobs and Incidents in the Life of a Slave Girl: New Critical Essays, Cambridge, New York: Cambridge University Press, ISBN 0-521-49779-5.
- Jacobs, Harriet (1861), Incidents in the Life of a Slave Girl. Written by Herself, Boston.
- Jacobs, Harriet A. (2000), Yellin, Jean Fagan (ed.), Incidents in the Life of a Slave Girl: Written by Herself. Enlarged Edition. Edited and with an Introduction by Jean Fagan Yellin. Now with "A True Tale of Slavery" by John S. Jacobs, Cambridge: Harvard University Press, ISBN 978-0-6740-0271-5.
- Jacobs, John Swanson (2024). Schroeder, Jonathan D. S. (ed.). The United States Governed by Six Hundred Thousand Despots: A True Story of Slavery. Chicago: University of Chicago Press. ISBN 978-0226-68430-7.
- Jacobs, John Swanson (1861), "A True Tale of Slavery", The Leisure Hour, London.
- Maillard, Mary (ed.), Whispers of Cruel Wrongs: The Correspondence of Louisa Jacobs and Her Circle, 1879–1911.
- Salenius, Sirpa (2017), "Transatlantic interracial sisterhoods: Sarah Remond, Ellen Craft, and Harriet Jacobs in England", Frontiers: A Journal of Women Studies, 38 (1), University of Nebraska Press: 166–196, doi:10.5250/fronjwomestud.38.1.0166, S2CID 164419591.
- Yellin, Jean Fagan (2004), Harriet Jacobs: A Life, New York: Basic Civitas Books, ISBN 0-465-09288-8.
- Yellin, Jean Fagan; Thomas, Joseph M.; et al., eds. (2008), The Harriet Jacobs Family Papers, The University of North Carolina Press, ISBN 978-0-8078-3131-1.
