= Amy Post =

American activist (1802–1889)

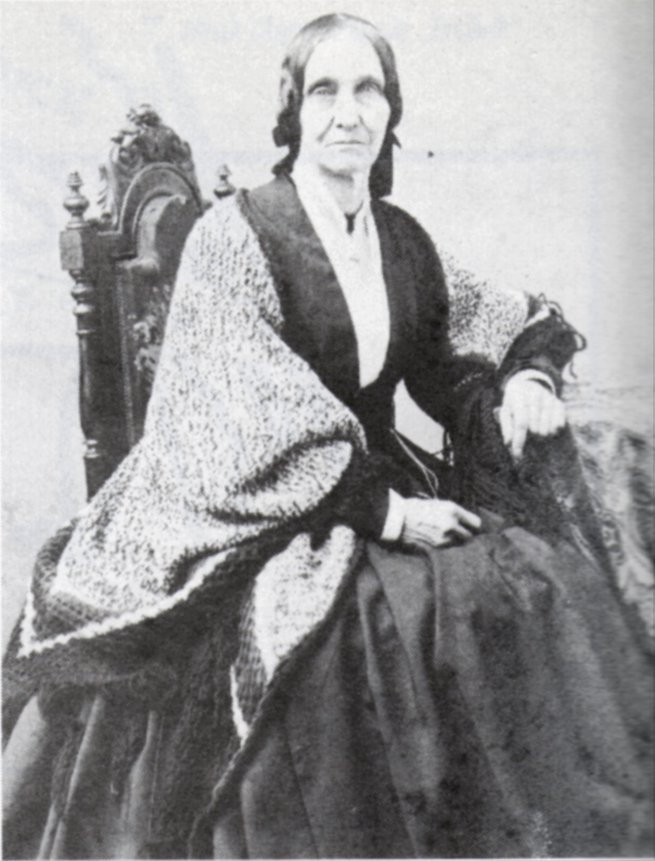
- Amy Kirby Post
- Born: Amy Kirby; December 20, 1802; Long Island, New York, U.S.
- Died: January 29, 1889 (aged 86); Rochester, New York, U.S.
- Occupation: Activist
- Known for: Abolitionism, women's rights movement
- Spouse: Isaac Post (m. 1828)
- Children: 5 (including stepchildren)
- Relatives: Hannah Post (sister)

Amy Kirby Post (December 20, 1802 – January 29, 1889) was an American activist who was central to several important social causes of the 19th century, including the abolition of slavery and women's rights. Post's upbringing in Quakerism shaped her beliefs in equality of all humans, although she ultimately left the Religious Society of Friends because of her desire to actively support social change efforts that called upon her to collaborate with non-Quakers. A friend of many prominent activists including Frederick Douglass and Susan B. Anthony, Post provided key support to the causes that she believed in both publicly and in less-public ways. She was a signer of the 1848 Declaration of Sentiments and a life-long activist who committed herself to work toward a range of intersecting social issues. This blended activism approach sets Post apart from many other activists of her time who advocated for a single issue in the hopes that doing so would lead to sufficient social change.

== Early life ==
Amy Kirby was born in 1802 to a Quaker family living in a farming community in Long Island, New York. Her parents were Jacob and Mary Kirby, who had five children. Amy Kirby grew up in the town of Jericho, where she attended the Quaker-run Jericho Friends School. The school taught both female and male students and also enrolled black students until 1817, at which point a segregated school was established by the Charity Society. As such, Kirby would have attended school with black children and would have also been in contact with various black people working on local farms and in homes in the area. She and her siblings were raised in the manner of Quakers, or Friends, meaning that they subscribed to a life of simplicity in, for instance, dress and speech. As Quakers, the Kirby family would have also believed in the equality of all people, no matter their sex or race.

== Activism ==
Amy Kirby Post's activism has been deemed as "radical" for the 19th century by historian Nancy A. Hewitt. Part of what makes her unique as an activist of this time period was her support of social movement work that not only included men and women but also resulted in black people and white people working together toward shared goals. Quaker values of equality of all persons contributed to Post's approach, as did the Religious Society of Friends' (or Quaker's) belief in principles of discussion and consensus. Hewitt labels Post's activism as a "commitment to universal or holistic reform," explaining that instead of focusing on one or two issues or constituencies, Post focused on concerns that sought equality across lines of race, class, and gender. Post's holistic reform also pursued democratic values, religious liberty, peace, and social justice. She did not look to one movement to usher in sufficient justice, but rather recognized interlocking sites of struggle and opportunity.

When Amy and Isaac Post moved to Rochester, New York in 1836, they were able to expand their activist reach. The couple made personal connections beyond the Quaker community and benefitted from living in a booming town. Thanks to the increasing infrastructure of the Erie Canal, railways, and telegraph lines, Rochester welcomed traveling lecturers and the city was the site of various conventions, protests, and movement presses.

=== Anti-slavery ===
Post was especially active in abolition activism, manifesting her values both in outward organizing and by cultivating friendships with other abolitionist leaders for whom she and her husband opened their home. Post and her husband also hosted abolition meetings in their home, taking up work that some Quakers considered to be inappropriate given that abolition brought together Quakers and those outside the religion who could join forces in calling for the end of slavery. In 1837, Post signed her first anti-slavery petition. Post was a founding member of the New York Western Anti-Slavery Society, which was established in 1842. The founding meeting of the society was chaired by Abby Kelley, a former Quaker, who was at the time an agent of the American Anti-Slavery Society. The meeting drew together a wide range of attendees from various religious denominations including Baptists, Presbyterians, and Hicksite Quakers. Post would subsequently work alongside Mary Ann M'Clintock and Elizabeth M'Clintock to organize the first fundraising fair to end slavery in western New York, raising $300 for the cause.

Frederick Douglass was one abolitionist who Post worked with directly, and she functioned as a close advisor and friend by the middle of the 19th century. Amy Post and her husband both supported Douglass's efforts to spread his message through print and speaking engagements as well as his efforts to encourage Rochester to allow black citizens to take part in public schooling and other civic activities. Post invited Douglass to speak at the Westbury Quaker Meeting despite some considering his message to be too radical, resulting in the abolitionist only meeting with activists sympathetic to his cause. Douglass stayed with the Posts during his first visit to Rochester, and William C. Nell, who worked in Rochester to create the abolitionist newspaper The North Star, lived with Amy and Isaac Post for more than a year.

Another friend of Amy Kirby Post was Sojourner Truth, who stayed at the Post home for several months in 1851 and then during various later visits to Rochester. This friendship is credited as deepening Amy and Isaac Post's commitments to abolition, women's rights, and spiritualism.

A notable friend of Post was Harriet Jacobs, who lived with the Posts in 1849 and 1850 after escaping enslavement in North Carolina. Jacobs disclosed to Post the horrors of her treatment while being enslaved, including having been sexually abused. Amy Kirby Post encouraged Jacobs to write about her experiences in order to expose the cruel reality of enslavement. Post also supported Jacobs's publication, Incidents in the Life of a Slave Girl, by attesting to the character of the writer, an expectation for certain authors at this time. Post also wrote the postscript to the autobiography, using an assumed name.

Amy Kirby Post published "The Underground Railroad in Rochester" in 1884. The piece, which both praised and described Underground Railroad efforts, was composed for the book Semi-centennial History of the City of Rochester edited by William F. Peck.

=== Women's rights ===
As part of the New York Western Anti-Slavery Society fundraising fair she helped to organize in 1846, Amy Kirby Post and other women abolitionists sold copies of Reverend Samuel J. May's "Sermon on the Rights of Women," marking an early public expression of her women's rights activism. In 1848, Amy Kirby Post began to be involved as an organizer in the women's movement. Acting upon her beliefs in equality for women, she attended the Seneca Falls Convention in 1848 in Seneca Falls, NY. She was among the one hundred women and men who signed the Declaration of Sentiments, which was first presented there.

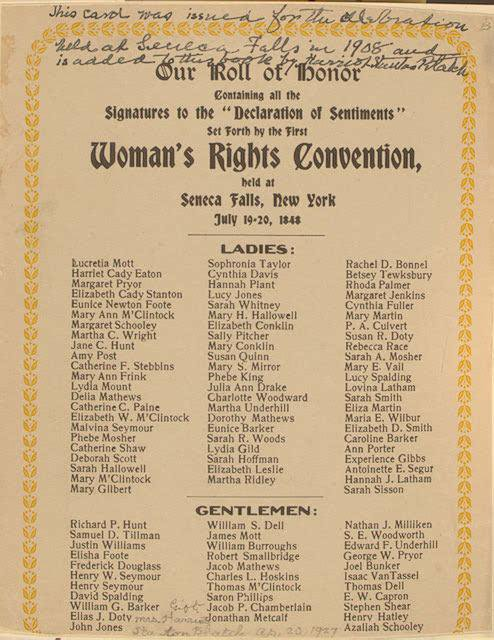
The Declaration of Sentiments, signed by Amy Post and other attendees of the first women's rights convention held in Seneca Falls, NY in 1848.

Two weeks later, she and several other women who had participated in the Seneca Falls Convention organized the Rochester Women's Rights Convention in the Post's hometown of Rochester, New York. A planning meeting chose Amy Kirby Post as temporary chair and designated a nominating committee to propose a slate of officers. The Seneca Falls Convention had followed tradition by electing a man as president of the convention. Defying tradition, the Rochester organizers proposed a woman, Abigail Bush, for that position. When the convention assembled in the Rochester Unitarian Church on August 2, Amy Kirby Post called it to order and read the suggested slate of officers. The proposal for a woman to be president of the convention was strongly opposed by some of the leaders of the women's movement who were present, fearing that women were not yet ready to take that step. Bush was elected despite the opposition, making this the first public meeting of both men and women in the United States whose presiding officer was a woman. Amy Kirby Post continued to attend women's rights conventions, and at a convention in Rochester in 1853, she signed "The Just and Equal Rights of Women" resolution.

Amy Kirby Post had an early influence on suffragist Susan B. Anthony through her encouragement and support of women's rights activities. Anthony relied on Post to support petition efforts, host traveling lecturers visiting Rochester, and organize conventions. Emboldened by information on women taxpayer's contributions to the city of Rochester, Amy Kirby Post attempted to register to vote in 1873. She and others who joined her was denied. Post's involvement in the National Woman Suffrage Association continued and at age 77 she was invited to speak at the thirtieth anniversary national convention held in Rochester.

=== Other activism ===
Post also co-founded a local arm of the Working Women's Protective Union and advocated for health reform as a key issue related to women's empowerment. Post served as treasurer for the union, whose work included advocating for higher wages for working women with the goal of pay parity between the sexes.

Post also variously provided aid, medical care, employment, and/or housing to women who suffered abuse or abandonment by men in a more informal expression of her work to support women in need.

During the United States Civil War, Amy Kirby Post supported National Loyal League efforts to petition for emancipation of enslaved people. She also collected materials for people who escaped enslavement and to send to "contraband" camps of formerly enslaved people who were freed by the Union Army. The bleak conditions of these camps, chronicled by Harriet Jacobs and Julia Wilbur, enabled Post to raise awareness about the encampments' inadequacies, which included insufficient food, shelter, and medical aid. Taking more direct action, the 60-year old Post visited camps in Washington, DC and in Alexandria, Virginia in 1863.

Calling for an end to capital punishment and to the exploitation of indigenous people were other activist causes that Amy Kirby Post directly supported during her lifetime.

== Resignation from Religious Society of Friends and later life ==
Elders in the Religious Society of Friends were critical of Amy Kirby Post, accusing her of being "too worldly" in her anti-slavery activism. Not willing to slow their abolition activism, Amy Kirby Post and Isaac Post stopped attending Quaker monthly meetings and officially withdrew from fellowship with Hicksite Quakers in 1845. This shift enabled them to more fully focus on abolition work.

In 1848, the Posts took into their home the Fox sisters, Kate and Margaret, who appeared to have acquired the ability to communicate with spirits through rapping noises. They introduced the girls to their circle of radical friends, and almost all became ardent believers in the emerging religion of Spiritualism. Writing to Amy Kirby Post about Spiritualism, acquaintance Sarah Thayer explained that the practice enabled women to direct their own and other women's spiritual life.

Amy Kirby Post survived her husband, Isaac Post, and continued to live in Rochester. By the last decade of her life, she was regarded as a notable local figure who was asked to contribute to celebrations of the city and of activist organizations to which she had contributed. She died in 1889, with friend and co-activist Lucy N. Colman providing the eulogy at her funeral service.

== Personal life ==
Amy's sister, Hannah Kirby, married another Quaker, Isaac Post, in 1822. After the birth of a daughter, Mary, Isaac Post moved Hannah Post and their baby to Scipio, a township in the southern part of Cayuga County, New York. Hannah Post suffered from isolation, given her husband's need to work on the family farm, his travels to the Quaker Yearly Meeting in New York City, and his trips to see his family on Long Island. Amy Kirby visited her sister in the spring of 1823. During this visit, Kirby took part in Quaker meetings and social events and drew the interest of Charles Willetts, who proposed marriage in 1824. Kirby went back home to Jericho but developed a relationship with Willetts. She and Willetts maintained their courtship through letter-writing until she returned to Hannah and Isaac Post's home after the birth of their son, Edmund, in 1825. In late May or early June of that same year, Willetts, by then her fiance, died. Hannah Post became critically ill and died in April 1827, with Amy providing care in the home at this time. By September 1828, Amy Kirby married Issac Post, the widow of her late sister, Hannah, thus becoming the stepmother to Mary and Edmund. Amy and Issac went on to have five children—Jacob Kirby Post, Joseph W. Post, Henry Post, Willett E. Post, and Matilda Post. Henry, Edmund, and Matilda all died in childhood.

== Legacy ==
Amy Kirby Post has been remembered for being an early model of "lifestyle politics" that blended activist efforts with daily living. These lifestyle politics included one's everyday practices of marital relations, language use, childbearing, methods of healing, choice of clothing, style of worship, and use of leisure time. Such choices could be a reflection of political commitments, and Post embraced this approach to expressing her activist commitments through her daily living and in addition to her organizing efforts. This type of activism enabled women to be as committed to political change as men even when they were denied the right to vote.

Post's activism also remains an example of an enmeshed social movement approach that advocated for multi-faceted forms of social justice rather than single-issue approaches such as abolition or women's rights that were thought to individually hold the potential to sufficiently change society.
