= Samuel Tredwell Sawyer =

American politician (1800–1865)

Member of the U.S. House of Representatives from North Carolina's 1st district
- In office March 4, 1837 – March 3, 1839
- Preceded by: William Biddle Shepard
- Succeeded by: Kenneth Rayner

Personal details
- Born: 1800
- Died: November 29, 1865 (aged 64–65)
- Party: Whig

Samuel Tredwell Sawyer (1800 – November 29, 1865) was an American attorney and politician. Although he served as Congressional Representative, today he is mostly remembered for fathering the two children of the young slave Harriet Jacobs, in whose autobiography, Incidents in the Life of a Slave Girl, he features prominently.

== Early life ==
Sawyer was born in Edenton, North Carolina, in 1800. He attended Edenton Academy and the University of North Carolina at Chapel Hill. Sawyer studied law, was admitted to the bar, and commenced practice in Edenton.

== Political career ==
Sawyer was elected to the North Carolina State house of representatives, serving from 1829 to 1832. Sawyer was elected to the North Carolina Senate in 1834.

He was elected in 1836 as a Whig to the Twenty-fifth Congress (March 4, 1837 - March 3, 1839), where he was chairman of the Committee on Expenditures on Public Buildings. Sawyer was an unsuccessful candidate for reelection to the Twenty-sixth Congress, moved to Norfolk, Virginia, and resumed the practice of law. He was editor of the Norfolk Argus for several years. He was appointed a collector of customs at Norfolk on May 16, 1853, serving until April 6, 1858. Sawyer moved to Washington, D.C.

During the Civil War, he was appointed on September 17, 1861, as commissary with the rank of major in the Confederate service. He served until August 2, 1862.

== Personal life ==
As a young man, before he married, Sawyer had a relationship with an enslaved Black woman, Harriet Jacobs, who was seeking protection from her master, Dr. James Norcom of Edenton. They had two children together, Joseph and Louisa, who were enslaved at birth, according to the legal principle of partus, which transferred the mother's status as free or enslaved to her children. After Jacobs went into hiding, she arranged with Sawyer to buy their children together with her brother John S. Jacobs in order to protect them from a sale to slave owners further away. In her autobiography, Jacobs relates that Sawyer promised to legally manumit their children, but failed to do so.

In August 1838, Sawyer married Lavinia Peyton, with whom he had three additional daughters, Fannie Lenox, Sarah Peyton, and Laura.

Later Harriet Jacobs escaped from North Carolina, making her way to Philadelphia and then New York. She wrote her autobiography, Incidents in the Life of a Slave Girl, and published it under a pseudonym in 1861. Sawyer features prominently in that book, pseudonymized as Mr. Sands.

== Later years ==
Moving to the North, Sawyer died in Bloomfield, New Jersey, in 1865.

U.S. House of Representatives
| Preceded by William B. Shepard | Member of the U.S. House of Representatives from North Carolina's 1st congressional district 1837–1839 | Succeeded by Kenneth Rayner |
