= Patrick Fowler =

British soldier

Trooper Patrick Fowler (died 1964, aged 90), from Dublin, was a member of a cavalry regiment of the British Army, the 11th Hussars (Prince Albert's Own) who served during World War I. During an advance, Fowler was cut off from his regiment, and after surviving alone in the woods for five months, was hidden by French civilians living in territory occupied by the German Army. He is therefore notable for spending most of The Great War hiding in a wardrobe. He managed to survive the war and moved to Scotland after leaving the army.

== World War I ==
On 26 August 1914, Fowler took part in the Battle of Le Cateau, but he was cut off from his regiment during a German advance. For five months, Fowler lived in the local woods, until he was discovered by a local man, Louis Basquin, on 15 January 1915. Instead of handing him over to the Germans, Basquin took him to the Bertry farmhouse of his mother-in-law, Madame Belmont-Gobert, and her daughter Angèle. It was decided to hide Fowler in a wardrobe that was 5 feet 6 inches (1.68 m) high, and 20 inches (510 mm) deep.

However, soon after Fowler moved in, sixteen German soldiers were billeted at the farm. As a result, the Germans spent much of their time in the same room as Fowler, unaware that he was hiding in the wardrobe. Fowler had to remain completely still and silent in order to avoid being spotted. He could only come out at night, and had to live on a small amount of food that was shared by those helping him. The German High Command then sent orders for the farmhouse to be requisitioned and the family to be moved to a small cottage. Madame Belmont-Gobert asked the billeting Germans to help her move, which included moving the wardrobe with Fowler inside it. Luckily for Fowler, none of the Germans looked inside.

The Germans only ever searched the wardrobe once, after a British nurse, Edith Cavell, was executed for helping Allied soldiers. However, the Germans failed to find Fowler as he had temporarily been hidden under a mattress, because, so Madame Belmont-Gobert later claimed, she had a premonition that the wardrobe would be searched.

Following the move to the new cottage, Fowler was allowed more freedom of movement, but he still had to hide whenever the Germans approached, and at night. Fowler was eventually reunited with the 11th Hussars who evacuated Bertry on 10 October 1918. Fowler was then able to explain to his regiment why he was absent for four years without being charged for desertion.

== Aftermath ==
After the war had finished, Fowler moved to the 8,400-acre (34 km^{2}) Glenernie Estate in the Scottish Highlands, where he lived with his wife and three daughters. The wardrobe was moved to the 11th Hussars regimental museum in Winchester and is currently on display.

Madame Belmont-Gobert was appointed Officer of the Order of the British Empire as a reward for her efforts in keeping Fowler hidden. By 1927, she was living in poverty, and so The Daily Telegraph launched a campaign to help her. As a result, the 11th Hussars gave Madame Belmant-Gobert £100, and then gave her full billeting pay for caring for Fowler, dating back to 1914. In response, the French War Minister Paul Painlevé demanded that the British government would not have to pay Madame Belmant-Gobert any more money, because they would give her a pension.

== Popular culture ==
There was a plan in 2000 to make a film based on Fowler's life during the war, with Robert Carlyle tipped to play Fowler and backing from Bill Shepherd. It was planned to be made by Shepperton Studios and shot on in location in France, but nothing came of the project.

A sketch inspired by Fowler's time in the wardrobe was included in a Horrible Histories special about World War I in 2014 (series 5, episode 15, 'Frightful First World War Special', first shown 4 August 2014).

In 2017 Fowler was the subject of an episode of the Futility Closet Podcast, where his experience living in a wardrobe was compared with the experience of Harriet Jacobs, a North Carolina slave and future author.
