= Louisa Matilda Jacobs =

African-American abolitionist (1833–1917)

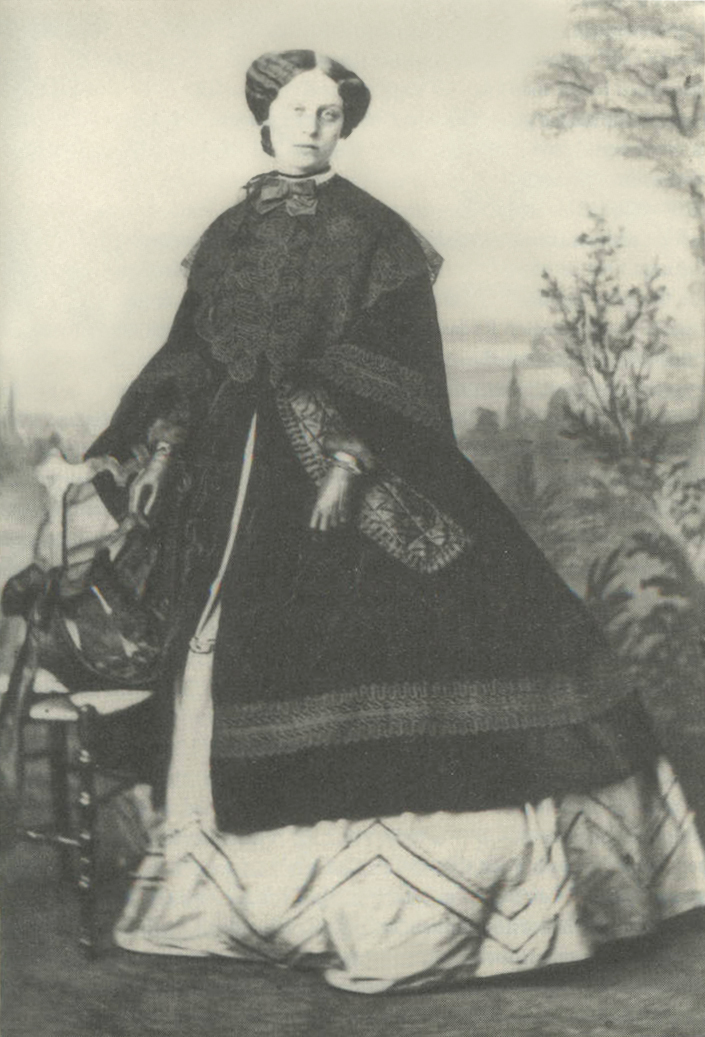
- Born: October 19, 1833; Edenton, North Carolina
- Died: April 5, 1917 (aged 83); Cambridge, Massachusetts
- Occupations: Abolitionist, civil rights activist, educator, author
- Parents: Samuel Tredwell Sawyer (father); Harriet Jacobs (mother)
- Relatives: John S. Jacobs (uncle)

Louisa Matilda Jacobs (October 19, 1833 – April 5, 1917) was an African-American abolitionist and civil rights activist and the daughter of famed escaped slave and author, Harriet Jacobs. Along with her activism, she also worked as a teacher in Freedmen's Schools in the South, and as a matron at Howard University.

== Early life ==
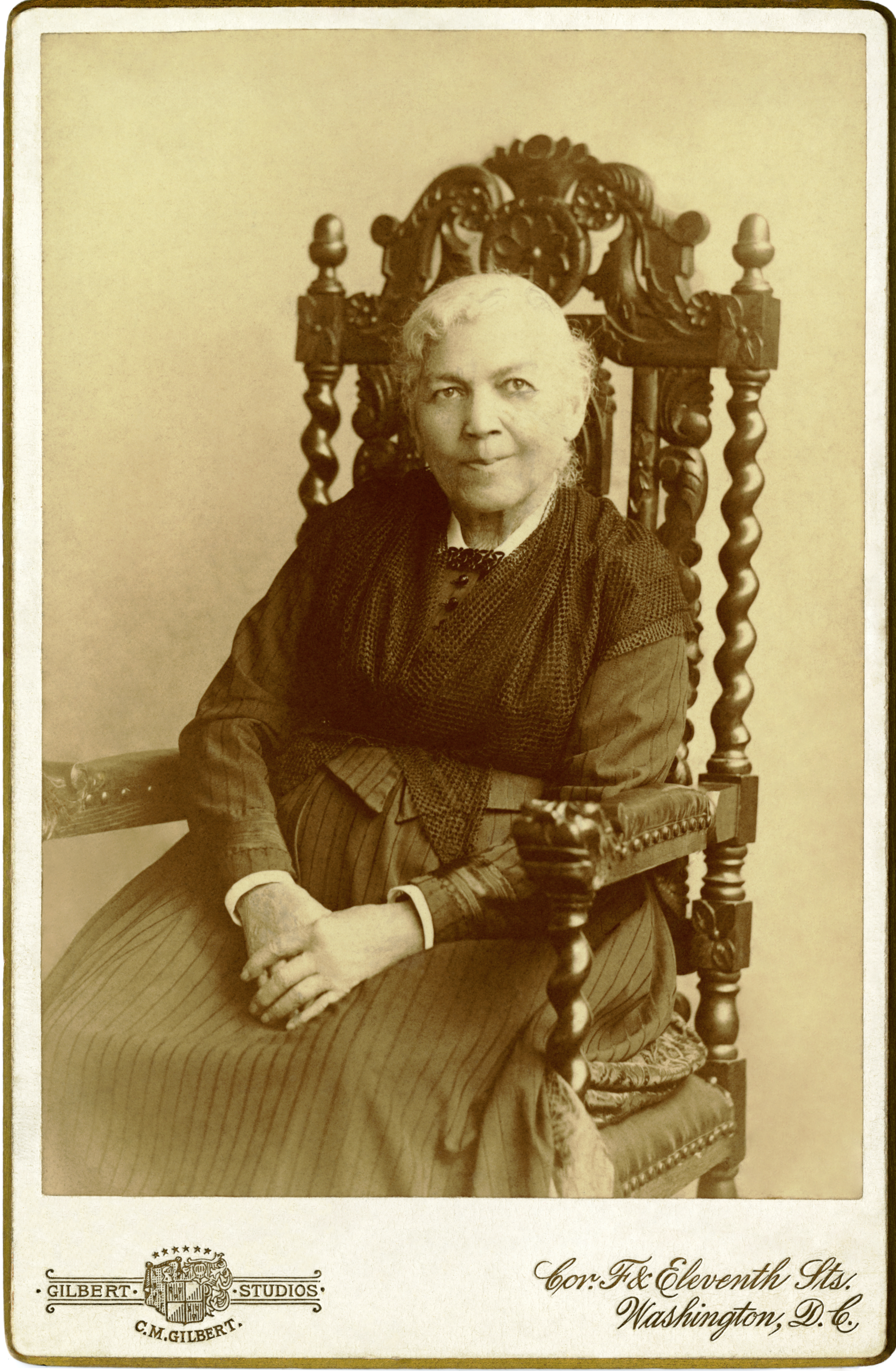
Louisa's mother, Harriet Jacobs

Jacobs was born in Edenton, North Carolina on October 19, 1833, to Samuel Tredwell Sawyer (a congressman and newspaper editor) and his mistress Harriet Jacobs, at a time when Harriet was enslaved by Dr. James Norcom. Louisa also had an older brother, Joseph Jacobs, born in 1829. Harriet Jacobs had been sexually harassed by Norcom for many years, but she continually refused his advances and mistakenly hoped that her relationship with Sawyer would be a deterrent to Norcom. As Harriet continued to refuse Norcom's advances, Norcom began to threaten her children in anticipation of coercing Harriet into a sexual relationship, and she became increasingly fearful for them.

When Louisa was two years old, Harriet decided to escape, in hopes that Norcom would sell Louisa and Joseph into a safer situation. Harriet's hopes proved correct when their father, Sawyer, purchased the children from Norcom and sent Louisa to live with her great-grandmother, Molly, then taking her to Washington, D.C., before sending her to live with a cousin in Brooklyn, New York. Harriet located Louisa in Brooklyn and fled to Boston with her. Harriet would write of her experience in Incidents in the Life of a Slave Girl, and the early years of Louisa's life are included under the pseudonym 'Ellen.'

== Career and activism ==
=== Education ===
While in Boston, Jacobs was educated at home; she afterwards attended the Young Ladies' Domestic Seminary in Clinton, New York. She later obtained training to become a teacher in Boston.

=== Activism ===
Jacobs's mother Harriet became acquainted with Amy Post and her feminist abolitionist circle while Louisa was studying in Clinton, leading to both Harriet and Louisa becoming involved in the movement. Louisa divided her time between living with the family of Zenas Brockett, a white abolitionist, and helping her mother in the Willis family home. She also spoke about women's suffrage on an American Equal Rights Association lecture tour through New York state in 1867 which included other activists such as Susan B. Anthony and Charles Lenox Remond.

=== Career ===
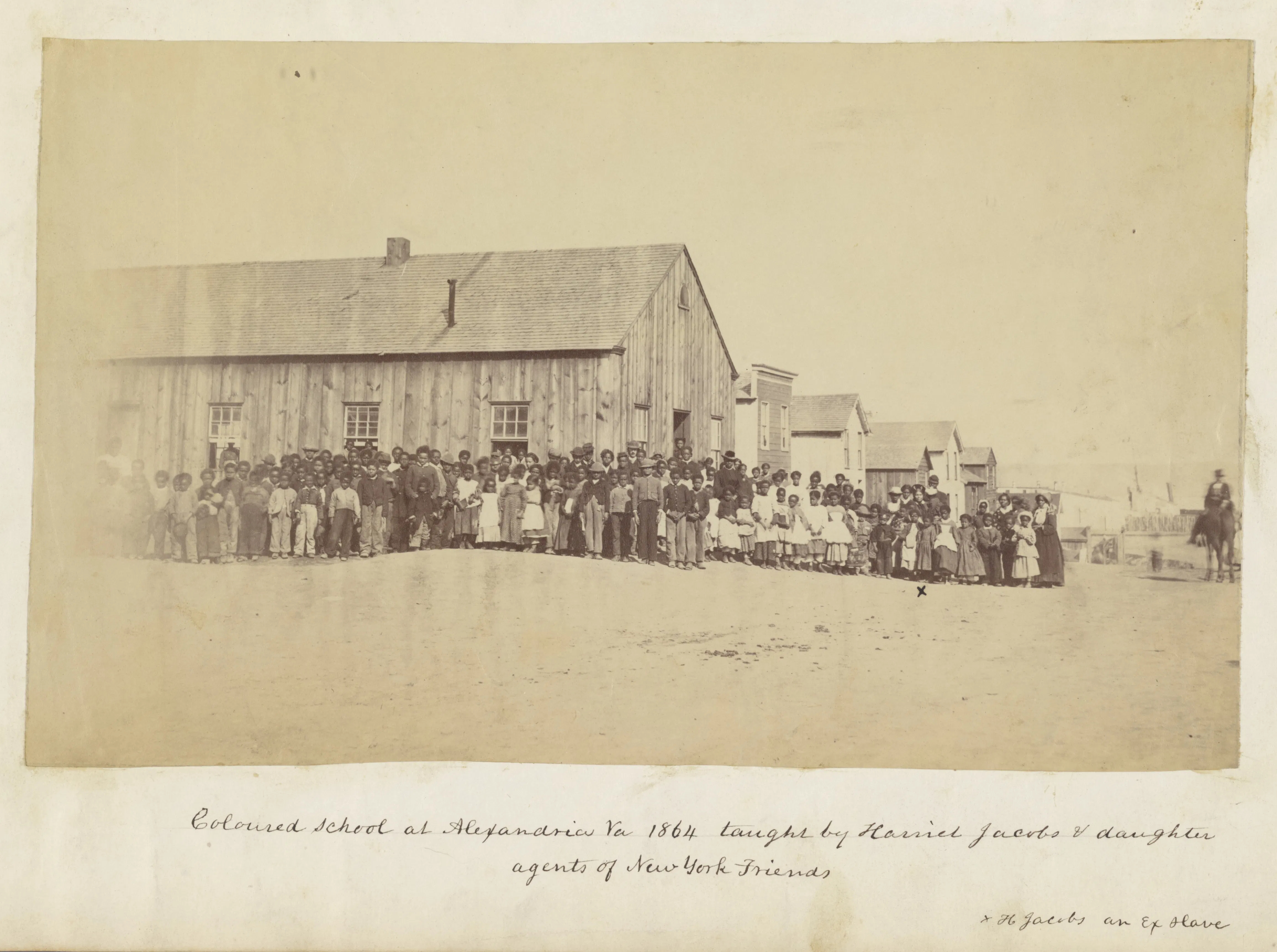
The Jacobs Free School

In 1863, Jacobs and her mother founded Jacobs Free School, a freedmen's school in Alexandria, Virginia, putting her teaching education to use by educating Black children who had been freed from slavery. The school grew quickly, requiring a second teacher to be hired within just a few months of opening. Three years later, she moved to Savannah, Georgia with her mother and founded a new freedmen's school, which Louisa chose to name Lincoln School.

Following her teaching career Jacobs established a boarding house in Cambridge, Massachusetts with her mother, where they worked and lived side by side, with Jacobs taking on most of the responsibility in later years as she also cared for her ailing mother. Following her mother's death, Jacobs worked as matron of the National Home for the Relief of Destitute Colored Women and Children, then accepted a matron position at Howard University before retiring at 75 years of age due to a heart condition. She spent most of her remaining years with the Willis family, who had become like family during her mother's tenure with them.

== Later life and death ==
Jacobs suffered from a heart condition and her health deteriorated following several years of being a full time nurse to her ailing mother. She died on April 5, 1917, in Cambridge, Massachusetts, where she was buried alongside her mother in the family plot of the Mount Auburn Cemetery.
