= Lucy N. Colman =

American novelist

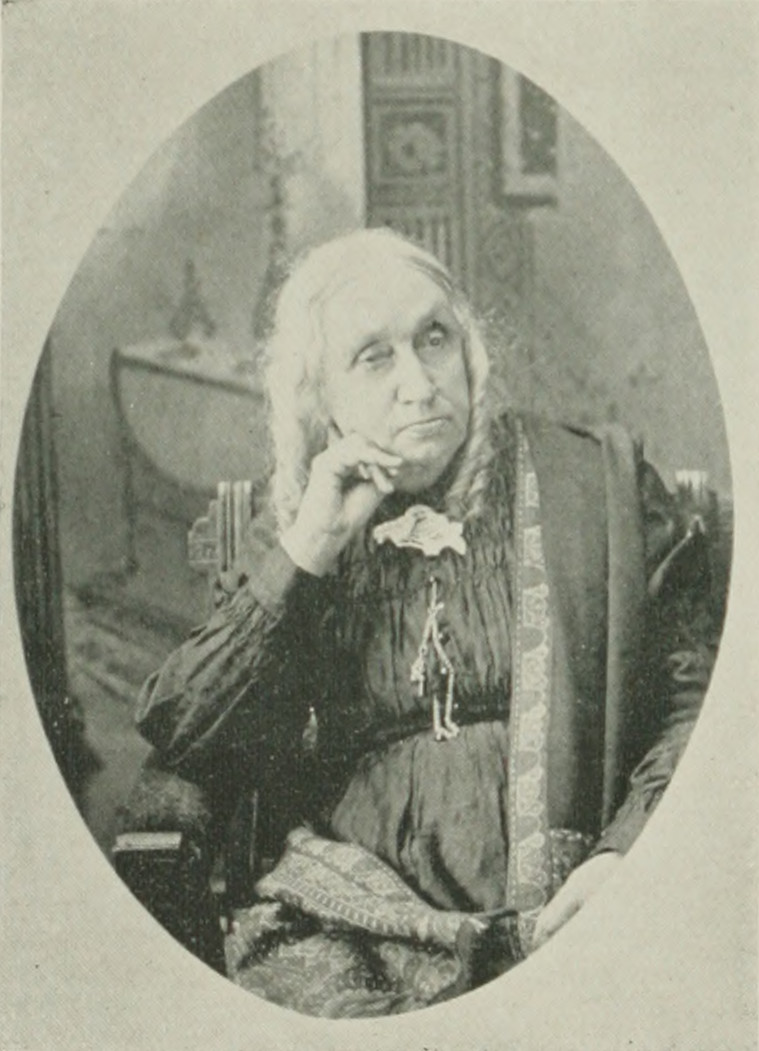
- Born: Lucy Newhall Colman; July 26, 1817; Sturbridge, Massachusetts, US
- Died: January 18, 1906 (aged 88); Syracuse, New York, US
- Burial place: Mount Hope Cemetery
- Occupations: Freethinker, Abolitionist & Feminist Campaigner

Lucy Newhall Colman (July 26, 1817 – January 18, 1906) was an American freethinker, abolitionist and feminist campaigner. She campaigned for racial justice and for the education of African Americans.

Colman wrote an autobiography, called Reminiscences in 1891, covering her memories of the abolitionist movement.

== Personal life ==
Colman – also referred to as Lucy Davis and Lucy Newhall Danforth Colman during different times of her life – was born in Sturbridge, Massachusetts, to parents Hannah Newhall (who died in 1824) and Erastus Danforth (a blacksmith). She first married John Maubry Davis (also a universalist) in 1835 but he died six years later from tuberculosis. Eight years later she married Luther Coleman, who was killed 11 years later in a work accident at the New York Central railroad. She argued that it was negligence, due to the fact that the company did not spend the money that was needed for repairs. The company paid for the funeral, but when prompted by Colman to financially support her thereafter, refused.

Colman had one child, a daughter, named Gertrude. Having her made her think about why married women and mothers had such few rights and seemed to utterly depend on the "goodwill of their husbands" for any kind of freedoms. When Gertrude died in 1862, she opted for a secular memorial conducted by Frederick Douglass as opposed to holding a traditional funeral.

== First yearnings for justice ==
Very early in her life, Colman felt disturbed by injustices in the world. At age six, she was "horrified" to discover that slavery existed and often asked her mom about it. By the time she was 35 years old, she had renounced the Christian church, "more because of its complicity with slavery than from a full understanding of the foolishness of its creeds." She later embraced spiritualism along with some of the more radical abolitionist and women's rights activists at the time.

== Teacher ==
Following the death of her second husband, in 1854 Colman became a teacher in a segregated colored school in Rochester. However, she was so horrified by this that she lobbied for the parents to withdraw their children, causing the closure of the school. Together with Susan B. Anthony, she spoke at the State Teachers' Convention against corporal punishment in schools and unfairness of different salary for male and female teachers. It was during this time Colman developed a reputation for being a liberal cause campaigner by "silencing Christian hecklers," as she threw their principles back at them. But within two years, Rochester started offering education to both white and black children.

== Accomplishments ==
Colman visited President Abraham Lincoln (together with Sojourner Truth). In 1878, at the New York State Freethinkers' Association Convention in Watkins Glen, she arranged bail for one of the associates of D. M. Bennett who were selling a marriage reform and birth control tract and were arrested. She then got the charges dropped against them all. In 1880 she spoke at that very same convention, together with Robert Green Ingersoll.

== Career ==
Between 1856 and 1860, Colman worked with the Western Anti-Slavery Society and the American Anti-Slavery Society. In 1859 she assisted in the petition drive for women's right to vote in New York. In 1863, she was appointed secretary at the Women's National Loyal League. In America's largest petition drive to date, the League presented almost 400,000 signatures to Congress. This substantially facilitated the passage of the Thirteenth Amendment, eliminating slavery in America.

In 1864, Colman became matron at the National Orphan Asylum in Washington, DC. This organization was run by the National Association for the Relief of Destitute Colored Women and Children. At the same time, she taught and served as a superintendent in schools in Washington and Arlington, Virginia, for the National Freedman's Relief Association, an institution founded to help former slaves.

== National Women's Rights Convention ==
This annual series of meetings was established in order to "increase the visibility of the early women's rights movement" in America. Lucy Colman attended the first meeting in Worcester in 1850. The array of topics discussed included: women's property rights, marriage reform, career opportunities and greater educational access. Encouraged by her friend Amy Kirby Post, who would later write a foreword to her autobiography, Colman also spoke at this convention on the topic of the anti-slavery movement.

== Publications ==
Colman's writings occasionally appeared in the anti-slavery newspaper, The Liberator, as well as The Truthseeker, for example in 1858 covering a conference speech by Douglass.

== Recognition ==
In 1898, Samuel Porter Putnam, in 400 Years of Freethought, described Colman as follows: "Lucy N. Colman, in whom the ardor of youth finds no ashes in snowy age, and the silver morn is radiant ever ... Mrs. Colman is radical in every direction. She is opposed to white slavery as well as black slavery, and has devoted herself to woman's rights as well as to the rights of man. She is a radical Freethinker, having outgrown superstitions of every kind. She has not lost her interest in any living question. She has had a busy and eventful career; has mingled with the world, among its characters and great movements, and has done her share to bring about the great gains of the present time. She has shown what a woman can do who has self-reliance, energy, and devotion to truth and right. Her name shines in the annals of progress."

Colman is remembered on International Women's Day and Women's History Month as "one of nineteenth-century America's most active – and best-connected – freethinkers." She was referred to as "the Zelig of the Golden Age of Freethought."
