= William Biddle Shepard =

American politician (1799–1852)

William Biddle Shepard (May 14, 1799 – June 20, 1852) was a congressional representative from North Carolina; born in New Bern, North Carolina, May 14, 1799; completed preparatory studies; attended the University of North Carolina at Chapel Hill in 1813; was graduated from the University of Pennsylvania at Philadelphia; studied law; was admitted to the bar and commenced practice in Camden County, North Carolina, later removing to Elizabeth City, North Carolina; also engaged in banking; elected to the Twenty-first through Twenty-third Congresses and elected as a Whig to the Twenty-fourth Congress (March 4, 1829 – March 3, 1837); chairman, Committee on District of Columbia (Twenty-fourth Congress); was not a candidate for renomination in 1836; member of the state senate 1838–1840 and 1848–1850; member of the board of trustees of the University of North Carolina 1838–1852; died in Elizabeth City, N.C., June 20, 1852; interment in St. Paul's Churchyard, Edenton, North Carolina.

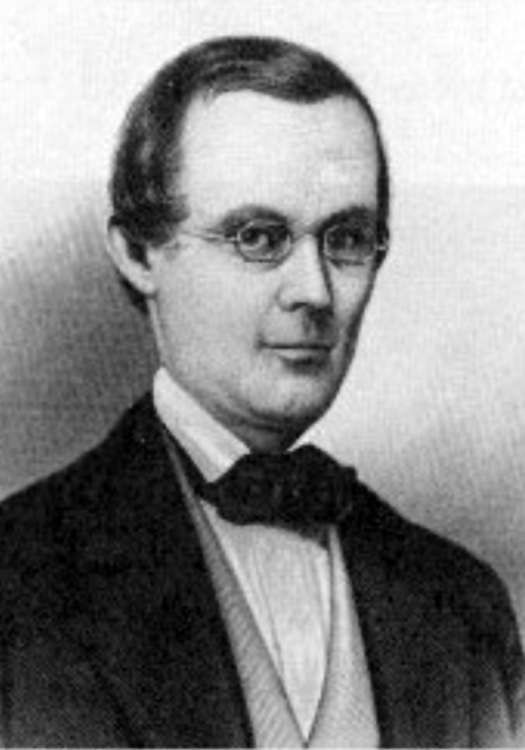
William Biddle Shepard, US Representative from North Carolina

== See also ==
- Twenty-first United States Congress
- Twenty-second United States Congress
- Twenty-third United States Congress
- Twenty-fourth United States Congress

U.S. House of Representatives
Preceded by Lemuel Sawyer	Member of the U.S. House of Representatives from North Carolina's 1st congressional district 1829–1837	Succeeded by Samuel T. Sawyer
