= Julia Wilbur =

Quaker abolitionist, suffragist and nurse (1815–1895)

Julia Ann Wilbur
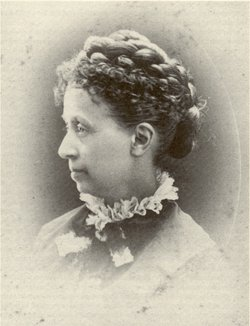
- Born: August 8, 1815; Milan, New York, US
- Died: June 6, 1895 (aged 79); Washington, D.C., US
- Occupations: Teacher; abolitionist; patent office clerk
- Parents: Stephen Wilbur; Mary Lapham
- Relatives: Sarah (sister); Freda (niece)

Julia Wilbur (August 8, 1815 – June 6, 1895) was an American abolitionist and suffragist. She kept a diary during the Civil War and in it she records events of historical significance as well as everyday happenings that provide a picture into life during that time. She is noted to have worked alongside Susan B. Anthony to establish voting rights for women. She was an early member and later secretary of the Rochester Ladies' Anti-Slavery Society (RLASS), which helped fund Frederick Douglass' newspaper.

== Early life and education ==
Julia Ann Wilbur was born on August 8, 1815, in Milan, New York, the third child of Stephen Wilbur and Mary Lapham. She attended Nine Partners Boarding School in Dutchess County, New York, from 1829 to 1831. Her mother died in 1835 and her father soon after remarried. She remained at home helping to raise her siblings before she moved to Rochester, New York, in 1844 to become a teacher.

Working within the Rochester public school system she became frustrated by the wage gap between male and female teachers, an injustice that may have sparked her interest and later engagement in the women's rights effort.

In April 1849, Wilbur had a notable first interaction with Harriet Jacobs, who had been formerly enslaved and then freed. The two women became friends while working in Alexandria, Virginia with formerly enslaved people, both those freed and escaped. Wilbur also became involved with the Rochester Ladies' Anti-Slavery Society (RLASS) early on, in which capacity she acted as a correspondence secretary.

Unfortunately, Wilbur's life changed dramatically in April 1858, after her sister, Sarah, died, leaving Wilbur to become the guardian of Sarah's daughter Freda. While Wilbur took well to her new motherly role, the situation further deteriorated in January 1860 when Freda's father, having recently remarried, decided to claim custody of his daughter. As a result of having her niece so abruptly ripped from her life, Wilbur entered a severe depression that lasted for the following two years. Luckily, Wilbur's devastation did finally lift - this emotional shift being caused in large part by her move to Alexandria, Virginia in October 1862.

== Civil War ==
In 1862, the RLASS asked Wilbur if she were interested in working to help "contrabands": that is, the men, women, and children who escaped slavery by crossing into Union-occupied territory. She recorded in her diary the original request: "a teacher to go South & are inquiring for me." She agreed and traveled to Washington in October of that year, originally planning to stay in the nation's capital. However, officers of a group called the National Freedmen's Relief Association urged her to move across the river to Alexandria, Virginia, which the Union Army had entered at the start of the war, and to work as a relief agent, rather than a teacher.

Wilbur agreed, and worked in Alexandria from November 1862 to February 1865. Wilbur worked there alongside Harriet Jacobs, who moved to Alexandria in January 1863. The women provided supplies and education to freed formerly enslaved people. This work was emotionally and physically taxing for Julia and exposed her to the sufferings of others in a very personal way. Among other efforts, she advocated for better housing and health care for freed people. She solicited clothing and other supplies from groups up north, which she distributed from a makeshift "clothing room" in an occupied house on Washington Street.

== Reconstruction ==
After the war ended, Wilbur worked for the Freedmen's Bureau, still mostly funded by the RLASS. In this capacity, she served as what was called a visiting agent, distributing tickets to exchange for fuel, food, and other necessities. She not only lamented that the needs far outstripped the available aid, but also recognized that public opinion was turning against Reconstruction efforts. She also made several trips to Richmond and Fredericksburg to provide supplies and to witness and report on conditions for formerly enslaved populations.

== Suffrage efforts ==
Before the war, Wilbur spent more time in abolition than woman's rights activities, although always strongly supported economic, social, and political rights for women. In 1869, she planned with five other women to register to vote in local elections in Washington. They presented a letter to election judges that read, in part, "We know that it is unusual for those of our sex to make such a request. We do so because we believe ourselves entitled to the franchise." Although the judges refused the request, their effort was covered in the press.

== Later years ==
Realizing that work with the Freedmen's Bureau was winding down, Wilbur sought a job with the federal government, a member of the first generation of female government workers. In 1865, she moved to Washington, DC and took a job working in the U.S. Patent Office. According to a letter written by Wilbur's great-niece, Wilbur was the first woman admitted to work in this office. She served as a clerk and worked with the Patent Office until she was almost 80 years old. Julia spent her last years living in Washington D.C. with her sister, Frances, until her death in 1895. Her obituary reported that she died of "influenza and results" and noted "for many years she engaged in active partisan labor for the cause of freedom."
