= Isaac Post =

American abolitionist

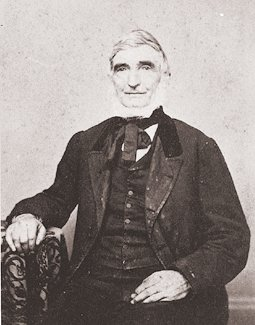
Isaac Post

Isaac Post was a radical Hicksite Quaker from Rochester, New York, and leader in the nineteenth-century anti-slavery and women's rights movements. Among the first believers in Spiritualism, he helped to associate the young religious movement with the political ideas of the reform movement along with his wife Amy Post.

== Early life ==
Isaac Post was born February 26, 1798, in Westbury, New York, to Edmund and Catherine (Willetts) Post, members of the Religious Society of Friends, also known as Quakers. Amy Kirby Post was born December 20, 1802, in Jericho, New York, among the eight children of Joseph and Mary (Seaman) Kirby, who were also Quakers. Commitment to humanitarian reform was characteristic of Quakers and foundational to the Posts' later work as abolitionists and women's-rights activists.

Around 1821, Isaac married Amy's elder sister Hannah. In 1823 they moved to the village of Scipio in Cayuga County, New York, and established a farm where Amy soon came to live with them. In 1827 Hannah fell ill and died, and Amy became nursemaid to her sister's two children.

Also in 1827, Elias Hicks, a relative of the Kirbys, charged that the Religious Society of Friends had lost its way, initiating a split of the "Hicksites", including Isaac Post, from their more orthodox brethren. When in 1829 Amy Kirby married Isaac Post, criticism for having taken a "Hicksite husband" led to her withdrawal from the Jericho Meeting to which she had belonged since birth. In addition to her niece and nephew, Amy's maternal responsibilities came to include four more children she had with Isaac: Jacob (1830), Joseph (1834), Matilda (1840), and Willet (1847). The couple moved to Rochester in 1836.

== Abolitionists ==
The couple quickly became involved in radical causes. Isaac dedicated much of his time to a very progressive group of Quakers who sought to give both men and women the same rights during the meetings of the Religious Society of Friends. In 1842, Amy and Isaac Post became two of the founders of the Western New York Anti-Slavery Society (WNYASS). WNYASS was not an abolitionist group only for Quakers. Among its members were evangelical Protestants and deists. By the early 1840s, radical Quakers began to hold abolitionist meetings in the Post home, where prominent reform lecturers such as William Lloyd Garrison, Frederick Douglass, Susan B. Anthony, and Sojourner Truth visited and spoke. Douglass became a close personal friend of the Posts who helped establish him in Rochester where he published his newspaper the "North Star". Douglass and the Posts also collaborated in ferrying fugitive slaves and their home served as a station on the Underground Railroad, holding as many as 20 escaped slaves at a time. In 1848, the Posts also left the GYM due to pressure from elders to end their abolitionist activities as well as to help form the Yearly Meeting of Congregational Friends (YMCF), which differed greatly from the GYM in several ways. They had no ministers or elders as all people were considered equal within the YMCF. The members of YMCF would do whatever they considered necessary to end slavery, and therefore put no limit on "worldly" efforts to abolish slavery. Finally, the YMCF had no tolerance for racial or sexual discrimination. They believed that all people should be considered equal morally, religiously, and politically. The motto of the Congregational Friends was "common natures, common rights, and a common destiny."

== Spiritualism ==
In 1848, the Posts took into their home the Fox sisters, Kate and Margaret, who appeared to have acquired the ability to communicate with spirits through rapping noises. They introduced the girls to their circle of radical friends, and almost all became ardent believers in the emerging religion of Spiritualism. Isaac Post himself became an acknowledged medium. His 1852 book, Voices From the Spirit World, Being Communications From Many Spirits, was presented as the spirit writings of eminent persons such as Benjamin Franklin and George Fox.

== Personal life ==
Historic Marker at the former site of the Post House in Rochester, NY

Isaac's brother, Joseph (1803–1888), was also an abolitionist and had early differences with the Quakers, although they finally came around to his point of view. He encouraged Isaac T. Hopper, Charles Marriot, and James S. Gibbons when they were disowned by the Religious Society of Friends on account of their outspoken opposition to slavery. Joseph spent his whole life in the house where he was born. Isaac Post died in April 1872. Amy Post died January 29, 1889. They are buried together in Mount Hope Cemetery in Rochester, New York.

== Sources ==
- Braude, Ann (2001). Radical Spirits: Spiritualism and Women's Rights in Nineteenth-Century America. Bloomington: Indiana University Press. ISBN 0253215021.
- Britten, Emma Hardinge (1884). Nineteenth Century Miracles: Spirits and their Work in Every Country of the Earth. New York: William Britten. ISBN 0766162907.
- Buescher, John B. (2003). The Other Side of Salvation: Spiritualism and the Nineteenth-Century Religious Experience. Boston: Skinner House Books. ISBN 1558964487.
- Carroll, Bret E. (1997). Spiritualism in Antebellum America. Bloomington: Indiana University Press. ISBN 0253333156.
- Doyle, Arthur Conan (1926). The History of Spiritualism, volume 1. New York: G.H. Doran. ISBN 1410102432.
- Hewitt, Nancy A. "Post, Amy Kirby." American National Biography Online. Oxford: Oxford University Press, 2000. | url= http://www.anb.org/articles/15/15-00553.html |
- Ripley, C. Peter. The Black Abolitionist Papers: Vol. 3, United States, 1830–1846. North Carolina: Chapel Hill University Press, 1991. Also available online at | url= https://web.archive.org/web/20080226213028/http://www.netlibrary.com/ |
- Western New York Suffragists: Amy Kirby Post. Rochester Regional Library Council: 2000. | url= |
