= Seduction novel =

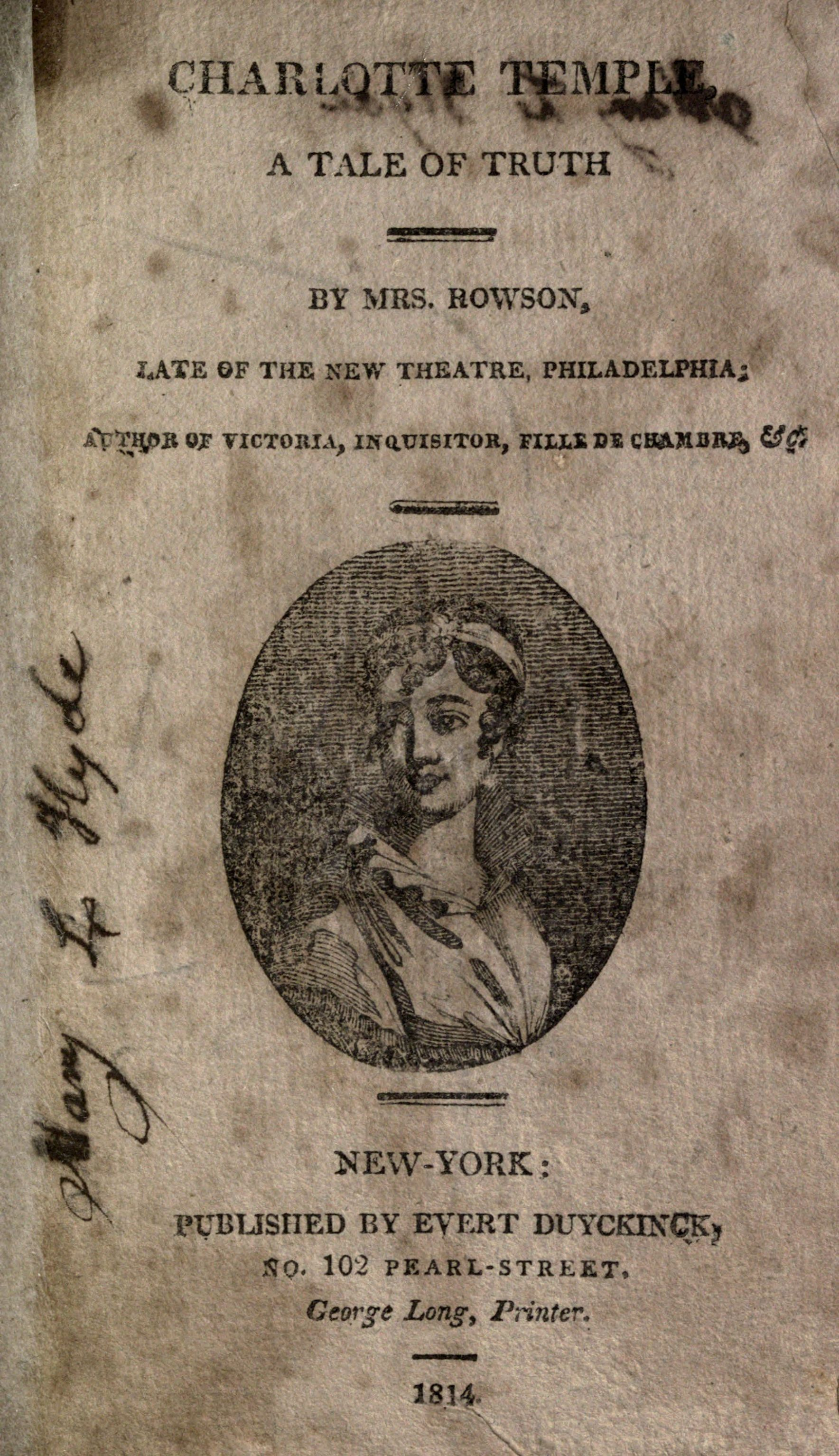
Title page of 1814 edition of Charlotte Temple

The seduction novel is a literary genre which was popular in the late 18th and early 19th centuries. A seduction novel presents the story of a virtuous, but helpless woman who is seduced by a man that will eventually betray her. "Inevitably, she yields herself to him; inevitably, she dies." Her failure to adhere to the commonly accepted standard of sexual behavior leads to her "self-destruction and death".

== Significance ==
These novels brought about the discussions of women's education and their roles in society, and marked a shift in social standards for how women were viewed by others and how they acted in society. In the 1790s, after the publishing of la Nouvelle Heloise, many people began to discuss how to protect women from being taken advantage of as portrayed in these novels. In France at this time, there were people who believed that women should be given better education, some thought that women should be given guidance, and others believed that writing should be more closely censored in order to protect women. In the United States during the 18th and 19th century, when these novels were especially popular, the novels were a representation of the social and political shifts occurring at the time. The novels served as an example to families as to why both sons and daughters needed to be educated in order to protect them from the system that was harming them, and as to why the social and political systems needed to be changed.

== Notable works ==
During the 18th century, popular seduction novels at the time were Clarissa by Samuel Richardson (1747), The French novel La Nouvelle Heloise written by author Jean-Jacques Rousseau (1761), Charlotte Temple by Susanna Rowson (1791), The Power of Sympathy by William Hill Brown (1789), and The Coquette by Hannah Webster Foster (1797). During the beginning and mid 19th century, popular seduction stories around that time was the short story "The Quadroons" by Lydia Maria Child (1842), and Harriet Jacobs's autobiography Incidents in the Life of a Slave Girl (1861), which in some way is linked to this genre, but here the sexual transgression of the narrator does not lead to self-destruction, rather the book ends with the narrator gaining freedom for herself and her children.
