= Slaves in Algiers =

1794 American comedic play

Slaves in Algiers, or A Struggle for Freedom
- Written by: Susanna Rowson
- Subject: Barbary piracy, American Christian values
- Genre: Captivity narrative
- Setting: Late 18th century Algiers

Premiere
- Date premiered: June 30, 1794
- Place premiered: Philadelphia New Theatre

Slaves in Algiers, or A Struggle for Freedom is a play written by Susanna Haswell Rowson in 1794. It is her first and only surviving play, first staged at the New Theatre (later renamed the Chestnut Street Theatre) in Philadelphia, Pennsylvania, on June 30, 1794. A three-act play interspersed with songs, it is a response to the Barbary captivity crisis.

While the play is not considered to have great literary merit, it is discussed for its complex mix of political agendas, which offer insight into its period of early US history. It expresses an early feminism, desires for American imperialism in the Islamic world, and uses antisemitism to excuse the failings of capitalism.

== Characters ==
- Augustus: Son of Rebecca and Constant
- Ben Hassan: British-born Jew who converts to Islam
- Constant: Rebecca's British husband
- Fetnah: The daughter of Ben Hassan
- Frederic: American slave
- Henry: American slave, Olivia's fiancé
- Muley Moloc: Dey (ruler) of Algiers
- Mustapha: Servant in the harem
- Olivia: The daughter of Rebecca and Constant
- Rebecca: Zealous American slave
- Sadi: Servant in the harem
- Sebastian: Spaniard sailor
- Selima: Servant in the harem
- Zoriana: The daughter of Dey, princess, convert to Christianity

== Plot summary ==
As performed at the New Theatres in Philadelphia and Baltimore, 1794.

In a harem, Fetnah tells her maid how she feels trapped and yearns for the freedom described by Rebecca. Meanwhile, Ben Hassan lies to Rebecca that her ransom has not arrived and suggests she become another of his wives; she refuses, remaining steadfast to her values and her faith in her countrymen. Ben Hassan is then approached by Frederic, who represents a number of slaves and has an agreement with Ben Hassan to buy their freedom and a sailing vessel. Ben Hassan intends to betray them, but Frederic knows of his character and threatens death for treachery.

At the Dey's apartments, Zoriana and Olivia discuss an escape plan. Zoriana has fallen in love with Henry and smuggled valuables to buy his freedom; they agree to meet him. Henry meets Zoriana and Olivia in the garden. He reunites with Olivia, and though Zoriana feels pangs of jealousy she takes the Christian path and wishes their happiness. After Henry leaves, however, Olivia decides to remain and placate the dey's anger, insisting that Zoriana take her place with Henry and her father.

The next morning, Frederic is in the garden, having become lost while trying to follow Henry and lamenting his ill fortune at love. Fetnah enters and Frederic mistakes her for Zoriana, which she exploits in hopes of being freed. The dey arrives with servants and is about to arrest Frederic when Fetnah concocts a story of Frederic rescuing her from plunderers. Escaping that danger, Frederic overhears Ben Hassan requesting an urgent audience with the dey. Frederic convinces Ben Hassan that a servant has betrayed him and that he must be rid of any evidence or suffer the dey's wrath. Meanwhile, in her apartment, Fetnah obtains clothing of the dey's son and thinks to use them to escape.

Sebastian takes Frederic, Henry and the slaves to a grotto where they can hide. Fetnah arrives in disguise and the slaves first want to kill her, but Frederic protects her when she is revealed. Fetnah tells Frederic that she loves him and begs that Rebecca be saved.

Sebastian leads a party of armed slaves to Ben Hassan's house. Fearing violence, Rebecca and Augustus flee to the garden while Ben Hassan disguises himself as a woman, his face concealed. Mistaking Ben Hassan for Rebecca, the rescue party carry him away. Rebecca returns and finds Ben Hassan's pocketbook with a small fortune in bills of exchange – including that of her own ransom – and rejoices that she can now free many slaves.

Zoriana has misgivings about Olivia and Henry's mutual love being squandered. Henry arrives, and she leads him to Constant's prison.

At the grotto, Sebastian declares his adoration for Rebecca and lifts the veil to bestow a kiss. Exposed, Ben Hassan claims to be an old woman held many years in captivity, which Sebastian accepts and allows the dignity of replacing the veil.

The dey's palace is alerted due to Fetnah and Olivia's disappearances, and Muley's guards capture Constant's rescue party. Muley orders them put to lengthy torture, but Olivia enters and claims total responsibility, offering her life for theirs. Muley swears to Mohammad to give them life, freedom, and transportation to their homelands if Olivia will convert and become his wife. Olivia agrees, but plans to spare herself from shame by killing herself immediately after the marriage ceremony.

Olivia is reunited with the prisoners before the ceremony. Rebecca enters and tries to buy Olivia's freedom but Muley refuses. Rebecca shares her story and the family is reunited. As Rebecca invites Muley to let his vengeance fall upon them, a slave uprising strikes Algiers. Muley's slaves hesitate to execute the family, and his palace is overtaken by Frederic, Augustus, Sebastian, and armed slaves, who have Ben Hassan with them.

Sebastian would have Muley put in chains but Frederic refuses to enslave another, and Rebecca states that Christian law forbids slavery. For profiting on the misery of others, Ben Hassan would be left to the mob, but Fetnah stays by her father in need. Muley asks them to stay with him and teach him to overcome his ancestral traditions and personal faults. Henry and Olivia praise their native land, wishing it to spread liberty and prosperity to every nation through peace or through force.

== Historical context ==
Rowson's play is a story based on events of the period that led to the First Barbary War (1801–1805). These events begin in 1785 with the American merchant ships, the Maria and the Dauphin, which were captured along the North African coast by seamen from the Algerian province of the Ottoman Empire. Twenty-one American sailors and passengers were taken hostage and worked as slaves. Often the hostages would be subject to daily labor and servitude, and in few cases also worked as advisors to ranking officials such as the dey.

The newly founded United States, severely lacking in its treasury and naval resources, denied ransom payment to the Dey of Algiers for the hostages who, in most cases, would have either died from the plague or would have remained in their captivity for over ten years. The number of Americans in captivity was raised to roughly 120 when eleven American ships were seized by the Algerians in 1793. News of these captures took the interest of the American public.

The script of Slaves in Algiers was published, in part, toward raising some of the one million dollars used to free the actual US captives in 1796.

== Performances ==
Slaves in Algiers is Susanna Rowson's first and only surviving play. It was first staged at the New Theatre (later renamed the Chestnut Street Theatre) in Philadelphia, Pennsylvania, on June 30, 1794. It then saw occasional performances in Baltimore and New York City. The play was revived in 1816 in Boston, following the Second Barbary War (1815).

== Reception ==
Critical response to the play, both historical and modern, has been generally negative. Journalist William Cobbett (1763–1835) condemned the play, dismaying that so inspired, women might one day hold office in Congress. A consensus of modern scholars is that the play lacks literary merit but holds value in capturing the politics of its time.

== Social relevance ==
In several moments of the play, female characters are shown being just as capable and intelligent as their male counterparts. Playwright Susanna Rowson was considered a feminist during her lifetime. Using this work and her other writings, she helped transform the idea of women's participation in public and society. She went so far as to address the women in the audiences at the end of this play's performances to ask for their opinions on the show, giving them a forum to voice themselves over men. However, Rowson did not advocate for equal rights. She wanted women to realize that they could have larger roles in society, but she never stated that women had to be equal to men. She even made a note that women had to appear proper and respectable. Rowson simply advocated for women to have a more public lifestyle than they had at that time.

"...the sons and daughters of liberty [Americans], take justice, truth, and mercy, for their leaders, when they list under her glorious banners."

— Rebecca, act 1, scene 2

Her play also helped fuel the growth of American patriotism and nationalism. After the American Revolution, many of the new country's citizens questioned the values of the country and its people. In this play, Rowson portrays Christians as righteous freedom fighters. It implies that these characters are the morally right and good characters and that their religion and belief were a reason for their survival. With this play, many new Americans who were early Christians and Puritans felt justified in their beliefs and morals, and proud to be American.

The play belongs to the captivity narrative genre, a classic American war fantasy in which the liberation of prisoners is used as a metaphor for American righteousness. The genre is frequently evoked in calls to war, and the play shows the deep-seated desires for American imperialism in the Islamic world. In the journal Common Place, Anne G. Myles compares the play's conclusion with US President George W. Bush's 2003 State of the Union Address:

Henry: where liberty has established her court–where the warlike Eagle extends his glittering pinions in the sunshine of prosperity.
Olivia: Long, long may that prosperity continue–may Freedom spread her benign influence thro' every nation, 'til the bright Eagle, united with the dove and the olive branch, waves high, the acknowledged standard of the world.

Translation:

Bush: America is a strong nation and honorable in the use of our strength. We exercise power without conquest, and we sacrifice for the liberty of strangers. Americans are a free people, who know that freedom is the right of every person and the future of every nation. (Note: Bush's speech was given less than two months before the US invaded Iraq.)

Myles notes that the rhetoric shows a shared dream across the breadth of US history, in which "the world will become an empire of liberty under the leadership of the United States". Myles states that the message of equality "never escapes or contradicts the play's imperialism", that flaunting the freedom of American women was—and remains—a means of claiming America's superiority over the Islamic world.

The play also exhibits xenophobia and anti-Semitism. American Studies professor Andrew Gross holds that the Jewish character, Ben Hassan, symbolizes the cruel side to commerce and "served as scapegoat for the American discomfort with its own failures", notably regarding the African slave trade. Jews were symbolically sacrificed for the sinful hypocrisy between American values and practices at the time. (Note: US President Thomas Jefferson owned slaves while waging war to free white slaves in North Africa, and in the same year he ordered the invasion of Tripoli he refused to recognize Haiti, the second new-world republic which had gained independence through a slave rebellion.) (Note: William Eaton, the US consul general to Tunis (1797–1803) stated that "Barbary is hell—So, alas, is all America south of Pennsylvania.") At the play's conclusion Ben Hassan is the only character beyond redemption, lacking the empathy that makes people human. Also by the play's end, the interracial and interfaith romances are all abandoned. Though Algiers is transformed by the American plan, Gross feels there is a call for distinct national and racial boundaries which leaves Jews with no place to go. The stateless Jews, Gross reasons, are equated with the enslaved Africans and "beyond the boundaries of human feeling."
