= J. H. Colton =

United-States geographer and mapmaker

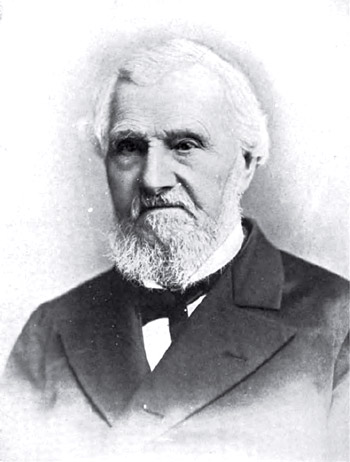
- Born: Joseph Hutchins Colton; July 5, 1800; Longmeadow, Massachusetts
- Died: July 29, 1893 (aged 93)
- Known for: Cartography

Joseph Hutchins Colton (July 5, 1800 – July 29, 1893), founded an American mapmaking company which was an international leader in the map publishing industry between 1831 and 1890.

Colton was born in Longmeadow, Massachusetts, and moved to New York in 1831 to establish his firm. For the first ten years, Colton licensed the use of maps from established cartographers such as David H. Burr. Colton also employed some of the preeminent engravers of the time, including Burr, Samuel Stiles, John Disturnell and D. Griffing Johnson. Colton went on to create railroad maps, immigrant guides, folding pocket maps, large wall maps, and elaborate atlases.

J.H. Colton Company maps were printed using engraved steel plates, which produced higher quality prints than maps made with less costly wax engravings. They were often individually hand watercolored and were recognized for their decorative borders.

In the early 1850s Colton brought his two sons into the business, George Woolworth Colton (1827–1901) and Charles B. Colton (1832–1916).

In 1857, Colton was awarded a $25,000 commission by the Government of Bolivia to produce 2500 large maps of the country. Colton completed the contract, but was not paid by Bolivia, which was mired in revolution. Colton pursued a high-profile legal case against the Bolivian and Peruvian governments and after considerable delay was awarded $100,000 in compensation and damages.

In 1859, Colton published a Hand-book to Kansas Territory and the Rocky Mountains' Gold Region; accompanied by reliable maps and a preliminary treatise on the pre-emption laws of the United States, by James Redpath and Richard J. Hinton.

Maps published by J.H. Colton can be found in the historical archives of most of the U.S. states, (including Mississippi, Louisiana, and Maryland) and of many national governments (including the United States Library of Congress). They are also found in university and museum collections (including at University of Kansas, University of Texas, and Princeton University).

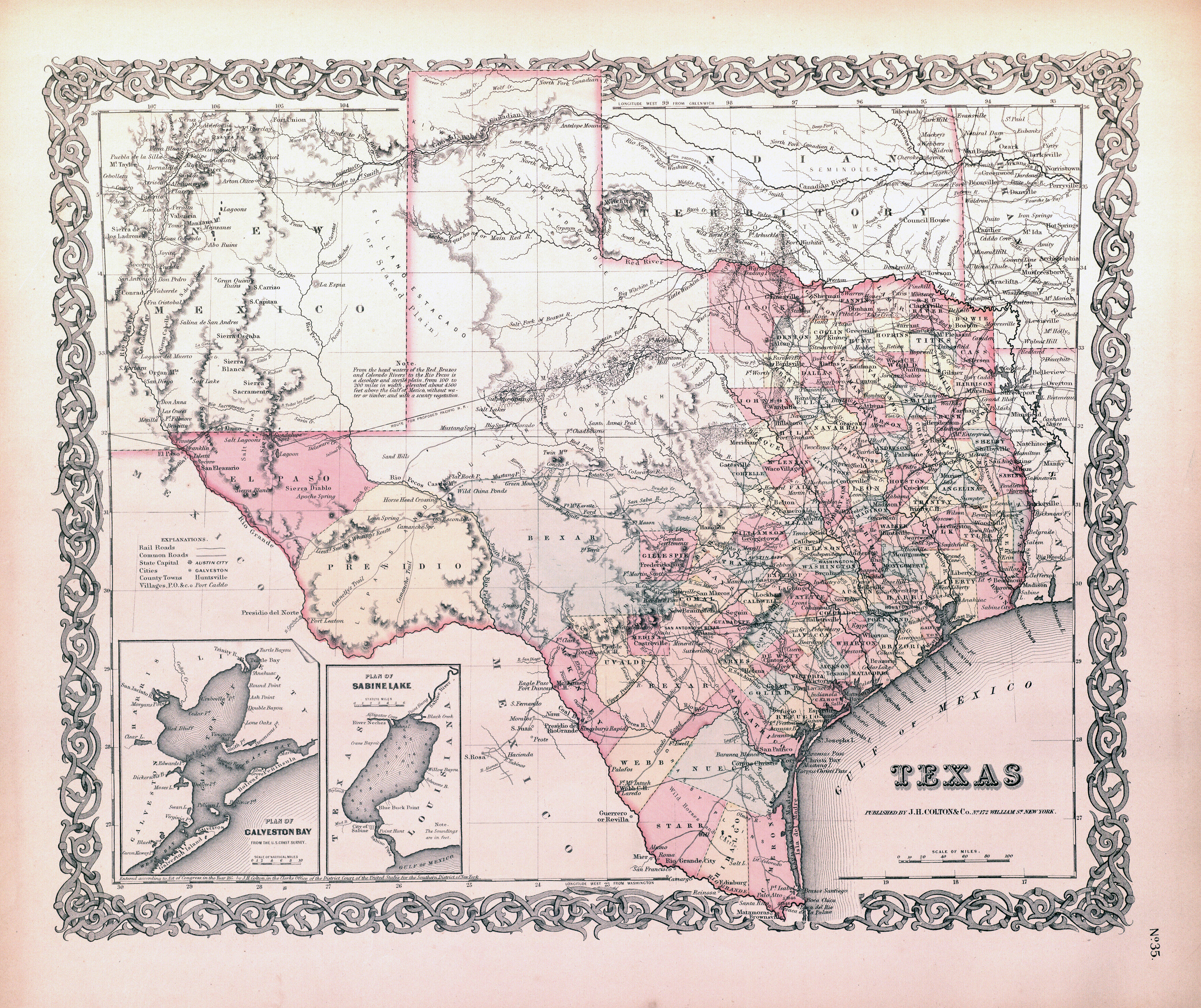
1854 Map of Texas

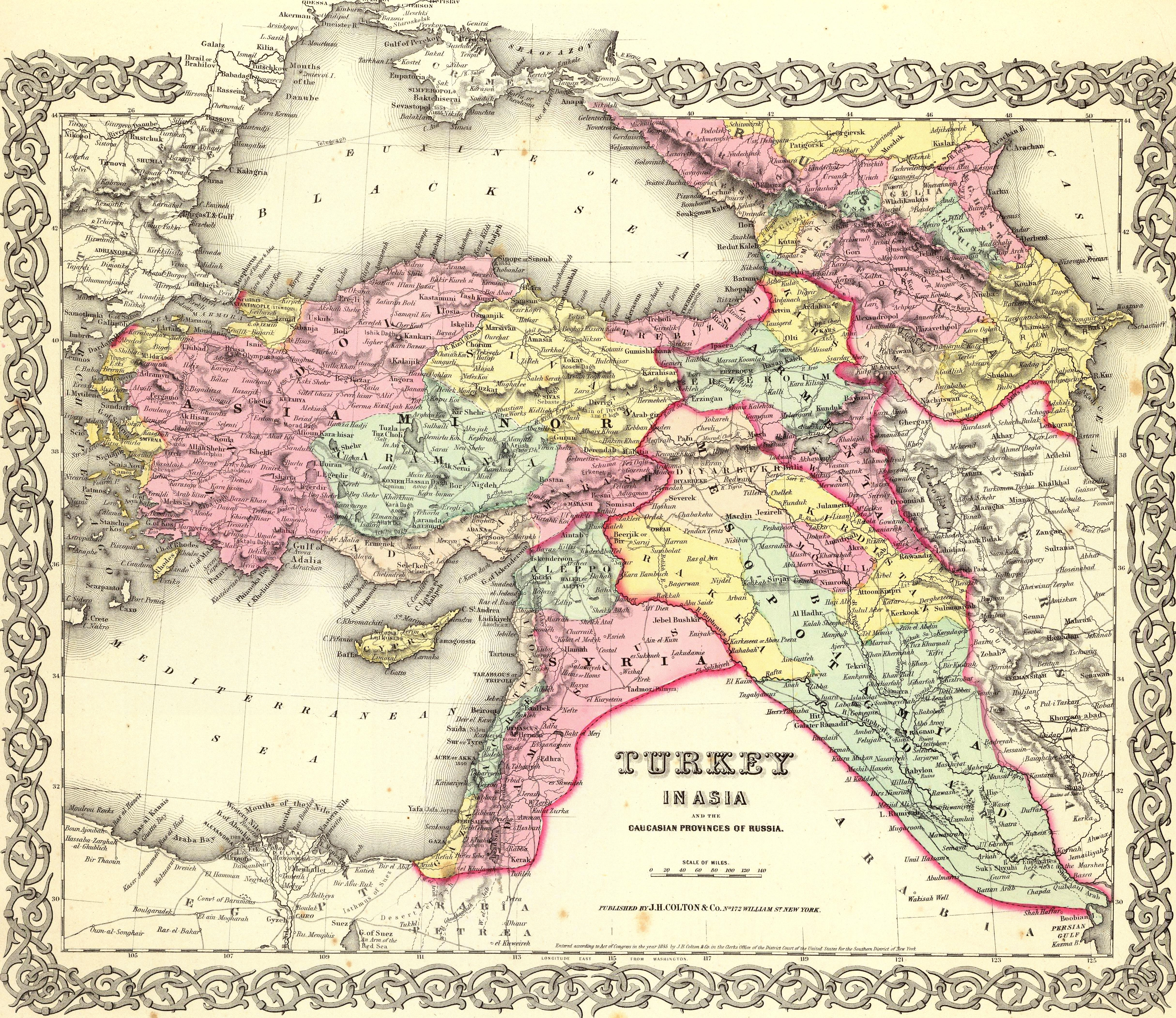
1855 Atlas Map of Turkey

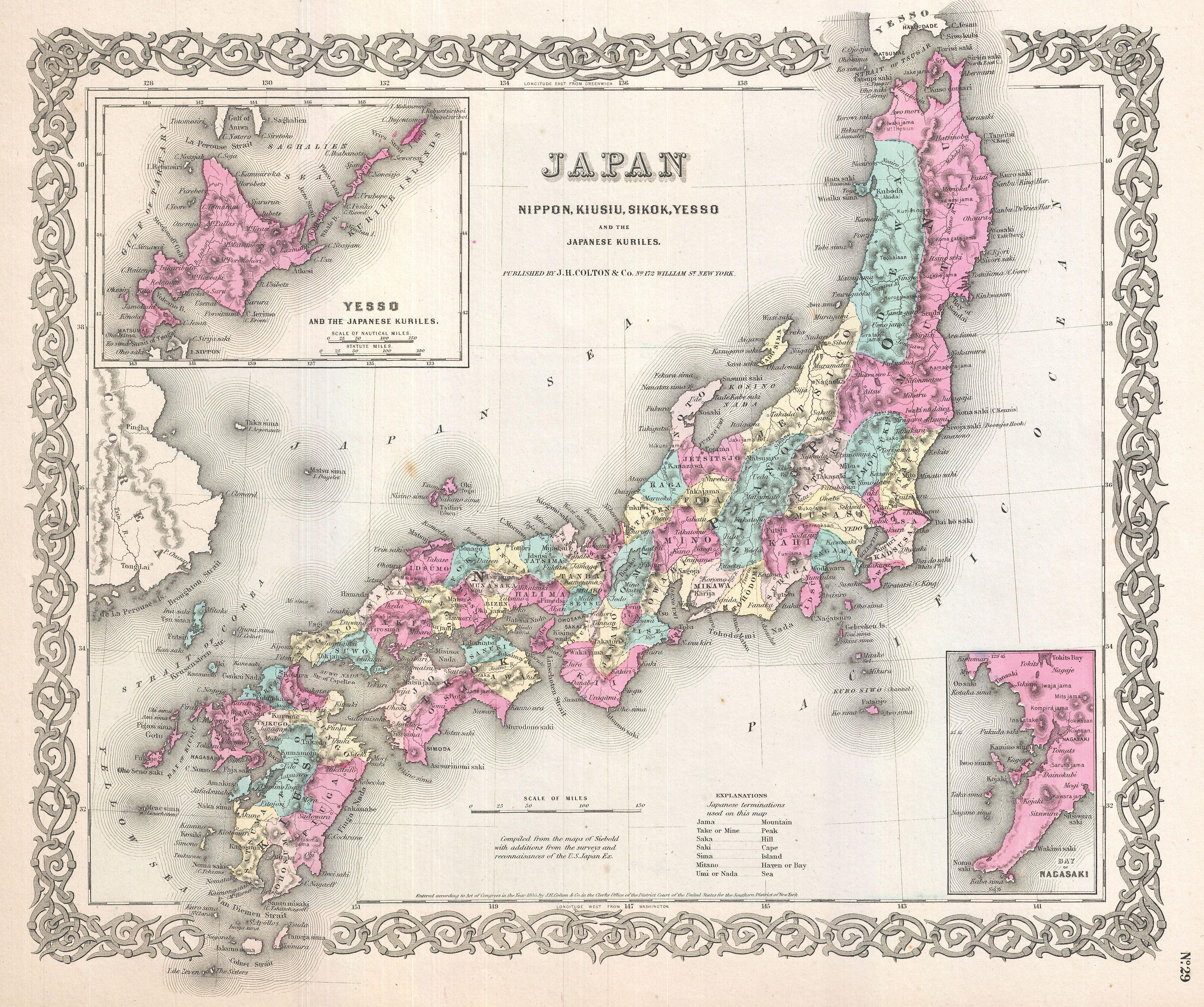
1855 Map of Japan

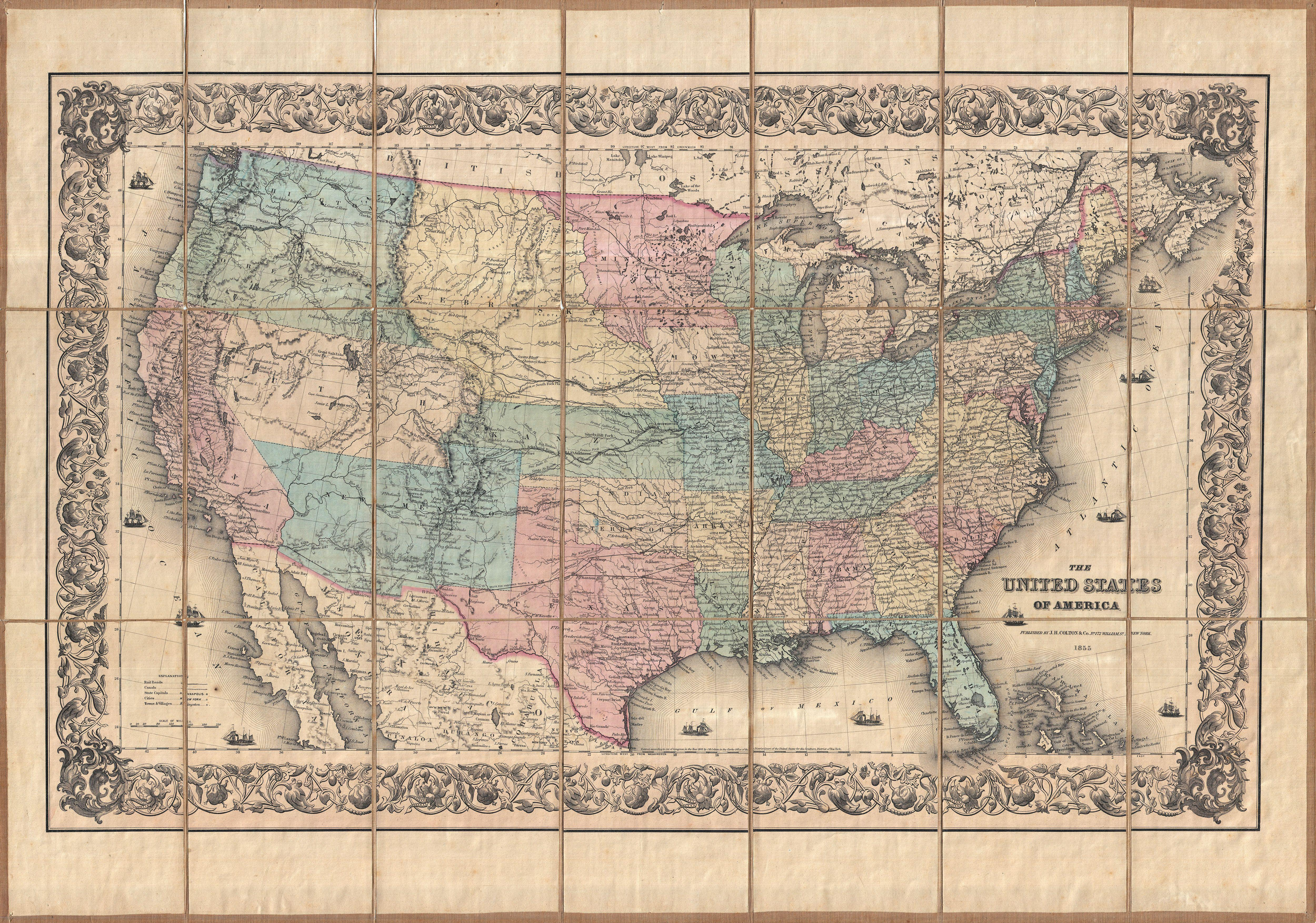
1855 Pocket Map of U.S.

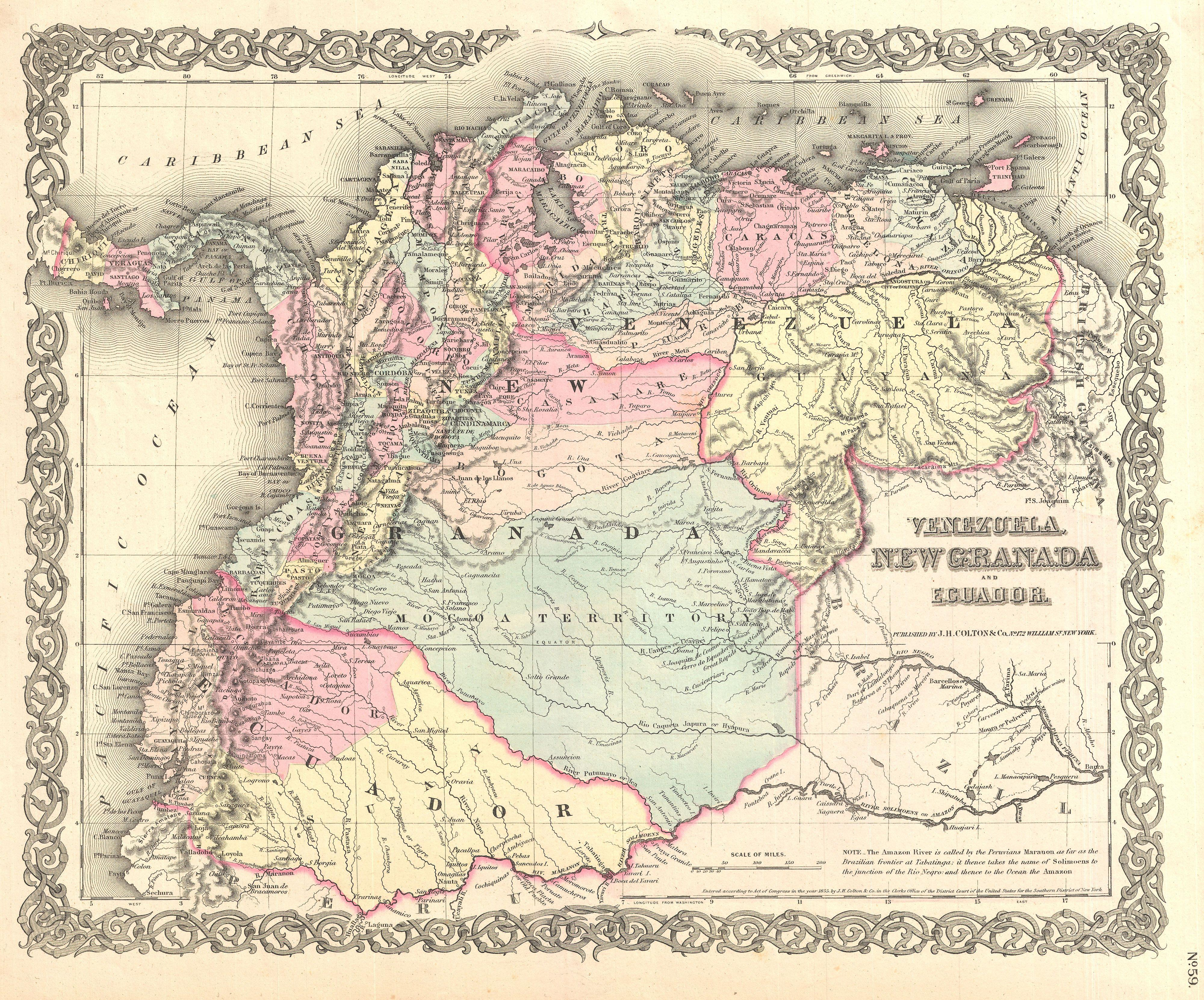
1855 Map of Venezuela, New Granada & Ecuador

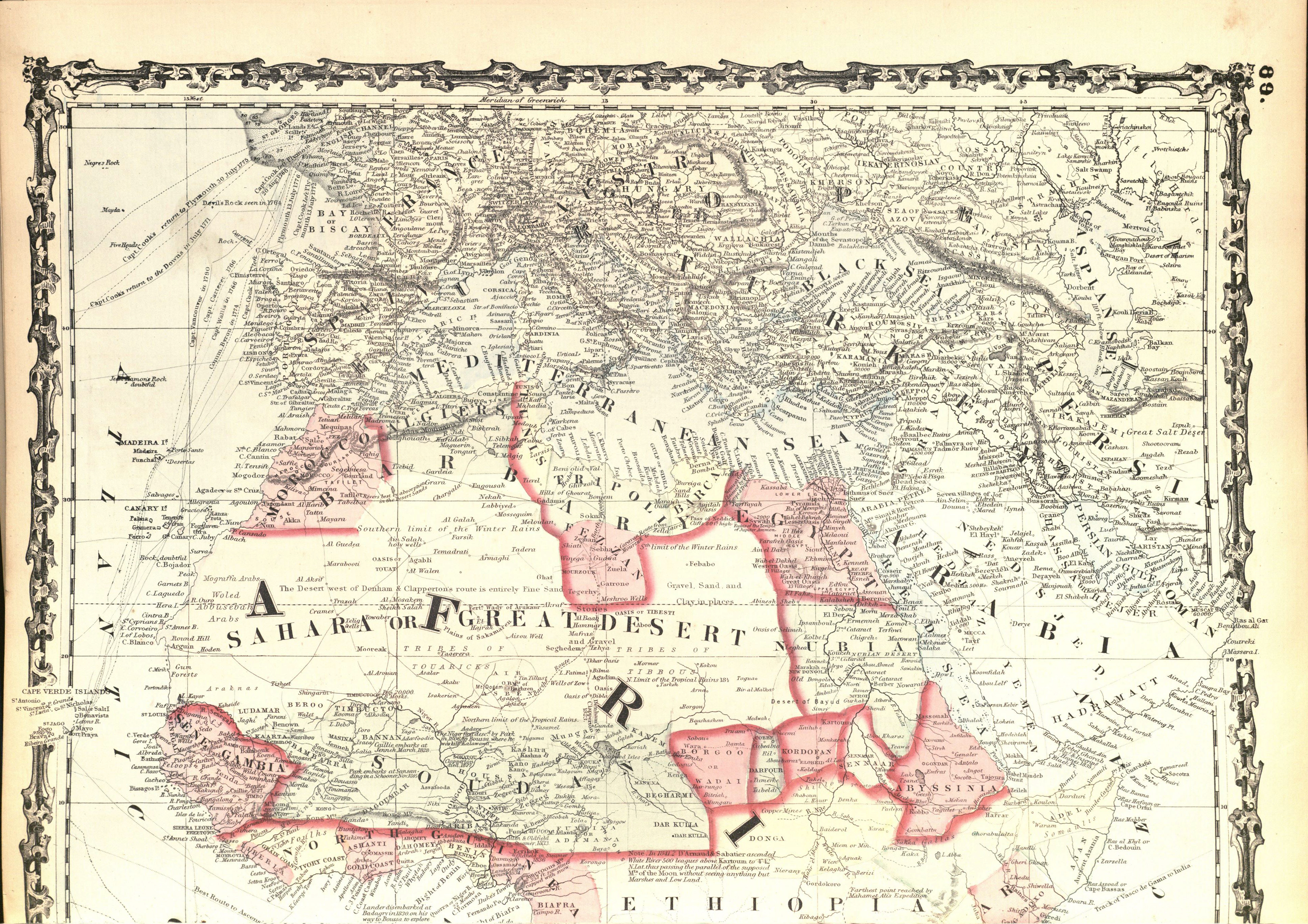
1862 Map of Africa

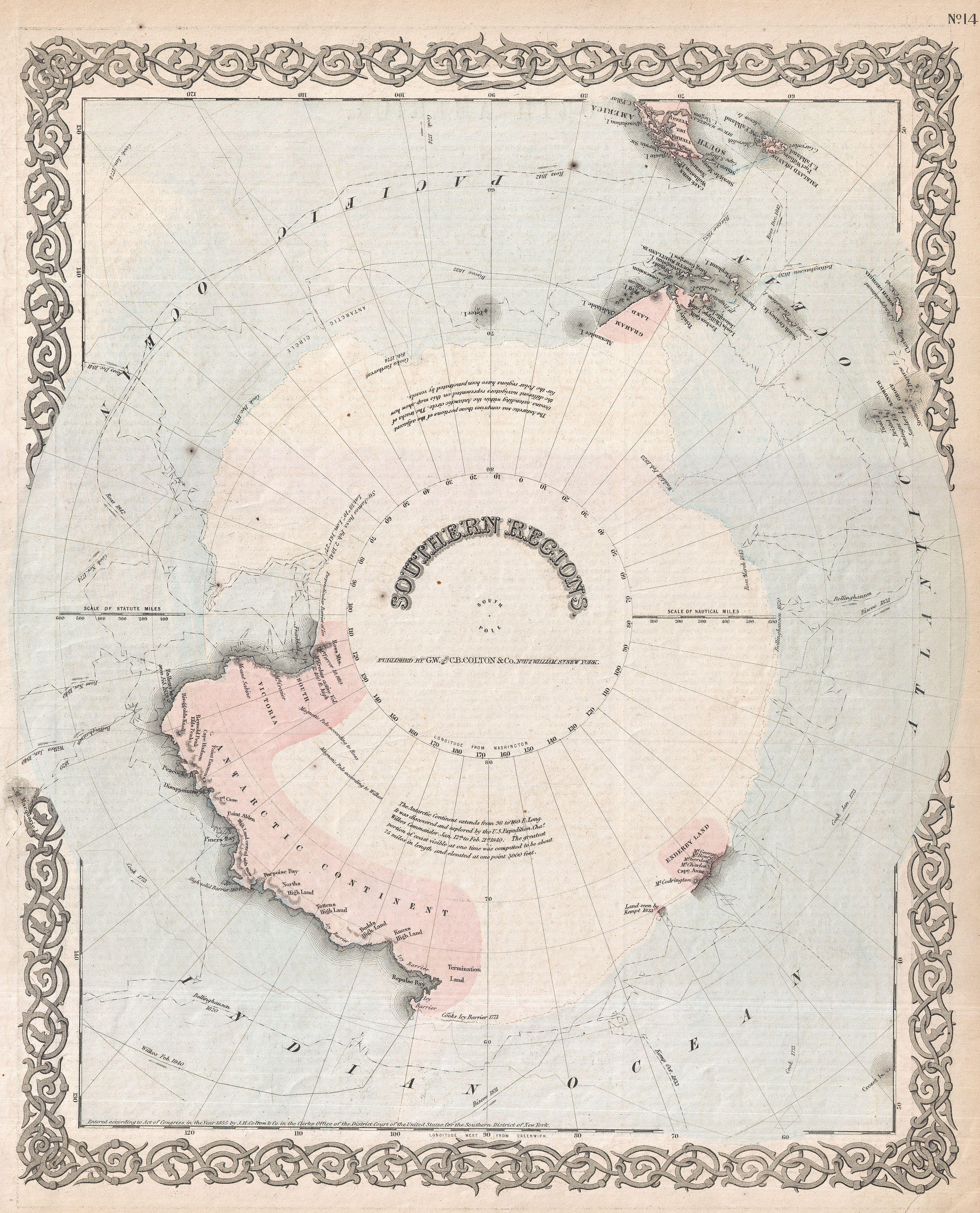
1872 Atlas Map of Antarctica
