= Nella Brown Pond =

American dramatic reader

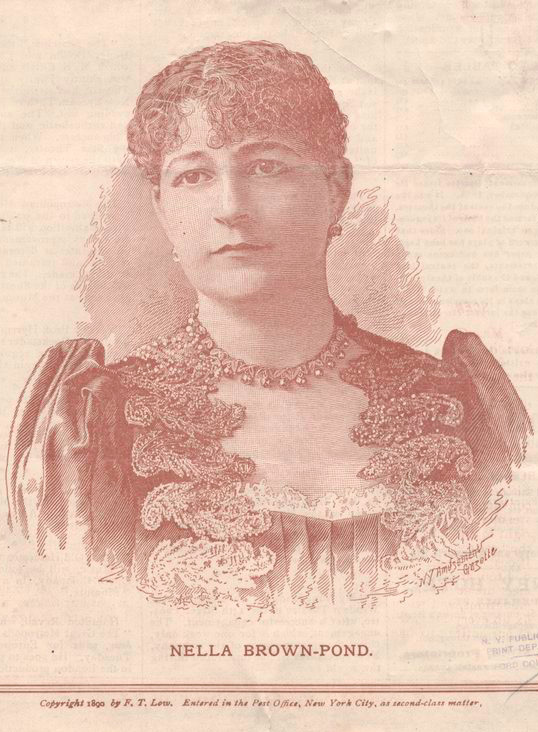
- Born: Nella Frank Brown; May 7, 1858; Springfield, Massachusetts
- Died: September 14, 1893 (aged 35); Boston, Massachusetts
- Occupation: Dramatic reader
- Spouse: Ozias W. Pond

Nella Frank Brown Pond (May 7, 1858 – September 14, 1893) was an American dramatic reader and lecturer in Boston, Massachusetts.

== Early life ==
Nella Frank Brown was born in Springfield, Massachusetts, on May 7, 1858. Her father, Dr. Enoch Brown, was an eminent physician in Springfield, for some years, and afterward moved to New York, where he died, while Pond was quite young. The family then went to live in Middletown, Connecticut, and finally became permanent residents of Boston.

== Career ==
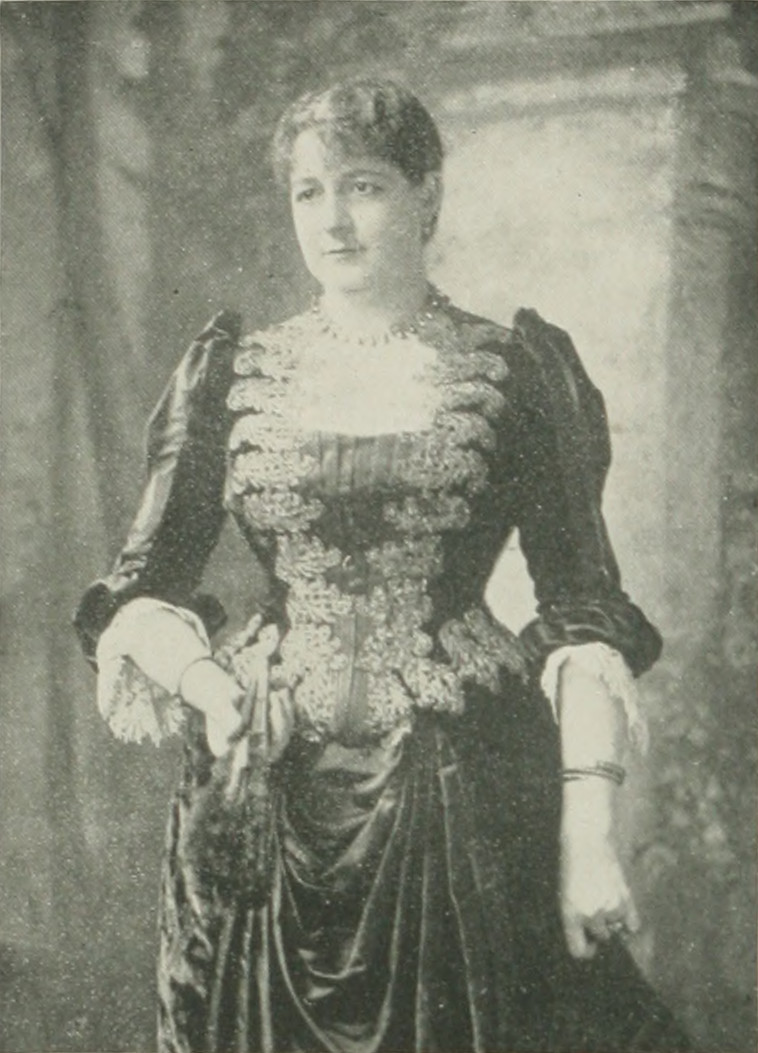
Nella Brown Pond, A woman of the century

Nella Brown Pond was an accomplished reader in the lyceum movement, and was among the foremost American women in this field.

In Boston, Pond's natural dramatic talent became known to a few friends, who induced her to become a member of the Park Dramatic Company, an amateur organization of great excellence. She appeared for the first time as Margaret Elmore in Love's Sacrifice and achieved instantaneous success. She remained with the company during that season. Her dramatic talent made her very popular and brought her recognition from prominent professionals. She received numerous offers from managers of leading metropolitan theaters, but refused them all, declining to go on the stage.

Mrs. Thomas Barry, then leading lady of the Boston Theater, became greatly interested in her and advised that she read at lyceums, prophesying that she would become celebrated. With Mrs. Barry's encouragement, an engagement was scheduled with the Redpath Lyceum Bureau, and Pond at once assumed a position and gained a popularity which increased during the following seasons.

== Personal life ==
In 1880, Nella Brown Pond became the wife of Ozias W. Pond, of Boston, a well-known manager of musical and literary celebrities. Her husband died in February 1892.

She died on September 14, 1893, in Boston, from typhoid fever.
