= Thayer & Eldridge =

19th century Boston publishing firm

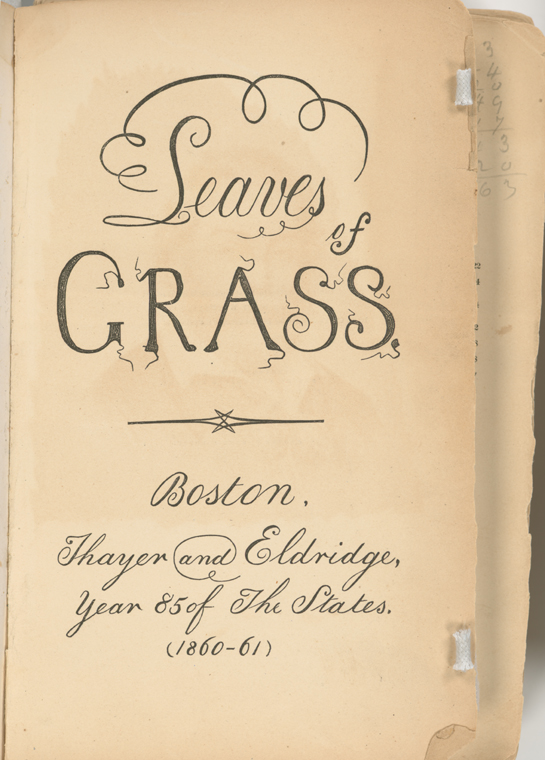
Whitman's Leaves of Grass, 1860 (New York Public Library)

Thayer & Eldridge (c.1860–1861) was a publishing firm in Boston, Massachusetts, established by William Wilde Thayer and Charles W. Eldridge. During its brief existence the firm issued works by James Redpath, Charles Sumner, and Walt Whitman, before going bankrupt in 1861.

== Published by the firm ==
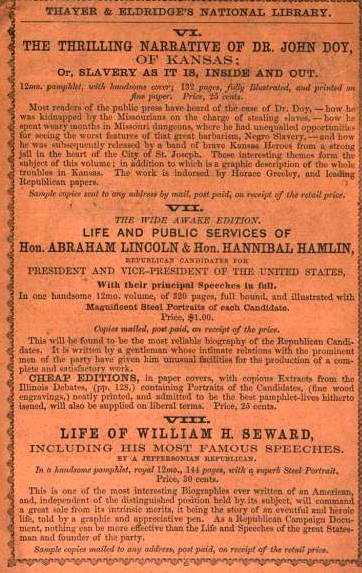
Advertisement for Thayer & Eldridge's "National Library," 1860

- Rufus B. Sage. Rocky Mountain Life: Or, Startling Scenes and Perilous Adventures in the Far West, during an Expedition of Three Years. 1859.
- Walt Whitman. Leaves of Grass, 3rd ed. 1860
- Leaves of Grass Imprints. 1860
- James Redpath. The public life of Capt. John Brown. 1860.
- James Redpath, ed. Echoes of Harper's Ferry. 1860.
- Charles Sumner. The Barbarism of Slavery: Speech of Mr. Charles Sumner on the bill for the admission of Kansas as a free state, in the United States Senate, June 4, 1860.
- William T. Adams. Marrying a beggar: or The Angel in disguise, and other tales. 1860.
- William Douglas Conner. Harrington; a Story of True Love. 1860.
- C.W. Dana. The Great West, Or The Garden of the World: Its History, Its Wealth, Its Natural Advantages, and Its Future. 1861.
- A Son of Temperance ed. Thrilling Scenes in Social Life or The Opposite Effects of Vice and Virtue. 1860

== Contracted but not published because of bankruptcy ==
- Incidents in the Life of a Slave Girl, by Harriet Jacobs under pseudonym, edited by L. Maria Child
- Guide to Hayti, by James Redpath
- Asphodel; a Novel, by Ada Clare
