= Lucy Temple =

1828 novel by Susanna Rowson

Lucy Temple is a novel by British-American author Susanna Rowson. It was first published posthumously (together with a memoir of the author by Samuel Lorenzo Knapp) in 1828 under the title Charlotte's Daughter, or, The Three Orphans. It was a sequel to Rowson's extremely popular novel Charlotte Temple. Lucy Temple is the daughter of Charlotte Temple, the main character in the first novel.

== Plot ==
The plot centers around the three orphans under the charge of the clergyman Mr. Matthews. One of them, Lucy, the daughter of Charlotte Temple, falls in love with Lieutenant Franklin, only to later discover that he is her half-brother, as he is the son of Montraville, Charlotte's seducer. Having her plans for marriage thwarted, Lucy then devotes her life to educating children and caring for the poor.
