= James Redpath =

Anglo-American journalist and activist (1833–1891)

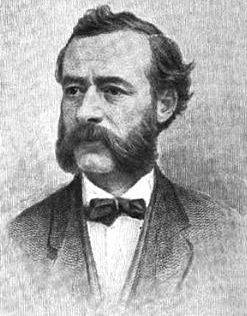
- Born: August 24, 1833; Berwick-upon-Tweed, Northumberland, England
- Died: February 10, 1891 (aged 57); New York City, U.S.
- Occupations: Journalist, publisher, antislavery activist
- Writing career
- Subjects: Slavery in the United States, John Brown
- Notable works: The Roving Editor: or, Talks with Slaves in the Southern States (1859); The Public Life of Capt. John Brown (1860); Echoes of Harper's Ferry (1860)

James Redpath (August 24, 1833 – February 10, 1891) was an American journalist and anti-slavery activist.

== Life ==
In 1848 or 1849, Redpath and his family emigrated from Scotland to a farm near Kalamazoo, Michigan. He worked as a printer in Kalamazoo and Detroit, where he wrote antislavery articles under the pseudonym "Berwick." Then he worked as a reporter for Horace Greeley's New-York Tribune. An early assignment at the Tribune involved compiling "Facts of Slavery", a regular series of articles gathered from Southern newspaper exchanges. Beginning in March 1854, he traveled in the American South to examine slavery for himself, interviewing slaves and collecting material. It appeared early in 1859 as The Roving Editor: or, Talks with Slaves in the Southern States, dedicated to "Old Hero" Captain John Brown. The book's production costs were covered by prominent antislavery philanthropist Gerrit Smith.

In 1855, Redpath moved to the Kansas-Missouri border and reported for a Free Soil newspaper, the Missouri Democrat, on the dispute over slavery in Kansas Territory. For the next three years, he was active in Kansas affairs, engaging in politics, writing dispatches, securing support in New England for Free Soil settlers, and writing poetry about Kansas. In 1856, he interviewed John Brown just days after the massacre at Pottawatomie Creek. Redpath and Brown shared the same abolitionist views, and he became Brown's most fervent publicist. In addition to his abolitionist views, he also advocated reparations for slavery.

Redpath returned east from Kansas in July 1858. During the Pike's Peak Gold Rush of 1859, he and fellow journalist Richard J. Hinton prepared a guidebook for gold prospectors, Hand-Book to Kansas Territory and the Rocky Mountains' Gold Region. It was hoped that the book would spur a greater number of Free Soil immigrants to settle in Kansas Territory, which included part of what later became Colorado.

In 1858, Brown encouraged Redpath to move to Boston to help rally support for his plan for a Southern slave insurrection. After the failure of John Brown's raid on Harpers Ferry (1859), Redpath wrote the first, and highly sympathetic, biography of the executed abolitionist, The Public Life of Capt. John Brown (1860). Announced on December 3, 1859, the day after Brown's execution, according to an advertisement from the publisher Thayer & Eldridge "a liberal percentage" of the profits were for Brown's family.

In 1860, Redpath toured Haiti as a reporter and returned to the United States as the official Haitian lobbyist for diplomatic recognition, which he secured within two years. He simultaneously served as director of Haiti's campaign to attract free black emigrants from the United States and Canada. John Brown Jr. worked under him in 1860. His Guide to Hayti (1860), available on the Internet Archive, is an anthology of articles by various authors on a wide range of Haitian subjects. Redpath hoped that the immigration of skilled blacks to Haiti would elevate conditions there and dispel racial prejudice in the United States. After the Civil War, he abandoned his ideas when he recognized that North American blacks preferred to remain at home.

In 1863 and 1864, following the failure of Redpath's Boston publishers Thayer & Eldridge, he set up his own firm and began the series "Books for the Times," which included William Wells Brown's The Black Man, John R. Beard's Toussaint L'Ouverture, and Louisa May Alcott's Hospital Sketches. In 1864, he published another series of cheap paperbound books, titled "Books for the Campfires", principally intended for distribution to Union Army soldiers. Later that year he abandoned publishing to serve as a war correspondent with the armies of George Henry Thomas and William Tecumseh Sherman in Georgia and South Carolina. In February 1865, federal military authorities appointed him the first superintendent of public schools in the Charleston, South Carolina, region. He soon had more than 100 instructors at work teaching 3,500 African-American and white students. He also founded an orphan asylum.

In May 1865 in Charleston, Redpath organized what has been called the first-ever Memorial Day service, to honor buried Union Army dead there. In 2014, however, this designation was disputed by Bellware and Gardiner in The Genesis of the Memorial Day Holiday in America. They point out that it was actually a cemetery dedication, not meant to be repeated annually and not unlike the one that took place at Gettysburg, Pennsylvania, in 1863, that debuted Lincoln's famous address. David Blight, the main proponent of this thesis, confessed that he has no evidence that this cemetery dedication influenced General Logan to inaugurate the annual holiday. Bellware and Gardiner credit Mary Ann Williams and the Ladies Memorial Association of Columbus, Georgia, as the true originators of the holiday, though this is only one of many precedents from 1865-66 for the holiday, known for a time as "Decoration Day."

His reputation as a radical abolitionist and his tentative steps toward integrating South Carolina's schools caused worried military officials to replace Redpath and remove an irritation to Southern-born president Andrew Johnson.

=== Boston Lyceum Bureau ===
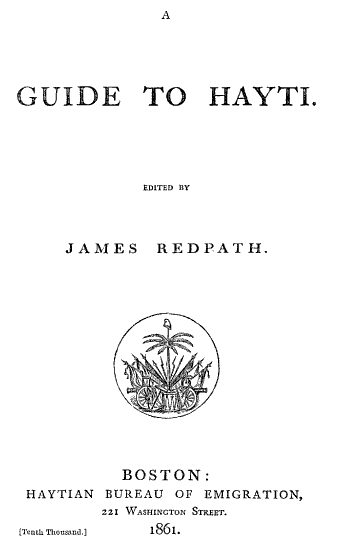
Redpath's A Guide to Hayti (Boston: Haytian Bureau of Emigration, 221 Washington Street, 1861)

In 1868, Redpath started one of the first professional lecturing bureaus in the country, the Boston Lyceum Bureau. Later known as the Redpath Bureau, it supplied speakers and performers for lyceums all across the country. It represented figures such as Mark Twain, Julia Ward Howe, Charles Sumner, Ralph Waldo Emerson, Wendell Phillips, Henry Ward Beecher, Susan B. Anthony, Nella Brown Pond, Lew Wallace, and Frederick Douglass. The Redpath Bureau became the most prominent and successful agency of its kind. Leland Powers, a faculty at the Bureau, established his own school after Redpath left.

Redpath sold his interest in the Bureau in 1875 and lived alternately in Washington, D.C., and New York, when not traveling. At the end of the decade, his health declined but, in 1880–81, he reported on famine and the land war in western Ireland. Redpath was deeply affected by the extreme poverty of much of rural Ireland and he convinced his friend and fellow-abolitionist David Ross Locke to support Irish nationalism by taking him up the Galtee Mountains to show him the condition of smallholding mountain tenants. Redpath became an outspoken advocate of the cause of the Land League and Charles Stewart Parnell; pro-landlord commentators accused him of incitement to murder. Upon his return to the United States, he lectured on the lyceum circuit, wrote newspaper articles, and published Talks about Ireland and Redpath's Weekly, both devoted to Irish causes.

Redpath became editor of the North American Review in 1886. He died in 1891, shortly after being run over by a horse-drawn trolley in New York.

== Works ==
- Redpath, James (1859). The Roving Editor; or, Talks with Slaves in the Southern States. A. B. Burdick.
- Redpath, James; Hinton, Richard J. (1859). Hand-book to Kansas Territory and the Rocky Mountains' Gold Region; accompanied by reliable maps and a preliminary treatise on the pre-emption laws of the United States. New York: J. H. Colton.
- Redpath, James (1860). The Public Life of Capt John Brown. Thayer & Eldridge.
- Redpath, James (1860). Echoes of Harper's Ferry. Thayer & Eldridge.
- Redpath, James (1861). A Guide to Hayti. G.W. Colton.
- Redpath, James (1881). Talks about Ireland. P. J. Kenedy.

== Further reading (most recent first) ==
- McKivigan, John R. (2008). Forgotten Firebrand: James Redpath and the Making of Nineteenth-Century America. Ithaca, New York: Cornell University Press. ISBN 978-0801446733.
- McKivigan, John R. "James Redpath" in: Encyclopedia of Antislavery and Abolition. Greenwood Publishing Group, 2007
- Koontz, John P. "James Redpath" in: Writers of the American Renaissance: an A-to-Z guide. Greenwood Publishing Group, 2003
- Hart, Jim A. "James Redpath, Missouri Correspondent," Missouri Historical Review, 57.1 (1962–63): 70–78.
- Boyd, Willis D. (October 1955). "James Redpath and American Negro Colonization in Haiti, 1860-1862". The Americas. 12 (2): 169–182. doi:10.2307/979617. JSTOR 979617. S2CID 144323055.
- Horner, Charles F. The Life of James Redpath and the Development of the Modern Lyceum. New York: Barse and Hopkins, 1926. online
- "James Redpath and the Pioneer Bureau he Founded." Lyceum Magazine. Aug. 1922.
- Cyclopædia of American Biography. 1915. Google books
- The Twentieth Century Biographical Dictionary of Notable Americans. 1904. Google books
- Pond, James Burton. Eccentricities of Genius: Memories of Famous Men and Women of the Platform and Stage. NY: G.W. Dillingham, 1900. Internet Archive
