= Charlotte Temple =

1791 novel by Susanna Rowson

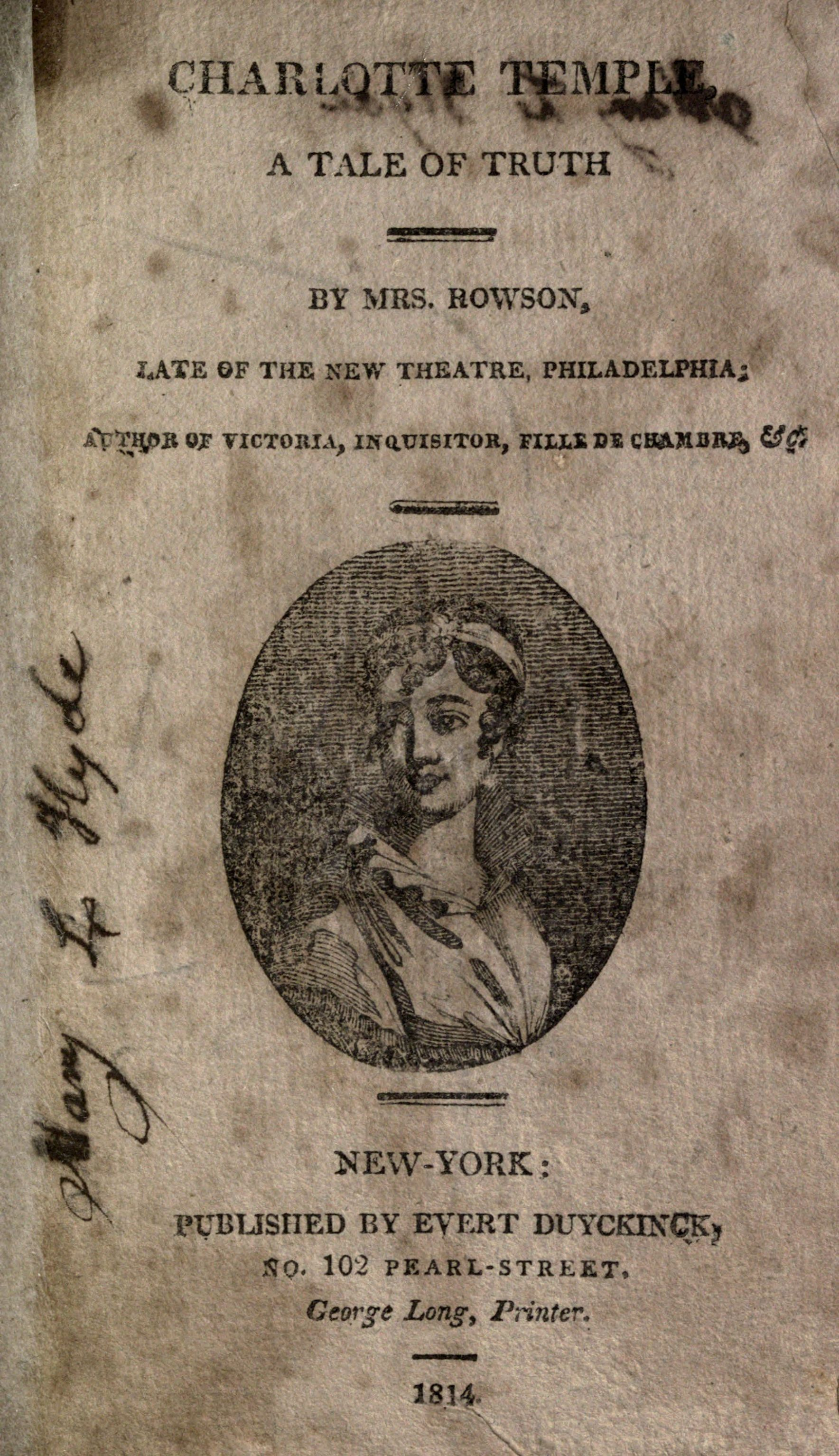
Title page of 1814 edition

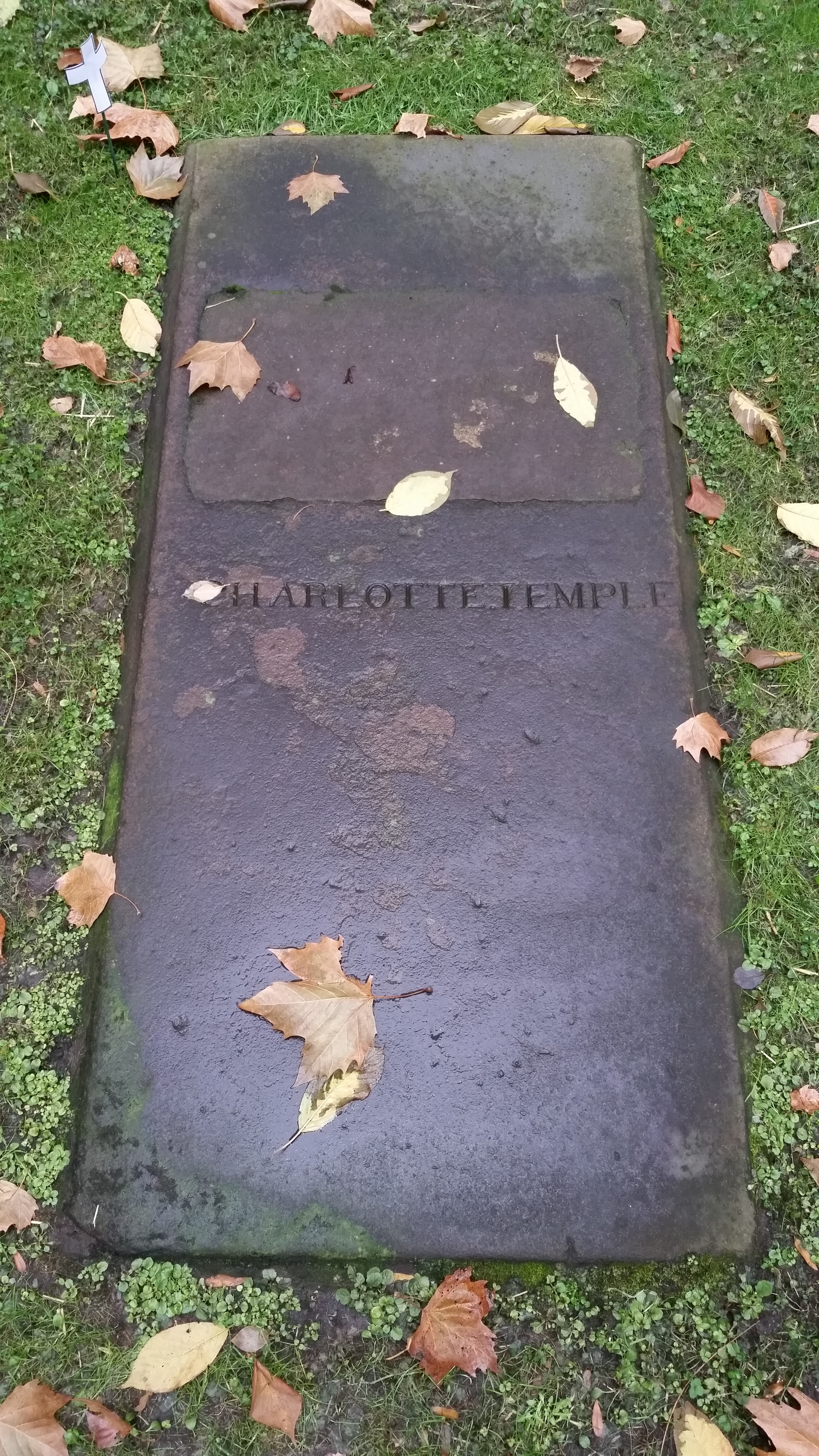
Vault stone in the Trinity Church graveyard, but no one knows if anyone is actually interred in the vault.

Charlotte Temple is a novel by British-American author Susanna Rowson, originally published in England in 1791 under the title Charlotte, A Tale of Truth. It tells the story of a schoolgirl, Charlotte Temple, who is seduced by a British officer and brought to America, where she is abandoned, pregnant, sick and in poverty. The first American edition was published in 1794 and the novel became a bestseller. It has gone through over 200 American editions. Late in life, the author wrote a sequel that was published posthumously.

== Synopsis ==
The book relates the tale of Charlotte Temple, who is enticed by a dashing soldier, John Montraville, to run away with him, but after they cross to America, he abandons her. It belongs to the seduction novel genre popular in early American literature.

The novel opens upon an unexpected encounter between the British Lieutenant Montraville and Charlotte Temple, a tall, elegant girl of 15. Montraville sets his mind on seducing Charlotte and succeeds with the help of his libertine friend Belcour and Mademoiselle La Rue, a teacher at the boarding school Charlotte attends. Mademoiselle La Rue had herself eloped from a convent with a young officer and "possessed too much of the spirit of intrigue to remain long without adventures." Montraville soon loses interest in the young girl and, being led by Belcour to believe in Charlotte's infidelity towards him, trusts Belcour to take care of Charlotte and the child she expects.

Following the advice of her new-found friend and neighbor Mrs. Beauchamp, Charlotte writes home to her mother. Her parents decide to receive her, her father even goes to New York to come get her. Without any financial support - Belcour does not give her the money Montraville put into his hands for her - Charlotte has to leave her house and, having walked to New York on a snowy winter's day, asks the former Mademoiselle La Rue, now Mrs. Crayton, for help. But the now wealthy woman pretends not to even know her for fear of her husband discovering the role she played in the girl's downfall. Charlotte is taken in by Mrs. Crayton's servant and soon gives birth to a child, Lucy. The doctor, however, has little hope of her recovering and asks a benevolent woman, Mrs. Beauchamp, for help. Mrs. Beauchamp is shocked when she recognizes Charlotte Temple in "the poor sufferer". The following day, Charlotte seems "tolerably composed" and Mrs. Beauchamp begins "to hope she might recover, and, in spite of her former errors, become a useful and respectable member of society", but the doctor tells her that nature is only "making her last effort" Just as Charlotte is lying on her deathbed, her father arrives and Charlotte asks him to take care of her child.

Upon returning to New York, Montraville goes in search of Belcour and Charlotte. Learning of her death and burial from a passing soldier, Montraville is filled with remorse for his part in her downfall, and angrily seeks out Belcour, killing him in a fight. Montraville suffers from melancholy for the rest of his life. Mr. Temple takes Charlotte's child back to England. The novel ends with the death of Mrs. Crayton (the former La Rue), who is discovered by Mr. Temple in a London doorway, separated from her husband, living in poverty, and repentant for her involvement in Charlotte's downfall. Mr. Temple admits her to a hospital, where she dies, "a striking example that vice, however prosperous in the beginning, in the end leads only to misery and shame."

== Sequel ==
The author wrote a sequel, telling the story of the daughter born to the unfortunate Charlotte, Lucy Temple. Still unpublished at the time of her 1824 death, it went to press in 1828 as Charlotte's Daughter, or, The Three Orphans, but later editions simply bore the daughter's name as title Lucy Temple.

Rowson also uses Charlotte Temple to reflect the increased silencing of women that occurred at the time. The formation of the middle class came about in America during the 18th century, and with this, the social expectations of women and femininity changed. Upper and middle-class women were reduced to the private sphere, “trapped behind the walls of their homes, they were increasingly forced into silence”. Charlotte becomes increasingly silenced by male authority throughout the novel which represents the oppression of women during this time. Scholar Susan Greenfield suggests that the immense popularity and cultural impact of the novel come from the relatability of the silencing of Charlotte's character. Greenfield also comments on the irony of this period's history as “the same culture which insisted that women be private and silent also generated women's unprecedented access to written words”. The 18th and 19th century gave way to the rise of female authors and female readers, as well as fictional novels as literature. Greenfield notes that “The novel was as much a middle-class product as the domestic female”. Where Rowson differs from many other female seduction novel authors is her style of writing. Epistolarity was a common style of many seduction novels, Rowson, however, chose to narrate the novel which is described as maternal, like “a very human mother advocating for the ruined child”. Jarenski proclaims that through Rowson's narrative intrusions she attempts to assert “ an authoritative female voice in a male-dominated public sphere”, creating a voice for the women who are silenced.

== Seduction novels ==
The seduction novel genre, of which Charlotte Temple is a part, grew in popularity after the American Revolutionary War. The American Revolution simultaneously gave women more opportunities and agency whilst highlighting the “feminine weakness, delicacy and incapacity”. The genre's female protagonists reflected the “same trepidation and endangerment that concerned the young country” making them easily identifiable with readers, primarily made up of young early American girls.

== Themes ==
=== Didacticism ===
Whilst representing and reflecting the fears and climate of a post-revolution America, Charlotte Temple also acts as a cautionary tale for young girls. Married women were seen as the "guardians of America's morality". The novels conveyed the didactic lesson that a woman who allows herself to be corrupted will lose her feminine influence rendering her unable to regulate men's conduct. During a commencement address at Columbia College in 1795 the influence of the virtuous women was said to be "a never-failing antidote against the most dangerous temptations of vice." Charlotte Temple and other seduction novels presented "virtuous woman" characters as "antidotes" to the disordered conduct of male characters like Montraville.

=== Agency ===
British law at the time would have allowed Charlotte, a 16-year-old girl, to elope, however she still required her parents' approval to formally get married. Lucia Hodgson say "Rowson's novel mounts a critique of the controversial Act for the Better Preventing of Clandestine Marriage". This act passed in 1753 in England (and New York) disallowed secret marriages. Critics of the act said it did little more than pave the path to a young woman's "ruin". To illustrate this point, most seduction novel characters, including Charlotte, were sixteen, an age where a young woman's emerging sexual agency would be in conflict with her father's control over her marriage. Tradition was still central to society and a woman's actions had serious consequences for her own and her family's social standings. In this way, Rowson also warns parents of their daughters’ potential sexual agency and the destruction that she could bring to the family, if she is allowed too much freedom. For young women without dowries, Charlotte's story is especially important. For them, the result of being seduced and losing their virtue is not just losing credibility, it also includes being left alone and homeless.

Rowson's characters Belcour and Montraville are symbolic of the dangers women faced as they are “attracted only to the most singularly virtuous of girls and [are] not satisfied until [they have] succeeded in ruining her”. These characters represented the common sentiment held by men at the time – that men are entitled to women and their bodies because women are the subordinate sex.

These feelings and contradictions are displayed in Charlotte Temple as it depicts “nightmare of dislocation, alienation and abandonment” reflecting the instability and chaos felt by Americans at the time. Throughout the novel, storm motifs are used to reflect this “temptation and its consequences”. Through this metaphor, Rowson explores this new problem faced by women and how they were not effectively equipped to dealing with them – for example Charlotte uses her freedom to seduce Montraville but does not know what to do in the aftermath when she is left pregnant and alone in America.

=== Education ===
Women's education in the United States during the 18th century was a highly contended issue. While some believed education for women would interfere with their roles as mothers and wives, especially given the likelihood of immodest conduct for students, the concept of Republican motherhood created social pressure for women to have some form of education most importantly because they were expected to prepare their sons for "public" life.

The tension surrounding women's education is encapsulated in Charlotte Temple as education is treated as both a virtue and a vice. It is at boarding school where Charlotte first meets Montraville while on a school outing; as academic scholar, Shelly Jarenski suggests that “the quasi-public sphere of school, distanced from the protection of home and family, is what allows Charlotte to be seen and ultimately victimised”. School is also culpable for Madame La Rue's influence over Charlotte, who uses her power as a teacher to manipulate Charlotte into ruining herself in the eyes of society. However, Jarenski also remarks that it is not education that fails Charlotte but her choices that dictate her fate. Through Charlotte's story, Rowson argues against those “who believed that education would ruin women for marriage and family life. Instead, they use their heroines' fates to show that it is precisely the refusal of available education that ruins women”. The subdued style in which Rowson encourages female education reflects the contemporary societal fears of women's education.

== Cultural impact ==
Susanna Rowson's Charlotte Temple is often described as America's first bestseller, and even the nation's first popular novel, selling more copies than any other novel in American history up until the middle of the 19th century. Published in 1794, Charlotte Temple emerged during the rise of America as a new nation, which saw the population boom after the Revolutionary War and an increased focus on the education of children in the late 18th century. Thus, the didactic novel reached the largely young and literate white youth and was met with enormous popularity due to its fast and entertaining plot. It was also intended as a sort of survival manual for “the perusal of the young and thoughtless of the fair sex”, educating young women on the moral disparity between genders and the male-oriented cultural institutions that fostered such divisiveness. Rowson's characterisation of Charlotte as a young woman whose plight was a product of circumstance was relatable to women who also struggled to be independent agents in this post-revolutionary culture.

Many archival copies contain inscriptions reveal the novel was exchanged between men and women, their sons and daughters, and even grandchildren. The volatility of the new nation spawned a general attitude of distrust, a lack of community, and a struggle to adapt to the rapidly changing country. High rates of urbanisation as well as the immigration of lower-class Europeans in the 18th century resulted in an extensive cultural transformation of America, with large proportions of the diverse society coming from rural lifestyles. Many new American readers undeniably related to Charlotte's plight in the new world as they too felt abandoned and alienated while coping with worldly change.

200 subsequent editions were published in the 50 years after its release, all of which were tailored to different audiences and as Davidson writes, all “perform[ing] different kinds of cultural work”. Cheaper tabloid editions reached the lower classes and educational children's editions used Charlotte's tragic story of seduction, abandonment, and eventual death as a parable of caution. Rowson's sequel Lucy Temple was released posthumously in 1828, but an illegitimate sequel by J. Barnitz Bacon, titled The History of Lucy Temple, released in 1877 truly indicates the cultural phenomenon that was Charlotte Temple. Davidson proclaims that the consensus in the 19th century was that “Charlotte Temple had managed to displace the Bible from the bedtables of America”. The cultural impact of Rowson's novel materialised as a grave was built for Charlotte in Trinity Churchyard, New York City. A 1900 New York Daily Tribune entry says it “has been the Mecca of sentimental visitors”, revealing the grave received frequent visitors, a “rate of about fifty a day”, even a century after the publishing of the novel.

== Sources ==
Charlotte's seducer and Lucy's father, John Montraville, was apparently based in part on John Montresor, a first-cousin of the author, though there are also reflections of a then-current story about General John Burgoyne.
