= Francis Wharton =

American legal scholar and teacher (1820–1889)

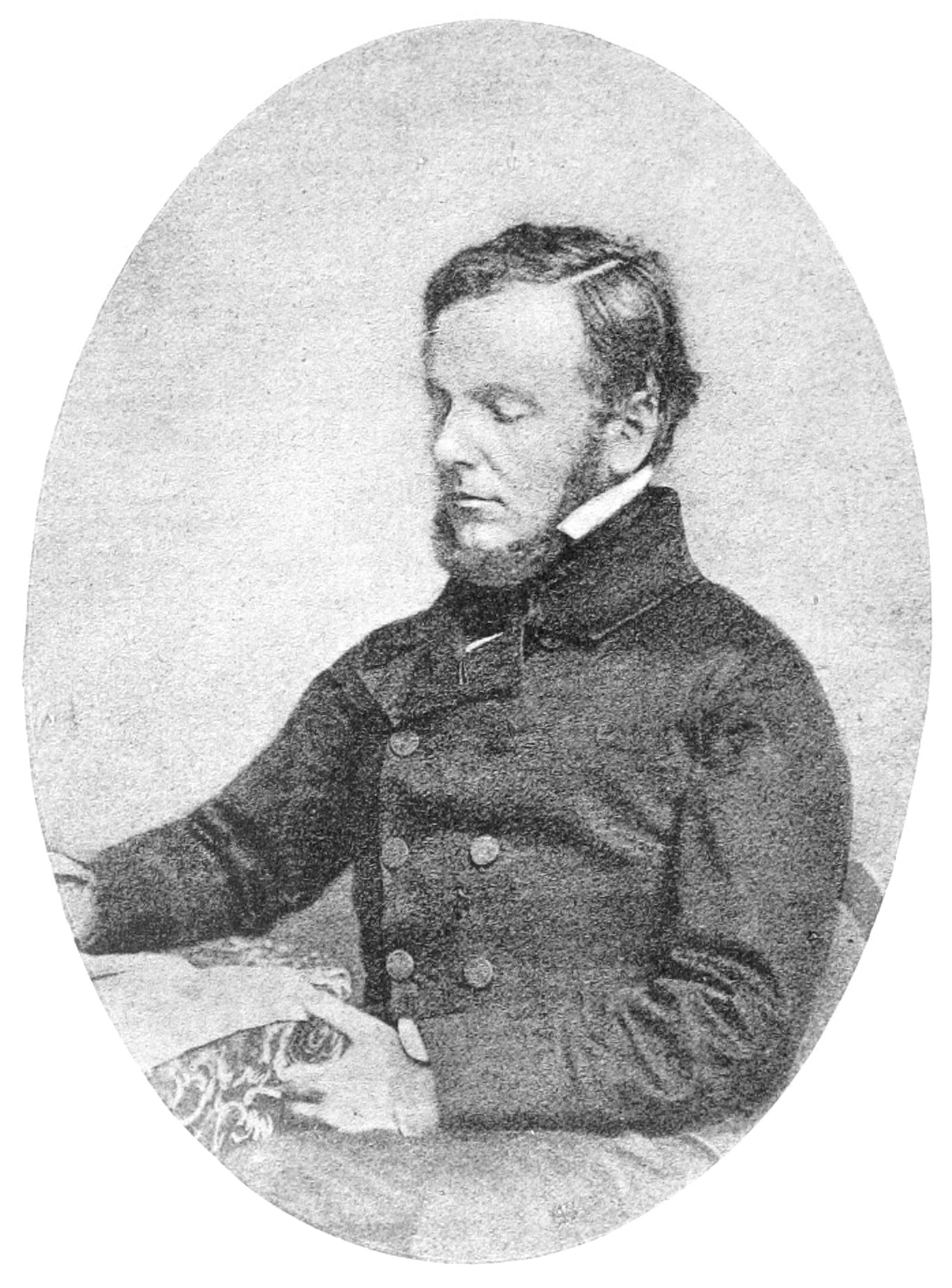
Francis Wharton, 1854

Francis Wharton (March 7, 1820 – February 21, 1889) was an American legal scholar, theologian, and educator.

== Life ==
Wharton was descended from an accomplished Quaker family in Philadelphia, Pennsylvania, although his father had become an Episcopalian in 1812. Born in 1820, Wharton graduated from Yale in 1839, read law in his father's office, and was admitted to the bar in 1843. He became prominent in Pennsylvania politics as a Democrat. He served as assistant attorney-general in 1845. In Philadelphia, he edited the North American and United States Gazette. From 1856 to 1863, he was a professor of English, History, and Literature at Kenyon College in Gambier, Ohio.

Wharton married Sidney Paul in 1852. After her death, he remarried in 1860 to Helen Elizabeth Ashhurst, with whom he had two daughters. Wharton took orders in the Protestant Episcopal Church in 1862, and was the rector of St. Paul's Church, Brookline, Massachusetts from 1863 to 1869. Wharton was a "broad churchman" and was deeply interested in the hymnology of the Episcopal church. Wharton was also interested in Christian apologetics, and he wrote an essay on the relationship between apologetics and jurisprudence that was published in The Princeton Review in 1878. From 1871 to 1881, he taught ecclesiastical polity and canon law in the Protestant Episcopal Theological School at Cambridge, Massachusetts, and during this time he lectured on the conflict of laws at Boston University.

For two years thereafter Wharton traveled in Europe. He received the degree of LL.D. from the University of Edinburgh in 1883. After two years in Philadelphia Wharton moved to Washington, DC, where he was lecturer on criminal law (1885–1886) and then professor of criminal law (1886–1888) at Columbian (now George Washington) University. He authored the doctrine in criminal law (Wharton's Rule of Concert of Action) that to form a conspiracy takes one more person than is necessary to commit the crime. (For example, it takes two people to gamble. Therefore, two people gambling cannot be guilty of conspiracy to gamble, though three can.)

From 1885 to 1888, Wharton was solicitor (or examiner of claims) of the Department of State. During the last two years of his life, Wharton amassed American Revolutionary War diplomatic correspondence and edited this material into a six volume work, published in 1889, the year of his death. This edition (authorized by Congress) of the Revolutionary Diplomatic Correspondence of the United States (6 vols, 1889, ed. by John Bassett Moore) superseded Jared Sparks's compilation.

In recognition of his accomplishments in international law, Wharton was elected to the Institute of International Law. Wharton's published views on U.S. citizenship, found in his treatises on Conflict of Laws (1881) and on the International Law of the United States (1887), are cited by the Solicitor General in the United States Government's 2026 Supreme Court brief in defense of President Trump's Executive Order attempting to limit the principle of birthright citizenship.

== Publications ==
- A Treatise on the Criminal Law of the United States (1846; many times revised)
- State Trials of the United States during the Administrations of Washington and Adams (1849)
- A Treatise on the Law of Homicide in the United States (1855)
- with Moreton Stillé, A Treatise on Medical Jurisprudence (1855)
- A Treatise on Theism and Modern Skeptical Theories (1859), in which he applied rules of legal evidence to modern skeptical theories
- A Treatise on the Conflict of Laws (1872; 3rd ed. 1905)
- A Treatise on the Law of Negligence (1874)
- A Commentary on the Law of Agency and Agents (1876)
- A Commentary on the Law of Evidence in Civil Issues (1877; 3rd ed. 1888)
- a companion work on Criminal Evidence
- "Recent Changes in Jurisprudence and Christian Apologetics," The Princeton Review, Vol. 2, no. 1 (July–December 1878) pp. 149–168. (This is accessible via http://www.hti.umich.edu/cgi/m/moajrnl).
- Commentary on the Law of Contracts (1882)
- Commentaries on Law (1884)
- Digest of the International Law of the United States (3 vols 1886; 2d ed. 1887).
- Wharton, Francis; Moore, John Bassett, eds. (1889). The revolutionary diplomatic correspondence of the United States. Vol. I. Washington : Government Printing Office.
- Wharton, Francis; Moore, John Bassett, eds. (1889). The revolutionary diplomatic correspondence of the United States. Vol. II. Washington : Government Printing Office Washington.
- Wharton, Francis; Moore, John Bassett, eds. (1889). The revolutionary diplomatic correspondence of the United States. Vol. III. Washington : Government Printing Office.
- Wharton, Francis; Moore, John Bassett, eds. (1889). The revolutionary diplomatic correspondence of the United States. Vol. IV. Washington : Government Printing Office.
- Wharton, Francis; Moore, John Bassett, eds. (1889). The revolutionary diplomatic correspondence of the United States. Vol. V. Washington : Government Printing Office.
- Wharton, Francis; Moore, John Bassett, eds. (1889). The revolutionary diplomatic correspondence of the United States. Vol. VI. Washington : Government Printing Office.
