= Susanna Rowson =

British-American novelist

Susanna Haswell Rowson
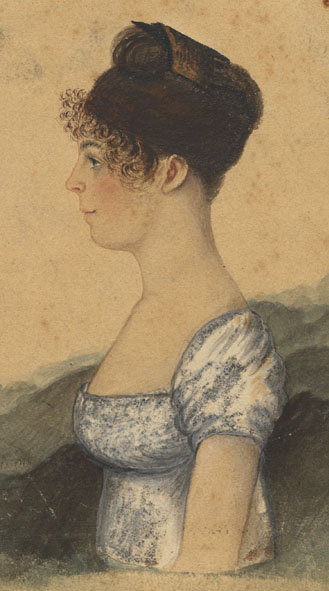
- Born: Susanna Haswell; 1762; Portsmouth, England
- Died: 2 March 1824 (aged 61–62); Boston, Massachusetts, United States
- Resting place: Graupner Family Vault, St. Matthew's Church, South Boston, Massachusetts, United States; Moved in 1866 to Mount Hope Cemetery, Boston
- Occupations: Novelist; poet; playwright; religious writer; governess; stage actress; educator
- Spouse: William Rowson
- Relatives: Robert Haswell (brother); James Gabriel Montresor (uncle); John Montresor (cousin); Anthony Haswell (cousin)
- Writing career
- Pen name: Susanna Rowson
- Notable work: Charlotte Temple

Susanna Rowson, née Haswell (1762 – 2 March 1824), was a British-American novelist, poet, playwright, religious writer, stage actress, and educator. She was the first woman geographer and an early supporter of female education. She also wrote against slavery. Rowson was the author of the 1791 novel Charlotte Temple, the most popular best-seller in American literature until Harriet Beecher Stowe's Uncle Tom's Cabin, was published serially in 1851–1852, and authored the first human geography textbook Rowson's Abridgement of Universal Geography in 1805.

== Biography ==
=== Childhood ===
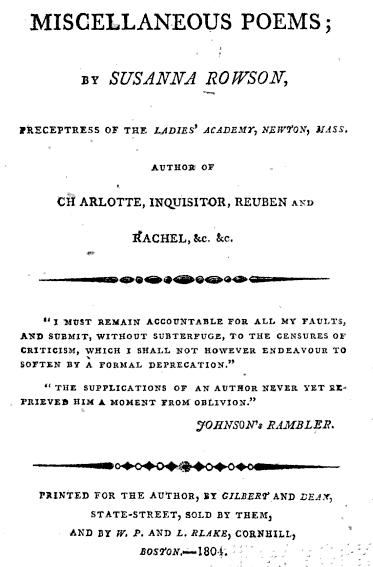
Rowson's poems, published in 1804 by Gilbert & Dean, Boston

Susanna Haswell was born in 1762 in Portsmouth, England to Royal Navy Lieutenant William Haswell and his first wife, Susanna Musgrave, who died within days of Susanna's birth. While stationed in Boston her father remarried to Rachel Woodward and started a second family, and after his ship returned to Portsmouth and was decommissioned, he obtained an appointment as a Boston customs officer, bringing his daughter and a servant with him to Massachusetts. On arrival in January 1767, their ship grounded on Lovells Island in Boston Harbor, the crew and passengers being rescued from the wreck days later. They lived at Nantasket (now Hull), where family friend James Otis took a special interest in Susanna's education. At the outbreak of the American Revolution, Lieutenant Haswell was placed under house arrest, and subsequently the family was moved inland, to Hingham and Abington, Massachusetts. In 1778, his failing health led to a prisoner exchange, and the family was sent via Halifax, Nova Scotia to England, eventually settling near Kingston upon Hull. Their American property was confiscated and they lived in relative poverty, being forced to sell the Portsmouth property left Susanna by her grandfather in order to support the family.

=== Pen and stage ===
It was as a governess living in Westminster that she wrote her first work, Victoria, dedicated to the Duchess of Devonshire and published in 1786. On 17 October of the same year, she married William Rowson, a hardware merchant who came from a theatrical family as well as reportedly being a Royal Horse Guards trumpeter. In 1791 in London, as 'Mrs. Rowson', she published the novel for which she is best known, Charlotte: A Tale of Truth, later reissued in America as Charlotte Temple, where it became the new nation's first best-selling novel. This popular story of seduction and remorse has gone through more than 200 editions. The novel sparked much controversy, both over its content and whether it could actually be considered a novel due to its minimal number of pages.

After William's hardware business failed and his father died in 1791, Susanna and William took in his orphaned sister Charlotte Rowson and they all turned to acting, William appearing as a member of the company of the Theatre Royal, Covent Garden, while Susanna joined the Theatre Royal, Edinburgh. In 1793, the three Rowsons were recruited for the Philadelphia theatre company of Thomas Wignell, also performing with them in Baltimore.

Over the next three years in Philadelphia, she wrote a novel, an opera, a musical farce about the Whiskey Rebellion (The Volunteers), a poetical address to the American troops, and several songs for the company in addition to performing 57 roles on the stage in two seasons. Rowson's work as a playwright and actor encouraged the growth of performing art in the United States. In response to her seemingly new-found republicanism and the liberal gender roles in her work, Slaves in Algiers, she was attacked by William Cobbett, who referred to her as "our American Sappho" (she returned fire, calling him a "loathsome reptile" in her introduction to Trials of the Human Heart).

=== Later years ===
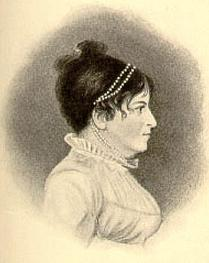
Susanna Rowson later in life

In 1796, Susanna reestablished contact with her old Edinburgh director, John Brown Williamson. He had taken over the Federal Street Theatre in Boston, and the Rowson trio relocated there in part to be closer to the more familiar residence of her youth and her core American literary fan base. The bankruptcy and major restructuring of the Boston theatre in 1797 would have sent Susanna and William to Charleston, but rather than head south they abandoned the stage after a few summer performances in Newport and Providence, Rhode Island. William clerked for a Boston merchant who went bankrupt, and having co-signed bonds, he was briefly imprisoned for his employer's debt. He was then hired at the Boston Custom House and there was employed for almost four decades. On leaving the stage, Susanna opened the first "female academy" in Boston in 1797 "Mrs Rowson's Academy for Young Ladies. The earliest American map samplers (1779,1780) were by students Lydia Withington and Sally Dodge who were educated there and cover detailed images of Boston harbour and islands and detailed street plan. Desiring a more rural setting, Rowson would move her school to Medford, then to Newton, Massachusetts, before returning it to Boston in 1809. She was a leader on female education and also the first woman geographer, publishing the first American education book on geography Rowson's Abridgement of Universal Geography in 1805, a textbook focussing on human geography not maps and including information on the position of women, the cultural, religious, financial and social structure of different continents and in particular the impact of the 'barbarous, degrading traffic' of slavery. She also published Youth's First Steps in Geography in 1811. She managed her school until 1822 and trained hundreds of girls overall.

Rowson also continued her writings, producing several novels, an additional work for the stage, a dictionary as well as the two geographies and as a contributor to the Boston Weekly Magazine (1802–1805). Her educational and literary work helped provide support for a growing household. Having no children of their own, they took in her husband's illegitimate son William, two adopted daughters, Frances Maria Mills, the orphaned daughter of an actor, and Susanna Rowson Johnston, her niece, who was daughter of Charlotte Rowson, and sister of artist David Claypoole Johnston, plus she hosted the widow and daughters of her half-brother, Robert Haswell, who had been lost at sea in 1801. (One of these nieces, Rebecca Haswell, who would marry Roxbury mayor John Jones Clarke, becoming great-grandmother of poet E. E. Cummings.) Susanna also headed a charity for widows and the fatherless. She retired from her school in 1822, passing its operation to her adopted daughters, and she died in Boston two years later, 2 March 1824. She was buried in the family vault of friend Gottlieb Graupner at St. Matthew's Church, South Boston. When this church was demolished in 1866, the indistinguishable remains in the vault were all moved together to the Mount Hope Cemetery. A cenotaph was later erected for Susanna Haswell Rowson and her brothers Robert and John Montresor Haswell at Forest Hills Cemetery in Boston's Jamaica Plain neighborhood, where she is memorialized as the author of Charlotte Temple.

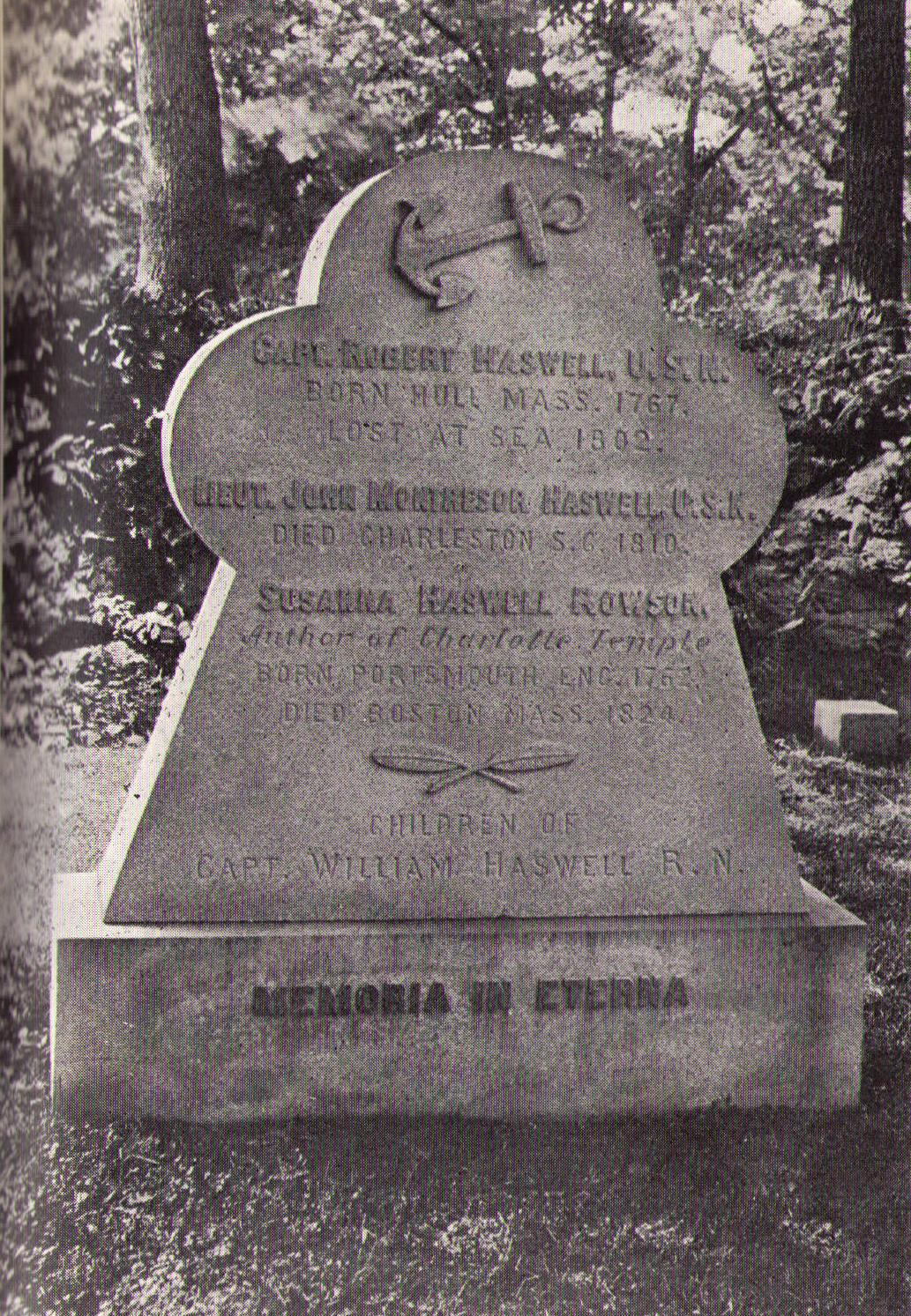
Rowson/Haswell memorial, Forest Hills Cemetery

== Works ==
=== Fiction ===
- Victoria (1786)
- The Inquisitor (1788)
- Mary, or, The Test of Honour (1789)
- Charlotte: a Tale of Truth (1791; retitled Charlotte Temple after the 3rd American edition, 1797)
- Mentoria; or, the Young Lady's Friend (1791)
- Rebecca, or, The Fille de Chambre (1792)
- Trials of the Human Heart (1795)
- Reuben and Rachel; or, Tales of Old Times (1799)
- Sarah (1813)
- Charlotte's Daughter, or, The Three Orphans (a sequel to Charlotte Temple published posthumously in 1828, with a memoir by Samuel L. Knapp; also known as Lucy Temple)

=== Plays ===
- Slaves in Algiers; or, A Struggle for Freedom (1794)
- The Female Patriot (1795)
- The Volunteers (1795)
- Americans in England (1796; retitled Columbian Daughters for 1800 production)
- The American Tar (1796)
- Hearts of Oak (1811)

=== Verse ===
- Poems on Various Subjects (1788)
- A Trip to Parnassus (1788)
- The Standard of Liberty (1795)
- Miscellaneous Poems (1811)

=== Other ===
- An Abridgement of Universal Geography (1805)
- A Spelling Dictionary (1807)
- A Present for Young Ladies (1811)
- Youth's first Step in Geography (1811)
- Biblical Dialogues Between a Father and His Family (1822)
- Exercises in History, Chronology, and Biography, in Question and Answer (1822)
