= Fanny Fern =

American novelist and children's writer (1811–1872)

Sara Willis
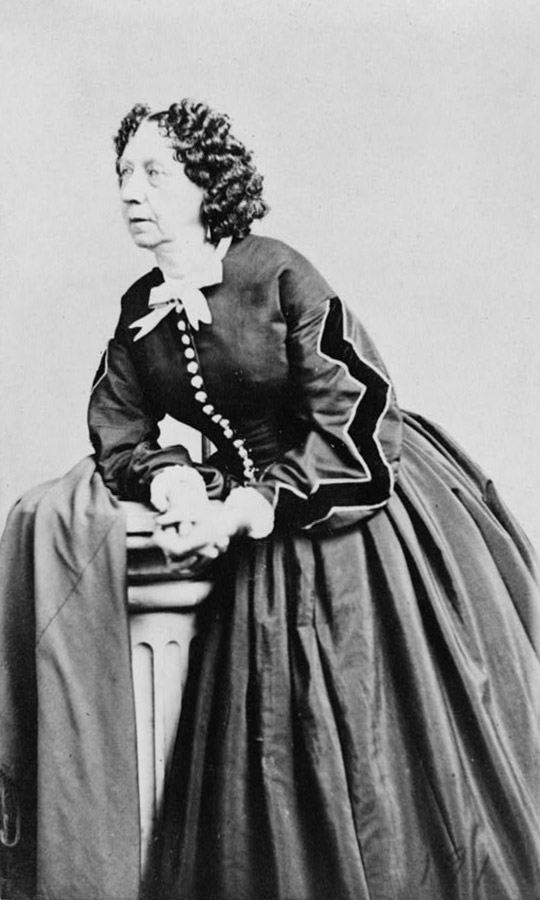
- Fern c. 1866
- Born: Sara Payson Willis; July 9, 1811; Portland, District of Maine, United States
- Died: October 10, 1872 (aged 61); New York City, New York, United States
- Resting place: Mount Auburn Cemetery, Massachusetts, United States
- Spouses: Charles Eldredge (m. 1837; died 1845) Samuel Farrington (m. 1849; div. 1853) James Parton (m. 1856)
- Children: 3 daughters
- Relatives: Nathaniel Willis (father); Hannah Parker (mother)

Fanny Fern (born Sara Payson Willis; July 9, 1811 – October 10, 1872), was an American novelist, children's writer, humorist, and newspaper columnist in the 1850s to 1870s. Her popularity has been attributed to a conversational style and sense of what mattered to her mostly middle-class female readers.

By 1855, Fern was the highest-paid US columnist, commanding $100 per week for her New York Ledger column. A collection of her columns published in 1853 sold 70,000 copies in its first year. Her best-known work, the fictional autobiography Ruth Hall (1854), has become a popular subject among feminist literary scholars.

== Biography ==
=== Early life ===
Sara Payson Willis was born in Portland, Maine, to newspaper owner Nathaniel Willis and his wife Hannah Parker. She was the fifth of their nine children. Her older brother Nathaniel Parker Willis became a notable journalist and magazine owner. Her younger brother Richard Storrs Willis became a musician and music journalist, known for writing the melody for "It Came Upon the Midnight Clear". Her other siblings were Lucy Douglas (born 1804), Louisa Harris (1807), Julia Dean (1809), Mary Perry (1813), Edward Payson (1816), and Ellen Holmes Willis (1821).

Her father intended to name his fifth child after a reverend named Edward Payson, who served as minister of Portland's Second Congregational Church. When the child was born a girl, he considered instead naming her after Payson's mother, Grata Payson. The reverend urged the Willises to reconsider, noting that his mother had never liked the name. In accordance with this request, the family named her Sara instead.

Willis's surname was to change often in her life, throughout three marriages and the adoption of her chosen pen name "Fanny Fern." She decided on the pen name because it reminded her of childhood memories of her mother picking ferns. Feeling that this chosen name was a better fit, she used it also in her personal life; eventually most of her friends and family called her "Fanny."

Willis attended Catharine Beecher's boarding school in Hartford, Connecticut. Beecher later described her as one of her "worst-behaved girls" (adding that she also "loved her the best.") Here, the girl had her first taste of literary success when her compositions were published in the local newspaper. She also attended the Saugus Female Seminary. After returning home, Willis wrote and edited articles for her father's Christian newspapers, The Puritan Recorder and The Youth's Companion.

=== First marriage and early career ===
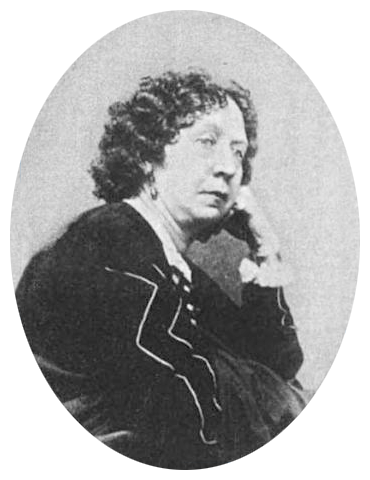
Fanny Fern in 1866. She was, "A large, argumentative brunette with a florid complexion, an aquiline nose, and sharp blue eyes...She made up in self-assurance for what she lacked in beauty."

In 1837, Willis married Charles Harrington Eldredge, a banker. They had three daughters together: Mary Stace (1838), Grace Harrington (1841), and Ellen Willis (1844). Sara's mother and younger sister Ellen both died early in 1844; in 1845, her eldest daughter Mary died of brain fever (meningitis); soon afterward, her husband Charles died from typhoid fever.

The widowed Willis was left nearly destitute. With little help from either her father or her in-laws – and none from her brother N.P. Willis – she struggled to make ends meet for her surviving young daughters. Her father persuaded her to remarry.

=== Second marriage ===
In January 1849, the young widow married Samuel P. Farrington, a merchant. The marriage was a mistake. Farrington was so intensely jealous that in 1851 Willis left him, scandalizing her family. The couple divorced two years later.

Willis published her first article, "The Governess", in November 1851 in the new Boston newspaper Olive Branch, followed by some short satirical pieces there and in True Flag. Soon after she regularly began using the pen name "Fanny Fern" for all her articles. In 1852, on her own with two daughters to support, she began writing in earnest. She sent samples of her work in her own name to her brother Nathaniel, by then a magazine owner, but he refused them and said her writing was not marketable outside Boston. He was proven wrong, as newspapers and periodicals in New York and elsewhere began printing Fanny Fern's "witty and irreverent columns".

In the summer of 1852, Fern was hired by publisher Oliver Dyer at twice her salary to publish a regular column exclusively in his New York newspaper Musical World and Times; she was the first woman to have a regular column. The next year, Dyer helped her find a publisher for her first two books: Fern Leaves from Fanny's Portfolio (1853), a selection of her more sentimental columns, and Little Ferns for Fanny's Little Friends (1853), a children's book. She had to reveal her legal name to the publishers. As it was still Farrington and disagreeable to her because of her divorce, she tried to keep her name secret. The former book sold 70,000 copies in its first year, "a phenomenal figure for the time."

=== Highest-paid columnist ===
James Parton, a biographer and historian who edited Home Journal, the magazine owned by Fern's brother Nathaniel (known as N.P. Willis), was impressed by Fern's work. He published her columns and invited the author to New York City. When her brother discovered this, he forbade Parton from publishing any more of Fern's work. Instead Parton resigned as editor of the magazine in protest.

Fern's first book, Fern Leaves (1853), was a best seller. It sold 46,000 copies in the first four months, and over 70,000 copies the first year. She received ten cents a copy in royalties, enough for her to buy a house in Brooklyn and live comfortably. Three years into her career, in 1855 she was earning $100 a week for her column in the New York Ledger, making her the highest-paid columnist in the United States. Her first regular column appeared on January 5, 1856, and would run weekly, without exception, until October 12, 1872, when the last edition was printed two days after her death.

Fern wrote two novels. Her first, Ruth Hall (1854), was based on her life – the years of happiness with Eldredge, the poverty she endured after he died and lack of help from male relatives, and her struggle to achieve financial independence as a journalist. Most of the characters are thinly veiled versions of people in her world. She took revenge by her unflattering portrayals of several who had treated her uncharitably when she most needed help, including her father, her brother N.P. Willis, her in-laws, and two newspaper editors. When Fern's identity was revealed shortly after the novel's publication, some critics believed it scandalous that she had attacked her own relatives; they decried her lack of filial piety and her want of "womanly gentleness" in such characterizations. At the same time, the book also garnered positive attention. The author Nathaniel Hawthorne, who had earlier complained about the "damned mob of scribbling women", wrote to his publisher in early 1855 in praise of the novel. He said he "enjoyed it a great deal. The woman writes as if the devil was in her, and that is the only condition in which a woman ever writes anything worth reading."

Wounded by the criticism and ambivalent about the wide publicity she stirred up, Fern tried to reduce the autobiographical elements in her second novel, Rose Clark. But while it features a conventionally sweet and gentle heroine, a secondary character makes a poor marriage of convenience, an act which Fern had regretted in her own life.

Fern's writing continued to attract attention. In her Ledger column of May 10, 1856, she defended the poet Walt Whitman in a favorable review of his controversial book Leaves of Grass. She noted Whitman's fearless individualism and self-reliance, as well as his honest and "undraped" portrayal of sex and the human body. Criticized for her admiration, she continued to champion literature that was ahead of its time. It has been suggested that Whitman imitated her Fern Leaves in his choice of cover art for the first edition.

=== Third marriage ===
Sara Willis and James Parton were married in 1856 when she was 45 and well established. She and her husband lived in New York City with Ellen, one of her two surviving daughters. They also raised Ethel, her granddaughter and orphan of Grace, who died in 1862.

In 1859, Fern bought a brownstone in Manhattan at what is now 303 East Eighteenth Street near Second Avenue. She and Parton lived in the house for 13 years until her death.

=== Final years ===
Fanny Fern's grave

Fern continued as a regular columnist for the Ledger for the remainder of her life. She was a suffrage supporter, and in 1868 she co-founded Sorosis, New York City's pioneer club for women writers and artists. The club was formed by Fern and others after women were excluded from hearing the author Charles Dickens at the all-male New York Press Club dinner in his honor.

Fern dealt with cancer for six years and died on October 10, 1872. She is buried in Mount Auburn Cemetery in Cambridge, Massachusetts next to her first husband. Her gravestone was inscribed simply "Fanny Fern". After her death, her widower James Parton published Fanny Fern: A Memorial Volume (1874).

== Published works ==
Overall, Fanny Fern produced two novels, a novella, six collections of columns, and three books for children.

Column collections

- Fern Leaves from Fanny's Portfolio (1853)
- Fern Leaves, second series (1854)
- Fresh Leaves (1857)
- Folly As It Flies (1868)
- Ginger-Snaps (1870)
- Caper-Sauce (1872)

Novels

- Ruth Hall (1854)
- Fanny Ford (1855), serialized in the Ledger, beginning June 9, 1855.
- Rose Clark (1856)

Children's books

- Little Ferns for Fanny's Little Friends (1853)
- The Play-Day Book (1857)
- The New Story Book for Children (1864)

== Literary criticism ==
Fern developed a writing style that closely reflected her pugnacious personality, with its common-sensical optimistic approach, always leavened with a dash of humor. She was an individualist who sought answers to social problems through individual personality development rather than politicized organizational movements. She did tackle such major issues as prostitution, divorce, child labor, and the horrors of slum living. Instead of calling for the radical reconstruction of society, she told her large audience of middle-class women to improve their health and their minds, urging downtrodden wives to be patient and bore from within.

Fern was extremely successful in her lifetime as a columnist. She was said to fit her material and subject matter to the audience. Many readers of weekly literary papers were women, and Fern addressed them in a conversational style, often using interjections and exclamation points, while tackling topics that concerned the daily life of ordinary women. Her readers were wives and mothers who worried about their children, current fashions, difficult husbands, and aggravating relatives. Sometimes they felt oppressed, depressed, or stressed. Fern expressed their problems in plain language, addressing women's suffrage, the woman's right to her children in a divorce, unfaithful husbands, social customs that restricted women's freedom, and sometimes just having a bad day.

Critics of "women's literature" considered some of these strengths to be weaknesses. They attacked her conversational style as unprofessional, feminine, and too spontaneous. Many male critics labeled her as "sentimental". This has led to counter-criticism about what exactly "sentimental" writing is, and why it is considered bad. The criticism showed women's lower status in society almost as well as Fern did in her work. Nathaniel Hawthorne praised her as an exception to the "damned mob of scribbling women", who wrote "as if the devil was in her". Fern was straightforward when she wrote of subjects such as men's economic and social victimization of women.

== Legacy ==
- Fanny Fern is credited with coining the phrase, "The way to a man's heart is through his stomach".
- Henry D. Butler dedicated his 1858 book The Family Aquarium to "the gifted litterateuse whose nom de plume is 'Fanny Fern'"
- Fern's granddaughter Ethel Grace Thomson Parton became a correspondent for the periodical The Youth's Companion (founded by her great-uncle, Nathaniel Willis).
- In 2005, Susan Stoderl's opera about Fern, titled A.F.R.A.I.D. (American Females for Righteousness Abasement Ignorance & Docillity), premiered as the inaugural show of the Brooklyn Repertory Opera, at the New York International Fringe Festival.
