= Nathaniel Willis =

Nathaniel Willis may refer to:

- Nathaniel Willis (1755–1831), American newspaperman in Boston, Virginia and Ohio
- Nathaniel Willis (1780–1870), American editor and publisher in Boston and Maine
- Nathaniel Parker Willis (1806–1867), American author, poet and editor
