= James Parton =

American biographer (1822–1891)

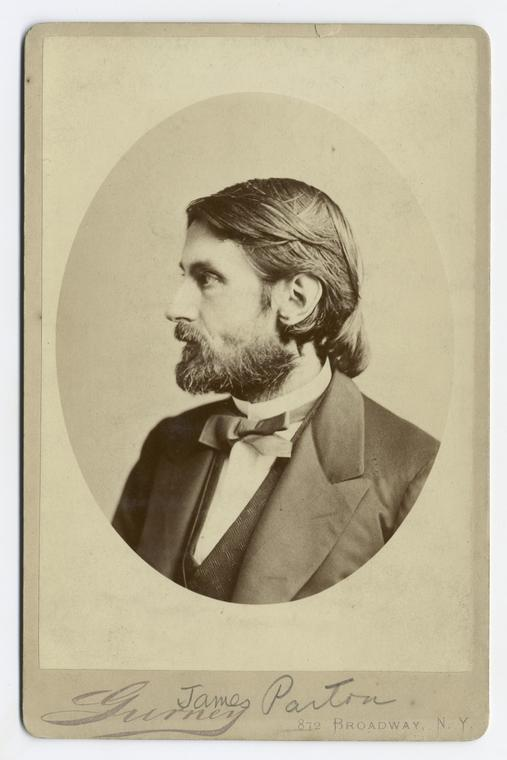
- Parton c. 1870
- Born: February 9, 1822; Canterbury, England
- Died: October 17, 1891 (aged 69); Newburyport, Massachusetts, U.S.
- Occupation: Writer
- Spouses: Fanny Fern (m. 1856; died 1872); Ellen Willis Eldredge (m. 1876)
- Writing career
- Subject: Biography

James Parton (February 9, 1822 – October 17, 1891) was an English-born American biographer who wrote books on the lives of Horace Greeley, Aaron Burr, Andrew Jackson, Benjamin Franklin, Thomas Jefferson, Voltaire, and contributed three biographies to Eminent Women of the Age.

== Biography ==
Parton was born in Canterbury, England, in 1822. He was taken to the United States when he was five years old, studied in New York City and White Plains, New York, and was a schoolmaster in Philadelphia and then in New York. He moved to Newburyport, Massachusetts, where he died on October 17, 1891.

Parton was the most popular biographer of his day in America. Parton's nonfiction combined elements of novel writing, which made his books quite popular. Harriet Beecher Stowe once thanked him "for the pleasure you have given me in biographical works which you have had the faculty of making more interesting than romance—(let me trust it is not by making them in part works of imagination)."

His first wife, Sara (1811–1872), sister of Nathaniel Parker Willis, and widow of Charles H. Eldredge (d. 1846), attained considerable popularity as a writer under the pen name Fanny Fern. They were married in 1856. Her works include the novels, Ruth Hall (1854), reminiscent of her own life, and Rose Clark (1857); and several volumes of sketches and stories.

In 1876 Parton married Ellen Willis Eldredge, his first wife's daughter by her first husband, Charles Eldredge. With Ellen (and previously Fanny Fern), he raised Ethel, the daughter of Grace Eldredge (Fanny Fern's daughter) and writer Mortimer Thomson (also known as Philander Doesticks). Although never legally adopted by Parton, she took his last name upon reaching her majority. Ethel Parton became a famous writer of children's books about 19th-century life in Newburyport, MA, published in the 1930s and 1940s.

James and Ellen had two children, Hugo and Mabel. Hugo's children, who constitute James Parton's legal and genetic grandchildren, were

- James Parton (1912–2001), founder and publisher of the magazines American Heritage and Horizon
- Nike Parton (1922–2005), a prominent Florida artist.

== Selected works ==
- Life of Horace Greeley (1855)
- Life and Times of Aaron Burr (1857)
- Life of Andrew Jackson (1859–1860) 3 volumes
- General Butler in New Orleans: History of the Administration of the Department of the Gulf in the Year 1862: With an Account of the Capture of New Orleans, and a Sketch of the Previous Career of the General, Civil and Military (1864)
- Life and Times of Benjamin Franklin (1864)
- Famous Americans of Recent Times (1867)
- Eminent Women of the Age; Being Narratives of the Lives and Deeds of the Most Prominent Women of the Present Generation (1868) (Forty-seven biographies of women, of which Parton wrote four: Florence Nightingale, Mrs. Frances Anne Kemble, Jenny Lind Goldschmidt, and Victoria, Queen of England.)
- The People's Book of Biography (1868)
- Life of Thomas Jefferson (1874)
- Life of Voltaire (1881)
- Noted Women of Europe and America: Authors, Artists, Reformers, and Heroines. Queens, Princesses, and Women of Society. Women Eccentric and Peculiar. From the Most Recent and Authentic Sources (1883)
- Captains of Industry (two series, 1884 and 1891)
