= Ruth Hall (novel) =

1854 novel by Fanny Fern

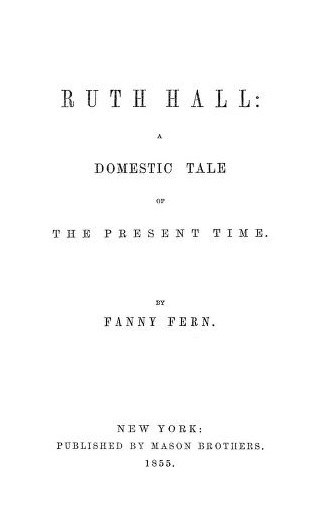
- Author: Fanny Fern
- Language: English
- Genre: Roman à clef
- Publisher: Mason Brothers
- Publication date: November 1854
- Publication place: United States
- Media type: Print (Hardcover)
- Pages: 400 (approx. 220 in recent editions)

Ruth Hall: A Domestic Tale of the Present Time is a roman à clef by Fanny Fern (pen name of Sara Payson Willis), a popular 19th-century newspaper writer. Following on her meteoric rise to fame as a columnist, she signed a contract in February 1854 to write a full-length novel. She finished Ruth Hall within a few months, and it was first published in November 1854.

== Plot summary ==
The autobiographical novel can be divided into three phases: Ruth's happy marriage, impoverished widowhood, and rise to fame and financial independence as a newspaper columnist.

=== Marriage ===
In the first chapter, young Ruth Ellet sits at her window on the night before her wedding, reflecting on her life so far. When her mother died long ago, she was sent away to boarding school, where she excelled at writing compositions. There is no love lost between Ruth and her father, who has plenty of money but begrudges her every penny; and although she adores her talented older brother, Hyacinth. He is a strange, cold-hearted man who slights his sister for her overtures of affection. Ruth, therefore, pins all her hopes on her impending marriage to Harry Hall.

She duly marries Harry. He is a good, loving man, and handsome and prosperous, too. At this stage, the only thorn in Ruth's side is Harry's parents: old Mrs. Hall is so bitterly jealous of her son's pretty new wife that she finds fault with her constantly, and both in-laws meddle continually in Ruth's life. When Harry and Ruth move to a farm five miles away, they follow him.

Harry and Ruth's first child, Daisy, brings them great joy. In the grandparents' eyes, however, the little girl is "out of control", and they consider Ruth a terrible mother. Ruth and Daisy play in the creek, and pick wild flowers together, which the grandmother hates. Daisy becomes ill in the winter and dies of croup because Dr. Hall, Ruth's father-in-law refuses to take Ruth's call for help seriously and fails to attend to the child immediately. Ruth and Harry have two more daughters, Katy and Nettie; then, while Nettie is still an infant, Harry contracts typhoid fever and dies.

=== Widowhood ===
Ruth, left with very little money, applies to her relatives for help. The elder Halls and Ruth's father grudgingly provide her with a tiny income. She moves into a boarding house in a slum district, just up the road from a brothel, and searches unsuccessfully for employment as a schoolteacher or a seamstress. Her rich friends drop her, her relatives snub her, and only rarely does anyone offer help or encouragement. When Katy falls ill, Mrs. Hall persuades her to give up Katy to them and then treats the little girl harshly. Meanwhile, Ruth's funds continue to diminish, forcing her to move into a barren garret and live on bread and milk.

Ruth, nearly desperate, hits on the idea of writing for the newspapers. She composes several samples and sends them to her brother Hyacinth, who is an influential publisher. He sends the samples back, along with an insolent note telling her she has no talent.

=== Success ===
Ruth perseveres, adopting the pen name 'Floy', and finally finds an editor, Mr. Lascom, who is willing to purchase her writings. Her columns are a hit; soon, she is publishing several pieces a week for Mr. Lascom and for another editor, Mr. Tibbetts. Subscription lists burgeon and fan mail comes pouring in, but Ruth is still barely getting by because neither editor will give her more money for her contributions. Accordingly, when a publisher named Mr. Walter offers her twice her present rate of pay to work exclusively for his magazine, she accepts.

Mr. Walter becomes her best friend and advocate. Since she now has to write only one piece per week, Ruth has time to compile a book-length selection of her columns. This becomes a best-seller, making Ruth not only independent, but wealthy. She ransoms Katy and moves into a comfortable hotel with both her daughters. In the last scene, she visits her husband's grave and looks sadly at the space reserved for her at his side, then leaves the cemetery, thinking of the good things life might still have in store.

== Ruth Hall characters and their historical antecedents ==
- Ruth Hall is a fictionalized version of Sarah Payson Willis, better known as Fanny Fern. One of Ruth's poignant characteristics was her quest for love which may have been caused by an almost non-existent brother and father. From a young age Ruth wished that she were beautiful not so that she would be admired, but rather that she would be loved. Often termed as “awkward” and “very plain” by her older brother Hyacinth, Ruth worked hard to win his favor. As she grew older and became fonder of being alone with herself, Ruth began to be called “odd” and “queer.” After being sent to boarding school upon her mother's death, it started to become apparent that Ruth was very different from her peers. While many of the girls around her stole away in the night to meet their beaux, “unsophisticated Ruth” would often spend her time educating herself in matters of history, astronomy, languages, and mathematics. Ruth would continue to be held in contempt even after her marriage to Harry Hall by those around her. Unversed in manners of housekeeping and cooking as she had spent most of her life in boarding school, Ruth was seen as frivolous and impractical by her mother-in-law. Because she spent most of her time picking flowers and spending time with nature, Mrs. Hall viewed Ruth as nothing but a “well dressed doll.” Ruth would continue to be seen as without value for a large portion of her life after her husband's death. Only after she met Mr. Walter would Ruth begin to realize her own worth. Mr. Walter in essence would serve as Ruth's awakening. For the first time since her husband's death she would begin to understand that she was a valuable member of society with a great number of talents.
- Harry Hall is Ruth's husband. His character in the novel imitates Fern's first husband, Charles Harrington Eldredge in real life. He is extremely loving of Ruth Hall. This is often evident, beginning with the fact that he still marries her despite his parents' disapproval of his choice. He is committed and dedicated to providing a good life for his wife and children and works hard at a counting house as banker to do so. He soon catches typhoid fever and dies. His untimely death devastates and traumatizes his wife and family.
- Hyacinth Ellet is Fern's brother, Nathaniel Parker Willis, Hyacinth is Ruth's brother who from a young age disagreed with her. He is the wealthy and influential publisher of ‘The Irving Magazine.’ When Ruth writes to him asking for a job, he refuses despite her lack of income and living situation, telling her that she has no talent. When Ruth finally achieves success, he is exposed to society as the evil and heartless man that he is.
- Mr. Ellet is Ruth's wealthy father, who provides very little aid to her and his granddaughters when Ruth's husband passes away. He is Fern's father, Nathaniel Willis, a publisher of The Youth's Companion and other religious magazines.
- Daisy Hall is the oldest child of Ruth and Harry Hall and is very much like her mother in her love for nature. Her sudden death from a fever is the beginning of Ruth's series of tragedies.
- Katy Hall is Ruth's eldest living daughter. She is very shy and protective of her mother. When Ruth faces tough economic times, Katy's grandparents take Katy from her mother to live with them. Katy is not happy there and wants to return home. Compared to her sister, Katy is much quieter and timid. She is very close with her mother and sister and has a sincere hatred for her grandmother. Her one wish in the novel is for her small family to be able to live under the same roof comfortably.
- Nettie Hall is the youngest of Ruth Hall's three children and closely resembles her mother. Her character in the novel imitates Fanny Fern's real life daughter Ellen. Mr. Walter jokes, "Nettie, is Ruth second, in face, form and feature." Nettie is witty, playful, innocent, and opinionated. Her joking ways, use of puns and play on language further go to show her outgoing personality, which so much mimics her own mother.
- Dr. Hall is Ruth's father-in-law. He does not dislike Ruth to the same extent as his wife, but becomes persuaded and influenced to feel the same by his wife's actions and words. After the death of his son, Ruth comes to him in a time of desperation and he turns her away, leaving his daughter-in-law and his granddaughters destitute.
- Mrs. Hall is Ruth's mother-in-law. She is eternally unsupportive of Ruth and over-protective of Harry. She does not believe that Ruth is good enough for Harry and is constantly criticizing her abilities to fulfill household duties. Mrs. Hall is determined to keep Ruth down, even in Ruth's worst moments after the death of Harry.
- Mr. Tibbetts is Editor of The Pilgrim and Ruth's initial publisher, who refused to give her a proper salary because she was a woman, even though he overworks her. He is William Moulton, editor of the True Flag.
- Mr. Walters is the protagonist male character in the novel. He enters the story midway as a publisher interested in publishing Floy's works exclusively with his company. Mr. Walter does not want to disregard Ruth Hall as a woman, and is the only man in the novel that treats her with respect. He writes to her and signs off as her "brother", which Ruth comes to see him as. Unlike Hyacinth, her blood brother, Mr. Walter is able to support Ruth financially, make her concerns his own, and take interest in her children. He is a genuine character that offers hope to Ruth.

== Style ==
Ruth Hall was Fern's first novel; her previous writings were short newspaper editorials written in a brisk conversational style, usually under intense deadline pressure. This hasty, staccato style carries over into the novel, which is just over 200 pages long in contemporary editions but contains forty separate chapters averaging two to three pages each.

The earlier chapters describing Ruth's marriage unfold as a series of vignettes presenting the heroine's life from various viewpoints. Ruth's good qualities can be inferred mostly from her mother-in-law's efforts to blacken her character; in one scene, for example, old Mrs. Hall, desperate to find some fault with her hated rival, goes through Ruth's home room by room, conducting a spiteful internal monologue as she seeks avidly for the minutest error in housekeeping. At this point, the narrator breaks into the narrative to apostrophise about the ominous future closing in on youthful innocence.

Then Harry dies, leaving Ruth nearly penniless and saddled with two young children. Finding that her well-to-do relatives will give her only the most grudging pittance, Ruth sheds her illusions and resolves to make her own way in the world. This angry, defiant Ruth ceases to be the passive object of the narrator's pity and steps to the center of the action, a full-fledged protagonist.

According to Stephen Harnett, in his article “Fanny Fern’s 1855 Ruth Hall, the Cheerful Brutality of Capitalism and the Irony of Sentimental Rhetoric,” Ruth Hall was primarily written in sentimental prose. However, it is ironic because Fern structures her novel around the fundamental contradiction of the cheerful brutality of capitalism. Harnett brings in the capital aspect to his thesis when explaining the money Ruth has encountered by becoming a writer by emphasizing many conversations between Ruth and Mr. Walter. He notes that the ending of Ruth Hall in a sense does not fit and also complicates the sentimental novel because it ends with Ruth “social-climbing” which occurs in the world of capitalism. This can be viewed as an economic and political conclusion of victory for the capitalist culture of industry and stands in ironic contrast to the sentimental novel.

== Fern's relationship with the publishing world ==
Fanny Fern, and her fictional counterpart Ruth Hall are used in this novel as a case study to display a new capitalistic need for women's literary talents during the stage of high supply and demand throughout the 1850s. Fanny Fern became a “fiercely sought after commodity whose demand was so high” that it “caused a feeding frenzy amongst rivaling publishers." Her success was unprecedented, for she was among the first women to achieve such success in the literary world. Previously, publishers had trading rights over their writers, but with the emergence of Fern's writings, many overlooked this courtesy. Trade courtesy was an unwritten agreement that prevented mass rivalry “over the right to publish popular writer’s,” but the breaching of this courtesy in Fern's case worked in her favor, due to the maximum profits she received as a professional author. This end of trade courtesy reflects modern society's need for a familial relationship between publishers and their writers; it is not merely cold business, but instead warm relationships established over a long period. Ruth Hall's relationship with Walter in the novel reflects Fern's relationship with her publisher, and they exhibit these new, warm-hearted qualities. Through the publication of Fanny Fern's literature, she encourages publishers to end trade courtesy, and allow open bidding for greater success. With this newfound success, Fanny Fern uses her own professional authorship as an opportunity to challenge the 19th century view of the ideal woman, break free of typical, domestic spheres, and lead women towards independence.

== Reception and influence ==
Ruth Hall received mostly good reviews, and sold well. However, Fern's unflattering portraits of her family and her first two editors soon got her into difficulties. William Moulton, editor of the True Flag, recognised himself in the parsimonious Mr. Tibbetts and decided to retaliate. He put together a book called The life and beauties of Fanny Fern which consisted of his former star contributor's most satirical pieces, together with an essay that not only impugned her character, but revealed her true identity to the public. Fern was deeply wounded, and the novel became more controversial; critics began perceiving a want of filial piety in Fern's lampooning of her own family, in addition to a most unfeminine thirst for revenge. The scandal, however, did nothing to damp sales, which soon climbed to 70,000.

Despite his notorious comment about a "damned mob of scribbling women", Nathaniel Hawthorne admired the novel and in 1855 confided to his publisher:

In my last, I recollect, I bestowed some vituperation on female authors. I have since been reading "Ruth Hall"; and I must say I enjoyed it a good deal. The woman writes as if the Devil was in her; and that is the only condition under which a woman ever writes anything worth reading. Generally women write like emasculated men, and are only distinguished from male authors by a greater feebleness and folly; but when they throw off the restraints of decency, and come before the public stark naked, as it were—then their books are sure to possess character and value. Can you tell me anything about this Fanny Fern? If you meet her, I wish you would let her know how much I admire her. (Letters to Ticknor, 1:78)

Ruth Hall has since become Fern's most enduring work. The novel's depiction of a Victorian-era woman who earns financial independence has made it a favorite with contemporary feminist literary scholars. In most domestic novels of this period, the heroine's quest ends with a happy marriage and the surrendering of all employment outside the home. In this case, however, the happy marriage is only a prologue; it is also a mixed blessing, bringing with it the sorrow of a child's death, along with a truly awful set of in-laws who must always be placated and appeased.

When her husband dies, Ruth finds out how little her domestic virtues are worth in the marketplace. No-one offers Ruth much charity: newspaper editors treat her unfairly; men at her boarding house try to prey on her; her brother won't publish her columns; her father urges her to give up her children, Katy and Nettie, so he won't have to support them; and her in-laws take in Katy because Ruth can't afford to feed her, then treat her with more than Calvinist harshness. Here, the consummation of the heroine's struggle is neither marriage nor death, but the moment when Ruth, having earned a small fortune with her first book, reclaims Katy and at long last tells her mother-in-law what she really thinks of her.

== Critical theory ==
According to Joyce Warren in Stephen Hartnett's article, "The Cheerful Brutality of Capitalism," Fanny Fern's depiction of Ruth Hall's financial success helped 19th century women transcend gender restrictions, despite social norms. According to critic Jennifer Larson, Fanny Fern argues that when women follow the conventional path of domesticity and allow themselves to be subordinate to men, they allow themselves to be oppressed. However, when women liberate themselves by entering the market place, they are able to "renovate" their lives and succeed in and out of their homes and become their own individuals.

Linda Grasso argues that Ruth Hall is woman's public expression of anger and is used as a strategic political tool. She contends that God has given woman the ability to be intellectual and possess talent and so they should be allowed to utilize this ability through writing as Fanny Fern has. Jenniffer Harris suggests that Fanny Fern's Ruth Hall is not a typical novel which simply illustrates the story of a woman and her marriage, but rather an eventual widow who manages to gain economic independence without having to depend on a man or anyone else. Harris expresses how "women are not accorded the delicacy of treatment or respect that they should be in the male-dominated workplace." She feels that Ruth Hall revolutionizes this reality by becoming a prestigious writer, similar to the way Fanny Fern did in her own life.

According to Christine Ross' "Logic, Rhetoric, and Discourse in the Literary Texts of Nineteenth-Century Women", Ross tries to pick apart the logical discourses of women writers in the nineteenth century evaluating the grammatical cases of the female writer, female protagonist and the feminine awakening that took place in her novels. She tries to bring forth the exposure that was given at the time to these writers as they grew more popular with their literary works and awareness of their profitability/marketability of their gender differences, and how publishers of the time used this to their advantage. Ross points out that the character Ruth Hall experiences this first hand at the end of the novel, claiming that Fanny Fern tried to bring this aspect of exposure to light to her reading audiences. She also comments on Fanny Ferns satirical analysis of "men of taste" to show the true colors of men at the time, saying that Willis was the satire of the "unearned privileges of masculinity and social class".

In her article, "Renovating Domesticity in Ruth Hall", Incidents in the Life of a Slave Girl, and Our Nig, Jennifer Larson emphasizes the negative impacts that the domestic discourse had on women and through the novels, Ruth Hall, Incident Life of A Slave Girl and Our Nig, she is able to show how some women could overcome the oppression that they were left in after their husband's failure. After the death of her husband, Harry, Ruth is left destitute and dependent on the charity of her entourage; father, brother and most unfortunately her in laws. She undergoes much difficulty trying to face the world alone with her two children. After many rejections, Ruth is able to find a job as a writer, which gradually leads to her success and freedom. According to Larson, Ruth Hall, the protagonist, is a great example of how women can triumph over the oppression and liberate themselves by working. For Ruth, writing helped her to become successful and self reliable.

According to David Dowling's article "Capital Sentiment: Fanny Fern’s Transformation of the Gentleman Publisher’s Code," Fern capitalized on the changing market's conditions regarding work and gender. During the 1850s, male publishers and female authors began a new relationship and woman writers began to receive wages for their professional authorship. To form this relationship, male publishers broke the act of trade courtesy, which was a gentleman's agreement not to infringe upon the initial publisher's right to reprint work. Although trade courtesy worked out of respect, Ruth Hall encouraged publishers to overlook this act by bidding for authors like her to write for them. Fern defended the publishers going against trade courtesy within her writings because each new bid for her work increased her salary and her “value in the market.” In Ruth Hall, many of Ruth's domestic life scenes are infused with language associated with trade courtesy ethics. For example, Ruth responds to the possibility of her husband's illness as putting her own life at risk by saying, “’My husband was the first claim,’” meaning that her main loyalty is with him. Only after his death is Ruth able to act freely and ultimately work with her publisher Mr. Walter. Dowling also discusses how Fern used “‘sentimental imagery and language patterning’ as a way of disguising her main purpose of evolving Ruth into ‘self definition and verbal power.'" In Ruth Hall, Ruth spends barely one-third of the story in a domestic setting. Instead, Ruth establishes both a career and prepares herself to be a better wife in a marketplace initially dominated by men.

In Jennifer Harris’ article, Marketplace Transactions and Sentimental Currencies in Fanny Fern’s Ruth Hall, she elaborates on the ideology of women being distanced from the economic world and kept in the domestic scene. Fanny Fern addresses and refutes this ideology through her protagonist, Ruth Hall. Instead of improving her living conditions through a traditional, dependent remarriage, after the death of her husband and the abandonment of her in-laws and father, she exits domesticity and enters the patriarchal marketplace, negotiates her capital worth, and acquires independent value.

Gale Temple's article "A Purchase on Goodness: Fanny Fern, Ruth Hall and Fraught Individualism" discusses the novel's 'fraught individualism'. Fraught individualism is a term derived from C.B. Macpherson's concept of "possessive individualism." By definition this is the implicit sense that developed alongside liberal capitalism that individuals "own" themselves, they are entirely free to enter those selves into public society, and they do so with regard primarily for their own interest rather than the interest of the state or the broader civic realm. A characteristic of "possessive individualism" is that abstract social malefactors may try to limit or mute the individual's ability to truly flower. This characteristic is portrayed numerous times within Ruth Hall, first by Ruth's mother and then again when she tried to enter the work force. The article also discusses the continued assault on Ruth's individualism, mainly by her mother in law.
