= Nancy Amelia Woodbury Priest Wakefield =

American poet

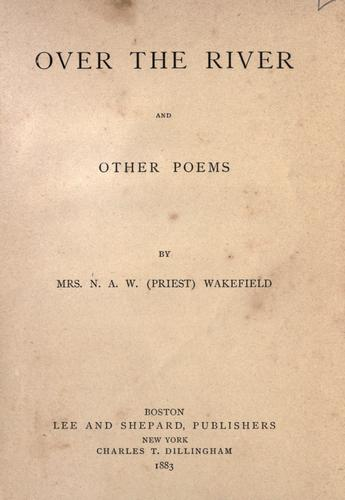
Over the River (1883), a collection of poetry by Nancy Amelia Woodbury Priest Wakefield

Nancy Amelia Woodbury Priest Wakefield (née Nancy Amelia Woodbury Priest; December 7, 1836 - September 21, 1870) was an American poet.

== Life ==
She was born at Royalston, Massachusetts, in 1836. She worked in a mill in New Hampshire for several years. Her fame rests upon the popular poem, "Over the River", published in the Springfield Republican in 1857. According to some accounts, she wrote the first draft of the poem while at work in the mill.

In 1865, she was married to Lieut. Arlington C. Wakefield. She died at Winchendon, Massachusetts, in 1870, leaving behind her husband and three children, one only an infant.

Her poems were published 13 years after her death by her mother, Mrs. Francis D. Priest, with a memoir by the Rev. Abijah Perkins Marvin (Boston, 1883).

== Selected works ==
- 1883, Over the River: And Other Poems
