= Boston Recorder =

The Boston Recorder was a Congregationalist newspaper established by Nathaniel Willis (Nathaniel Parker Willis's father) and Sidney E. Morse in 1816 in Boston, Massachusetts. It published weekly newspapers from 1817 to 1824. The paper primarily published religious news and accounts of missionary and other religious organizations, and it also published civic, agricultural, political news, and other topics. It also published Nathaniel Parker Willis's biblical poems. It merged with the Boston Telegraph to form the Boston Recorder and Telegraph.

== Editors and contributors ==
- Nancy H. Adsit, contributor
- Harriette Newell Woods Baker, contributor
- Abijah Perkins Marvin, associate editor
- Harvey Newcomb, contributor
- Calvin Ellis Stowe, editor
- Joseph Tracy, editor
- Nathaniel Parker Willis, contributor
