= Harvey Newcomb =

American writer

Harvey Newcomb (September 2, 1803 – August 30, 1863) was an American clergyman and writer.

He was born in Thetford, Vermont. He removed to western New York in 1818, engaged in teaching for eight years, and from 1826 till 1831 edited several journals, of which the last was the Christian Herald.

For the ten following years he was engaged in writing and preparing books for the American Sunday School Union. He was licensed to preach in 1840, took charge of a Congregational church in West Roxbury, Massachusetts, and subsequently held other pastorates.

He was an editor of the Boston Traveller in 1849, and in 1850-1 assistant editor of the New York Observer, also preaching in the Park Street mission church of Brooklyn, New York, and in 1859 he became pastor of a church in Hancock, Pennsylvania. He contributed regularly to the Boston Recorder and to the Youth's Companion, and also to religious journals. He wrote 178 volumes, of which fourteen are on church history, the others being chiefly books for children, including Young Lady's Guide (New York, 1839); How to be a Man (Boston, 1846); How to be a Lady (1846); and Cyclopedia of Missions (1854; 4th ed., 1856). He also was the author of Manners and Customs of the North American Indians (2 vols., Pittsburgh, 1835).

He died in Brooklyn.
