= Harriette Woods Baker =

American author (1815–1893)

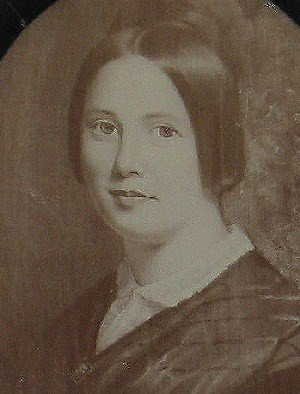
- Born: Harriette Newell Woods; August 19, 1815; Andover, Massachusetts, U.S.
- Died: April 26, 1893 (aged 77); Brooklyn, New York, U.S.
- Resting place: Andover, Massachusetts, U.S.
- Education: Abbot Female Seminary
- Occupation: Writer
- Spouse: Abijah Richardson Baker (m. 1835–1876) his death
- Children: 5
- Writing career
- Language: English
- Genres: Novels, religious literature
- Notable works: Tim, the Scissors Grinder

Harriette Newell Woods Baker (pen names Mrs. Madeline Leslie and Aunt Hattie; née Woods; August 19, 1815 – April 26, 1893) was an American author of books for children, and editor. Her career as an author began when she was about 30 years old. She devoted herself successfully to novels; but after about 15 years, she wrote popular religious literature. Her most famous book, Tim, the Scissors Grinder, sold half a million copies, and was translated into several languages. Baker published about 200 moral and religious tales under the pen name "Mrs. Madeline Leslie". She also wrote under her own name or initials, and under pseudonym "Aunt Hattie". She wrote chiefly for the young, and was still writing in 1893 when she died.

== Early life and education ==
Harriette Newell Woods was born in Andover, Massachusetts on August 19, 1815 to Leonard Woods and Abigail Wheeler. She was one of the many children who were named after Harriet Newell, one of the first American missionaries. She was baptized on December 10, 1815 in Theological Seminary Church, which is now Philips Academy in Andover. Her father was the founder of Andover Theological Seminary and a friend of the polymath poet Oliver Wendell Holmes Sr. She was called "Hatty" during her younger years. According to an account from her father, she nearly died of typhoid fever when she was about two years old.

When she was a child, her family had a house guest, William Schauffler, a German Jew who was sent to her father's care for his theological education. He remained in Andover for several years and most of the time in the Woods' house. Harriette noticed Schauffler had a grey overcoat that was too small for him and that he was shivering in the cold. This incident inspired her to form a sewing society with her Sunday School classmate, Elizabeth Stuart, and earn money to buy a cloak for Schauffler.

After the sewing society, she and Stuart formed a literary society, which they named "The Fireside" with them being the only members. They met on alternate Wednesdays on which occasions they read a composition, a simple story, and discussed the styles with each other. This was before she published her work for the first time when she was eleven years old. She enclosed her short story to Deacon Nathaniel Willis with a note authorizing him to print it in his newspaper, The Youth’s Companion if he wished. She then received a US$1 for a short story to The Youth's Companion and The Puritan, the Congregational paper of that time. She provided other contributions, from time to time, without informing the editor of her age.

On June 17, 1829, when Baker was nearly fourteen, she, together with four sisters and a cousin, Almira Woods, set off for Abbot Female Seminary, the new academy founded by Mrs. Nehemiah Abbott, She attended it during its first year of existence, though age fifteen. She then removed to an academy in Catskill, New York, where her eldest sister, Mary G. W. Smith, lived. After this, she studied under the instruction of private tutors in mathematics, history, and philosophy.

== Career ==
At the age of 20, she married Rev. Abijah Richardson Baker, D. D., who was then a teacher in the Phillips Academy at Andover. She published during her residence in Medford, Massachusetts three small volumes, The String of Pearls, Louise Merton, and Frank Herbert. Of the second of these, the proof-reader in the office where it was printed, said: "I become so interested in the story that I forget to make the proper correction of typographical errors.” Her duties as a clergyman's wife and mother of five sons prevented her from realizing ambition further except for occasional articles.

In 1850, she removed to the city of Lynn, Massachusetts, where her husband was pastor of the Central Church. There she assisted him several years in editing two monthly journals: The Mother’s Assistant, and The Happy Home, which were extensively circulated. Many of her contributions to these periodicals were subsequently transferred to her volumes. From that period, she wrote and published constantly, her works being issued by different firms in Boston and New York City.

In 1855, she published under the name of "Mrs. Madeline Leslie", The Courtesies of Wedded Life. About the same time appeared anonymously another large volume, entitled Cora and the Doctor, which was ascribed to many persons of eminence. In plot and literary finish, in power and pathos, this is considered one of her happiest efforts, and called forth flattering notices and reviews from Washington Irving and other distinguished critics. The name of its author was repeatedly called for, and at length the call was answered by its issue with other volumes from her pen in a series entitled Home Life.

Many of her books had a religious or moral theme and her style was considered very true to life, with well drawn characters. Publishers of her books include Lee & Shepard. The wave of evangelical feeling that passed over New England consequent on the preaching of Dr. Finney, the evangelist, powerfully affected Baker, and turned her literary activities in religious channels. In the heyday of her success, the coming out of one of her books was looked upon as an event by her readers, and it was thought nothing remarkable to strike off an edition of 10,000 copies on the first appearance of a story whose title page bore the name of Madeline Leslie. Annual sales varied from 250,000 to 500,000.

Most of Baker's books were tales for Sunday-school and general reading. They attained great popularity, and several were republished in England, and were translated into German, French and Bohemian. Included in the list are the Silver Lake, Golden Spring, Brookside, as well as the "Tim" series and the "Leslie" stories. Tim: The Scissors Grinder was her most popular book, and (in the form of a cheap reprint) was sold or given away by thousands in England. Some of these were published over the pseudonyms "Mrs. Madeline Leslie" and "Aunt Hattie". Others, such as The Courtesies of Wedded Life (1855; new ed., 1869), and Cora and the Doctor, were published anonymously.

== Personal life ==
While in Catskill, she had a relationship with John Maynard, whose father, before his death, had been a friend to her father's. She ended the relationship when she was fifteen after hearing a sad account of John's behavior in Yale.

On October 1, 1835, she married Abijah Richardson Baker (died 1876), who for 15 years was pastor of the Congregational Church at Medford, Massachusetts. He established and built up the Central Congregational Church at Lynn, Massachusetts and was also at one period, minister of the East Street Church in Boston. She was very affected by her husband's death on April 30, 1876, that she wrote about his sickness, which was to quote in her language "bound in green in her library in Brooklyn". She had since then moved home five times.

Her son George Baker, and his wife, Maggie, had invited her to stay with them in Batavia. This was her first home and first journey alone. She arrived there around the winter of 1876–77. She went east the following summer and stayed with her son William Baker in Northborough before they all returned to Boston. She visited Washington during the following winter before she went to New York. In 1880, she was living with her son, Dr. Charles Baker, her daughter-in-law, Mary, and her granddaughter, Sarah, in Brooklyn, New York. In Brooklyn, she became greatly interested in a large sewing class in Charles' parish where she taught the class how to knit upon her son's request.

She had a daughter, Mollie, and five sons, four of whom were Episcopal clergymen: Dr. George Baker, rector of St. Luke's Hospital, New York; Dr. Charles E. Baker of the Church of the Messiah; and Dr. Frank Woods Baker and Dr. Walter A. Baker of Cincinnati. The non-clergy son, William Baker, M.D., was a Professor of Gynecology at Harvard University.

In late years, a new generation appeared, which was somewhat out of touch with the spirit of Baker's writings., as she was better known in the older literary circle of the US. Her literary tastes and keen zest for the study of human character and action remained with her even in later years. Possessing the Macaulayan faculty of plucking the very heart out of a book in a space of time that for others would hardly more than suffice for turning its pages, she found in reading an unfailing delight. She was reading Victor Hugo's novels this week at the rate of a book a day, and on the evening previous to her death held an animated conversation with her son, Dr. Charles E. Baker, about one of the characters in Les Misérables.

== Death ==
Baker died in Brooklyn on 26 April, 1893 at the home of her son, Dr. Charles E. Baker at 244 Washington Avenue.

According to her letters, on the evening of Tuesday, 11 April, two weeks before her death, she complained of feeling “poorly” and difficulty sleeping. Upon awakening, she coughed so incessantly that to quote in her own language, she “saw stars”. Becoming anxious, her daughter, Mollie, went over to St Luke's Hospital, New York, and secured a trained nurse. For a week after this bronchial attack, she felt very sick, and prepared for death.

A day before her death she was in unusually good spirits and felt so well that she left her room to walk with her daughter, Mollie through the hall into a back room to see a sunset, and spoke with George about Les Misérables. According to the nurse, she slept unusually well that night. In the morning at four, the nurse, who was called to her patient's bedside by her heavy breathing, lifted her up, as she had been directed to do at such times, when she said “I believe I am going to have another bad turn.” Then the nurse gave her some medicine and rubbed her, and at a quarter before five Harriette said, “Thank you. I am relieved. Now I think I can sleep.” These were her last words before she almost instantly fell asleep. A few minutes later, the nurse watching her was surprised that Harriette had quietly died.

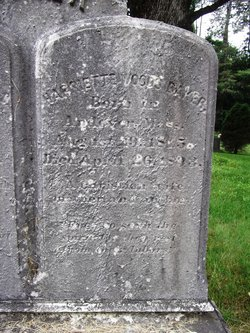
Harriette Woods Baker gravestone

Her funeral was conducted by eight clergymen of the Episcopal Church on Friday afternoon, 28 April, 1893. Her death was covered in the leading papers of the US and referenced in Andover academic institutions. She had US$10,000 in her possession, which she left to her family. Baker's grave was relocated to her birthplace of Andover, Massachusetts.

== Style and themes ==
Harriette's style was simple, chaste, even elegant; her characters lauded for their three-dimensionality. Many of her scenes were picturesque and impressive, compared to great authors. Moreover, her writings were all of moral tone but without mawkish sentimentality, though her style is centrally marked by the imparting of Christian understandings of the spiritual natures of man and woman as moral beings.

Reviewers compared her books for literary execution, moral aim, and influence, with those of Hannah More, Mary Martha Sherwood, and Charlotte Elizabeth. They inculcated high moral and religious sentiments, but were free from the dialectics of the schools, and from all sectarianism; and therefore were commonly found in the libraries regardless of Christian denomination.

Many of her books were republished in England and other countries. Few, if any, were more popular than Tim the Scissors-Grinder, later published in what was called the Tim Series. This volume first appeared as a serial in the Boston Recorder. Long before its completion in that paper, numerous applications were received from different publishing houses for the rights to publish the Tim Series in a book. Positive testimonials from across the US were received of its excellence and usefulness in the conversion of many.

== Selected works ==
- Cora and The Doctor; or, Revelations of A Physician's Wife (1855)
- Little Frankie Series (1860)
- Little Frankie and His Cousin (1860)
- Little Frankie and his Mother (1860)
- Little Frankie at School (1860)
- Little Frankie at His Plays (1860)
- Little Frankie on a Journey (1860)
- Robin Redbreast Series (1860)
- Little Robins' Love One to Another (1860)
- Little Robins Learning to Fly(1860)
- Courtesies of Wedded Life (1860)
- Lost but Found (1860)
- Walter and Frank (1860)
- Tim, the Scissors-Grinder (1861)
- Sequel to Tim the Scissors-Grinder (1862)
- Up the Ladder; or, Striving and Thriving (1862)
- The Two Homes; or. Earning and Spending (1862)
- Bound Girl, and other Stories (1862)
- Bound Boy and the Young Soldier (1862)
- The Prize Bible; or, Covetousness (1863)
- The Organ-Grinder (1863)
- Never Give Up; or, The Newsboys (1863)
- The Rag Pickers: and other stories (1863)
- Minnie's Pet Horse (1863)
- Minnie's Pet Lamb (1863)
- Minnie's Pet Cat (1863)
- Minnie's Pet Dog (1864)
- Minnie's Pet Parrot (1864)
- Minnie's Pet Monkey (1864)
- White and Black Lies; or, Truth Better than Falsehood (1864)
- Worth and Wealth; or, Jessie Dorr (1864)
- Tim's Sister; or, A Word in Season (1864)
- Light and Shade (1864)
- The Secret of Success (1865)
- Art and Artlessness (1865)
- Every-Day Duties; or, The Schoolmates (1865)
- Wheel of Fortune (1865)
- Juliette; or, Now and Forever (1866)
- Ingleside; or, Without Christ and With Him (1886)
- The Lost Kitty (1867)
- Frankie's dog Tony (1867)
- White and Black Lies (1867)
- Ida's New Shoes (1867)
- The Factory Boy (1867)
- Lily's Birthday (1867)
- The Pearl of Patience (1868)
- The Pearl of Love (1868)
- The Pearl of Peace (1868)
- The Pearl of Charity (1868)
- Bertie's Home; or, the Way to be Happy (1868)
- Good for evil: or, Rose Cottage (1868)
- Trying To Be Useful (1868)
- In the Wilderness (1868)
- Cora and the Doctor (1868)
- Governor's Pardon (1868)
- Paul Barton; or The Drunkard's Son (1869)
- Live and Learn (1869)
- Behind the Curtin (1869
- Fashion and Folly (1869)
- The Hard Sum, and other Stories (1869)
- The Breach of Trust (1869)
- The new buggy (1871)
- Diligent Dick (1871)
- Edith Withington: a Book for Girls (1871)
- Gem of Neatness: Or, The Cousins (1872)
- The Golden Pennies, and other stories (1872)
- The Chest of Tools (1880)
- Frankie's dog Tony (1880)
- Bertie and the Gardeners (1880)
- This and That (1887)
- Ingleside; or, Without Christ and with Him (1888)
- Minnie and Her Pets
- Little Agnes
- Aunt Hattie's Library for Girls
- Aunt Hattie's Library for Boys
- Walter and Frank; or, The Apthorp Farm
