= Nathaniel Willis (1780–1870) =

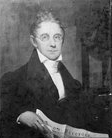
Portrait of Nathaniel Willis by Chester Harding, ca.1830

Nathaniel Willis (1780–1870) was an editor and publisher in Boston, Massachusetts, USA, in the 19th century. He established the Eastern Argus and the Boston Recorder newspapers, and The Youth's Companion magazine.

== Biography ==
Willis was born in Boston in 1780 to newspaperman Nathaniel Willis (1755–1831). In 1787 he moved to "Winchester, [Virginia], and was employed in [a] newspaper office, and subsequently at Martinsburg, [Virginia], on the Potomac Guardian". Young Nathaniel was put to work at once in folding papers and setting types. At Martinsburg he used to ride post, with tin horn and saddle-bags, delivering papers to scattered subscribers in the thinly settled country. At the age of fifteen young Nathaniel returned to Boston and entered the office of the Independent Chronicle. He also found time, while in Boston, to drill with the "Fusiliers". In 1803, invited by a Maine congressman and other gentlemen of the Republican Party, he went to Portland, [Maine], and established the Eastern Argus in opposition to the Federalists.

He married Hannah Parker in 1803; children included Nathaniel Parker Willis, Sara Willis Parton (Fanny Fern), Richard Storrs Willis, Lucy Douglas (born 1804), Louisa Harris (1807), Julia Dean (1809), Mary Perry (1813), Edward Payson (1816) and Ellen Holmes (1821).

Back in Boston in 1816, Willis established The Recorder newspaper, "published every Wednesday afternoon at no.76 State-Street, ... entrance through Mr. H. Messinger's Hat-Store or in the rear of the building from Wilson's Lane". Associates included Sidney E. Morse. He later moved to Congress Square. Willis sold the paper to Martin Moore in 1844.

In 1827 he established "a religious paper for children", The Youth's Companion (1827–1929). He served as editor "for about thirty years".

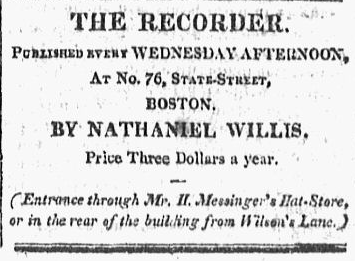
From The Recorder, 1816
