= Abijah Perkins Marvin =

American minister

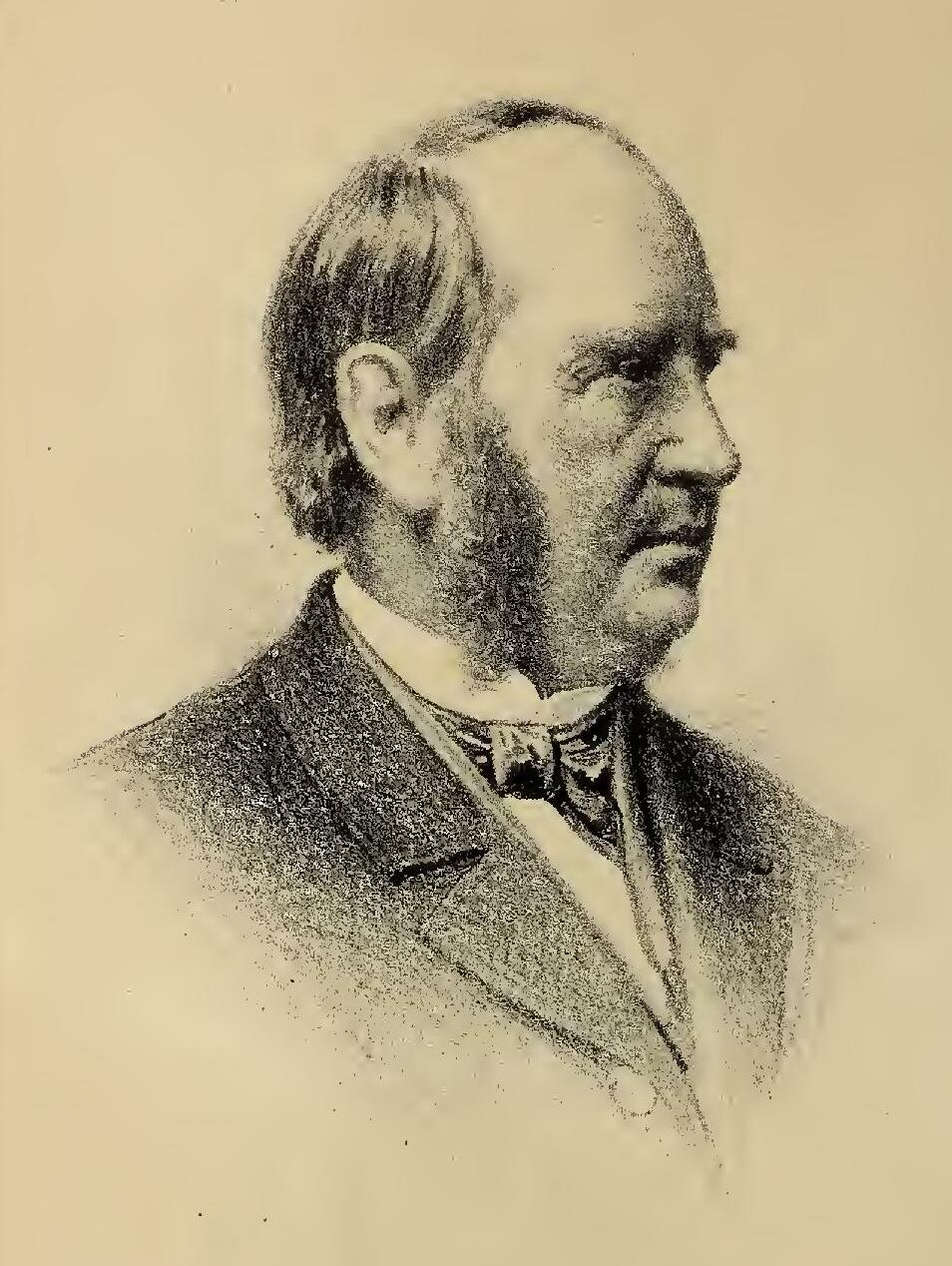
Portrait of Marvin published in 1868

Abijah Perkins Marvin (February 1, 1813 – October 19, 1889) was an American minister, writer, and teacher. He was a member of the Massachusetts Constitutional Convention of 1853, and a member of the New England Historic Genealogical Society.

== Early years and education ==
Abijah Perkins Marvin was born in Lyme, Connecticut, February 1, 1813. He was the son of Asahel and Azubah (Still) Marvin, and was descended from Reynold Marvin, who came from England to Hartford, Connecticut, in 1636, and was afterwards of Lyme. He attended the district school in Lyme, until he was fourteen years old; the next six years he spent in printing offices, doing all parts of the work. He fitted for college at the high school in Brattleboro, Vermont, and graduated at Washington (now Trinity) College in Hartford, in 1839. He took his master's degree in course.

== Career ==
Marvin taught in schools of all grades, district, high, and private, in the academy, and as a tutor in college. He taught a public school in Delaware, in 1832–1833, and a private school in Virginia, in 1840–1841. He studied theology at New Haven, graduating from the seminary there in 1842. He was ordained, in 1844, pastor of the Congregational Church, Winchendon, Massachusetts, and held this charge until 1866.

Marvin served for a year or two as agent of the American Congregational Association, and collected money for the purchase of a Congregational House. He was associate editor of the Boston Recorder, in 1867; and was at Worcester, without charge, in 1869–1870. He served as acting pastor of the Congregational Church in Lancaster, from 1870 to 1872, and was installed afterwards as its pastor. He was dismissed from this charge in 1875, but continued to reside in Lancaster. He was a member of the Massachusetts Constitutional Convention of 1853, representing Winchendon, and a Resident Member of New England Historic Genealogical Society from 1884.

Marvin married, March 5, 1845, Caroline, daughter of Micah and Roxy (Richardson) Holbrook. He died in Lancaster, Massachusetts, October 19, 1889.

== Selected works ==
Besides some sermons and articles in the New Englander and Bibliotkeca Sacra, he published a "History of Winchendon," a "History of Lancaster," and a history of "Worcester in the War of the Rebellion;" he also wrote a considerable portion of the "History of Worcester County." He left the manuscript of a "Life of Cotton Mather."

Marvin wrote the memoir for the posthumous publication of the poems of Nancy Amelia Woodbury Priest Wakefield which came into print in 1883.
