= Nathaniel Parker Willis =

American magazine writer, editor, and publisher (1806–1867)

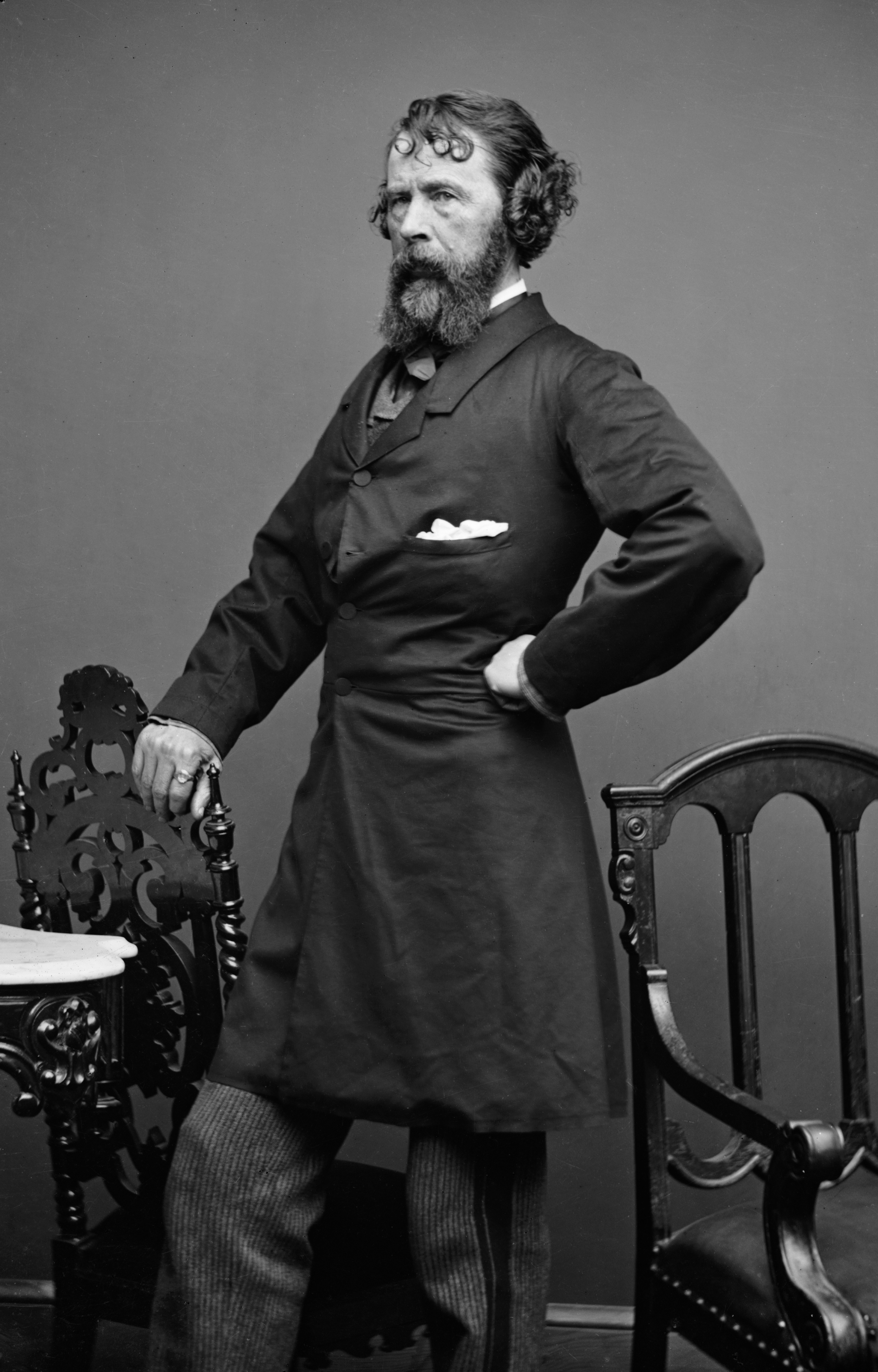
- Portrait of Willis c. mid-1850s
- Born: January 20, 1806; Portland, District of Maine, U.S.
- Died: January 20, 1867 (aged 61); Cornwall-on-Hudson, New York, U.S.
- Resting place: Mount Auburn Cemetery, Cambridge, Massachusetts
- Occupations: Editor; Literary critic Poet

Nathaniel Parker Willis (January 20, 1806 – January 20, 1867), also known as N. P. Willis, was an American writer, poet and editor who worked with several notable American writers including Edgar Allan Poe and Henry Wadsworth Longfellow. He became the highest-paid magazine writer of his day. His brother was the composer Richard Storrs Willis and his sister Sara wrote under the name Fanny Fern. Harriet Jacobs wrote her autobiography while being employed as his children's nurse.

Born in Portland in what was then the District of Maine, Willis came from a family of publishers. His grandfather Nathaniel Willis owned newspapers in Massachusetts and Virginia, and his father Nathaniel Willis was the founder of Youth's Companion, the first newspaper specifically for children. Willis developed an interest in literature while attending Yale College and began publishing poetry. After graduation, he worked as an overseas correspondent for the New York Mirror. He eventually moved to New York and began to build his literary reputation. Working with multiple publications, he was earning about $100 per article and between $5,000 and $10,000 per year. In 1846, he started his own publication, the Home Journal, which was eventually renamed Town & Country. Shortly after, Willis moved to a home on the Hudson River where he lived a semi-retired life until his death in 1867.

Willis embedded his own personality into his writing and addressed his readers personally, specifically in his travel writings, so that his reputation was built in part because of his character. Critics, including his sister in her novel Ruth Hall, occasionally described him as being effeminate and Europeanized. Willis also published several poems, tales, and a play. Despite his intense popularity for a time, at his death Willis was nearly forgotten.

== Life and career ==
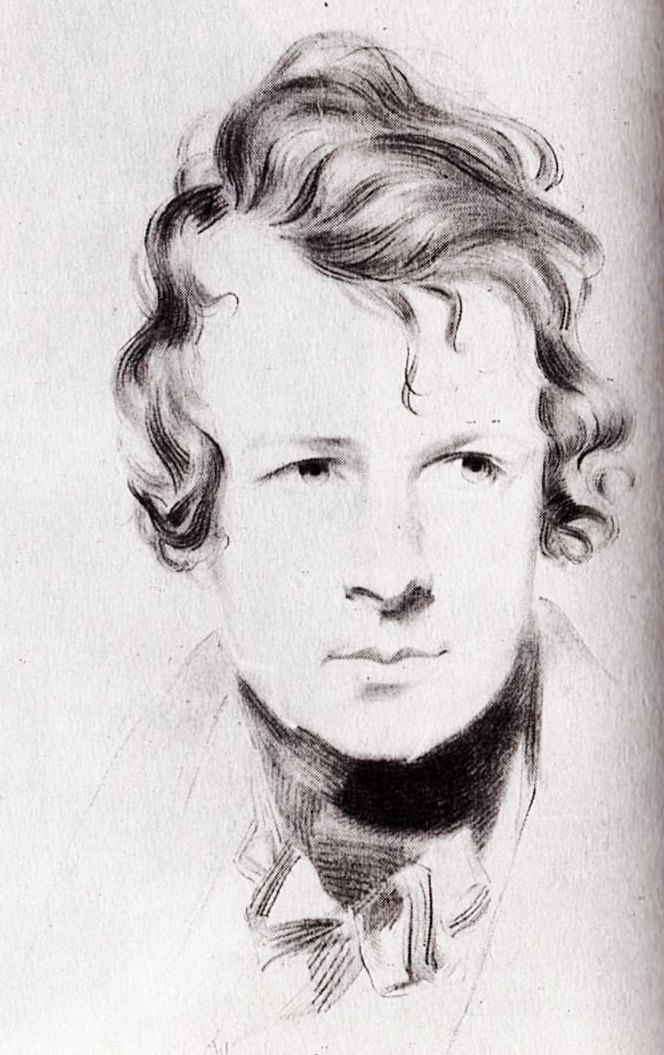
A young Nathaniel Parker Willis

=== Early life and family ===
Nathaniel Parker Willis was born on January 20, 1806, in Portland, Maine. His father Nathaniel Willis was a newspaper proprietor there and his grandfather owned newspapers in Boston, Massachusetts, and western Virginia. His mother was Hannah Willis (née Parker) from Holliston, Massachusetts, and it was her husband's offer to edit the Eastern Argus in Maine that caused their move to Portland. Willis's younger sister was Sara Willis Parton, who would later become a writer under the pseudonym Fanny Fern. His brother, Richard Storrs Willis, became a musician and music journalist known for writing the melody for "It Came Upon the Midnight Clear". His other siblings were Lucy Douglas (born 1804), Louisa Harris (1807), Julia Dean (1809), Mary Perry (1813), Edward Payson (1816), and Ellen Holmes (1821).

In 1816, the family moved to Boston, where Willis's father established the Boston Recorder and, nine years later, the Youth's Companion, the world's first newspaper for children. The elder Willis's emphasis on religious themes earned him the nickname "Deacon" Willis. After attending a Boston grammar school and Phillips Academy at Andover, Nathaniel Parker Willis entered Yale College in October 1823 where he roomed with Horace Bushnell. Willis credited Bushnell with teaching him the proper technique for sharpening a razor by "drawing it from heel to point both ways ... the two cross frictions correct each other". At Yale, he further developed an interest in literature, often neglecting his other studies. He graduated in 1827 and spent time touring parts of the United States and Canada. In Montreal, he met Chester Harding, with whom he would become a lifelong friend. Years later, Harding referred to Willis during this period as "the 'lion' of the town". Willis began publishing poetry in his father's Boston Periodical, often using one of two literary personalities under the pen names "Roy" (for religious subjects) and "Cassius" (for more secular topics). The same year, Willis published a volume of poetical Sketches.

=== Literary career ===
In the latter part of the 1820s, Willis began contributing more frequently to magazines and periodicals. In 1829, he served as editor for The Token, making him the only person to be editor in the gift book's 15-year history besides its founder, Samuel Griswold Goodrich. He used the position to solicit a short story from fellow Portland native, John Neal, who continued contributing tales and essays well into the 1830s. Also in 1829, Willis founded the American Monthly Magazine, which began publishing in April of that year until it was discontinued in August 1831. He blamed its failure on the "tight purses of Boston culture" and moved to Europe to serve as foreign editor and correspondent of the New York Mirror. In 1832, while in Florence, Italy, he met Horatio Greenough, who sculpted a bust of the writer. Between 1832 and 1836, Willis contributed a series of letters for the Mirror, about half of which were later collected as Pencillings by the Way, printed in London in 1835. The romantic descriptions of scenes and modes of life in Europe sold well despite the then high price tag of $7 a copy. The work became popular and boosted Willis's literary reputation enough that an American edition was soon issued.

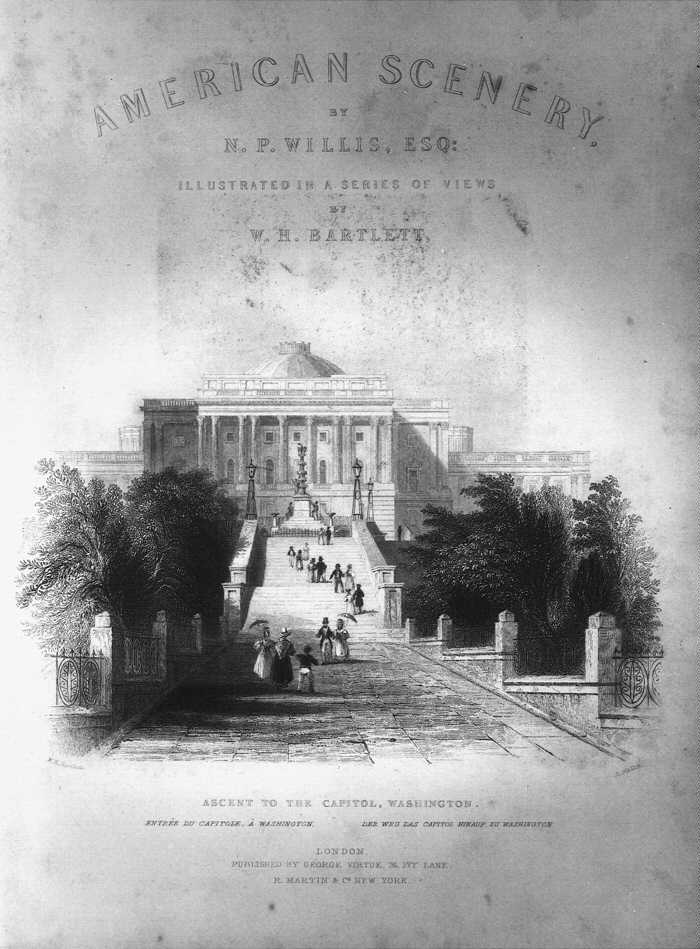
American Scenery by N. P. Willis with illustration by William Henry Bartlett, 1840

Despite this popularity, he was censured by some critics for indiscretion in reporting private conversations. At one point he fought a bloodless duel with Captain Frederick Marryat, then editor of the Metropolitan Magazine, after Willis sent a private letter of Marryat's to George Pope Morris, who had it printed. Still, in 1835 Willis was popular enough to introduce Henry Wadsworth Longfellow to important literary figures in England, including Ada Byron, daughter of Lord Byron.

While abroad, Willis wrote to a friend, "I should like to marry in England". He soon married Mary Stace, daughter of General William Stace of Woolwich, on October 1, 1835, after a month-long engagement. The couple took a two-week honeymoon in Paris. The couple moved to London where, in 1836, Willis met Charles Dickens, who was working for the Morning Chronicle at the time.

In 1837, Willis and his wife returned to the United States and settled at a small estate on Owego Creek in New York, just above its junction with the Susquehanna River. He named the home Glenmary and the 200-acre (0.81 km^{2}) rural setting inspired him to write Letters from under a Bridge. On October 20, 1838, Willis began a series of articles called "A New Series of Letters from London", one of which suggested an illicit relationship between writer Letitia Elizabeth Landon and editor William Jordan. The article caused some scandal, for which Willis's publisher had to apologize.

On June 20, 1839, Willis's play Tortesa, the Usurer premiered in Philadelphia at the Walnut Street Theatre. Edgar Allan Poe called it "by far the best play from the pen of an American author". That year, he was also editor of the short-lived periodical The Corsair, for which he enlisted William Makepeace Thackeray to write short sketches of France. Another major work, Two Ways of Dying for a Husband, was published in England during a short visit there in 1839–1840. Shortly after returning to the United States, his personal life was touched with grief when his first child was stillborn on December 4, 1840. He and Stace had a second daughter, Imogen, who was born June 20, 1842.

Later that year, Willis attended a ball in honor of Charles Dickens in New York. After dancing with Dickens's wife, Willis and Dickens went out for "rum toddy and broiled oysters". By this time, his fame had grown enough that he was often invited to lecture and recite poetry, including his presentation to the Linonian Society at Yale on August 17, 1841. Willis was invited to submit a column to the each weekly issue of Brother Jonathan, a publication from New York with 20,000 subscribers, which he did until September 1841. By 1842, Willis was earning the unusually high salary of $4,800 a year. As a later journalist remarked, this made Willis "the first magazine writer who was tolerably well paid".

=== Evening Mirror ===
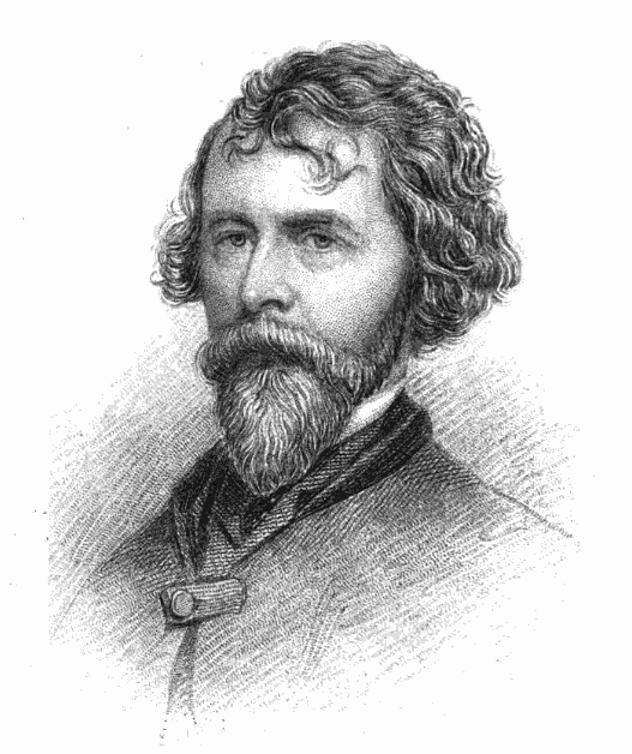
Willis became the highest-paid magazine writer in America.

Returning to New York City, Willis reorganized, along with George Pope Morris, the weekly New York Mirror as the daily Evening Mirror in 1844 with a weekly supplement called the Weekly Mirror, in part due to the rising cost of postage. By this time, Willis was a popular writer (a joke was that Johann Wolfgang von Goethe was Germany's version of N. P. Willis) and one of the first commercially successful magazine writers in America. In the fall of that year, he also became the first editor of the annual gift book The Opal founded by Rufus Wilmot Griswold. During this time, he became the highest-paid magazine writer in America, earning about $100 per article and $5,000 per year, a number which would soon double. Even the popular poet Longfellow admitted his jealousy of Willis's salary.

As a critic, Willis did not believe in including discussions of personalities of writers when reviewing their works. He also believed that, though publications should discuss political topics, they should not express party opinions or choose sides. The Mirror flourished at a time when many publications were discontinuing. Its success was due to the shrewd management of Willis and Morris and the two demonstrated that the American public could support literary endeavors. Willis was becoming an expert in American literature and so, in 1845, Willis and Morris issued an anthology, The Prose and Poetry of America.

While Willis was editor of the Evening Mirror, its issue for January 29, 1845, included the first printing of Poe's poem "The Raven" with his name attached. In his introduction, Willis called it "unsurpassed in English poetry for subtle conception, masterly ingenuity of versification, and consistent, sustaining of imaginative lift ... It will stick to the memory of everybody who reads it". Willis and Poe were close friends, and Willis helped Poe financially during his wife Virginia's illness and while Poe was suing Thomas Dunn English for libel. Willis often tried to persuade Poe to be less destructive in his criticism and concentrate on his poetry. Even so, Willis published many pieces of what would later be referred to as "The Longfellow War", a literary battle between Poe and the supporters of Henry Wadsworth Longfellow, whom Poe called overrated and guilty of plagiarism. Willis also introduced Poe to Fanny Osgood; the two would later carry out a very public literary flirtation.

Willis's wife Mary Stace died in childbirth on March 25, 1845. Their daughter, Blanche, died as well and Willis wrote in his notebook that she was "an angel without fault or foible". He took his surviving daughter Imogen to England to visit her mother's family. In October 1846, he married Cornelia Grinnell, a wealthy Quaker from New Bedford and the adopted daughter of a local Congressman. She was two decades younger than Willis at the time and vocally disliked slavery, unlike her new husband.

=== Home Journal ===
In 1846, Willis and Morris left the Evening Mirror and attempted to edit a new weekly, the National Press, which was renamed the Home Journal after eight months. Their prospectus for the publication, published November 21, 1846, announced their intentions to create a magazine "to circle around the family table". Willis intended the magazine for the middle and lower classes and included the message of upward social mobility, using himself as an example, often describing in detail his personal possessions. When discussing his own social climbing, however, he emphasized his frustrations rather than his successes, endearing him to his audience. He edited the Home Journal until his death in 1867. It was renamed Town & Country in 1901, and it is still published under that title as of 2020. During Willis's time at the journal, he especially promoted the works of women poets, including Frances Sargent Osgood, Anne Lynch Botta, Grace Greenwood, and Julia Ward Howe. Willis and his editors favorably reviewed many works now considered important today, including Henry David Thoreau's Walden and Nathaniel Hawthorne's The Blithedale Romance.

=== Idlewild ===
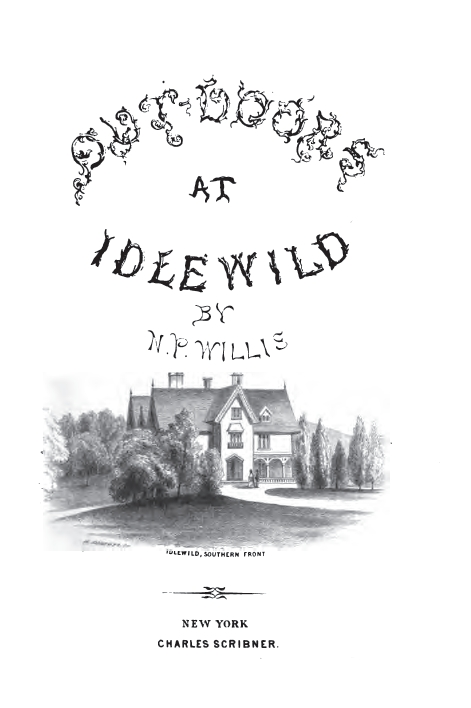
Willis purchased a home in 1846 which he named Idlewild. The home would later inspire the title of an 1855 book.

In 1846, Willis settled near the banks of Canterbury Creek near the Hudson River in New York and named his new home Idlewild. When Willis first visited the property, the owners said it had little value and that it was "an idle wild of which nothing could ever be made". He built a fourteen-room "cottage", as he called it, at the edge of a plateau by Moodna Creek next to a sudden 200-foot (61 m) drop into a gorge. Willis worked closely with the architect, Calvert Vaux, to carefully plan each gable and piazza to fully take advantage of the dramatic view of the river and mountains.

Because of failing health Willis spent the remainder of his life chiefly in retirement at Idlewild. His wife Cornelia was also recovering from a difficult illness after the birth of their first child together, a son named Grinnell, who was born April 28, 1848. They had four other children: Lilian (born April 27, 1850), Edith (born September 28, 1853), Bailey (born May 31, 1857), and a daughter who died only a few minutes after her birth on October 31, 1860.

In 1850, Cornelia Willis re-hired Harriet Jacobs, a fugitive slave from North Carolina, who had already before been working for the family as Imogen's nanny. When her legal owners came to New York in 1852 to force her back into slavery, Cornelia Willis bought her freedom for $300. While working for the Willis family at Idlewild, Jacobs wrote her autobiography, published in 1861. Her biographer, Jean Fagan Yellin, comments on the irony of the situation: "Idlewild had been conceived as a famous writer's retreat, but its owner never imagined that it was his children's nurse who would create an American classic there". Jacobs stayed with the Willis family until after the publication of her book. Cornelia Willis is called a "true ... friend" in the autobiography, and the friendship lasted into the next generation, ending only with the death of Louisa Jacobs at the home of Edith Willis Grinnell in 1917.

During these last years at Idlewild, Willis continued contributing a weekly letter to the Home Journal. In 1850 he assisted Rufus Wilmot Griswold in preparing an anthology of the works of Poe, who had died mysteriously the year before. Griswold also wrote the first biography of Poe in which he purposely set out to ruin the dead author's reputation. Willis was one of the most vocal of Poe's defenders, writing at one point: "The indictment (for it deserves no other name) is not true. It is full of cruel misrepresentations. It deepens the shadows unto unnatural darkness, and shuts out the rays of sunshines that ought to relieve them".

Willis was involved in the 1850 divorce suit between the actor Edwin Forrest and his wife Catherine Norton Sinclair Forrest. In January 1849, Forrest had found a love letter to his wife from fellow actor George W. Jamieson. As a result, he and Catherine separated in April 1849. He moved to Philadelphia and filed for divorce in February 1850 though the Pennsylvania legislature denied his application. Catharine went to live with the family of Parke Godwin and the separation became a public affair, with newspapers throughout New York reporting on supposed infidelities and other gossip.

Willis defended Catharine, who maintained her innocence, in the Home Journal and suggested that Forrest was merely jealous of her intellectual superiority. On June 17, 1850, shortly after Forrest had filed for divorce in the New York Supreme Court, Forrest beat Willis with a gutta-percha whip in New York's Washington Square, shouting "this man is the seducer of my wife". Willis, who was recovering from a rheumatic fever at the time, was unable to fight back. His wife soon received an anonymous letter with an accusation that Willis was in an adulterous relationship with Catherine Forrest. Willis later sued Forrest for assault and, by March 1852, was awarded $2,500 plus court costs. Throughout the Forrest divorce case, which lasted six weeks, several witnesses made additional claims that Catherine Forrest and Nathaniel Parker Willis were having an affair, including a waiter who claimed he had seen the couple "lying on each other". As the press reported, "thousands and thousands of the anxious public" awaited the court's verdict; ultimately, the court sided with Catherine Forrest and Willis's name was cleared.

=== Ruth Hall ===
Willis arbitrarily refused to print the work of his sister Sara Willis ("Fanny Fern") after 1854, though she previously had contributed anonymous book reviews to the Home Journal. She had recently been widowed, became destitute, and was publicly denounced by her abusive second husband. Criticizing what he perceived as her restlessness, Willis once made her the subject of his poem "To My Wild Sis". As Fanny Fern, she had published Fern Leaves, which sold over 100,000 copies the year before. Willis, however, did not encourage his sister's writings. "You overstrain the pathetic, and your humor runs into dreadful vulgarity sometimes ... I am sorry that any editor knows that a sister of mine wrote some of these which you sent me", he wrote. In 1854 she published Ruth Hall, a Domestic Tale of the Present Time, a barely concealed semi-autobiographical account of her own difficulties in the literary world. Nathaniel Willis was represented as "Hyacinth Ellet", an effeminate, self-serving editor who schemes to ruin his sister's prospects as a writer. Willis did not publicly protest but in private he asserted that, despite his fictitious equivalent, he had done his best to support his sister during her difficult times, especially after the death of her first husband.

Among his later works, following in his traditional sketches about his life and people he has met, were Hurry-Graphs (1851), Out-Doors at Idlewild (1854), and Ragbag (1855). Willis had complained that his magazine writing prevented him from writing a longer work. He finally had the time in 1856, and he wrote his only novel, Paul Fane, which was published a year later. The character Bosh Blivins, who served as comic relief in the novel, may have been based on painter Chester Harding. His final work was The Convalescent (1859), which included a chapter on his time spent with Washington Irving at Sunnyside.

=== Final years and death ===
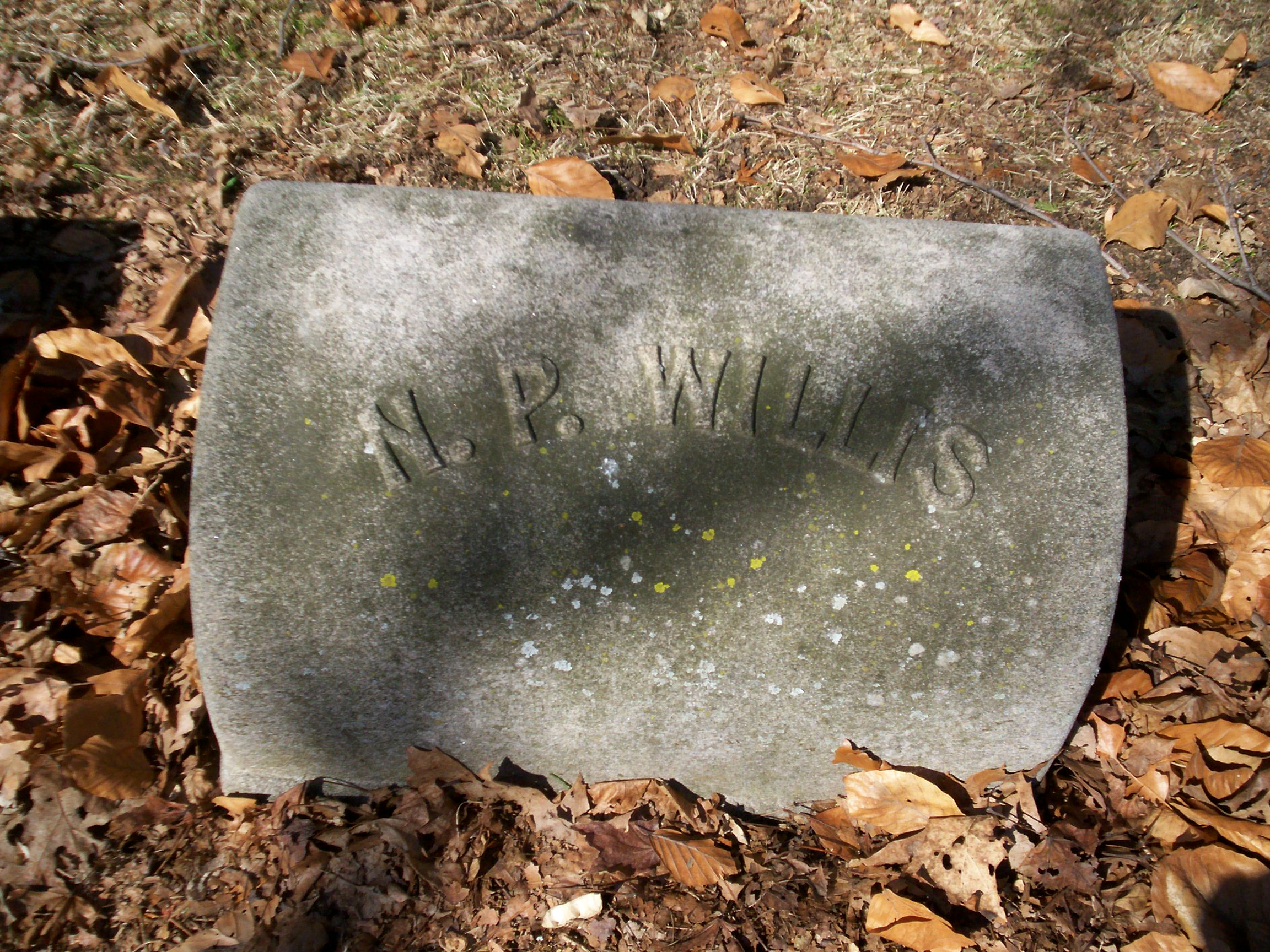
Grave of Nathaniel Parker Willis

In July 1860, Willis took his last major trip. Along with his wife, he stopped in Chicago and Yellow Springs, Ohio, as far west as Madison, Wisconsin, and also took a steamboat down the Mississippi River to St. Louis, Missouri, and returned through Cincinnati, Ohio, and Pittsburgh, Pennsylvania. In 1861, Willis allowed the Home Journal to break its pledge to avoid taking sides in political discussions when the Confederate States of America was established, calling the move a purposeful act to bring on war. On May 28, 1861, Willis was part of a committee of literary figures—including William Cullen Bryant, Charles Anderson Dana, and Horace Greeley—to invite Edward Everett to speak in New York on behalf of maintaining the Union. The Home Journal lost many subscribers during the American Civil War, Morris died in 1864, and the Willis family had to take in boarders and for a time turned Idlewild into a girls' school for income.

Willis was very sick in these final years: he suffered from violent epileptic seizures and, early in November 1866, fainted in the streets. Willis died on his 61st birthday, January 20, 1867, and was buried in Mount Auburn Cemetery in Cambridge, Massachusetts. Four days later, the day of his funeral, all bookstores in the city were closed as a token of respect. His pallbearers included Longfellow, James Russell Lowell, Oliver Wendell Holmes, Samuel Gridley Howe, and James T. Fields.

== Reputation ==
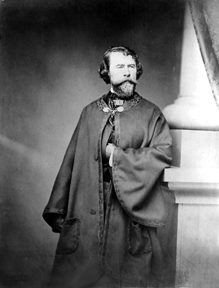
Daguerreotype of Willis, circa 1857

Throughout his literary career, Willis was well liked and known for his good nature among friends. Well traveled and clever, he had a striking appearance at six feet tall and was typically dressed elegantly. Many, however, remarked that Willis was effeminate, Europeanized, and guilty of "Miss Nancyism". One editor called him "an impersonal passive verb—a pronoun of the feminine gender". A contemporary caricature depicted him wearing a fashionable beaver hat and tightly closed coat and carrying a cane, reflecting Willis's wide reputation as a "dandy". Willis put considerable effort into his appearance and his fashion sense, presenting himself as a member of an upcoming American aristocracy. As Oliver Wendell Holmes Sr. once said, Willis was "something between a remembrance of Count D'Orsay and an anticipation of Oscar Wilde". Publisher Charles Frederick Briggs once wrote that "Willis was too Willisy". He described his writings as the "novelty and gossip of the hour" and was not necessarily concerned about facts but with the "material of conversation and speculation, which may be mere rumor, may be the truth". Willis's behavior in social groups annoyed fellow poet Henry Wadsworth Longfellow. "He is too artificial", Longfellow wrote to his friend George Washington Greene. "And his poetry has now lost one of its greatest charms for me—its sincerity". E. Burke Fisher, a journalist in Pittsburgh, wrote that "Willis is a kind of national pet and we must regard his faults as we do those of a spoiled stripling, in the hope that he will amend".

Willis built up his reputation in the public at a time when readers were interested in the personal lives of writers. In his writings, he described the "high life" of the "Upper Ten Thousand", a phrase he coined. His travel writings in particular were popular for this reason as Willis was actually living the life he was describing and recommending to readers. Even so, he manufactured a humble and modest persona, questioned his own literary merit, and purposely used titles, such as Pencillings by the Way and Dashes at Life With Free Pencil, which downplayed their own quality. His informally toned editorials, which covered a variety of topics, were also very successful. Using whimsicality and humor, he was purposely informal to allow his personality to show in his writing. He addressed his readers personally, as if having a private conversation with them. As he once wrote: "We would have you ... indulge us in our innocent egotism as if it were all whispered in your private ear and over our iced Margaux". When women poets were becoming popular in the 1850s, he emulated their style and focused on sentimental and moral subjects.

In the publishing world, Willis was known as a shrewd magazinist and an innovator who focused on appealing to readers' special interests while still recognizing new talent. In fact, Willis became the standard by which other magazinists were judged. According to writer George William Curtis, "His gayety [sic] and his graceful fluency made him the first of our proper 'magazinists'". For a time, it was said that Willis was the "most-talked-about author" in the United States. Poe questioned Willis's fame, however. "Willis is no genius–a graceful trifler–no more", he wrote in a letter to James Russell Lowell. "In me, at least, he never excites an emotion." Minor Southern writer Joseph Beckham Cobb wrote: "No sane person, we are persuaded, can read his poetry". Future senator Charles Sumner reported: "I find Willis is much laughed at for his sketches". Even so, most contemporaries recognized how prolific he was as a writer and how much time he put into all of his writings. James Parton said of him:

Of all the literary men whom I have ever known, N. P. Willis was the one who took the most pains with his work. It was no very uncommon thing for him to toil over a sentence for an hour; and I knew him one evening to write and rewrite a sentence for two hours before he had got it to his mind.

By 1850 and with the publication of Hurry-Graphs, Willis was becoming a forgotten celebrity. In August 1853, future President James A. Garfield discussed Willis's declining popularity in his diary: "Willis is said to be a licentious man, although an unrivaled poet. How strange that such men should go to ruin, when they might soar perpetually in the heaven of heavens". After Willis's death, obituaries reported that he had outlived his fame. One remarked, "the man who withdraws from the whirling currents of active life is speedily forgotten". This obituary also stated that Americans "will ever remember and cherish Nathaniel P. Willis as one worthy to stand with Fenimore Cooper and Washington Irving". In 1946, the centennial issue of Town & Country reported that Willis "led a generation of Americans through a gate where weeds gave way to horticulture". More modern scholars have dismissed Willis's work as "sentimental prattle" or refer to him only as an obstacle in the progress of his sister Fanny Fern as well as Harriet Jacobs. As biographer Thomas N. Baker wrote, Willis is today only referred to as a footnote in relation to other authors.

== Selected list of works ==
Prose

- Sketches (1827)
- Pencillings by the Way (1835)
- Inklings of Adventure (1836)
- À l'Abri; or, The Tent Pitched (1839)
- Loiterings of Travel (1840)
- The Romance of Travel (1840)
- American Scenery (2 volumes 1840)
- Canadian Scenery (2 volumes 1842)
- Dashes at Life with a Free Pencil (1845)
- Rural Letters and Other Records of Thoughts at Leisure (1849)
- People I Have Met (1850)
- Life Here and There (1850)
- Hurry-Graphs (1851)
- Summer Cruise in the Mediterranean (1853)
- Fun-Jottings; or, Laughs I Have Taken a Pen to (1853)
- Health Trip to the Tropics (1854)
- Ephemera (1854)
- Famous Persons and Places (1854)
- Out-Doors at Idlewild; or, The Shaping of a Home on the Banks of the Hudson (1855)
- The Rag Bag. A Collection of Ephemera (1855)
- Paul Fane; or, Parts of a Life Else Untold. A Novel (1857)
- The Convalescent (1859)

Plays

- Bianca Visconti; or, The Heart Overtasked. A Tragedy in Five Acts (1839)
- Tortesa; or, The Usurer Matched (1839)

Poetry

- Fugitive Poetry (1829)
- Melanie and Other Poems (1831)
- The Sacred Poems of N. P. Willis (1843)
- Poems of Passion (1843)
- Lady Jane and Humorous Poems (1844)
- The Poems, Sacred, Passionate, and Humorous (1868)
