= Edmund Sears =

American minister (1810–1876)

Edmund Hamilton Sears
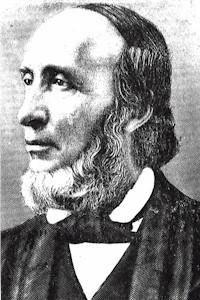
- Edmund Hamilton Sears
- Born: April 6, 1810; Sandisfield, Massachusetts
- Died: January 14, 1876 (aged 65); Weston, Massachusetts
- Occupation: Unitarian minister
- Notable work: "It Came Upon the Midnight Clear"

Edmund Hamilton Sears (April 6, 1810 – January 14, 1876) was an American Unitarian parish minister and author who wrote a number of theological works influencing 19th-century liberal Protestants. Today, Sears is primarily known as the man who penned the words to "It Came Upon the Midnight Clear" in 1849. It has been sung to two tunes, one by Richard Storrs Willis and another adapted by Arthur Sullivan from a traditional English air.

Sears originally wrote the song as a melancholy reflection on his times while a minister in Wayland, Massachusetts, US. However, "It Came Upon the Midnight Clear" has since become a popular Christmas carol.

== Biography ==
It Came upon the Midnight Clear
Instrumental – Piano, Violin, and English Horn

Born on April 6, 1810, the youngest of three sons of Joseph and Lucy (Smith) Sears, Edmund grew up on a farm within sight of the Berkshire Hills, in Sandisfield, Massachusetts. Sears attended Union College, in Schenectady, New York, where he was a member of the Delta Phi fraternity. Following graduation from Union in 1834, Sears studied law for nine months under a lawyer in Sandisfield. He attended Harvard Divinity School, graduating in 1837 and began to preach as a missionary in Toledo, Ohio, remaining nearly a year. He served the Greater Boston Unitarian congregation in Wayland, and then the larger congregation of First Church of Christ, Unitarian, in Lancaster. After seven years of hard work, he suffered a breakdown and returned to Wayland. He wrote "It Came Upon the Midnight Clear" while serving as a part-time preacher in Wayland. The hymn has since become a popular Christmas carol.

In addition to the above noted hymn, Sears authored the following publications: Fire-side Colloquies (1847); Regeneration (1853); Calm on the Listening Ear of Night; Pictures of the Olden Time (1857); Athanasia (1858); and Sermons and Songs of the Christian Life (1875). With Rev. R. Ellis he edited The Monthly Religious Magazine for twelve years.

Sears found Christ best presented in the Gospel of John. The Fourth Gospel the Heart of Christ (1872) was his most widely read work.

Sears preached the equality of women and men. After the Fugitive Slave Law was passed, Sears declared from his pulpit that "when the human and the Divine law were in conflict it was the duty of all to obey the latter." On Sunday, June 15, 1856, Sears delivered a sermon entitled "Discourse" which not only condemned chattel slavery as evil, but also the slaveholders whom he called the "slave power". The sermon was deemed to be such a strong argument against slavery that it was published and circulated as a pamphlet by Massachusetts abolitionists. "When wrong has become so organized as to make the state its permanent body", said Sears, then the state's functions and the men holding offices do the bidding of wrong and of evil. Sears continued, "humanity dies out of it [the state], and demonism becomes its life and soul".

He died January 14, 1876, in Weston, Massachusetts.

== Bibliography ==
- History of the Church in Weston (1909)
- Eliot, Samuel A. Heralds of a Liberal Faith, vol. 3 (1910).
- Robins, Chandler "Memoir of Rev. Edmund Hamilton Sears," Proceedings of the Massachusetts Historical Society 18 (1891).
- Christ-Janer, Albert et al., comps., American Hymns Old and New (2 vols., 1980)
- Cooke, George W., Unitarianism in America (1902);
- Wright, C. Conrad. The Liberal Christians (1970)
- Wright, Conrad Edick. American Unitarianism, 1805–1865 (1989).
