= Nancy H. Adsit =

American art lecturer, art educator, writer

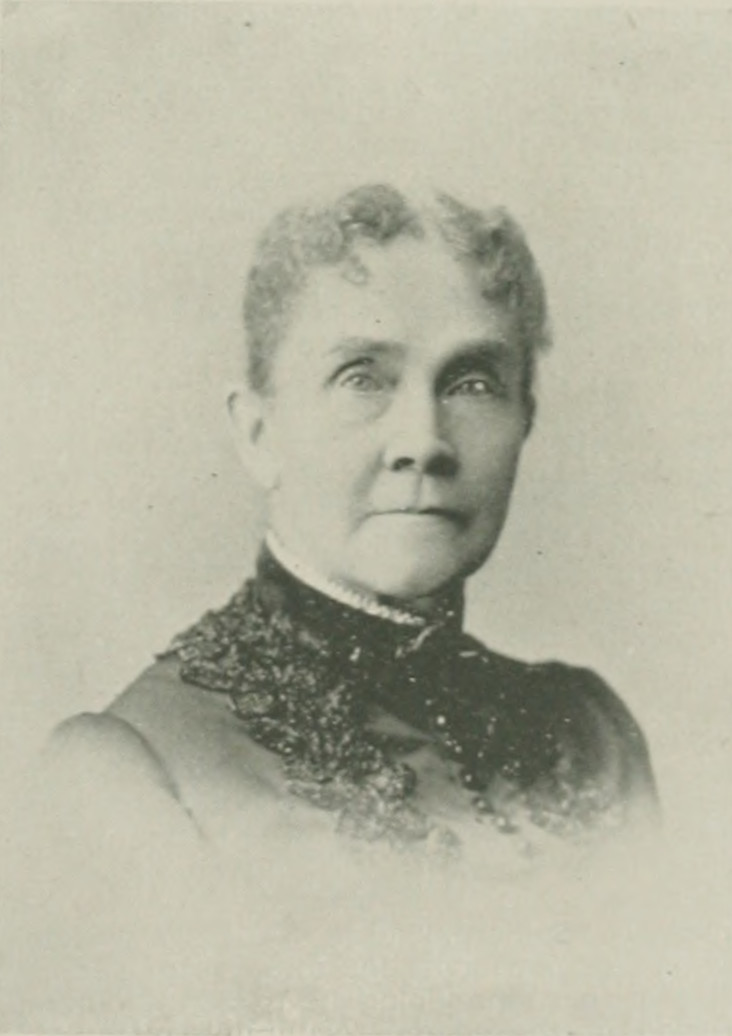
- Photo in A Woman of the Century
- Born: Nancy H. Warren; May 21, 1825; Palermo, New York, U.S.
- Died: April 27, 1902 (aged 76); Milwaukee, Wisconsin, U.S.
- Resting place: Forest Home Cemetery, Milwaukee
- Occupations: art lecturer, art educator, writer
- Spouse: Charles Davenport Adsit (m. 1862; died 1873)
- Writing career
- Pen name: Probus

Nancy H. Adsit (née, Warren; pen name, Probus; May 21, 1825 – April 27, 1902) was a 19th-century American art lecturer, art educator, and writer who contributed for half a century to art literature. Some of her early writings aroused antagonism, and her identity was withheld by her editor. It was not until many years later that she acknowledged their authorship. Adsit was the first woman to enter the insurance field in the United States, and, as far as is known, in the world. On the death of her husband, Charles Davenport Adsit, in 1873, she assumed the entire charge of his business and general insurance agency. After a very successful career in this line, she sold the business and resumed her writing. She contributed to the London Art Journal, writing an interesting series of articles for them on "The Black and White in Art" or "Etching and Engraving". This brought demands for lectures and parlor talks on art, and she began a course of classes for study. For many years, she delivered these lectures in the principal cities of the U.S., and her name was prominently connected with art education both in the U.S. and abroad.

== Early life and education ==
Nancy H. Warren was born in Palermo, New York, May 21, 1825. She was of New England Puritan lineage, and was descended from the Mayflower Robinsons on her mother's side, and from the patriotic Warrens of Massachusetts on her father's side, her father being a clergyman and missionary. Her early life was a discipline in self-dependence, which aided and stimulated the development of an inherited force of character, enabling her to combat and conquer adverse conditions, overcome obstacles and from childhood mark out for herself and pursue steadily a career that achieved success.

At the age of 13, she assumed entire charge of herself and her fortunes. The expenses of her collegiate study at Ingham University were met by teaching and journalism.

== Career ==
Adsit was a regular contributor to the columns of the New York City Baptist Register, the Boston Recorder, the New-York Tribune and the Western Literary Messenger. Her earlier work was mostly in the line of poetic effusions and several series of "lay sermons" under the signature of "Probus." These sermons aroused intense antagonism in clerical circles, on account of their latitudinarianism on theologic questions. Heated and prolonged discussions followed each publication. "Probus," the unknown, was adjudged by a general council "guilty of heresy," and the sermons were denounced and condemned. The series was completed, however, and her identity was held between herself and the editor, and not until many years later, by her own voluntary confession, was the writer identified. Meanwhile, the thought of the clergy, along with the world at large, had broadened, and the sermons were no longer under proscription.

She married Charles Davenport Adsit, of Buffalo, New York, December 13, 1862. Her home during the next three years was at 11 North Division Street, in that city. Alternating literary, charitable and church work with her domestic duties, she developed an ideal home. They moved to Milwaukee, Wisconsin in 1865, where her husband died in 1873, leaving his widow charged with large responsibilities. Adsit immediately assumed the entire charge and management of a general insurance agency. Protests from family friends and jealous antagonisms on the part of business competitors met her at the threshold of the work, but she won public favor as she gave assurance of ability until the work was crowned with such success as to leave no cause for its further prosecution. Accordingly, Adsit sold the business, with her good will, and resumed writing. Her range of work reached from the political questions of the day to science and art. Her contributions to the London Art Journal for many years brought a request for a series of articles on the "White and Black in Art," or "Etching and Engraving". Finding no satisfactory data for thorough investigation in books, she visited the studios of artists, as well as the workshops of engravers, gathering firsthand the necessary information, even to the practical use of the tools of each craft. An entire year was consumed in this preparatory work.

She was possessed of an unusual combination: great literary ability and excellent business sense. Months before the articles were completed, the demand for parlor conversation on the topics which so absorbed her induced Adsit to open her home to groups of ladies and gentlemen, who cared to take up the study in earnest. The field of her labor gradually broadened, and from 1880, she gave lecture courses in nearly all the principal cities of the U.S.. Her name became prominently identified with art education, both in the U.S. and abroad. While Adsit disclaimed being an artist, she was a competent and thorough critic and elucidator of art. Her criticisms of prints, especially, were sought by connoisseurs and collectors. The secret of her success lay in the fact that her work was simply the expression of her own personality, including an abounding enthusiasm which carried her audiences. In a report of its Wisconsin secretary to the Association for the Advancement of Women, of which Adsit is one of the vice-presidents, the writer said: "To Mrs. C. D. Adsit's work is due, directly or indirectly, most of the art interest in our State as well as the entire West." Her own adverse experiences quickened and enlarged her sympathies toward all working women, to whom she gave not only wholesome advice, but also substantial aid. Her home in Milwaukee was a center of art and of social interchange.

== Death ==
She died April 27, 1902, in Milwaukee, Wisconsin, and was buried at Forest Home Cemetery, Milwaukee.
