= Richard Storrs Willis =

American hymn music composer (1819–1900)

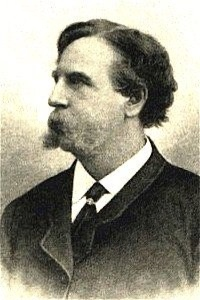
Image of Richard Storrs Willis

Richard Storrs Willis (February 10, 1819 – May 10, 1900) was an American composer, mainly of hymn music. His best known melody is probably the one called, simply, Carol. This is the standard tune, in the United States, though not in Great Britain, of the much-loved hymn "It Came Upon the Midnight Clear" (1850), with lyrics by Edmund Sears. He was also a music critic and journal editor.

== Biography ==
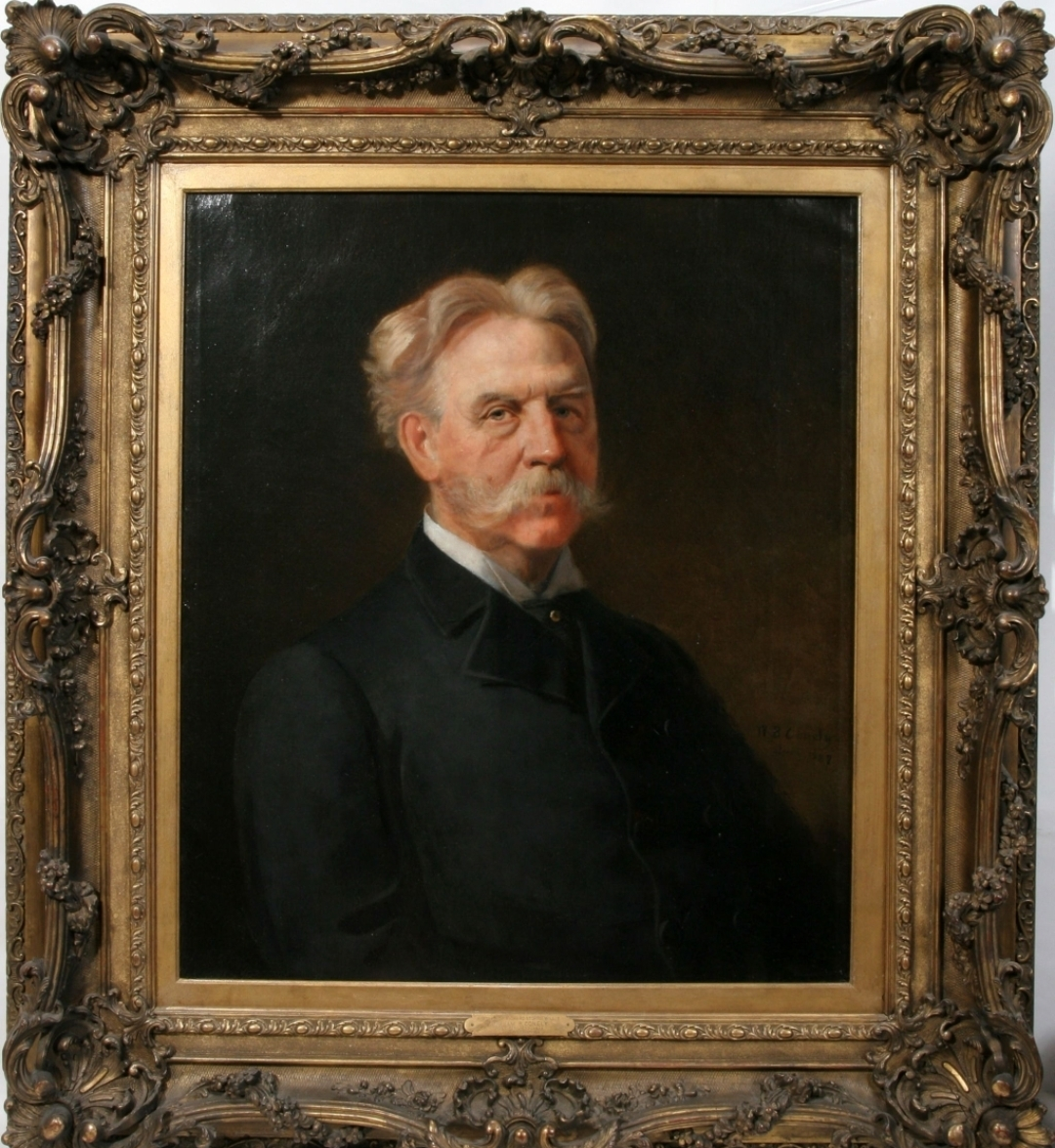
1887 "Portrait of Richard Storrs Willis" by William Brewster Conely. Previously in the Detroit Institute of Arts (1906-1992).

Willis, whose siblings included Nathaniel Parker Willis and Fanny Fern, was born on February 10, 1819, in Boston, Massachusetts. He attended Chauncey Hall, the Boston Latin School, and Yale College where he was a member of Skull and Bones in 1841.

Willis then went to Germany, where he studied six years under Xavier Schnyder and Moritz Hauptmann. After returning to America, Willis served as music critic for the New York Tribune, The Albion, and The Musical Times, for which he served as editor for a time. He joined the New-York American-Music Association, an organization which promoted the work native of naturalized American composers. He reviewed the organization's first concert for their second season, held December 30, 1856, in the Musical World, as a "creditable affair, all things considered".

Willis began his own journal, Once a Month: A Paper of Society, Belles-Lettres and Art, and published its first issue in January 1862.

== Death ==
Willis died on May 7, 1900. He is buried at Woodlawn Cemetery, in Detroit.

== Works ==
His works and music compilations include:

- Church Chorals and Choir Studies (1850)
- Our Church Music (1856)
- Waif of Song (1876)
- Pen and Lute (1883)
