= Boston True Flag =

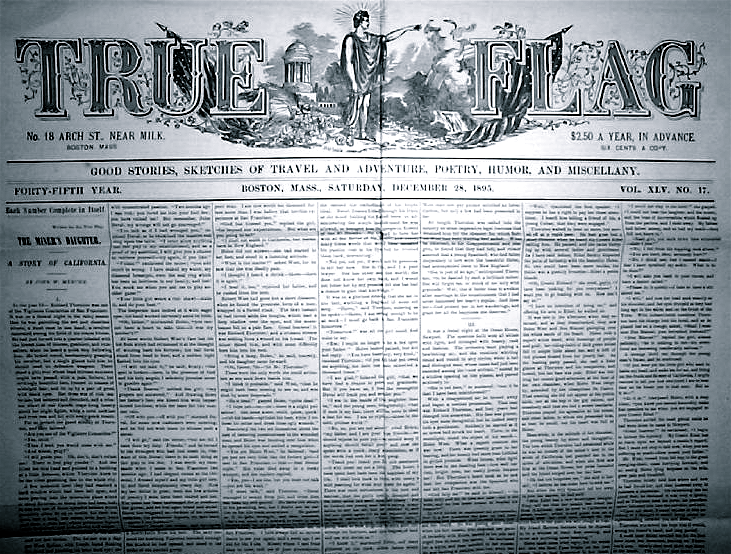
True Flag, 1895: "Good stories, sketches of travel and adventure, poetry, humor and miscellany"

The Boston True Flag (1851-1908) or True Flag was a weekly fiction periodical published in Boston, Massachusetts, in the 19th century. Contributors included Francis A. Corey, Susan E. Dickinson, Fanny Fern, Louise Chandler Moulton, Oliver Optic, and John Townsend Trowbridge. Publishers William U. Moulton, J. R. Elliott, Martin V. Lincoln, and J. W. Nichols produced the paper from offices on School Street (c. 1852–1864), Bromfield Street (c. 1868–1884), and Arch Street (c. 1887–1908).

The paper circulated widely enough to attract the notice of Mark Twain, who mentions it in his 1855 sketch "Jul'us Cesar": "He was decidedly literary, after a fashion of his own, and the gems which find their way before the public through the medium of the Flag of Our Union, and Boston True Flag ... were food and drink to his soul."

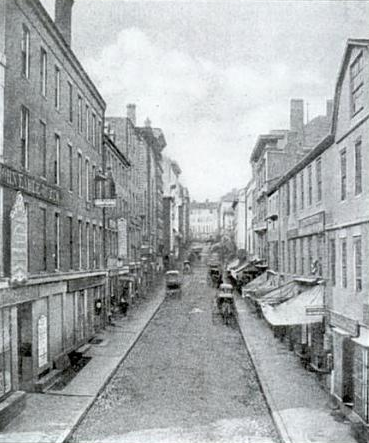
School Street, Boston, c. 1858

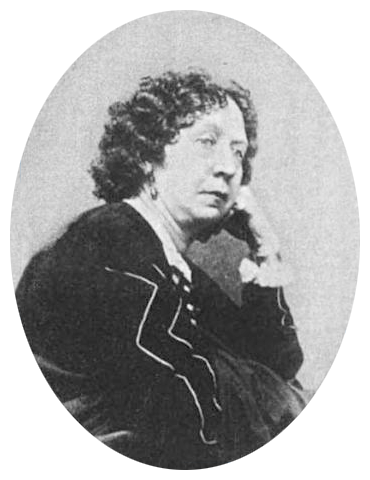
Fanny Fern, writer

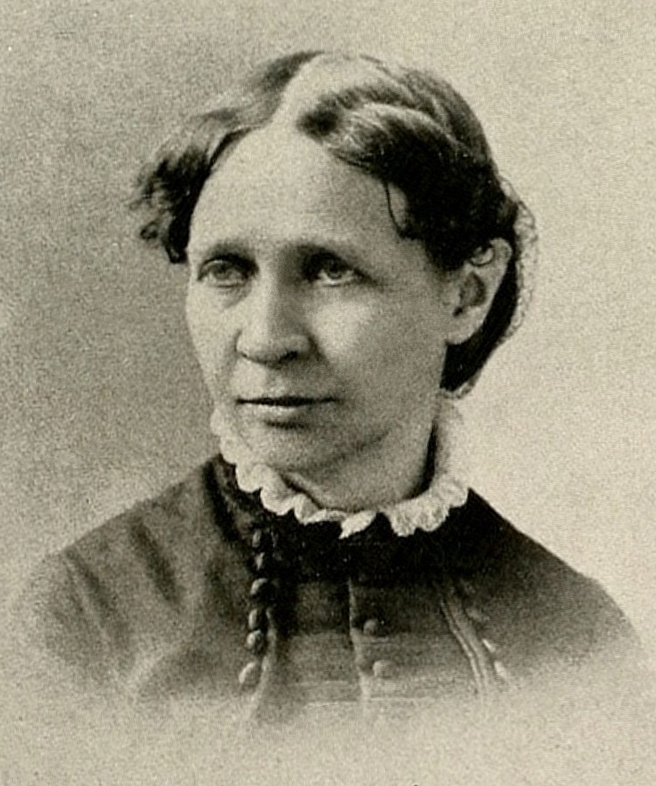
Susan E. Dickinson, writer, c. 1893

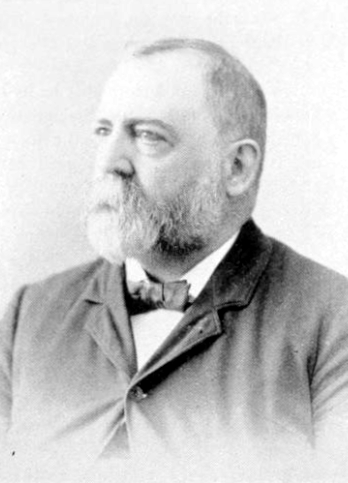
J. W. Nichols, publisher
