= The Youth's Companion =

American children's magazine

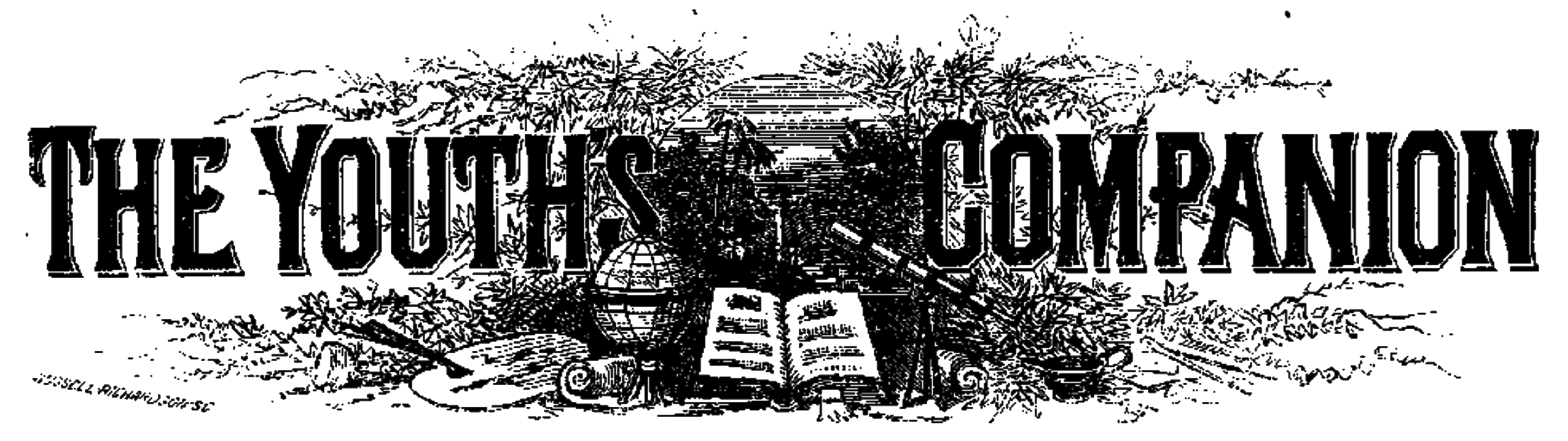

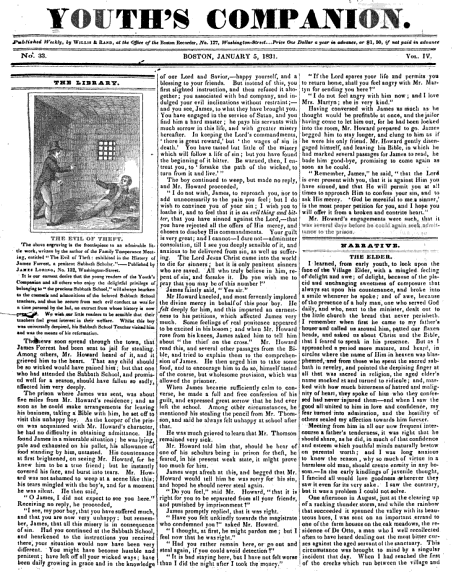
- Youth's Companion, 1831
- Categories: children's magazine
- Founder: Perry Mason
- First issue: 1827
- Final issue: 1929
- Company: Perry Mason & Co.
- Country: United States
- Based in: Boston
- Language: English

The Youth's Companion (1827–1929), known in later years as simply The Companion—For All the Family, was an American children's magazine that existed for over one hundred years until it finally merged with The American Boy in 1929. The Companion was published in Boston, Massachusetts, by Perry Mason & Co., later renamed "Perry Mason Company" after the founder died. The revised name first appears on the August 9, 1900 issue. From 1892 to 1915 it was based in the Youth's Companion Building, which is now on the National Register of Historic Places.

== History ==
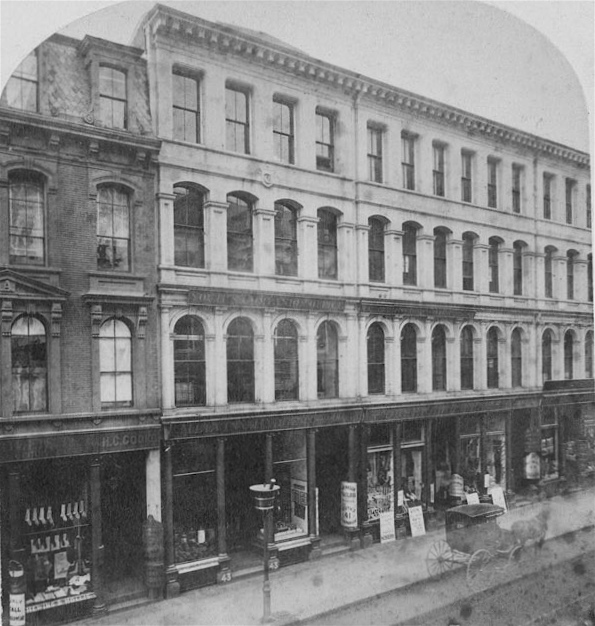
Companion publishing office, Boston, c. 1870s

Early issues of the Companion were centered on religion, having been created, in the words of its first publishers Nathaniel Willis (father of Nathaniel Parker Willis) and Asa Rand, to encourage "virtue and piety, and ... warn against the ways of transgression". In its early years its circulation did not reach 5,000.

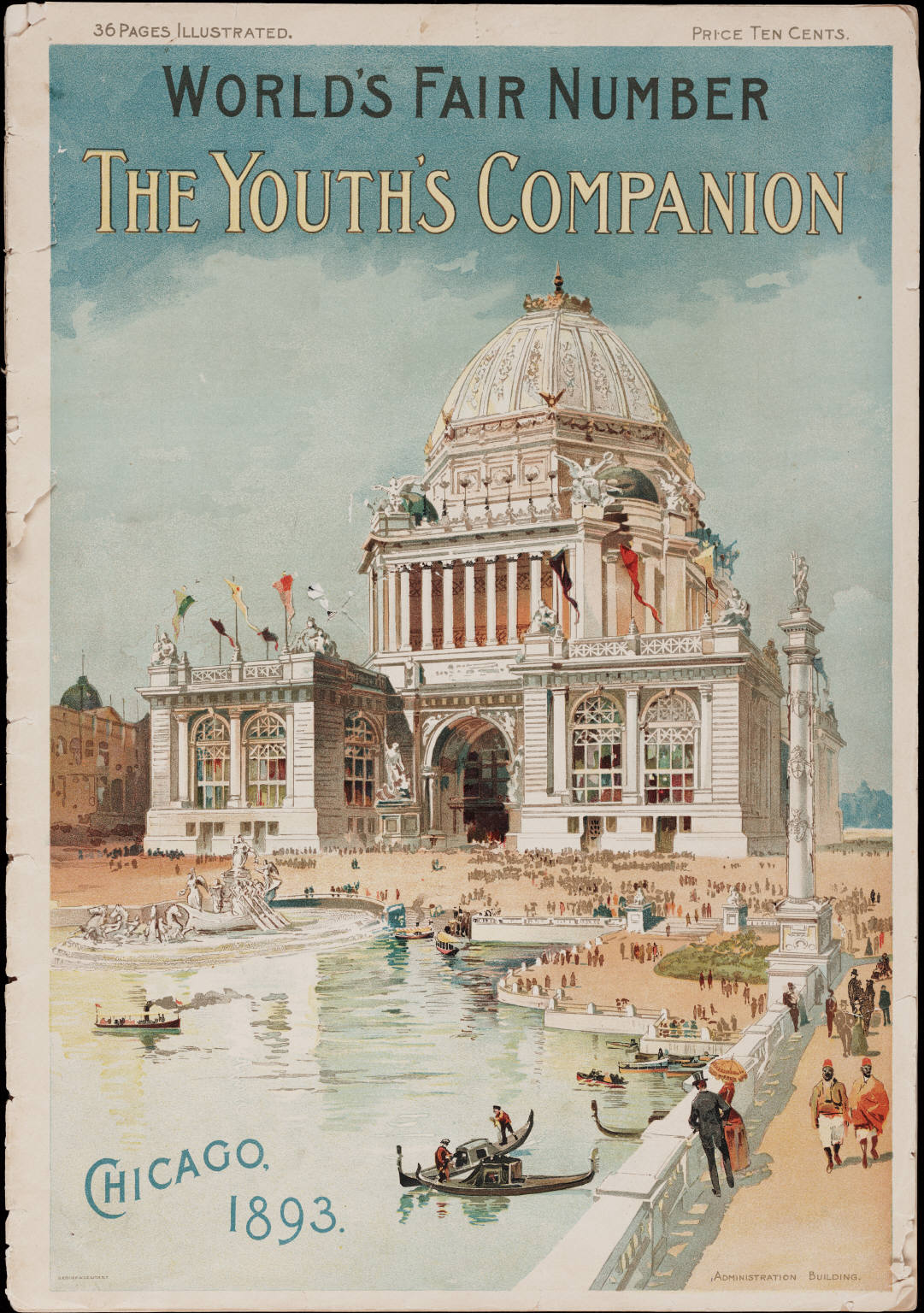
Youth's Companion, 1893

Through the years, publishers included Willis & Rand (Washington St., c. 1831); Olmstead & Co., (School St., c. 1857); and Perry Mason & Co. (Washington St., ca.1868; 41 Temple Place, c. 1873–1888; and Columbus Ave.; c. 1894).

In the 1890s its content was re-centered on entertainment, and it began to target adults as well as children with pieces contributed by writers such as Jane Addams, Harriet Beecher Stowe, Mark Twain, Emily Dickinson, Booker T. Washington, and Jack London. Another innovation was a medical column for older readers. In consequence, its circulation increased one-hundredfold, with sales peaking in 1893. It was advertised in 1897 as "an Illustrated Family Paper", having, as one person said of it, done "away with childish things". It did, however, retain a children's section, which included short poems and puzzles, and in faith to its beginnings did not mention nor advertise drugs or alcohol, nor did it delve much into politics; when it did, it usually did so in a humorous way.

On September 8, 1892, the magazine published the first copy of the Pledge of Allegiance, written by staff member Francis Bellamy.

From 1893 to 1907, Johnson Morton (Harvard 1886) served as an editor. In later years the magazine published articles from Willa Cather and Winston Churchill.

Erle Stanley Gardner (1889–1970) was, as a child, very fond of the magazine. When he embarked on his own writing career, Gardner borrowed the name "Perry Mason" for his famous fictional attorney-detective.

In 1929, The Youth's Companion merged with The American Boy.

In the 1947, movie Life with Father, which is set in the 1880s, the children of the family mention reading The Youth's Companion.
