= It Came Upon the Midnight Clear =

1849 literary work by Edmund Sears

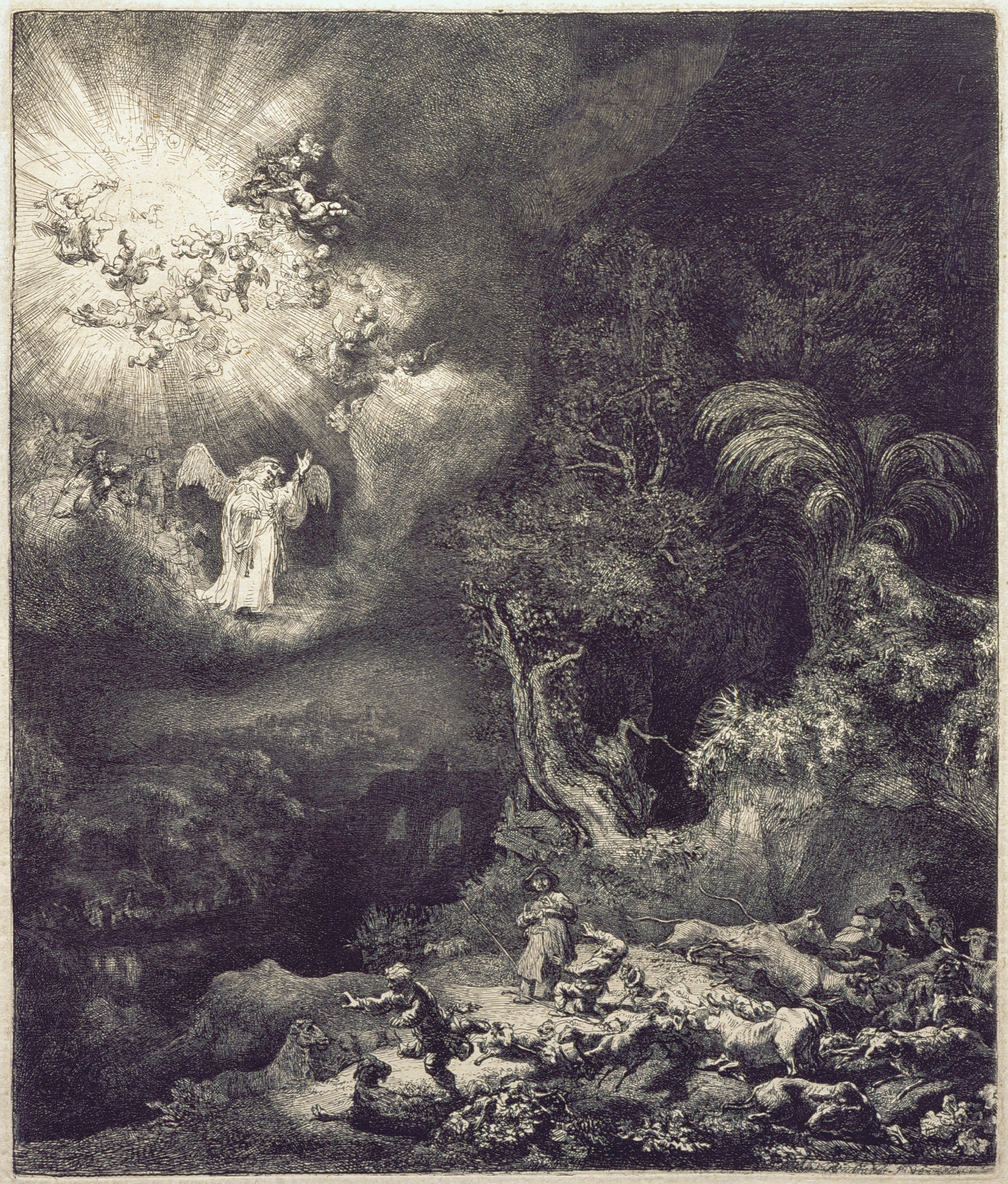
- The Angel Appearing to the Shepherds, 1634, by Rembrandt
- Genre: Christmas carol
- Written: 1849
- Text: Edmund Sears
- Based on: Luke 2:14
- Meter: 8.6.8.6 (CMD)
- Melody: "Carol", by Richard Storrs Willis, or "Noel", adapted by Arthur Sullivan

"It Came Upon the Midnight Clear", sometimes rendered as "It Came Upon a Midnight Clear", is an 1849 poem and Christmas carol written by Edmund Sears, pastor of the Unitarian Church in Wayland, Massachusetts. In 1850, Sears' lyrics were set to "Carol", a tune written for the poem the same year at his request, by Richard Storrs Willis. This pairing remains the most popular in the United States, while in Commonwealth countries, the lyrics are set to "Noel", a later adaptation by Arthur Sullivan from an English melody.

== History ==
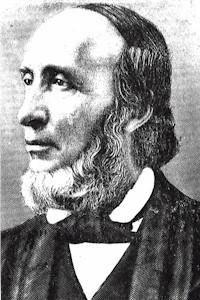
Edmund Sears

Edmund Sears composed the five-stanza poem in common metre doubled during 1849. It first appeared on December 29, 1849, in The Christian Register in Boston, Massachusetts.

Sears served the Unitarian congregation in Wayland, Massachusetts, before moving on to a larger congregation at First Church of Christ, Unitarian, in Lancaster, also known as The Bulfinch Church, for its design by Charles Bulfinch. After seven years, he suffered a breakdown and returned to Wayland. He wrote It Came Upon the Midnight Clear while serving as a part-time preacher in Wayland. Writing during a period of personal melancholy, and with news of revolution in Europe and the United States' war with Mexico fresh in his mind, Sears portrayed the world as dark, full of "sin and strife", and not hearing the Christmas message.

"It Came Upon the Midnight Clear"
Instrumental of the tune "Carol" – piano, violin, and English horn; variation in first phrase present (see above)

Sears is said to have written these words at the request of his friend, William Parsons Lunt, pastor of United First Parish Church, Quincy, Massachusetts, for Lunt's Sunday school. One account says the carol was first performed by parishioners gathered in Sears' home on Christmas Eve, but to what tune the carol was sung is unknown as Willis' familiar melody was not written until the following year.

According to Ken Sawyer, Sears' song is remarkable for its focus not on Bethlehem, but on his own time, and on the contemporary issue of war and peace. Written in 1849, it has long been assumed to be Sears' response to the just ended Mexican–American War. The song has been included in many of the Christmas albums recorded by numerous singers in the modern era.

== Melody ==
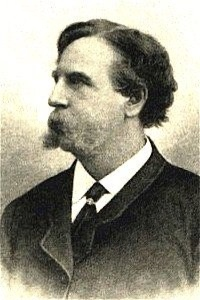
Richard Storrs Willis, composer of the tune common to the United States

In 1850, Richard Storrs Willis, a composer who trained under Felix Mendelssohn, published a "choir study" that was originally paired with other lyrics. This tune eventually came to be known as "Carol". Pairings of Sears' lyrics with Willis' tune had already begun to appear by 1880, and it is still the most widely associated tune with Sears' lyrics in the United States.

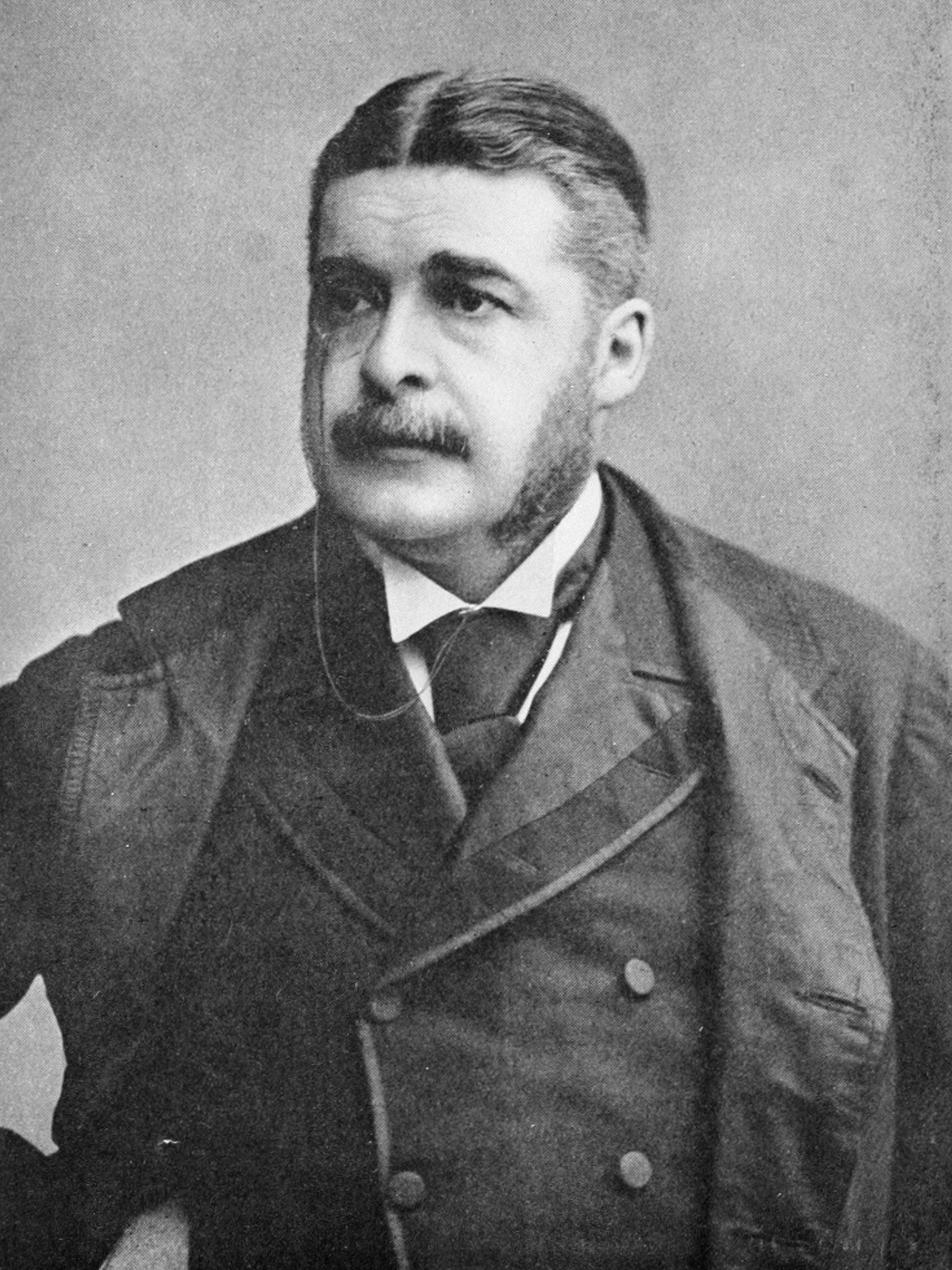
Sir Arthur Sullivan, composer of the tune common to Commonwealth countries

In Commonwealth countries, the tune called "Noel", which was adapted from an English melody in 1874 by Arthur Sullivan, is the usual accompaniment. This tune also appears as an alternative in The Hymnal 1982, the hymnal of the United States Episcopal Church.

== Lyrics ==
The full song comprises five stanzas. Some versions, including the United Methodist Hymnal and Lutheran Book of Worship, omit verse three, while others (including The Hymnal 1982) omit verse four. The 1985 hymnal of the Church of Jesus Christ of Latter-day Saints omits verses three and four. Several variations also exist to Sears' original lyrics.

It came upon the midnight clear,
That glorious song of old,
From angels bending near the earth
To touch their harps of gold;
"Peace on the earth, good will to men
From heaven's all-gracious King" –
The world in solemn stillness lay
To hear the angels sing.

Still through the cloven skies they come
With peaceful wings unfurled,
And still their heavenly music floats
O'er all the weary world;
Above its sad and lowly plains
They bend on hovering wing,
And ever o'er its Babel-sounds
The blessed angels sing.

But with the woes of sin and strife
The world has suffered long;
Beneath the angel-strain have rolled
Two thousand years of wrong;
And man, at war with man, hears not
The love-song which they bring; –
Oh hush the noise, ye men of strife,
And hear the angels sing!

And ye, beneath life's crushing load,
Whose forms are bending low,
Who toil along the climbing way
With painful steps and slow,
Look now! for glad and golden hours
Come swiftly on the wing; –
Oh, rest beside the weary road
And hear the angels sing!

For lo! the days are hastening on
By prophet bards foretold,
When with the ever circling years
Comes round the age of gold;
When Peace shall over all the earth
Its ancient splendors fling,
And the whole world give back the song
Which now the angels sing.

— Sears, Edmund H. (Edmund Hamilton), Sermons and Songs of Christian Life, pp. 17-18, Library of Congress and The Internet Archive.

== See also ==
- List of Christmas carols
