= Malhiot =

Malhiot is a surname. Notable people with the surname include:

- Charles-Christophe Malhiot (1808–1874), doctor and a member of the Senate of Canada from 1867 until his death
- François Malhiot (1733–1808), businessman and political figure in Lower Canada
- François-Xavier Malhiot (1781–1854), merchant, seigneur and political figure in Lower Canada
- Henri-Gédéon Malhiot (1840–1909), politician from Quebec, Canada
