= The Canadian Brothers =

1840 novel by John Richardson

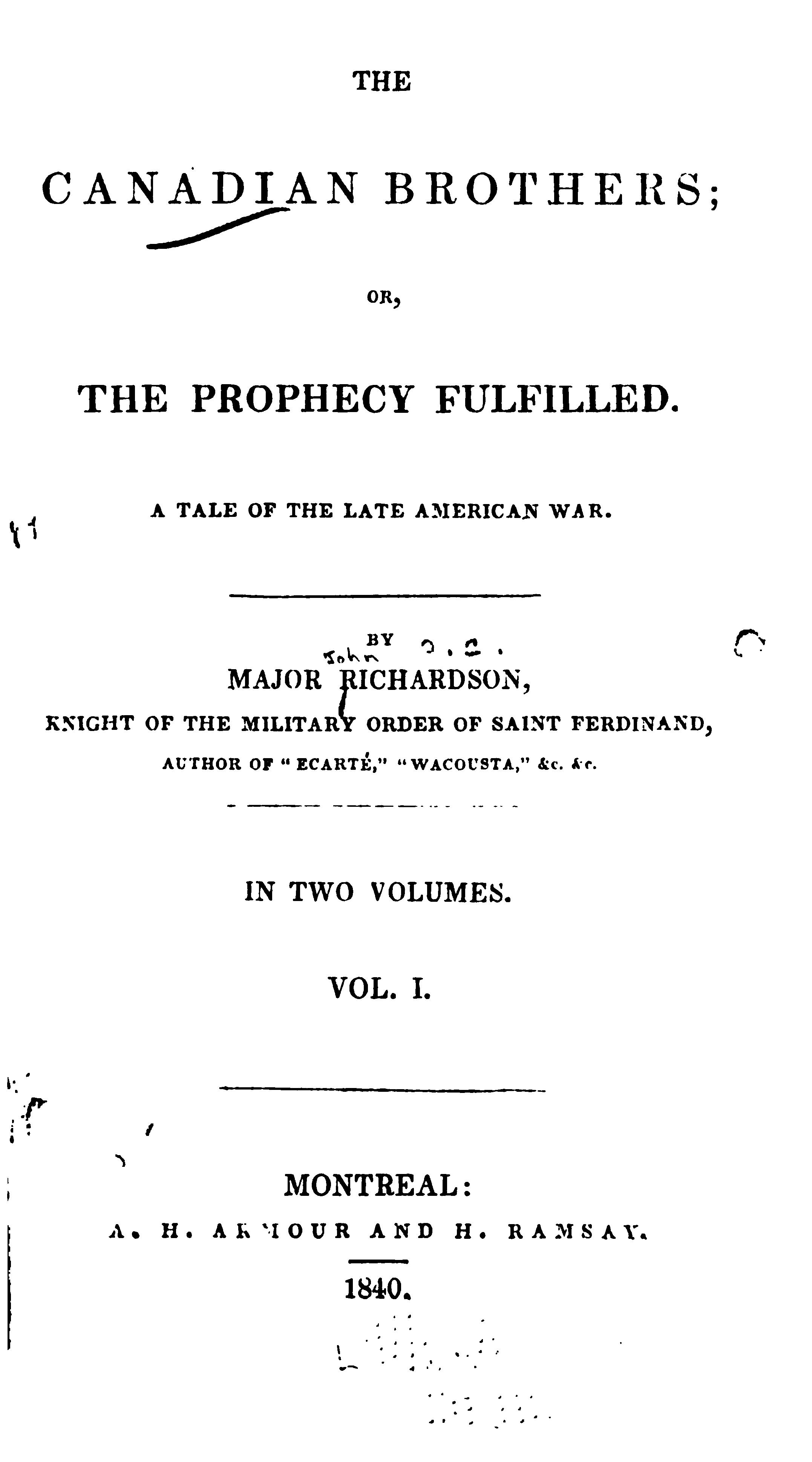
- First Canadian edition, 1840
- Author: John Richardson
- Language: English
- Publisher: A. H. Armour and H. Ramsay
- Publication date: 1840
- Publication place: Canada

The Canadian Brothers; or, The Prophecy Fulfilled: A Tale of the Late American War is a novel by John Richardson first published in 1840. A sequel to Richardson's 1832 novel Wacousta, Canadian Brothers concerns the titular brothers Gerald and Henry Grantham, two British army officers in the War of 1812, and Gerald's ill-fated romance with Matilda Montgomerie, an American who is revealed as the daughter of villain Jeremiah Desborough.

Canadian Brothers was written around the same time as Wacousta during a period of political upheaval in Canada. It was not a commercial success on its release. Critics agree that Canadian Brothers was influenced by the work of James Fenimore Cooper but divide on whether Richardson's novel endorses or rejects Cooper's views. Several scholars view the novel as an early document of Canadian nationalism in literature.

== Background ==
Canadian Brothers was published shortly after the rebellions in Lower Canada and Upper Canada. According to the historian Michael Witgen, Richardson supported the proposals of John Lambton, 1st Earl of Durham, for reforming the Canadian political system in response to the two rebellions. In documents including the Durham Report, Lord Durham suggested that The Canadas should be consolidated into a single province—which occurred in 1840–41—and favoured the assimilation of French Canadians into the newly unified British possession.

== Synopsis ==
Canadian Brothers is a sequel to Wacousta (1832). Wacousta is about the conflict between Colonel De Haldimar and Sir Reginald Morton, two officers of the British army who begin the novel as friends. De Haldimar makes off with Morton's fiancée and Morton, jilted, comes to Canada to avenge himself. On his arrival in North America, Morton reinvents himself as "Wacousta", an "Indian chief".

Wacousta takes place following Pontiac's War in 1763, while Canadian Brothers is set during the War of 1812, in and around Detroit and Lake Erie. It takes place about 50 years after Wacousta ends. The titular "prophecy" is Ellen Holloway's prediction in Wacousta that everyone in the De Haldimar family will die grisly deaths.

The novel's protagonists are Gerald and Henry Grantham, the Canadian brothers of the title, who are officers in the British army and supporters of the British Empire. The Granthams are descended from the De Haldimar family of Wacousta; they are grandchildren of Madeline and Frederick de Haldimar, cousins of Wacousta's Colonel Charles de Haldimar and Clara Beverley. Gerald and Henry meet Matilda Montgomerie, an American, with whom Gerald falls in love.

The novel's major villain is Jeremiah Desborough, a descendant of Wacousta and Matilda's father. Desborough is from Upper Canada but supports the American side in the war; he spies for the Americans around the Detroit River. Early in the novel, Desborough kills Major Grantham, Gerald and Henry's father. Other villains of Canadian Brothers include Americans eager to acquire more land.

Gerald follows Matilda to Kentucky, where she entices him to help her kill a man she once loved. The old beau left Matilda after he thought he saw her kissing a Black man; in fact, the supposed Black man was Desborough in a black mask, hugging his daughter. The old beau, in turn, is revealed to be an American officer with whom Gerald was acquainted in Detroit. Gerald refuses to kill the American ex-lover and eventually returns to Canada, where his brother Henry kills him by mistake in Queenston Heights. Desborough later kills Henry in battle, and Henry's friends kill Desborough.

== Composition and publication ==
Richardson may have started writing Canadian Brothers at the same time as Wacousta. According to the scholar Douglas Ivison, some of Canadian Brothers was written by summer 1838 and Richardson finished the novel while living in Sandwich, Ontario, in 1839. William F. E. Morley, relying on Richardson's preface to the first edition, states that the novel was completed entirely in England by February 1838 and that it was substantially finished by 1835. Morley notes that Richardson may have added some "finishing touches" while living in Sandwich. Portions of the novel were published in Literary Garland in spring 1839.

The first edition, released in two volumes, was published in 1840 in Montreal by A. H. Armour and H. Ramsay (likely Andrew Harvie Armour, Robert Armour's son, and Hew Ramsay) and printed by John Lovell. It was probably first printed in late 1839, since Richardson deposited the manuscript on 2 January 1840. Canadian Brothers was dedicated to John Harvey, who was then the lieutenant governor of New Brunswick. It was Richardson's only work of fiction to be published in Canada.

The novel did not succeed in Canada. Its first edition had 250 copies; despite a promotional campaign, less than 200 were sold, according to Richardson's 1847 memoir Eight Years in Canada. Richardson reworked Canadian Brothers under the new title Matilda Montgomerie while living in New York, deleting portions that could be seen as anti-American. The revised American edition was published in 1851.

== Reception ==
According to the critic Douglas Ivison, Canadian Brothers embodies an attitude towards imperialism which is different from that in Wacousta. Ivison argues that, although Canadian Brothers concerns the same family as Wacousta, it adopts either a nationalist or postcolonial perspective on Canada, as opposed to Wacousta's imperialist view.

Donald Graham Stephens, who edited a critical edition of the novel, describes it as a "fictionalized chronicle of actual events, people and places from Richardson's childhood and adolescence". Several characters from history, including Tecumseh, Isaac Brock, and Robert Heriot Barclay, appear in the narrative.

Historian Michael Witgen argues that Richardson, in Canadian Brothers, opposed James Fenimore Cooper's view of American nationhood. Canadian Brothers, on Witgen's interpretation, endorses a negative view of Americans as rebellious and power-hungry expansionists who disregard the interests of Indigenous people and the British Empire. Witgen describes the novel as gothic. Carole Gerson, a literary scholar, agrees: she argues that Canadian Brothers "continues the transformation of history into gothic romance initiated in Wacousta".

Dennis Duffy, a literary critic, argues that Canadian Brothers reflects the influence of American writing and the American book market, especially Cooper's The Last of the Mohicans. One aspect of this influence, according to Duffy, is that Indigenous characters in Canadian Brothers are treated dismissively or cast as villains. Duffy describes Wacousta and Canadian Brothers as "something of a family saga" of "three generations".

The critic Ray Palmer Baker considered Canadian Brothers "significant", noting that it was an "early attempt to give expression to the spirit of nationality". Literary scholar Michael Hurley argues that the two families—Wacousta's, represented by Desborough; and the De Haldimars, represented by the eponymous brothers—stand in for Americans and Canadians, respectively.

American studies scholar Oana Godeanu-Kenworthy views the Canadian Brothers as proof of the existence of two competing Anglo-American Exceptionalisms in nineteenth-century North America, one rooted in the imperial model, the other in American nationalism. She argues that in this novel, Richardson narrativizes the British imperial policies and alliances with the Natives in the War of 1812 as a way of asserting Canada's difference from (and superiority to) the United States; from this point of view, race policies function in the Canadian Brothers as a litmus test of imperial civility.

James Reaney adapted Canadian Brothers into a play which was produced at the University of Calgary in 1983.

== Works cited ==
- Baker, Ray Palmer (1920). A History of English-Canadian Literature to the Confederation: Its Relation to the Literature of Great Britain and the United States. Harvard University Press. ISBN 978-0-674-18872-3. OCLC 1046578640.
- Duffy, Dennis (1996). A World under Sentence: John Richardson and the Interior. ECW Press. ISBN 1-55022-250-3. OCLC 35301069.
- Gerson, Carole (1989). A Purer Taste: The Writing and Reading of Fiction in English in Nineteenth-Century Canada. University of Toronto Press. ISBN 0-8020-5820-5. OCLC 23902062.
- Godeanu-Kenworthy, Oana (2018). "Fictions of Race: American Indian Policies in Nineteenth-Century British North American Fiction". Journal of American Studies. 52: 91–113. doi:10.1017/S0021875816001948. S2CID 152100608.
- Godeanu-Kenworthy, Oana (2014). "Creole Frontiers: Imperial Ambiguities in John Richardson's and James Fenimore Cooper's Fiction". Early American Literature. 49 (3): 741–770. ISSN 0012-8163. JSTOR 24476643.
- Hurley, Michael (1992). The Borders of Nightmare: The Fiction of John Richardson. Toronto: University of Toronto Press. ISBN 978-1-4875-9977-5. OCLC 692615454.
- Ivison, Douglas (2003). "'I too am a Canadian': John Richardson's The Canadian Brothers as Postcolonial Narrative". In Moss, Laura F. E. (ed.). Is Canada Postcolonial?: Unsettling Canadian Literature. Wilfrid Laurier University Press. pp. 162–176. ISBN 978-0-88920-673-1. OCLC 180704539.
- MacDonald, Mary Lu (1992). Literature and Society in the Canadas, 1817–1850. Edwin Mellen Press. ISBN 0-7734-9524-X. OCLC 25871591.
- Morley, William F. E (1973). A Bibliographical Study of Major John Richardson. Toronto: Bibliographical Society of Canada. OCLC 1147715747.
- Stephens, Donald G., ed. (1992). The Canadian Brothers. Carleton University Press. ISBN 978-0-7735-7377-2. OCLC 191818994.
- New, William H. (2003). A History of Canadian Literature (2d ed.). McGill–Queen's University Press. ISBN 978-0-7735-7136-5. OCLC 243613827.
- Witgen, Michael (2012). An Infinity of Nations: How the Native New World Shaped Early North America. University of Pennsylvania Press. doi:10.9783/9780812205176. ISBN 978-0-8122-4365-9.
- Godeanu-Kenworthy, Oana (2022). Between Empire and Republic: America in the Colonial Canadian Imagination. Lexington Books. pp. xi–xxxii. ISBN 978-1-7936-3552-5.
