= Literary Garland =

Canadian literary magazine

Literary Garland was a Montreal-based literary magazine published by John Lovell and John Gibson. During its run from 1838 to 1851, it was the most successful literary magazine in Canada, and started the careers of many prominent Canadian literary authors and composers.

== History ==
Literary Garland was started in December 1838 by John Lovell, a Montreal-based publisher who came to Quebec from Ireland in 1820 and made a reputation publishing school texts, directories, and gazetteers. His brother-in-law John Gibson served as editor from 1838 to 1842 and co-publisher from 1842 until the magazine's dissolution in 1851. The stated aim of the magazine was to make it a "vehicle of Canadian literary expression." It was the first magazine in Canada to pay its contributors, allowing many early female authors to receive compensation for their work for the first time.

The magazine initially sought to publish poetry, book reviews, essays, prose, fiction, jokes, art news, anecdotes, household hints, recipes, and music scores that would appeal to a wide range of readers. Over time, it switched to essays on linguistics, dramatic sketches with Biblical themes, Victorian gift-book style poetry, and formulaic romantic-styled historical fiction, following a genteel, traditional, and moralistic bent which appealed to a smaller number of readers. It has been described as providing for its readers "a polite, effeminate world where blushing maidens, sentimentality, class snobbery, and religious propriety ruled supreme."

John Gibson died in 1850. His role as editor for Literary Garland was filled by Eliza Lanesford Cushing, who was an important contributor in poetry and prose fiction, as well as dramatic plays and sketches that were integral to the beginning of play-writing as an art in English Canada.

The editors were selective of pieces they allowed in, and many would-be contributors published in other magazines due to differences in cultural values. Between the lack of subscribers, lack of contributors, and foreign competition from American magazines, the Literary Garland published Vol. 9 no. 12, its final, in 1851.

During its run, the Literary Garland was the most successful Canadian literary magazine.

== Contributors ==
Susanna Moodie was a regular contributor to the magazine, with six sketches that appeared in her work Roughing it in the Bush first appearing in Literary Garland in 1847. Her talents as a writer were first recognized by John Lovell, who had her works published in Literary Garland alongside musical works by her husband J. W. Dunbar Moodie.

Rosanna Eleanor Leprophon's first literary work was a poem published by Literary Garland when she was seventeen years old.

Charles Sangster, one of the most notable pre-Confederation Canadian poets, achieved national recognition in 1850 following the publishing of his poetry in Literary Garland.

The earliest published sheet music in English Canada, "The Merry Bells of England" by Bytown (present-day Ottawa) choirmaster J. F. Lehmann, was published in Literary Garland in 1840. Many other early Canadian composers and songwriters had their sheet music published, including Joseph Maffré, W. H. Warren, and Charles Sauvageau. Lovell was the only publisher in the time period to concentrate on Canadian musical content.

Harriet Vaughan Cheney, founder of Canada's first children's magazine and Eliza Lanesford Cushing's sister, was a staple contributor to Literary Garland.

Parts of The Canadian Brothers by John Richardson first appeared in Literary Garland.

Joanna Belfrage Picken published poems in Literary Garland and other Montreal magazines.

== See also ==
- List of literary magazines
