= Shawinigan (disambiguation) =

Shawinigan is a city located on the Saint-Maurice River in the Mauricie area in Quebec, Canada.

Shawinigan may also refer to:

== Places ==
- Shawinigan River, a tributary of the Saint-Maurice River, Quebec, Canada
- Shawinigan (Province of Canada), a former electoral division of the Province of Canada from 1854 to 1867 for the Mauricie area in Quebec
- Division of Shawinigan (Legislative Council), a former electoral division of the Legislative Council of Quebec from 1867 to 1968

== Other uses ==
- Collège Shawinigan, a junior college in Shawinigan, Quebec, Canada
- HMCS Shawinigan (K136), a Flower class corvette that served in the Royal Canadian Navy and was lost during the Battle of the Atlantic in World War II
- HMCS Shawinigan (MM 704), a Kingston class patrol vessel in the Canadian Forces, commissioned in 1997

== See also ==
- Shawinigan Handshake, an epithet given to a chokehold executed in 1996 by Jean Chrétien, then Prime Minister of Canada, on an anti-poverty protester
- Shawinigan Water & Power Company, a former hydroelectric companies in Canada, now part of Hydro-Québec
- Shawnigan Lake, British Columbia, a village on Vancouver Island
