= The Humming Bird, or Herald of Taste =

First American women's magazine edited by a woman

- Format: Quarto
- Publisher: Lazarus Beach
- First issue: 1798
- Country: United States
- Based in: Newfield, CT

The Humming Bird, or Herald of Taste was an American women's magazine published in 1798. It is the first known magazine in the United States edited by a woman, for women.

== Publication history ==
The Humming Bird was published in Newfield, Connecticut, in an area now known as Bridgeport. Its audience was primarily the women of this rural area, and it is an important example of how rural American print culture evolved in the late 18th century. In the history of American women's magazines, this places The Humming Bird as a rural counterpart to other women-edited periodicals of the era such as the Boston Weekly Magazine (est. 1802) and the Baltimore-based The Observer, founded by Eliza Anderson Godefrey in 1806. While the editor's identity has been questioned, it is generally accepted that her claim to female identity is legitimate.

The anonymous editor of The Humming Bird is speculated to have been Polly (Thompson) Hall, wife of the magazine's printer, Lazarus Beach. Beach had established himself as a printer in Connecticut as early as 1764 and later printed material by other notable female writers, including Susanna Rowson.

Only three issues of The Humming Bird exist today, each as a single copy. These are:

- Vol. 1 No 1, April 14, 1798
- Vol. 1 No. 5, June 9, 1798
- Vol 1. No. 7, July 13, 1798,

These copies are in the collections of the American Antiquarian Society. They were printed as quartos.

== Contents ==
In contrast to other magazines at the time that offered opportunities for women to be published in male-edited periodicals, The Humming Bird provides an example of content decisions dictated by a female editor. The editor solicited contributions from readers and reprinted material from other periodicals (as was common practice at the time), but likely also wrote some of the contributions herself. According to the three remaining issues of the magazine, contents generally included weather reports, marriage announcements, poetry, serialized fiction, history, essays, and travel literature.

Noted articles include "The Contrast," in the first issue, authored by the editor herself to illustrated how industrious women might find time to manage their household while also writing material for the magazine and earning money to purchase copies; and a poem titled "The Coquette" which borrows heavily from the novel of the same name by author Hannah Webster Foster.
