= Eliza Anderson Godefroy =

Eliza Anderson Godefroy (pen name, Beatrice Ironside) is believed to be the first woman to edit a general-interest magazine in the United States. At age 26, from 1806 to 1807, she served as the founder and editor of a Baltimore publication called The Observer.

== Early years. ==
Eliza Anderson was the daughter of Baltimore physician Dr. John Crawford.

== Personal life ==
In 1799, at 19, Eliza married local merchant Henry Anderson. Their time together would be short as Anderson abandoned Eliza and their infant daughter by 1801. In 1805, Anderson accompanied her friend and fellow Baltimorean Elizabeth Patterson Bonaparte on a journey to Europe in a vain attempt to convince Napoleon Bonaparte to recognize her marriage to his youngest brother, Jérôme-Napoléon Bonaparte.

== Career ==
After Anderson returned to Baltimore in November 1805, she joined The Companion and Weekly Miscellany, which was in circulation from November 1804 to October 1806. In September 1806, Anderson became the editor. It is unclear what her exact contributions to the publication were because pseudonyms were commonly used. Shortly thereafter, she decided to close The Companion and start a new magazine, The Observer, that would cover a broader range of subjects and adopt a more satirical tone.

Initially, the editor's gender was hidden from the public. However, after a few weeks, Anderson adopted the pen name "Beatrice Ironside" for her editorials. Anderson addressed the matter of her gender head-on, acknowledging that "much curiosity had been excited to know, what manner of woman our female editor may be" and introduced herself to her readership.

While a few widows had taken on the role of editing or publishing newspapers after the death of their husbands, the idea of a female editor was novel in 1807. Secondary sources on the history of women editors overlooked Anderson, identifying the first woman to edit a magazine as Mary Clarke Carr, who published the Intellectual Regale, or Ladies Tea Tray, in Philadelphia beginning in 1814—seven years after Anderson began publishing The Observer, and 16 years after an anonymous female editor published The Humming Bird, or Herald of Taste. Moreover, Carr's magazine, like almost all magazines edited by women in the 19th century, was aimed at a female audience, while Anderson's publication was directed at both men and women.

Almost immediately, Anderson became embroiled in what the first of a number of journalistic vendettas: her featured columnist, "Benjamin Bickerstaff," quit in a huff after Anderson made some sarcastic remarks about young Baltimore ladies and what Anderson perceived to be their affectations. Later in 1807, Anderson's sarcasm about the state of the arts and culture in Baltimore, which she found sadly lacking, brought accusations that she was elitist and unpatriotic. Further criticism and outrage came her way when, in the fall of 1807, Anderson's translation of a scandalous French novel, Claire d'Albe by Sophie Cottin, was published.

By the end of 1807, following a number of attacks and weary of coping with subscribers who balked at paying their bills, Anderson decided to closed The Observer. She identified her gender as the primary source of the animosity against her. In one of the magazine's final issues, Anderson wrote, "It was a Woman who was [The Observer's] editor, this was all that was necessary to render its enemies BRAVE, and this was enough to embolden the most pusillanimous Wight to assume the garb of the Lion." While there were certainly other reasons for the hostility Anderson encountered—her merciless satire, and the fact that her translation of Claire d'Albe offended contemporary standards of decency—it appears that the feeling against her was intensified by her gender.

== Personal life ==
In 1808, Anderson married French architect Maximilian Godefroy, who designed several notable buildings in Baltimore. Over the years, Godefroy found it difficult to support himself in Baltimore, and in 1819 the family embarked for Europe. Shortly after they sailed, Mrs. Godefroy's 19-year-old daughter from her first marriage, also named Eliza, was taken ill with yellow fever aboard the ship and died. Eventually, the Godefroys traveled to England and then to France, where Godefroy made a modest living as a government architect. Eliza Anderson Godefroy died in Laval, France, on October 2, 1839, at the age of fifty-nine.
