= The Boarding School =

The Boarding School may refer to:

- The Boarding School; or, Lessons of a Preceptress to Her Pupils, 1798 American novel
- The Boarding School (film), 1969 Spanish psychological suspense/horror film

== See also ==
- Boarding School (disambiguation)
- Boarding school, educational institution
