= Harriet Vaughan Cheney =

American-Canadian novelist (1796–1889)

- Born: September 9, 1796; Brighton, Massachusetts
- Died: May 14, 1889 (aged 92)
- Occupation: Novelist
- Spouse: Edward Cheney
- Relatives: Hannah Webster Foster (mother); Eliza Lanesford Cushing (sister)
- Writing career
- Genre: Historical Romances

Harriet Vaughan Cheney (September 9, 1796 – May 14, 1889) was an American-Canadian novelist. She wrote a number of historical romances, among them A Peep at the Pilgrims in Sixteen Thirty-Six and The Rivals of Acadia, as well as religious works for children.

== Biography ==
Harriet Vaughan Cheney was born in Brighton, Massachusetts, September 9, 1796. Her father was John Foster, a Unitarian clergyman. Her mother, Hannah Webster Foster, and her sister, Eliza Lanesford Cushing, were also both writers.

Cheney published her first works in Boston. In 1830, she married Canadian merchant Edward Cheney, with whom she would have four children, and moved to Montreal, where she would spend the rest of her life. Her sister Eliza had also married a Canadian and moved to Montreal, and the two regularly contributed stories and poems to Literary Garland, Canada's foremost literary magazine of the time. Cheney continued to publish her longer works in Boston. After the deaths of their husbands in 1845 and 1846, the two sisters founded the Snow-Drop, a monthly girls' magazine "primarily concerned with social roles and domestic responsibilities appropriate for young women." Cheney died in 1889.

== Selected works ==
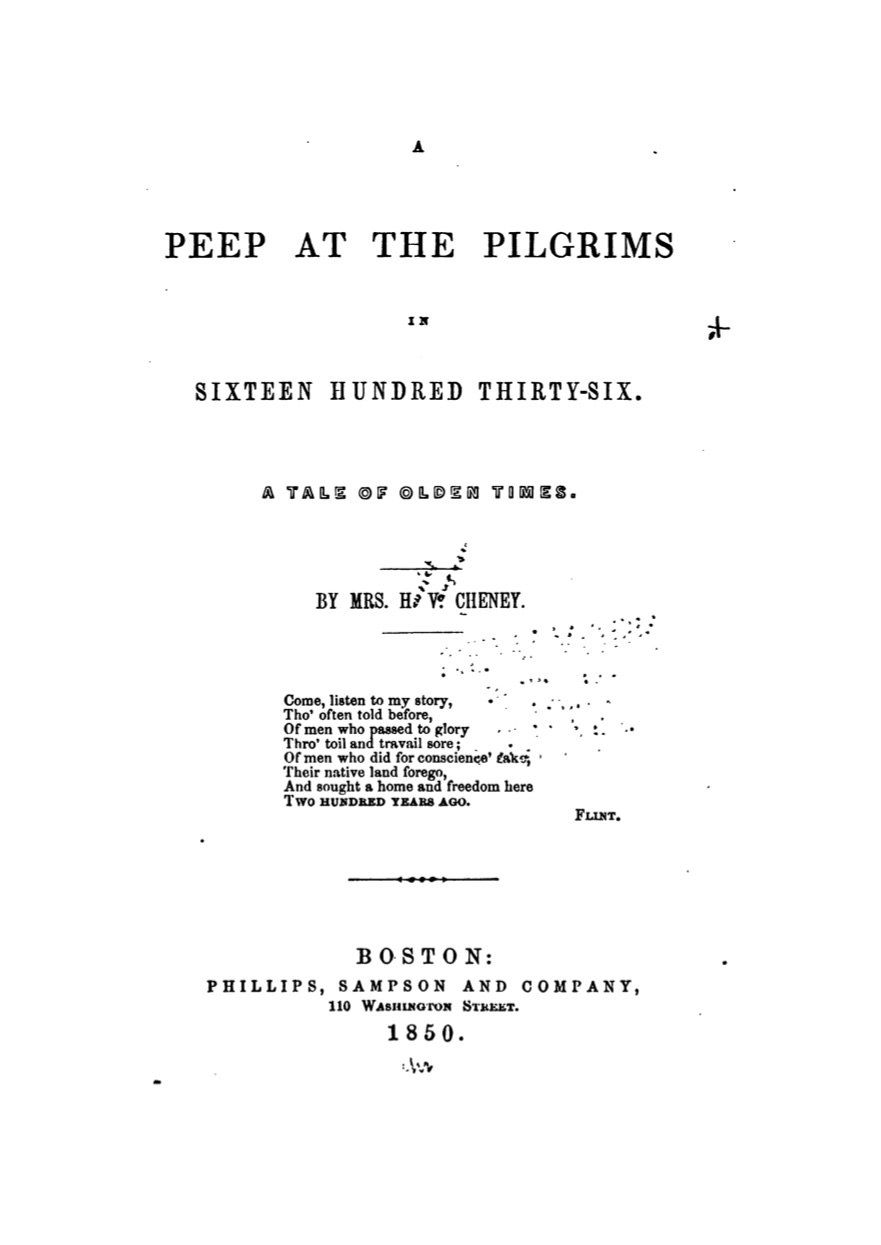
Title page of 1850 edition of A Peep at the Pilgrims in Sixteen Hundred Thirty Six: A Tale of Olden Times.

- The Sunday-School, or Village Sketches (1820, with Eliza Cushing)
- A Peep at the Pilgrims in Sixteen Thirty-Six: A Tale of Olden Times (1824, anonymous)
- The Rivals of Acadia: an Old Story of the New World (1827, anonymous)
- Sketches from the Life of Christ (1844)
- Confessions of an Early Martyr (1846)
- The Snow-Drop (periodical, 1847–52, with Eliza Cushing)
- Stories for The Literary Garland:

- "Jacques Cartier and the Little Indian Girl" (1848)
- "The Emigrants" (1850)
- "Cousin Emma" (1850)
- "A Legend of the Lake" (1851)
- "The Old Manuscript: A Memoire of the Past" (1851)

- "Early Authorship" (essay for the Garland, 1850)
