= The Coquette =

1797 novel by Hannah Webster Foster

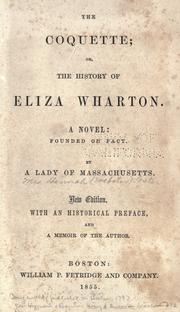
- 1855 printing of the novel
- Author: Hannah Webster Foster
- Original title: The Coquette; or, The History of Eliza Wharton
- Language: English
- Genre: Epistolary novel
- Publication date: 1797
- Publication place: United States
- Media type: Print

The Coquette or, The History of Eliza Wharton is an epistolary novel by Hannah Webster Foster. It was published anonymously in 1797, and did not appear under the author's real name until 1856, 16 years after Foster's death. It was one of the best-selling novels of its time and was reprinted eight times between 1824 and 1828. A fictionalized account of the much-publicized death of a socially elite Connecticut woman after giving birth to a stillborn, illegitimate child at a roadside tavern, Foster's novel highlights the social conditions that lead to the downfall of an otherwise well-educated and socially adept woman.

== List of characters ==
- Eliza Wharton— the protagonist of the novel who, following the death of her fiancé is pursued by two men: Reverend J. Boyer and Major Peter Sanford. Her free spirit and lack of commitment to the male sex bestow her the term "coquette." Her coquettish nature eventually leads to her demise.
- Rev. J. Boyer — the first of Eliza's suitors. He is a safe and modest man who wishes to have Eliza's hand in marriage, yet his predictable nature is not appealing enough. Ultimately, Eliza's lack of sincerity and commitment causes him to end his pursuit of her.
- Major Peter Sanford — the second of Eliza's suitors. He is a womanizer who provides excitement for Eliza yet shows no signs of future commitment. However, he eventually marries another woman; this does not prevent Eliza from further continuing her relationship with him.
- Lucy Freeman — Eliza's best friend, from whom she often seeks advice. Lucy's disapproval of Eliza's decisions is evident in her letters. During the novel, she gets married; thus, her name is changed to Lucy Sumner.
- Charles Deighton-Sanford's primary confidant. Sanford expresses his thoughts in his letters to Charles.
- Mr. T. Selby — Reverend Boyer's primary confidant. He expresses his blatant disapproval of Eliza in his responses.
- Nancy Sanford— Major Peter Sanford's wife. Although not as attractive as Eliza, her wealth compensates. She is briefly mentioned in Major Sanford's letters.
- Gen. and Mrs. Richman — Relatives of Eliza (Mrs. Richman is Eliza's cousin). The couple provides her with a place to stay upon the loss of her fiancé. While they truly look out for her best interests, their advice is often overlooked.
- Julia Granby — a free-spirit and one of Eliza's closest friends. She comes to comfort Eliza during her time of despair.
- Mrs. Wharton — Eliza's widowed mother. Coping with the loss of her husband, she is happy when Eliza returns home but distressed to see her in such a disdainful state.

== Plot summary ==
The story is about Eliza Wharton, the daughter of a clergyman. At the beginning of the novel she has just been released from an unwanted marriage by the death of her betrothed, the Rev. Haly, also a clergyman, whom Eliza nursed during his final days in her own home. After this experience, she decides she wants friendship and independence. After a short period of time living with friends, she is courted by two men. One, Boyer, is a respected but rather boring clergyman, whom all of her friends and her mother recommend she accept in marriage. The other, Sanford, is an aristocratic libertine, who has no intention to marry but determines not to let another man have Eliza. Because of her indecision and her apparent preference for the libertine Sanford, Boyer eventually gives up on her, deciding that she will not make a suitable wife. Sanford also disappears from her life and marries another woman, Nancy, for her fortune. Eliza eventually decides that she really loved Boyer and wants him back. Unfortunately for Eliza, Boyer has already decided to marry Maria Selby, a relation of Boyer's friend. Sanford later reappears married, but is able to seduce the depressed Eliza. They have a hidden affair for some time until, overcome by guilt and unwilling to face her family and friends, Eliza arranges to escape from her home. Like the real-life Elizabeth Whitman, she dies due to childbirth complications and is buried by strangers. Mrs. Wharton (Eliza's mother) and all of Eliza's friends are deeply saddened by her death. Sanford, too, is devastated by her death. In a letter to his friend, Charles Deighton, he expresses his regret at his wretched behavior.

== Genre and narrative form ==
Together, The Coquette and Charlotte Temple by Susanna Rowson (1791) have been called "the canonical representations of seduction novels by women".

Written in epistolary form, this novel allows the reader to directly engage with the events central to the plot by entering the minds of the characters. The letters serve as windows into the thoughts of the writers, creating an intimate connection. The reader also benefits from an unbiased perspective, since it is the culmination of different character's input that creates the story. The epistolary form is also an intriguing way to captivate an audience. Reading letters addressed to others has a feeling akin to eavesdropping; it exposes thoughts otherwise not publicly known.

== Sources ==
Foster's tale was loosely based on the biography of Elizabeth Whitman (1752–88), whose death at 37 in a roadside tavern after giving birth to a stillborn child was widely publicized in the New England papers nine years before the novel's publication. Like her fictional counterpart, Whitman was accomplished, vivacious, and widely admired. She is known to have been engaged to the Rev. Joseph Howe (prototype for Foster's Rev. Hale), and then later to the Rev. Joseph Buckminster (fictionalized as Rev. Boyer), but she married neither. Whitman attracted the attention of the poet Joel Barlow (1754–1812), who wrote flirtatious letters to Whitman while also courting another woman, Ruth Baldwin, whom he eventually married.

Whitman, under the name "Mrs. Walker," died at the Bell Tavern in Danvers, Massachusetts, after giving birth to a stillborn baby. Biographers are still not certain of the identity of her lover, who is referred to only as "Fidelio" in her letters. Her death notices, published in a variety of New England newspapers in 1788, quickly provoked moral lectures for young women. Whitman's life was turned into a moral allegory, ministers and journalists blaming her demise on her reading of romance novels, which gave her improper ideas and turned her into a coquette. Foster responded with The Coquette, which offered a more sympathetic portrayal of Whitman and the restrictions placed on middle-class women in early American society.

The title page to The Coquette announces the tale as "A Novel Founded on Fact," testifying both to the novel's basis on newspaper accounts of Whitman's death, as well as the prevailing suspicion of novelistic fiction in the early Republic as potentially corrupting, especially to the female mind. However, the novel can be argued to dignify Elizabeth's character by playing down the sensationalism of the many newspaper accounts of her death, which Cathy N. Davidson has argued were "the stuff of good rumor, of gossip, of sentimental novels."

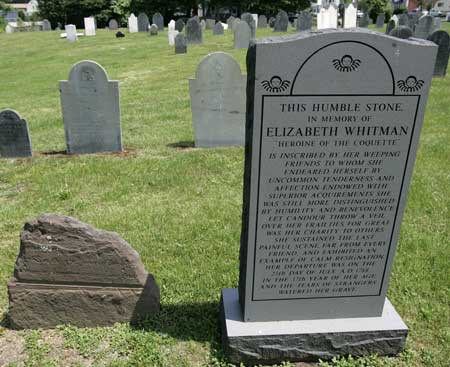
Elizabeth Whitman's grave

Elizabeth Whitman's grave, after her widely publicized death, became a tourist attraction in Peabody, Massachusetts where it still remains. The original tombstone has been chipped away by tourists seeking souvenirs. To the right of the remnants of this stone is a replication of the tombstone described in Foster's novel on which the inscription reads:

This humble stone, in memory of ELIZABETH WHITMAN,
Is inscribed by her weeping friends,
To whom she endeared herself
By uncommon tenderness and affection.
Endowed with superior genius and accomplishments,
She was still more distinguished by humility and benevolence.
Let Candour throw a veil over her frailties,
For great was her charity to others.
She lived an example of calm resignation,
And sustained the last painful scene,
Far from every friend.
Her departure was on the 25th of July, A.D. 1788.
In the 37th year of her age;
The tears of strangers watered her grave.

The new tombstone was erected in attempts to revive the community's interest in the tale of Elizabeth Whitman and Foster's novel. It is now included on the Literacy Trail of Massachusetts. With the growing popularity of Foster's novel, the true Elizabeth Whitman and the fictional Eliza Wharton became melded into one and are barely differentiable by most readers today.

== Interpretation and criticism ==
The Coquette received a revival of critical attention during the late twentieth century. It is often praised for its intelligent portrayal of the contrast between individualism vs. social conformity and passion vs. reason. It has also been studied for its relationship to political ideologies of the early American republic and its portrayal of the emerging middle class.

Foster's tale has been read on the one hand as a "novel for providing a subversive message about the ways in which the lives of women even of the elite are subject to narrow cultural constraints" and, on the other hand, as an instructive novel that "comes down on the side of the ideology of Republican motherhood and the women's sphere, a sphere that celebrated those women who with appropriate sentiment and rationality accepted their "place" in the world. Foster's epistolary narrative allows for the development of multiple points of view and for a variety of readings. Rather than being presented as a one-sided coquette, the development of Eliza's character through her letter writing allows for a reading of Eliza as both "victim" and "transgressor" of society's norms.

Cathy N. Davidson argues that The Coquette is not merely a novel about the evils of sin and seduction, but rather "a remarkably detailed assessment of the marital possibilities facing late-eighteenth-century women of the middle or upper-middle classes." Davidson notes the centrality of Foster's novel in "countering received ideas on women's circumscribed power and authority," positioning The Coquette as "an important voice in the debate on women's role in the Republic." In her exploration of the early American novel, Davidson uses the contradictions between Foster's novel and the moral accounts of Elizabeth Whitman's death to explore the emergence of the early American sentimental novel:

Eliza Wharton sins and dies. Her death can convey the conservative moral that many critics of the time demanded. Yet the circumstances of that death seem designed to tease the reader into thought. It is in precisely these interstices—the distjunctions between the conventional and the radical readings of the plot – that the early American sentimental novel flourishes. It is in the irresolution of Eliza Wharton's dilemma that the novel, as a genre, differentiates itself from the tract stories of Elizabeth Whitman in which the novel is grounded and which it ultimately transcends.

In Redefining the Political Novel, Sharon M. Harris responds to Cathy Davidson's work by arguing that The Coquette can be understood as a political novel; she writes, "By recognizing and satirizing, first, the political systems that create women's social realisms and, second, the language used to convey those systems to the broader culture, Foster exposes the sexist bases of the new nation's political ideologies."

Countering Davidson and Harris, Thomas Joudrey has argued that the novel fortifies obedience to a patriarchal conception of marriage. In its sustained denigration of fancy and passion, The Coquette "deprives the imagined readers not merely of actualized resistance but also of the very mental capacities that perceive injury and formulate alternatives to their oppression."

One aspect of The Coquette that has garnered significant critical attention is the role of female friendship within the text. In Perfecting Friendship: Politics and Affiliation in Early American Literature, Ivy Schweitzer discusses the "affective failures" of Eliza Wharton's female friends and argues that while Eliza can be understood as "the champion of an inclusive, even feminist 'civic republicanism,'" her friends belong to "the female 'chorus' [that] presages the more rigid separation of the sexes and women's exile from the social to the domestic sphere ushered in by liberalism." Claire C. Pettengill reads female friendship within The Coquette in terms of sisterhood, which she argues "[involved] a kind of support network that helped a woman establish her identity in opposition to both social and parental authority in an era where both were increasingly challenged." At the same time, Pettengill insists that the "emotional-disciplinary circuit that reinforces sisterhood is not operating at full (theoretical) capacity." That is, even though Eliza discusses her life with her friends, they do not fully reciprocate; instead, they respond primarily by criticizing her actions and warning her against further wrongdoing. Pettengill ultimately arrives at the conclusion that "The novel's bifurcated view of sisterhood, then, reveals some of the ways in which the new nation's uneasiness over changing economic and social relations, in particular the tension between individual and group interests, spelled itself out in terms of the function of women."

Other critical studies of The Coquette include Dorothy Z. Baker's work, which argues that "Eliza's struggle to control her life begins with the struggle to control language, the language of society that dictates her identity and conscribes her life." Additionally, C. Leiren Mower makes the case that Eliza "reworks Lockean theories of labor and ownership as a means of authorizing proprietary control over her body's commerce in the social marketplace. Instead of accepting her social and legal status as another's personal property, Eliza publicly performs her dissent as visible evidence of the legitimacy of her proprietary claims."

In 1798, Foster published her second novel, The Boarding School, which was never reprinted and not nearly as popular as The Coquette.

== Adaptations ==
A poem titled The Coquette, borrowing heavily from Webster Foster's work, was printed in 1798 in The Humming Bird, the first known magazine published by a woman editor in the United States.
