= Joanna Belfrage Picken =

Scottish-Canadian poet and satirist

- Born: 8 May 1798; Edinburgh
- Died: 25 March 1859 (aged 60); Montreal, Quebec
- Other name: Alpha
- Known for: Poetry, satire

An Auld Friend wi' a New Face, first stanza

"A queer kind o' lott'ry is marriage—
Ye never ken what ye may draw,
Ye may get a braw hoose an' a carriage,
Or maybe get nae hoose ava.
I say na 'tis best to be single,
But ae thing's to me unco clear:
Far better sit lane by the ingle
Than thole what some wives hae to bear."

— Joanna Belfrage Picken 1876

Joanna Belfrage Picken (8 May 1798 – 25 March 1859) was a Scottish-Canadian poet and satirist.

== Life ==
Joanna Belfrage Picken was born in Edinburgh on 8 May 1798 to Ebenezer Picken, a poet from Paisley, Renfrewshire, and Robina Belfrage, a sister to Reverend Henry Belfrage. She was one of nine children, with her siblings including Catherine Picken, Henry Belfrage Picken, and Andrew Belfrage Picken. She and Catherine, the only daughters of Ebenezer and Robina who survived to adulthood, were well educated.

Picken's first poems were contributions to the Glasgow Courier and Free Press in 1828. She and her sister Catherine established a boarding school in Musselburgh, Lothian, but their attempt was a failure, possibly due to uncomplimentary poems that Picken published about local figures.

She emigrated to Montreal, Quebec in 1842 with other family members. She worked as a music teacher while writing poetry under the name "Alpha". She contributed to the Literary Garland and the Montreal Transcript. She died of apoplexy in Montreal on 25 March 1859 and is buried in the Mount Royal Cemetery.

== Poems ==
Picken is best known for the comic poem "An Auld Friend wi' a New Face", which is about the hazards of marriage from a woman's point of view, providing advice to unmarried women about the benefits of remaining single. This poem, alongside one entitled "The Death Watch" were included in James Grant Wilson's 1876 anthology The Poets and Poetry of Scotland. Her work was otherwise unpublished outside of nineteenth-century periodicals. Sixteen more have been recovered, three in Montreal newspapers and thirteen in the possession of her brother Henry's great-great-grandson, with the earliest dating from 1829. Most have a melancholic tone, focused on themes of bitterness, homesickness, sorrow, death, and the release of life. Only two, "To Berwick," and "The Light Guitar" (the latter set to a serenade written by John Barnett) have the comic tone she was renowned for. The uncomplimentary poems of Musselburgh citizens are among those that remain lost.
