= Frederick William Lock =

English painter

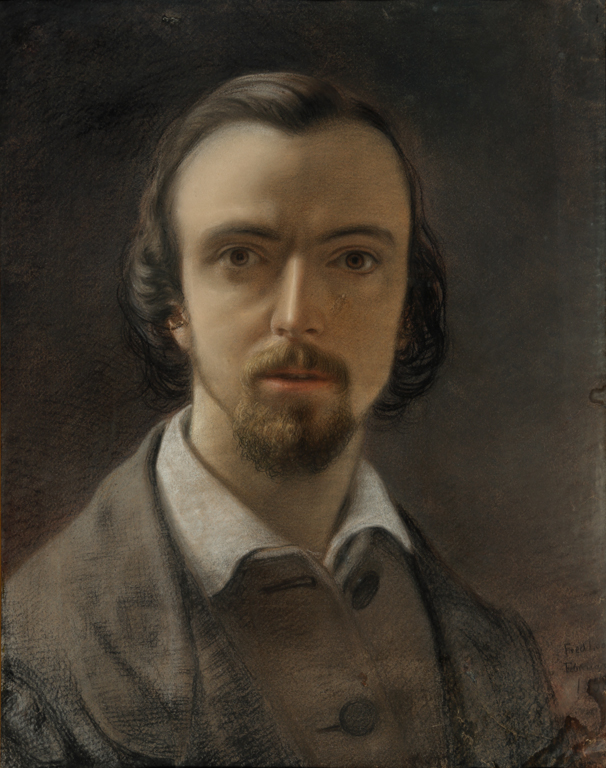
- Frederick W. Lock, self-portrait, M672 Frederick W. Lock, 1858, Pastel, crayon McCord Museum, Montreal
- Born: 1825; St. Marylebone, London, England (baptized 31 May 1825, Moulton, Suffolk, England)
- Died: 3Q 1885; St. Marylebone, London, England
- Occupations: Painter, engraver (portraits, landscapes)
- Spouse(s): Emily Chaffey (first) (1829 - 8 Feb 1859) m. 1856, Montreal, Quebec, Canada. No children. Maria Hancox (second) (1842 - 3Q 1883) m. Oct 1863 Aston, Warwickshire, England. Three children.

Frederick William Lock (active 1841–1863) is known primarily as a Canadian painter of portraits and landscapes. His medium was predominately pastel chalk crayon on paper. Many of Lock's pastel portraits were executed on "dark paper" so that the subject's faces often came out relatively dark-skinned, an unusual technique. A few of his landscapes were lithographed, notably of Niagara Falls and of The Thousand Islands, while others were in pencil, ink and in watercolor. Citations of Lock and his artwork are found in Early Printers and Engravers in Canada by J. Russel Harper, and in The Collector's Dictionary of Canadian Artists at Auction by Anthony R. Westbridge and Diana L. Bodnar.

F. W. Lock's works can be found in the British Museum, The National Gallery, and National Portrait Gallery, London, England; the McCord Museum, National Gallery of Canada, Musée national des beaux-arts du Québec, Montreal, QC; the Royal Ontario Museum, Toronto, Ontario; the Brockville Museum, Brockville, Ontario; the Lac-Brome Museum, Knowlton, Quebec, Canada; and the Harvard/Fogg Museum, Cambridge, Massachusetts, U.S.

== Early life as an artist in England, 1841–1846 ==
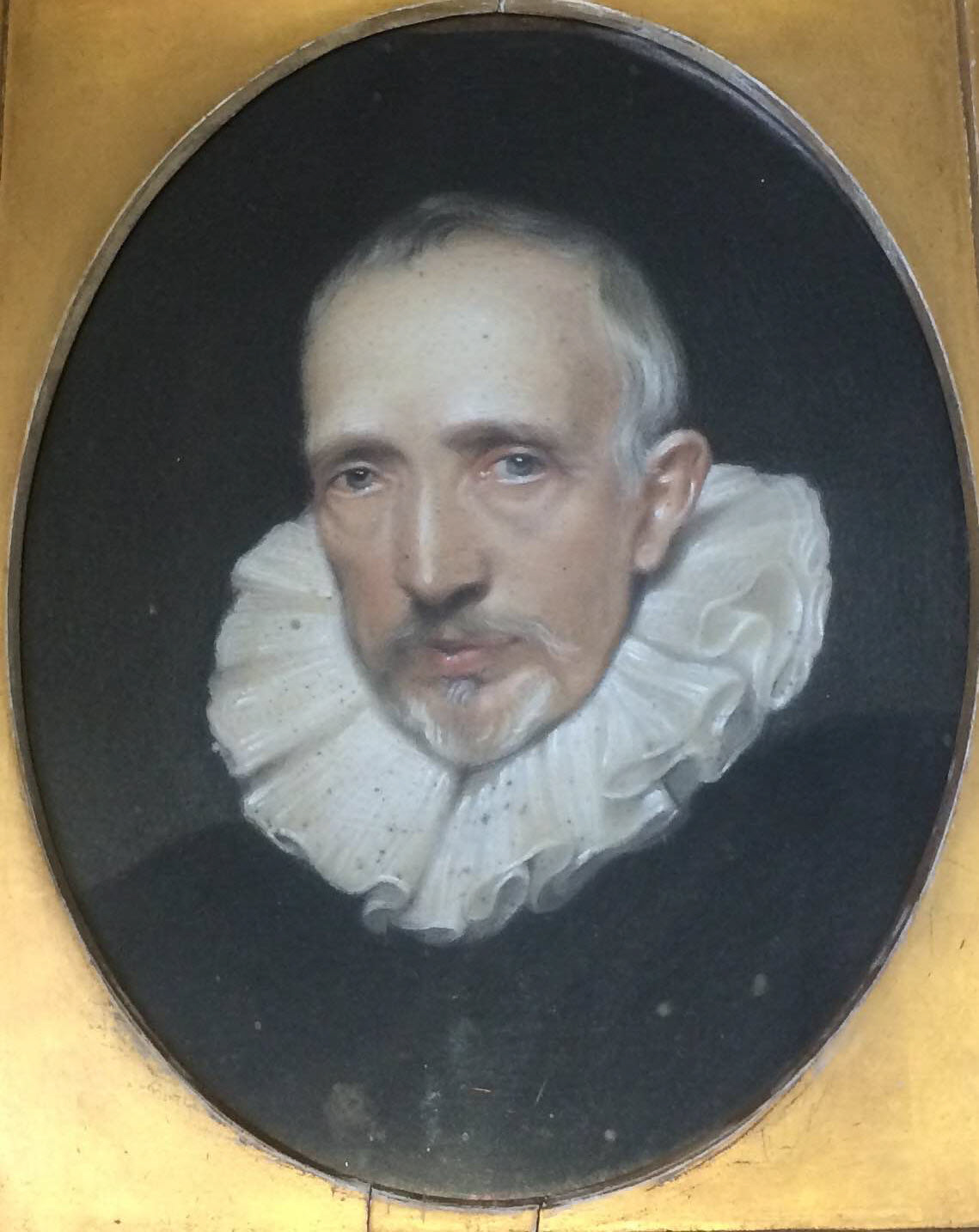
Copy by F.W. Lock, 1841, of a 17th Century Bearded Gentleman with a Ruff, rendered at the National Gallery, London, from the original (c.1620) portrait of Cornelis van der Geest, by Anthony Van Dyck. This painting is a pastel on heavy paper, undated, with an inscription on its backing board: "A Portrait - F W Lock, 61 Charlotte St, Portland Place."

Lock was born in St. Marylebone parish, London, England, in 1825. As a youth he was enrolled at the National Gallery, London, in 1841 as a copyist (#1072) by William Seguier, the first Keeper of the National Gallery. One of Lock's copyist paintings while at the National Gallery (c. 1841), is his rendering of a 17th Century Bearded Gentleman with a Ruff, a copy of the Portrait of Cornelis van der Geest, by Anthony Van Dyck. Lock worked for a time in England as a lithographer. An 1841 mezzotint proof print of Lock's drawing of Queen Victoria and Prince Albert returning from their wedding ceremony, engraved by Samuel William Reynolds Jr., is in the British Museum collection. That drawing by Lock was later reformatted and published in 1844 by John William Laird, bearing the title The Bridal Morn (Queen Victoria; Prince Albert of Saxe-Coburg-Gotha) is in The National Portrait Gallery collection, London. Another of Lock's drawings, a portrait entitled The Fair Domino, engraved and printed by T. W. Huffman in 1844, is also in the British Museum collection.

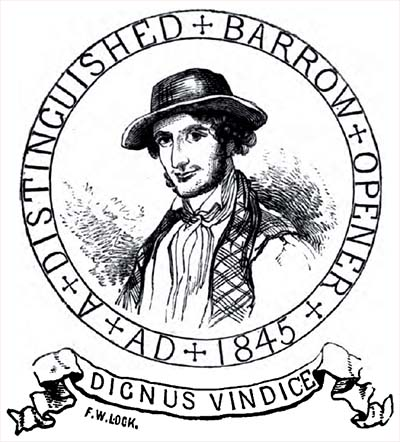
Self portrait by Frederick William Lock, 1845, "Worthy Protector"

In 1845, Lock worked in Derbyshire and Staffordshire as an illustrator of antiquities under Thomas Bateman, a prominent Derbyshire archaeologist and borrow digger. Lock's work assignment with Bateman was likely arranged through Lock's uncle, the Rev. Stephen Isaacson, M. A. of Derbyshire. The two older men were good friends, and both were active members of the British Archaeological Association. Lock also became a member of the archaeological association that year. Bateman, and Rev. Isaacson, exhibited Lock's "extensive series of drawings of weapons, ornaments, etc..." before the association's Central Committee, many of which were reportedly "executed on the spot;" and Lock himself presented at least one paper to the Archaeological Association's Central Committee. A number of watercolor illustrations and pen and ink sketches by Lock were later included in Bateman's first book, Vestiges of the Antiquities of Derbyshire, published in 1848, after Lock had emigrated to Canada. That book by Bateman includes a pen and ink self-portrait by Lock, shown in a circular seal and labeled "A Distinguished Barrow Digger, 1845". Lock may have assisted Bateman in compiling images for that book before emigrating to British North America.

== British Province of Canada, 1846 or 1847 ==
Lock left England for British North America in 1846 or 1847, and settled in Montreal, then the capital of the Province of Canada, initially residing there with his uncle, Robert Philip "Dolly" Isaacson, proprietor of Dolly's Chop House. Isaacson was then a widower whose wife had died in 1822. Isaacson had preceded Lock to Canada in 1832. Isaacson likely helped Lock establish a clientele while Lock was employed in his restaurant.

Lock's earliest known works in Montreal were copies of paintings of French Canadian Parliament ministers James Harvey Price and Denis-Benjamin Viger, both done in 1847. Lock's earliest known commission was the portrait (1847 or 1848) of Major John Richardson, "the first Canadian born novelist and writer to achieve international recognition." The portrait was published in Richardson's book, Richardson's War of 1812; a print of the portrait is held by the Library and Archives, Canada.

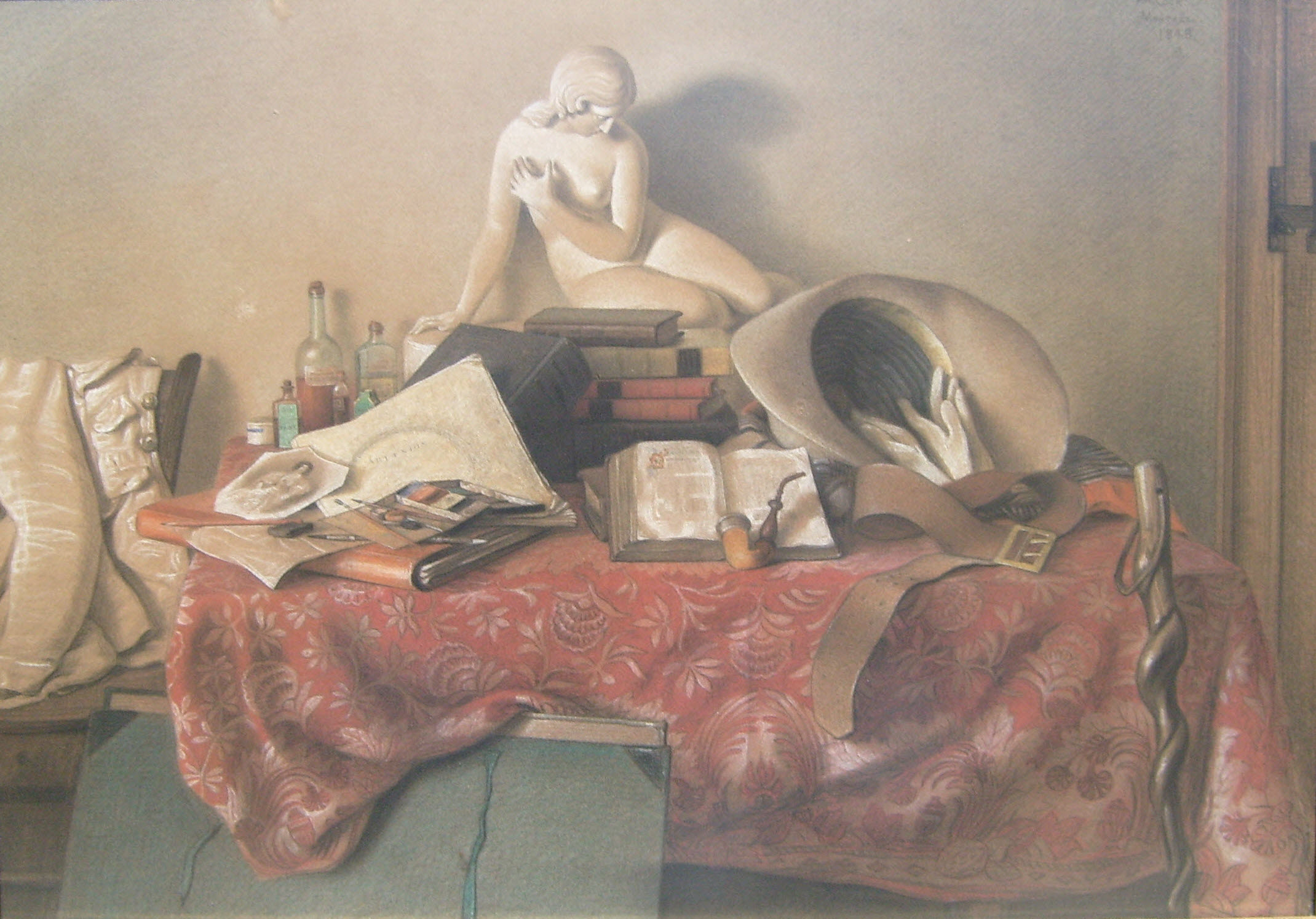
The Artist's Possessions, by F. W. Lock, 1848, Montreal, Quebec, Canada

In 1848, Lock painted an interior view of his room in Montreal, one of only two still-life paintings by Lock yet identified, showing a table cluttered with books, personal items and his "tools of the trade," that's been titled The Artist's Possessions (17.4 x 24.5 inches). During the next seven years, Lock painted subjects in and around Montreal, and westward as he traveled along the developing waterways through much of populated Ontario, most notably Bytown, later renamed Ottawa by Queen Victoria in 1854 during the time that Lock was there. The report by Harper that Lock "visited... in Manchester Vermont 1849" may be based on a possibly misleading statement in a letter dated Oct. 28, 1945 by Orrin E. Dunlap to the New York Historical Society re: "Newly Discovered American Portrait Painters," stating: "F. F. Sherman reported finding in Manchester (VT) a pastel portrait signed, F.W. Lock, dated 1849…".

Punch in Canada published a political cartoon by Lock on February 3, 1849 titled Young Canada delighted with Responsible Government depicting an infant ("Young Canada") being "delighted" by its Nanny (Governor General, James Bruce, 8th Earl of Elgin) pulling strings of a puppet representing "Responsible Government." The contentious Rebellion Losses Bill, to provide reparation payments to (mostly) French-speaking Lower Canadians whose property had been damaged during the rebellions of 1837, was then being promoted in the Legislature as an imperative of "responsible government." During those deliberations, English speaking Loyalist rioters set fire to the Parliament Buildings in Montreal the night of April 25, 1849 while parliament was in session. The following morning, five men were arrested for instigating the riot and fire, four of whom had spoken publicly in opposition to that bill. That event was "memorialized" in a montage of timely sketches made by Lock, Portraits of Five Gentlemen who were Unjustly Imprisoned, that was promptly published and widely circulated as a Punch in Canada Extra.

In 1853, Lock began working from Brockville, Ontario, located on the River St. Lawrence, at the foot of the Thousand Islands. There he painted two river views of the town, and numerous portraits of prominent citizens and leaders in the community. That winter of 1855-56 Lock traveled westward to Niagara where he painted at least three views of the falls (two of which were lithographed in color), and a graphite sketch of the falls.

In 1856 Lock and Emily Chaffey (b. 1829) were married at St. George's Anglican Church in Montreal; and afterward made their home in Brockville where Emily's widowed mother and perhaps six of Emily's siblings were living. Lock made another trip to sketch Niagara Falls in winter where he produced one additional graphite sketch of the falls, dated 1857, that has survived. In 1858, Lock worked from his artist's studio on Market Street in Brockville; and it is likely there that Lock painted his self-portrait (featured prominently above), which is in the McCord Museum, Montreal.

Emily died at Brockville on 8 February 1859, cause unknown. Harper reported that Lock "returned to England shortly after her death in 1859;" and Westbridge reported that "in 1859 [Lock] was at Bury St. Edmonds, Suffolk, England." However, Lock was still living in or near Brockville in the summer of 1860 when he painted two views of The Thousand Islands, one in daylight and one in moonlight. Both views were lithographed, prints of which were sold likely to help fund Lock's planned return trip, via Montreal, to his native England.

In the 1860s, the increased availability and economy of photography began threatening Lock's livelihood as a portrait painter. As an example, Lock's eldest brother in law and prominent Brockville builder, Benjamin Chaffey Jr. (1806-1867), chose to be photographed rather than sit for a portrait painter.

By 1862, Lock had returned to Montreal where he painted a second portrait of his aging uncle, Robert Philip "Dolly" Isaacson. "Dolly" Isaacson, a widower, died early the following year on 18 April 1863 at age 73, and was buried at Mount Royal Cemetery, Montreal Region, Quebec, Canada. ("Dolly" Isaacson was born on 2 December 1789 in Cowlinge, Suffolk, England.)

== Return to his native England ==
Lock returned to England from Montreal in 1862, or possibly in 1863 after his uncle "Dolly" Isaacson died and Isaacson's estate was settled. Lock may have been named a partial beneficiary of his uncle "Dolly" Isaacson's estate, though Isaacson may have had descendants (a son, John Helder Isaacson, b. 1820) and designated beneficiaries still living at that time. Harper reported that Lock "remarried in England," and "lived at Bury St. Edmonds, Suffolk." (Vital statistics and marriage details needed here.)

The Illustrated London News, of May 2, 1863 reported " an effective pastel drawing of "The Great Fire in Tooley-street from Primrose Hill (683), by Mr. F. W. Lock; ..." as among "the most noteworthy" being exhibited in Pall-Mall East, London.

In 1868, Lock's works were reportedly exhibited at the Artists Association of Montreal, and the Montreal Museum of Fine Arts.) Perhaps Lock had arranged for a local dealer in Montreal to manage the exhibit and sale of his prints and paintings before leaving Montreal in 1862 or 1863 for England.

In 1877, Lock copied, in watercolor, John Smart's original 1790 Miniature Portrait of Claude Russell of Binfield, Berkshire County, England onto ivory for mounting in an oval traveling case. That case bears the inscription: "Claude Russell/ of Binfield, Berks/ Copied by Mur. Lock in/ 1877 from the original/ which was painted in 1790/ or thereabouts by an artist/ whose initials were/ J.S."

Two works by Frederick W. Lock, Still Life (16 x 12 inches) and Town Scene with Palm Trees (23 x 31 inches) are listed (but with no dates given for the paintings) at FindArtInfo.com.

The last of Lock's known works, Tenerezza (Tenderness), a pastel signed and dated 1878, was sold at auction on May 23, 1989 by Christies, Rome, Italy.

The seeming paucity of artwork produced by Lock after his return to England is puzzling. Perhaps this could be due to Lock's much improved economic status likely acquired as a beneficiary of "Dolly" Isaacson's estate, or from his (possibly) providential new marriage, or a combination of both.

== Chronology of Lock's artwork in Canada, 1847–1862 ==
1847: Photo Print: Portrait of Robert Philip "Dolly" Isaacson, Libby's Emporium, Devon, UK,

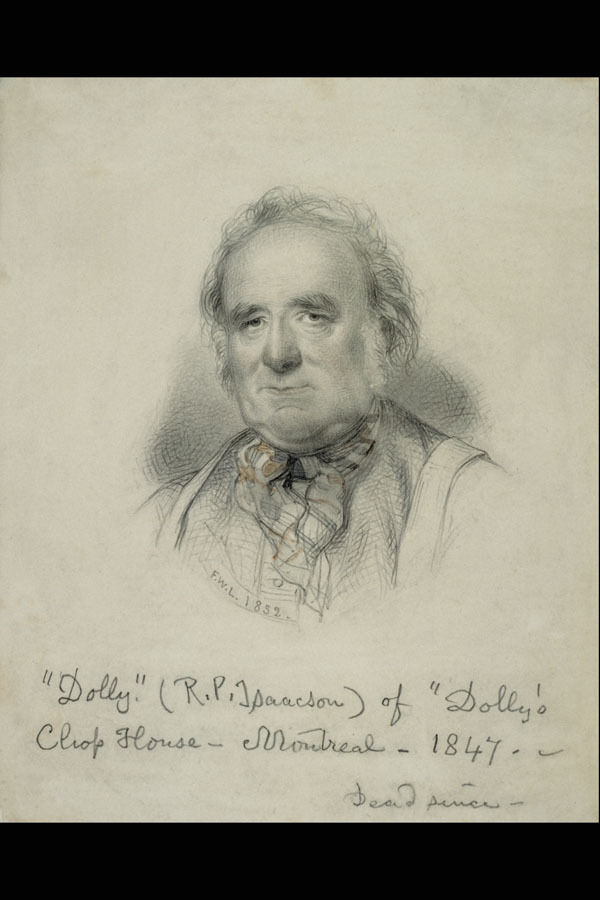
Portrait of Robert Philip "Dolly" Isaacson

1847: Portrait of John Samuel McCord, McCord Museum, Montreal, Accessed 2016-02-09 (Click on "Full Screen" icon above the image to view it in a new window.)

1847: Portrait of James Hervey Price, French Canadian Minister of Parliament, Library & Archives Canada, Accessed 2016-02-10

1847: Portrait of French Canadian Minister of "Upper House" of Parliament, (Denis-Benjamin Viger), Library & Archives Canada, Accessed 2016-02-10

1848: Still-Life Painting of The Artist's Possessions, signed "F. W. Lock / Montreal / 1848 / (and a padlock symbol)." Privately held.

1849: Portrait of Mrs. Anne Ross McCord, McCord Museum, Montreal, Accessed 2016-02-09 (Click on "Full Screen" icon above the image to view it in a new window.)

c.1847-48: Portrait of Major John Richardson, lithograph from the National Archives of Canada, Accessed 2016-02-17

1849: Political Cartoon: Young Canada delighted with Responsible Government, reproduced from Punch in Canada Accessed 2016-01-16 (Also reprinted in Drawing the Lines / Gender, Class, Race and Nation / in Canadian Editorial Cartoons, 1840- 1926, © 2006 by G. Bruce Retallack; U. of Toronto, at page 224.)

1849: Portraits of Five Gentlemen who were Unjustly Imprisoned, McCord Museum, Montreal, Accessed 2015-12-27 (Click on "Full Screen" icon above the image to view it in a new window.) Engraved by John Henry Walker, showing Lock's portraits of the five men accused of Burning of the Parliament Buildings in Montreal

c.1849: Companion Portraits of Mrs. Warre and of Mr. Warre, Gorringes Auctions, Lewes East Sussex, UK. Accessed 2016-02-13

1840s-1850s: Portrait of Isa O'Connor, Library and Archives Canada Accessed 2016-02-10

1850: Poster Print: Portrait of a Young Man in a Victorian Interior, offered at All Posters.com: Accessed 2016-02-09. The original of this print is likely a self-portrait of the artist, Frederick William Lock as he appeared to himself in a mirror. Using his training as a lithographer, Lock afterward converted this mirror image original into a "true-image template" that he used for producing two additional paintings of himself, one in the same "pen and black ink and watercolour," and another in "oil on canvas." Lock's two true image versions of his self-portrait, paired with his two paintings of "the woman in a Victorian Interior," are described immediately below.

1850: Two sets of companion portrait pairs: Portrait of a Young Man in a Victorian Interior; and Portrait of a Woman in a Victorian Interior, Christie's, The Art People. Each of the two pair-sets of companion portraits have identical poses, and are believed to be of Lock and his future wife Emily Chaffey, then age 21; and may have been painted at her widowed mother's home in Brockville, Ontario. The first pair-set is executed in "pen and black ink and watercolour:" Accessed 2016-02-13 The second pair-set of the subject paintings were rendered by Lock "in oil on canvas": Accessed 2016-01-17 and Accessed 2016-01-17.

1851: Portrait of Mrs. John Samuel McCord, McCord Museum, Montreal Accessed 2015-12-24 (Click on "Full Screen" icon above the image to view it in a new window.)

1851: Portrait of Captain Christophilus Garstin, National Gallery of Canada Accessed 2015-12-27

1851: Rideau Falls Near Bytown, Canada West, Library and Archives Canada. Attributed to copyist Mary Frederica Dyneley, after Frederick W. Lock. (No Image of Lock's original drawing found.) Copyist image at: Accessed 2016-02-17 Description only at: Accessed 2015-12-28

1851: The Chaudière Falls from Barrack Hill (Parliament Hill) 1850 through 1851, Bytown, Canada. Library and Archives Canada. Attributed to copyist Amelia Frederica Dyneley, after Frederick W. Lock. (No image of Lock's original drawing found.) Copyist image at: Accessed 2016-02-16 Description only at: Accessed 2015-12-28

1850s: End of Canadian Winter - Pile of ice on Wharf at Montreal. Library and Archives Canada. Accessed 2016-02-10

1851: Ice Jam on the St. Lawrence; a false-color image. Blouin Art Sales Index. Accessed 2016-02-13

1853: Posthumous Portrait of Rev. James Reid, Rector of Trinity Church, Frelighsburg, Quebec. Commissioned by the church congregation that raised funds through the sale of lithographs of the portrait and book of Reid's life, A Diary of a Country Clergyman 1848-1851. Painting is in the Brome County Historical Society Museum, Knowlton, Quebec, Canada. Accessed 2016-02-13

1853: Book Cover Portrait of James Reid (1780-1865), Rector of Trinity Church in the village of Frelighsburg, Quebec, Canada, adapted from portrait by F. W. Lock. Accessed 2016-02-13

1853: Posthumous Portrait of Lord Durham, John Lambton, 1st Earl of Durham. Library & Archives, Canada. Copied by Lock after the 1829 portrait of Lord Durham (1792-1840) by Sir Thomas Lawrence (1769-1830). Accessed 2016-02-10 .

1853: Landscape: A view of Brockville from the west, (Beached rowboat in foreground), Pintrest posting of Lock's paintings, with captions by Doug Grant, Brockville Historian. Accessed 2016-02-09

1853: Portrait of Adiel Sherwood, of Brockville, Ontario. Adiel Sherwood (1779-1874), the Sheriff of Leeds & Grenville Counties, Ontario from 1829 to 1864. Image courtesy of Doug Grant, Brockville Historian. Accessed 2016-02-09 Also, see Brockville Museum, Ontario, description of the painting at: Accessed 2015-12-30

1854 Portrait, Mary Baldwin Sherwood, wife of Adiel Sherwood, Brockville Museum (no image found), description of portrait at: Accessed 2016-02-10

c.1854: Posthumous Portrait of George Longley, (1787-1842) member of the Legislative Assembly of Upper Canada (1829-1830), landowner and businessman in Maitland, Ontario. Accessed 2016-02-09 Image courtesy of Doug Grant, Brockville Historian.

c. 1855 Landscape: Brockville, 1852-1859, (Canoe with paddler on the river), National Gallery of Canada Accessed 2015-12-27

1855: Portrait of Andrew Norton Buell, (1798-1880), barrister, businessman (and brother of William Buell Jr., newspaperman). Brockville Museum, Ontario. Image at: Accessed 2016-02-09 Also, see Brockville Museum, Ontario, description of the painting at: Accessed 2016-02-16

1855: Portrait of Calcina (Richards) Buell (1798-1880), wife of Andrew Norton Buell. Brockville Museum, Ontario. Image at: Accessed 2016-02-09 From the collection of the Brockville Museum. Image courtesy of Doug Grant, Brockville Historian. Also, see Brockville Museum description of the painting at: Accessed 2016-02-16 1856: Portrait of Thomas Allen Stayner, 1856, Deputy Post Master General of British North America, 1827–1851. Library and Archives Canada. Accessed 2016-02-10

c.1856: Portrait of William Buell, Jr., bookseller, editor of the Brockville Recorder, 1823–49, in the Legislative Assembly of Upper Canada in 1828, 1830 and 1836, and Mayor of Brockville, 1856–57. Handbook of Brockville History by Doug Grant. Accessed 2016-02-13

1856: Portrait of François-Xavier Malhiot, elected to the Legislative Assembly of Lower Canada in 1815. Musée national des beaux-arts du Québec Accessed 2015-12-31 (Right click and select: Translate to English.)

1856: Portrait of Amanda et Sophie Malhiot, Musée national des beaux-arts du Québec Accessed 201512-31 (Right click and select: Translate to English.)

1856: Canada Shore, Niagara, January 1856. Canada Heritage Information Network - RiverBrink Art Museum, Village of Queenston, Niagara-on-the-Lake, Ontario. Accessed 2015-12-31 (Click on Thumbnail image to enlarge in a new window.)

1856: Niagara Falls (Chutes de Niagara), Winter View taken from the Canadian side, January 1856. Canada Heritage Information Network - Montreal Museum of Fine Arts. Accessed 2016-01-18 (Click on Thumbnail image to enlarge in a new window.) (Right click and select: Translate to English.)

1856: Print: Niagara Falls, Winter View of Horseshoe Fall Taken From the Canadian Side, February 1856, McCord Museum, Accessed 2015-12-31 (Click on "Full Screen" icon above the image to view it in a new window.)

1856: Print: Summer View of the American and Horseshoe Falls by Moonlight. Taken from the American Side, 1856. Library and Archives Canada. Lithographed by Edmund Walker, Toronto. (No image), Accessed 2015-12-31

1856: Niagara in Winter, (incorrectly dated 1861, but written verso "F.W. Lock 1856") Harvard Art Museums/Fogg Museum, Gift of Frederick R. Koch, Accessed 2015-12-31

1857: Niagara in Winter, 1857 Harvard Art Museums/Fogg Museum, Gift of Frederick R. Koch, Accessed 2015-12-31

1857: Portrait of Érasme Malhiot, Musée national des beaux-arts du Québec (National Museum of Fine Arts of Quebec), Accessed 2015-12-31 (Right click and select: Translate to English.)

1857: Posthumous Portrait of Charles Jones (1781-1840), Brockville, Canada West (Ontario), copied by F. W. Lock, from a prior portrait (undated). The Canadian Anglo-Boer War Museum, Goldi Productions, Mississauga, Ontario. A true color detail from that portrait at: Accessed 2016-02-15 A false color image at: Accessed 2016-02-13.

1857: Portrait of Mr. Jones, likely Charles Edward Jones (d. 1862), son of Charles Jones (1781-1840). Royal Ontario Museum, Toronto. Accessed 2016-02-13

1857: Portrait of a blond haired boy wearing a dark blue coat, a dark blue hat with an insignia, a white lace collar and a peach colored bow tied at his neck. The portrait measures 18 x 23 inches. The portrait is privately held, (untitled). Image courtesy of Doug Grant, Brockville Historian) Accessed 2016-02-09

1858: Self Portrait by Frederick William Lock, 1858/February, McCord Museum, Montreal. Accessed 2016-02-14

1858: Posthumous Portrait of Jonas Jones (1791-1848), Brockville lawyer and member of the Upper Canada Legislative Assembly for Grenville County 1816-1828. He was appointed as a judge in 1837 when he left Brockville and moved to Toronto. Image courtesy of Doug Grant, Brockville Historian. Accessed 2016-02-09

1858: Portrait of Worship Booker McClean, Brockville, Ontario Lawyer - born ca.1821. Image courtesy of Doug Grant, Brockville Historian. Accessed 2016-02-09

1858: Posthumous Portrait of George Keefer (1773-1858), first President (later Chairman) of the Welland Canal Co. Library and Archives Canada, Mrs. G.B. (Margaret K.) Nicholson collection. (Listed, but no image.) Accessed 2015-12-31

1858: Portrait of George Malloch, Brockville attorney (and partner of William Buell Richards, the first Chief Justice of Canada). Royal Ontario Museum. Accessed 2016-02-13

1859: Portrait of Elizabeth Stewart Malloch, wife of George Malloch. Royal Ontario Museum. Accessed 2016-02-13

1860: Landscape Print, A Calm Summer-Day among The Thousand Islands, River Saint Lawrence, Canada, Library and Archives Canada Accessed 2016-02-10

1860: Landscape Print: Summer Moonlight among The Thousand Islands, River Saint Lawrence, Canada Library and Archives Canada Accessed 2016-02-10

1862: Portrait of Robert Phillip "Dolly" Isaacson, McCord Museum, Montreal. This portrait of Isaacson is the second of two by Lock; the first was done in 1847. Accessed 2015-12-24 (Click on "Full Screen" icon above the image to view it in a new window.)
