= Eliza Lanesford Cushing =

American novelist (1794–1886)

Eliza Lanesford Cushing (October 19, 1794 – May 4, 1886) was an American-Canadian dramatist, short story writer, and editor. The daughter of Hannah Webster Foster and sister of Harriet Vaughan Cheney, both novelists, she wrote a number of plays including Esther and The Fatal Ring, and edited Literary Garland, Canada's main literary magazine at the time.

== Biography ==
Cushing was born in Brighton, Massachusetts, and published two early novels in Boston, Saratoga and Yorktown, in 1820s. In 1828, she married Canadian doctor Frederick Cushing, and in 1833 moved to Montreal with him. Her sister Harriet had also married a Canadian and moved to Montreal, and the two regularly contributed stories and poems to the Literary Garland, Cushing publishing under her initials "E.L.C." Cushing also continued publishing in the United States, with short stories and plays appearing in the Philadelphia-based Godey's Lady's Book. Cushing's husband died in 1846 of typhus contracted from immigrants he was treating; Cheney's husband had died in 1845, and in 1847 the two sisters founded the Snow-Drop, a monthly girls' magazine "primarily concerned with social roles and domestic responsibilities appropriate for young women." Cushing also took over as editor of the Literary Garland after its editor John Gibson died in 1850, though the magazine ceased publication in 1851 when the success of Harper's New Monthly Magazine put it out of business. She died in 1886.

== Selected works ==
- Prose:
  - The Sunday-School, or Village Sketches (1820, with Harriet Cheney)
  - Saratoga: A Tale of the Revolution (1824, anonymous)
  - Yorktown: An Historical Romance (1826, anonymous)
  - Arabella Stuart (1839)
  - "Grace Morley: A Sketch from Life" (1839)
  - "A Canadian Legend" (1839)
  - "A Tale of the Richelieu" (1839)
  - "The Rose Feast" (1840)
  - "The Knight of Navarre" (1843)
  - "The Musk-Rose" (1843)
  - "The Neglected Wife" (1843)
  - "A Leaf from an Old Chronicle" (1844)
  - "The Fairies' Fountain" (1844)
  - "The Fatal Prediction" (1844)
  - "The Indian Maid: A Traditionary Tale" (1846)
  - "Deaf Molly" (1848)
- Drama and verse:
  - Esther: A Sacred Drama (1838)
  - The Parting of Boabdil and Morayma (1839)
  - Dramatic Sketch (1839)
  - "To the Planet Venus" (1839)
  - Dramatic Scene: Verse Dialogue Between Naomi and Ruth (1840)
  - "April" (1840)
  - "Lines written after hearing Mr. Buckingham's description of the very ancient willow" (1840)
  - Judith: A Poem (1840)
  - The Fatal Ring (1840)
  - Society Idyls (1841)
  - Return to an Early Home (1843)
  - "True Joy" (1843)
  - Dramatic Sketch from Scripture History (1844)
  - "The Emigrant" (1844)
  - "Rustic Hospitality: A Sketch" (1846)
- The Snow-Drop (periodical, 1847–52, with Harriet Cheney)
