= Ebenezer Picken =

Scottish poet and songwriter

- Born: January 1769; Paisley, Renfrewshire, Scotland
- Died: 1816 (Age 47); Edinburgh, Scotland
- Education: University of Glasgow
- Occupations: Poet, Merchant, Language Teacher, Music Teacher
- Writing career
- Language: English, Scots
- Period: 1787-1816

Ebenezer Picken (January 1769 – 1816) was a Scottish poet and songwriter known as "The Poet of Paisley." He wrote poetry in English and Scots and produced a dictionary of Scottish words which was published posthumously.

== Biography ==
=== Early life ===
Ebenezer Picken was born on Wellmeadow Street in Paisley, Renfrewshire in 1769. (Note: Some nineteenth-century sources refer to a 1770 birth date, but this is inconsistent with the baptism date and the majority of sources.) He was baptized 26 January 1769 at the Oakshaw East Association Congregation, to parents Ebenezer Picken and Agnes Ingraham. His father was a weaver who had come to Paisley from Ayrshire due to the success in handloom weaving in Paisley. Picken was an only son, and his father gave him a good education at the Paisley Grammar School, with the intention he would enter the priesthood and join a body of Presbyterian Dissenters that he himself belonged to.

=== Education and career ===
Picken studied clerical work at the University of Glasgow from 1785 to 1790. However, a passion for poetic verse interfered with his studies, and he published his first small volume of poems at age eighteen in 1787. He was close friends with poet and ornithologist Alexander Wilson, a fellow Paisley resident of his generation. Wilson's first published poems, in 1790, included an epistle to Picken. Both Picken and Wilson travelled to a meeting at the Edinburgh Pantheon on 14 April 1791, where they competed in a disputation on Scottish poetry. Picken argued that Allan Ramsay had done the most honour to Scottish poetry while Wilson argued for Robert Fergusson. Neither man won the competition, with the prize going to one Mr. Cumming who alleged obtained it "by false means." Picken and Wilson published their pieces together in a pamphlet entitled "The Laurel Disputed" before leaving Edinburgh.

In 1791 Picken opened and taught at a school in Falkirk. Shortly afterwards, he married Robina Belfrage, daughter of John Belfrage, Reverend of the Burgher Church in Falkirk, and sister of Reverend Henry Belfrage. By the end of 1791, he was appointed teacher at an endowed school in Carron, Stirlingshire where he taught for five years, struggling with poverty.

In 1796, after struggling as a teacher in Carron, Picken moved to Edinburgh where he attempted to manage a new mercantile business he started. This attempt at business proved unsuccessful, so he returned to teaching languages and music from his home on Bristo Street in Edinburgh. Bristo Street and the buildings there were destroyed between 1967 and 1970 following Edinburgh's redevelopment plans.

=== Later life and death ===
Picken and his family lived in near poverty in Edinburgh, with his language tutoring and selling subscriptions to his poetry unable to generate sufficient income. His health gradually failed and he died of tuberculosis in 1816, leaving his widow Robina, three sons, and two daughters.

== Family ==
Picken ensured a good education for his two daughters: Catherine Picken and Joanna Belfrage Picken. Both women attempted to establish a boarding school in Musselburgh, Midlothian but had little success due to Joanna Picken's uncomplimentary satire of locals. They emigrated to Montreal, Quebec in 1842, and Joanna Picken followed her father's footsteps by teaching music and publishing poetry.

Picken's second son, Andrew Belfrage Picken (1802—1842), served as Private Secretary to Gregor MacGregor during the Poyais Scheme, later returning to Edinburgh in poverty and emigrating to Montreal where he became a drawing teacher and poet.

== Works and impact ==
Picken's major impact came from his works "Poems and Epistles, mostly in the Scottish Dialect," which included a glossary, and from his "Pocket Dictionary of the Scottish Dialect," which served as major sources for John Jamieson's Scottish dictionary. Jamieson's work was the first complete dictionary of the Scots language and the first work in both English and Scottish lexicography to take an historical approach. Pickens' own dictionary, containing 5,000 words, was published posthumously and anonymously in 1818 by Edinburgh bookseller James Sawers, and it was through Jamieson's work that he was referenced as producing the definitions.

Works of satire, descriptive pieces, and songs had earned Picken local popularity in his lifetime, and some of his songs remained popular in Scotland well into the 1890s. George Eyre-Todd notes that it was these works that reflect Picken's writing, and that his verse, and especially epistolary poetry, were mere echoes of Robert Burns.

In 1815, a year before his death, Picken helped Dr. Andrew Duncan publish a volume on monumental inscriptions within Edinburgh graveyards. Duncan had all profits of the book go to Picken and his family, writing: "If any profit shall arise from this present Publication, it will be entirely appropriated to [Picken's] benefit. Those gentlemen, therefore, who have encouraged the design, by subscribing for copies, may have some satisfaction in reflecting, that, while they are paying honour to departed worth, they are at the same time aiding a Man of Genius,—an unfortunate trader, but a respectable Poet."
