= Boarding School (disambiguation) =

Boarding school is an educational institution.

Boarding School may also refer to:

== Film ==
- Passion Flower Hotel (film), a 1978 film that is titled Boarding School in some regions
- Boarding School (2018 film), a horror film by Boaz Yakin

== See also ==
- The Boarding School (disambiguation)
