= François Malhiot =

Canadian politician

François Malhiot (October 20, 1733 – January 28, 1808) was a businessman and political figure in Lower Canada.

He was born at Montreal in 1733, the son of Jean-François Malhiot. In 1768, he married his cousin Élisabeth, the daughter of Ignace Gamelin, and settled at Verchères. He sold dry goods, lent money for mortgages and speculated in the grain trade. He also invested in land. His property was damaged and Malhiot was taken prisoner during the American invasion of Quebec in 1775–6. In 1792, he was elected to the 1st Parliament of Lower Canada representing Surrey. Malhiot was named a justice of the peace in 1799 and also served as a colonel in the local militia.

He died at Verchères in 1808.

His son François-Xavier also became a member of the legislative assembly and later was a member of the legislative council.
