= John Crawford (physician) =

Irish physician (1746–1813)

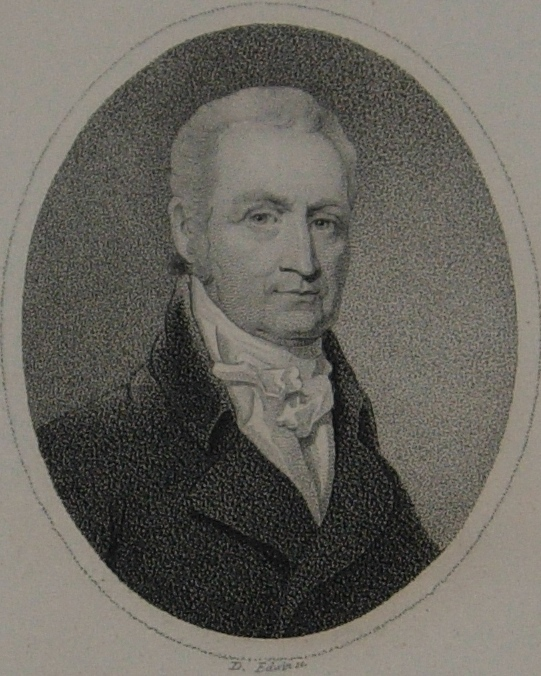
- Born: 3 May 1746; Northern Ireland
- Died: 9 May 1813; Baltimore
- Occupation: Medical doctor

John Crawford (3 May 1746 – 9 May 1813), an introducer of vaccination into America and investigator into the cause of disease, was born in the north of Ireland May 3, 1746. He was the second of four sons of a Protestant clergyman, all of whom became professional men, his brother Adair being physician to St. Thomas' Hospital, London, and professor of chemistry at Woolwich.

== Education ==
At seventeen Crawford entered Trinity College Dublin, and afterwards went to the Leyden University, where he graduated M. D. He then made two voyages to the East Indies as surgeon in the East India Company's service.

== Career ==
About 1778, Crawford was married and shortly after received an appointment as surgeon to the Naval Hospital on the Island of Barbadoes, a position of great responsibility.

In 1780 a terrible hurricane devastated the island, whereupon Crawford furnished aid and medicines to the afflicted inhabitants without stint and without compensation. In 1781 he returned to England on account of bad health and during the voyage lost his wife. In 1790 he received from the Dutch government the appointment of surgeon-major to the colony of Demerara in South America; there he had charge of a military hospital of sixty to eighty beds.

In 1796 Crawford went to Baltimore. Here he helped forward the founding of the Baltimore General Dispensary, 1801; the penitentiary, 1802; the Bible Society, and the Baltimore Library. He delivered courses on natural history at the College of Medicine in 1811 and 1812, and his introductory lecture on “The Cause, Seat and Cure of Diseases” is extant.

He held high rank in his profession, being censor, examiner, orator, and member of the committee to publish the Transactions of the Medical and Chirurgical Faculty, and consulting physician to the Board of Health and City Hospital. He was among the first in America to use vaccine virus, which he did in the summer of 1800, a date contemporaneous with that of its use by Dr. Waterhouse, of Massachusetts, who has been given the credit of its first use in the Western Hemisphere. He wrote many medical articles of great interest and value in the medical journals of the day.

== Research ==
What most rivets attention on John Crawford is his remarkable research into the cause of disease. As early as 1790 he conceived—entirely independently—the idea of a living contagium—minute animalcula gaining access to the human body and there depositing germs to develop and produce disease.

He ransacked the whole realm of nature and brought together a great mass of evidence to prove this theory which he maintained, notwithstanding its unpopularity and prejudice to his professional success, with all the ardor of absolute conviction. He pointed out that man, not withstanding his superior nature and possession of a soul, was subjected to the same laws as the lower animals. He enunciated the doctrine of universal parasitism. He argued convincingly from the known to the unknown, and declared prophetically that while the minute animalcula could not then be demonstrated (in fact, the necessary microscopes already existed, but were expensive, and systematic research was lacking), they are not beyond the reach of human ken and in due time would be recognized.

He compares the action of the seeds of disease to the vegetable seeds—each of which gives rise to its respective plant, and to that only. He not only held these views, but displayed his consistency by carrying them out to their legitimate conclusion—he applied them to the prevention and treatment of disease. The bigotry and prejudices of his contemporaries compelled him to publish his opinion in a non medical periodical, The Baltimore Observer, in which they appeared in 1806 and 1807 under the heading “Quarantine.” We may conclude that John Crawford made an independent discovery of this theory, and so far as was known to Eugene Cordell in 1920 he was named the first in all history who investigated it in a thorough and scientific manner.

== Death and legacy ==
John Crawford died in Baltimore on May 9, 1813, after a short illness and was buried in Westminster churchyard. He was survived by one daughter, who married Maximilian Godefrey, an eminent French architect of Baltimore with whom she returned to France. Dr. Crawford's large reference library is preserved in the University of Maryland. His articles are to be found in the American Medical Repository, the Baltimore Observer, and the Medical and Physical Recorder, Baltimore; in Schultz's History of Freemasonry in Maryland, vol. ii, 1885, and in Cordell's Medical Annals of Maryland. There is a crayon portrait and an MS. work on Tropical Diseases in the library of the Medical and Chirurgical Faculty.

He was a prominent freemason, and in his letters to Thomas Jefferson argued for gradual emancipation of slaves.

== See also ==
- History of malaria
- Mosquito-malaria theory
