= Wacousta =

Book by John Richardson

Wacousta is a novel by John Richardson. It was first published in December 1832 by Thomas Cadell in London and William Blackwood in Edinburgh. Wacousta is sometimes claimed as the first Canadian novel, although in fact it is preceded by Julia Catherine Beckwith's St. Ursula's Convent; or, The Nun of Canada (Kingston, 1824). Wacousta is better categorized as the first attempt by a Canadian-born author at historical fiction.

However, it is one of the first novels written by a Canadian-born author about Canada, and, in spite of its overwrought sentimentalism, it has been treated as a seminal work in the development of a Canadian literary sensibility.

Its themes include prophecy and opposites, such as manliness vs. effeminacy, wilderness/wildness vs. civilization, sensibility vs. compassion and the natural vs. the supernatural among others.

In the period of publication, Wacousta was quite popular in both Canada and the United States. Wacousta competed with the US contemporary novel The Last of the Mohicans by James Fenimore Cooper, but while Cooper's novel focuses on the efforts of the individual within the whole, Richardson's novel concerns itself with broader cross-cultural motivations.

Canadian critic Joseph Pivato has pointed out that the image of the British settlers huddled together inside the fort inspired Northrop Frye to propose his "garrison mentality" theory for Canadian literature.

== Works cited ==
- Cronk, Douglas Richard, ed. (1987). Wacousta. Carleton University Press. ISBN 0-88629-038-4. OCLC 243600834.
- Frye, Northrop. The Bush Garden: Essays on the Canadian Imagination (1971)
