= Shawinigan (Province of Canada electoral district) =

Coordinates: 47°33′6.6″N 73°25′7.9″W

Division of Shawinigan
Province of Canada electoral district

Defunct pre-Confederation electoral district
- Legislature: Legislative Assembly of the Province of Canada
- District created: 1854
- District abolished: 1867
- First contested: 1856
- Last contested: 1862

The division of Shawinigan was established in 1854, under the Union regime of 1841, after the seats of the Legislative Council of the Province of Canada became elective. It roughly covered the Mauricie area in Quebec and was represented by one Legislative Councillor. Elections were held every six years starting in 1856, renewing a third of the Council every two years.

The first member for the division of Shawinigan was elected in 1862. His term was shortened by the constitutional change of 1867.

== Legislative Council (1862-1867) ==
| Name | Party | Election |
|---|---|---|
| Charles-Christophe Malhiot | Parti rouge | 1862 |

== See also ==
- Division of Shawinigan (Legislative Council)
- History of Canada
- History of Quebec
- Politics of Canada
- Politics of Quebec
- Senatorial Division of Shawinigan
- Shawinigan
- Trois-Rivières
