= Charles-Christophe Malhiot =

Canadian politician

The Hon. Charles-Christophe Malhiot

Senator for De la Vallière, Quebec
- In office October 23, 1867 – November 9, 1874
- Appointed by: Royal Proclamation
- Succeeded by: Anselme-Homère Pâquet

Personal details
- Born: October 11, 1808 Verchères, Lower Canada
- Died: November 9, 1874 (aged 66) Pointe-du-Lac, Quebec
- Party: Liberal
- Education: College of Montreal
- Occupation: Doctor, Politician

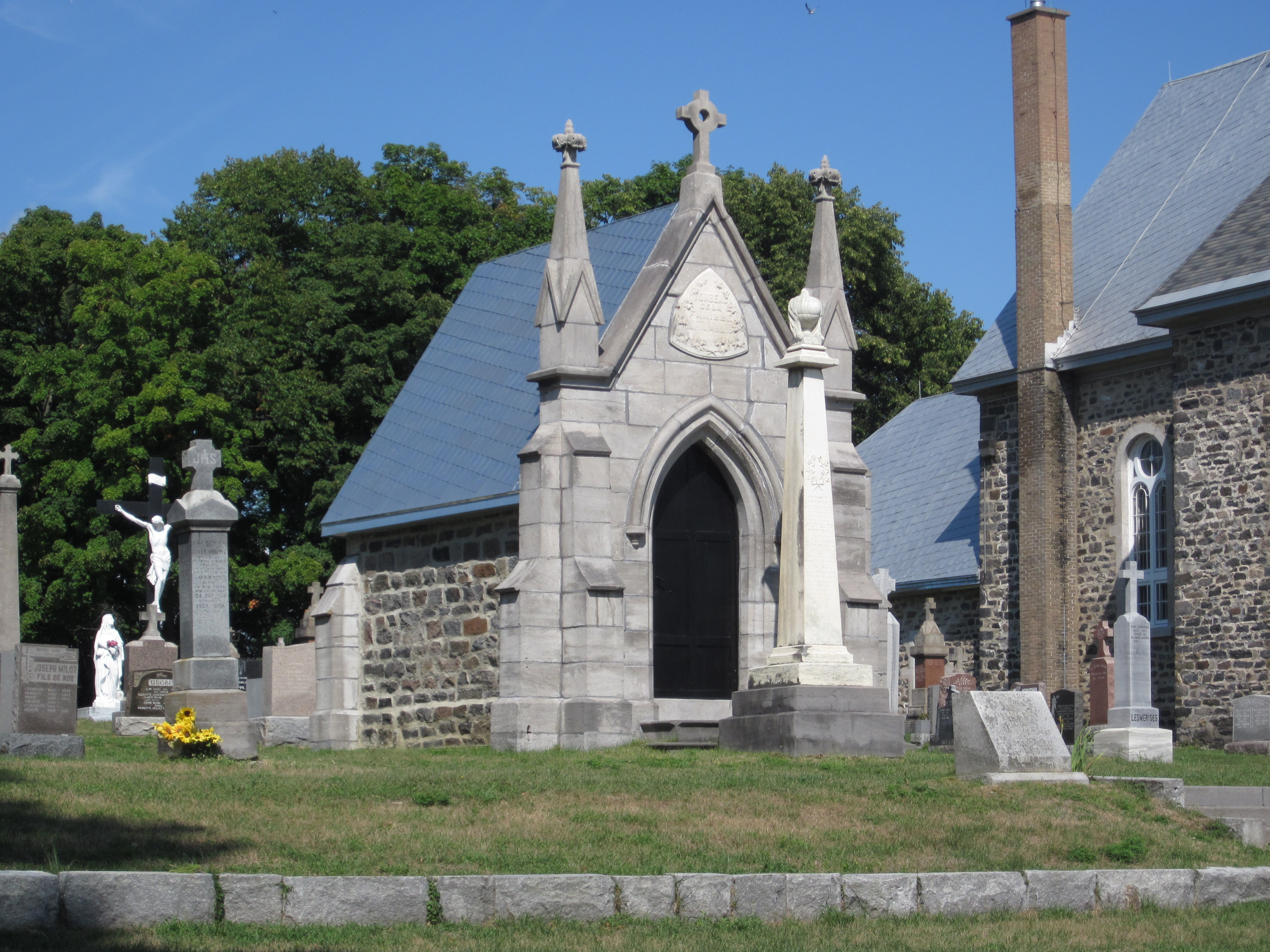
The Montour-Malhiot Funeral Chapel in the Pointe-du-Lac district of Trois-Rivières

Charles-Christophe Malhiot (October 11, 1808 – November 9, 1874) was a medical doctor and a member of the Senate of Canada from 1867 until his death.

He was born in Verchères in Lower Canada, the son of François-Xavier Malhiot, the seigneur of Verchères. He studied medicine and settled at Yamachiche. In 1835, he married Julie-Éliza Montour, the daughter of Nicholas Montour, Seigneur of Pointe-du-Lac. He was mayor of Pointe-du-Lac from 1859 to 1864. In 1862, he was elected for a six-year term to the Legislative Council of the Province of Canada representing Shawinigan. After Confederation, he was appointed to the Senate as a member of the Liberal Party.

He died at Pointe-du-Lac in 1874.
