= John Richardson (author) =

British Army officer and Canadian novelist (1796–1852)

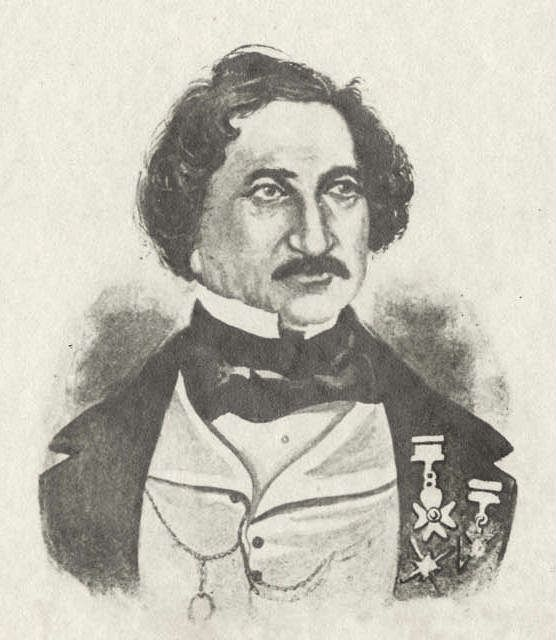
- Major John Richardson by Frederick William Lock
- Born: 4 October 1796; Queenston, Ontario, Upper Canada, British Empire
- Died: 12 May 1852 (aged 55); New York City, U.S.
- Occupations: Soldier, novelist

John Richardson (4 October 1796 – 12 May 1852) was a Canadian officer in the British Army who became the first Canadian-born novelist to achieve international recognition.

== Life ==
Richardson was born at Fort George or in Queenston on the Niagara River in 1796. His mother Madelaine was the daughter of the fur trader John Askin and an Odawa woman Monette. His father, Dr. Robert Richardson, was a surgeon with the Queen's Rangers. As a young boy, Richardson lived for a time with his grandparents in Detroit and later with his parents at Fort Malden, Amherstburg. His step-mother, Marie Archange Barthe, told him of stories about early Detroit and the Siege of Fort Detroit in 1763, which inspired his interest in writing.

At age 16, Richardson enlisted in the British 41st Regiment of Foot. During his service with this regiment. he met Chief Tecumseh and Major General Isaac Brock, whom he later wrote about in his novel The Canadian Brothers. While stationed at Fort Malden during the War of 1812, Richardson witnessed the execution of an American prisoner by Indigenous forces at the River Raisin, a traumatic experience which haunted him for the rest of his life. During the War of 1812, Richardson was imprisoned for a year in Kentucky United States after his capture during the battle of Moraviantown.

Richardson was commissioned into the 8th Foot in 1813, exchanged into the 2nd Foot in 1816 and transferred to the 92nd Foot in 1818. His later military service took him to England and, for two years, to the West Indies. While in the West Indies, Richardson was appalled by the treatment of slaves there.

Richardson stated that his mixed racial background made him uneasy with his fellow officers in the West Indies. This is surprising given the stereotypical and racist treatment of First Nations people in his novels. Although Richardson's most savage characters, Wacousta in the novel Wacousta (1832) and Desborough in The Canadian Brothers (1840), are in fact white men who have turned "savage," his depiction of other Indigenous characters typically affirms a European settler perspective that envisions Indigenous people as pre-modern, irrational, and innately warlike.

Richardson began his fiction-writing career with novels about the British and French societies of his time. In his third and most successful novel, Wacousta, he turned to the North American frontier for his setting and history. He followed the same practice in the sequel, The Canadian Brothers.

From 1820 to 1827 he lived in Paris and traveled throughout Europe, as he spoke fluent French, according to David Beasley. He returned to London in the fall of 1827. David Beasley has identified him as the anonymous author of The Roué; or The Hazards of Women, The Oxonians: A Glance at Society, and Écarté; or the Salons of Paris.

In 1838, after fighting with the British during the Spanish First Carlist War, Richardson returned to Canada from England, promoted to the rank of major. He tried to earn his livelihood by writing fiction and by setting up a series of weekly newspapers. He was appointed superintendent of the police on the Welland Canal in 1845, but was fired the next year. In 1849 Richardson moved to New York City, where he continued to write fiction. However, his attempts to build a literary career in the US failed.

John Richardson died (supposedly of starvation) in New York City in 1852. He was buried in the paupers' cemetery in New York; his grave site is unknown.
