= François-Xavier Malhiot =

Canadian politician

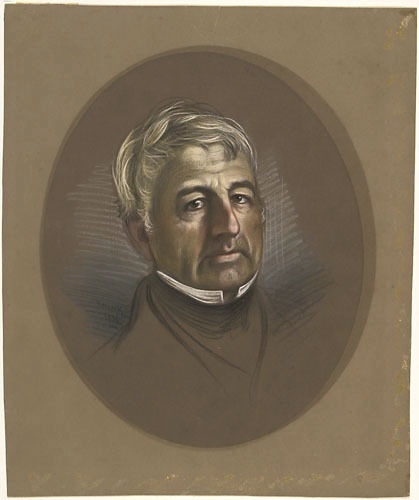
- by F.W.Lock
- Born: 4 December 1781; Verchères, Province of Quebec, British Empire
- Died: 12 June 1854 (aged 72); Boiucherville

François-Xavier Malhiot (December 4, 1781 – June 12, 1854) was a merchant, seigneur and political figure in Lower Canada.

== Life ==
Malhiot was born François-Xavier-Amable Malhiot at Verchères, Quebec in 1781, the son of François Malhiot. Malhiot joined the Royal Canadian Volunteer Regiment as an officer and later became a lieutenant-colonel in the militia, serving during the War of 1812. In 1804, with one of his brothers, he took over the family business. In 1805, he married Julie Laperière and inherited land in the seigneury of Contrecoeur after the death of his father-in-law in 1807; he became principal seigneur in 1818. In 1814, he purchased land in the seigneury of Saint-Ours.

Malhiot was elected to represent Richelieu in the Legislative Assembly of Lower Canada in an 1815 by-election held after an earlier election was declared invalid. In 1828, he was elected for Surrey in a by-election held after Louis-Joseph Papineau, who had been elected in two different ridings, chose to sit for Montreal West. In 1828, Malhiot was dismissed from his position in the militia by Lord Dalhousie after he supported resolutions critical of the governor's behaviour. He was elected to represent Verchères (formerly Surrey) in 1830 but resigned his seat in 1832 after he was named to the Legislative Council. Malhiot did not support those who took up arms against the authorities during the Lower Canada Rebellion. He sold his seigneury in 1846 and retired to Boucherville, where he died in 1854.

His son Charles-Christophe later became a member of the Canadian Senate.
