= The Boarding School; or, Lessons of a Preceptress to Her Pupils =

1798 book by Hannah Webster Foster

The Boarding School; or, Lessons of a Preceptress to Her Pupils, or The Boarding School is a novel written by Hannah Webster Foster which was published in 1798.

== Background ==
The Boarding School was written by Hannah Webster Foster in 1798. Foster is best known for her epistolary novel The Coquette. She published both of her novels as "A Lady of Massachusetts". The Boarding School focuses on a fictitious school called Harmony Grove as another school year ends and a group of students is completing their course of study at the school.

The novel itself focuses on the ideal education to best prepare these women for their future. The narrative portion of the work is supposed to represent the final lessons that the teacher is giving to her students on how to best use the education that they have received at Harmony Grove when they enter into society.

== Plot summary ==
The novel is not divided into chapters, but there are two distinct sections of the work. The first focuses on the school and the week of lessons, and the second section is a collection of letters written between the students and to the teacher. The first section represents a more traditional narrative structure and will be discussed below as the "Narrative" section and the second section is labeled "Letters".

=== Narrative ===
The Narrative portion of the novel serves two purposes. First, it serves as an introduction to Harmony Grove and its preceptress Mrs. Williams and it is also the section that details the final lectures that Mrs. Williams is giving to her students as they are finishing up their time at the school. There are eleven individual lessons ranging from more academic topics such as reading and writing, to artistic pursuits, even to her opinions on more personal subjects of dress and friendship.

Mrs. Williams does not just give the girls her opinions on these matters; she uses examples of past students and girls that she knew to show both the right and wrong things for her students to do in their lives outside of the school. The opinions that are expressed in this section are those of Foster herself, veiled by the fiction this is touted to be.

=== Letters ===
The section of the novel that contains the letters of Harmony Grove students shows how the girls put into practice the lessons that Mrs. Williams taught them. The letters contain commentary on the fashions of the time, both sartorial and cultural, as well as the new graduates adjustments back into the world. Comments are made on the actions of other women who had not been at Harmony Grove, stating whether or not they are appropriate. Using an epistolary structure, Foster attempts to instruct her ideal readers, young women like the characters in the book, in the proper course of behavior and the ideal result of a proper education.
