= Hannah Webster Foster =

18th and 19th-century American novelist

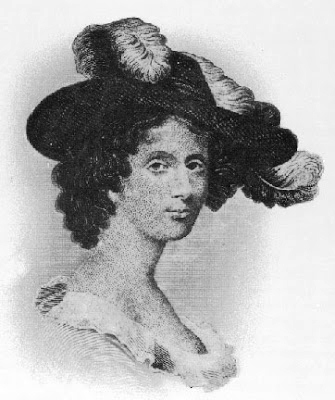
- Born: September 10, 1758/59; Salisbury
- Died: April 17, 1840
- Occupation: Novelist; writer
- Works: The Coquette
- Children: Harriet Vaughan Cheney, Eliza Lanesford Cushing

Hannah Webster Foster (September 10, 1758/59 – April 17, 1840) was an American novelist.

Her epistolary novel, The Coquette; or, The History of Eliza Wharton, was published anonymously in 1797. Although it sold well in the 1790s, it was not until 1866 that her name appeared on the title page. In 1798, she published The Boarding School; or, Lessons of a Preceptress to Her Pupils, a commentary on female education in the United States.

== Biography ==
Born in Salisbury, Massachusetts, the daughter of a wealthy merchant, it is likely that Foster (née Webster) attended an academy for women like the one she described in The Boarding School; certainly, the literary allusions and historical facts contained in her work indicate she was well educated.

In the 1770s she began writing political articles for Boston newspapers, and in 1785 she married a Dartmouth graduate, the Rev. John Foster. The two settled in Brighton, Massachusetts, where John Foster served as a pastor at First Church.

She bore six children, after which she wrote her two books and subsequently returned to newspaper writing. When her husband died in 1829, she moved to Montreal, Quebec, Canada, to be with her daughters. She died in Montreal, aged 81.

== Works ==
Foster's first novel, The Coquette; or, The History of Eliza Wharton (1797) is a fictionalized account of the true story of Elizabeth Whitman, the subject of a sensational news story in New England. Whitman was seduced by an unknown suitor, became pregnant, and died shortly after the birth of her stillborn child at an inn in Danvers, Massachusetts. The story became the subject of many treatises on the dangers of immorality, particularly the sexual immorality of women. Foster's novel follows the same story as the life of the real Elizabeth Whitman, but changes her name to Eliza Wharton and uses a fictional character to stand in for Elizabeth's seducer, who was never conclusively identified. The best-selling novel presents Whitman's story as a morality tale against flirtatiousness, but also depicts Eliza as a sympathetic, complex character, extending the novel's purpose beyond that of simply a sermon against immorality.

Foster's second novel, The Boarding School; or, Lessons of a Preceptress to Her Pupils, an exploration of the topic of women's education, was far less commercially successful than The Coquette. Taking place in a female academy, the novel consists of the headmistress's reflections on morality and the students' letters to each other regarding their education. Through the novel, Foster advocated for women's education.

== Personal life ==
Her daughters Harriet Vaughan Cheney and Eliza Lanesford Cushing were popular writers in the nineteenth century. Cheney published A Peep at the Pilgrims in 1636, Confessions of an Early Martyr, The Rivals of Acadia and Sketches from the Life of Christ. Cushing published Esther, a dramatic poem, and works for the young. The two sisters wrote in conjunction The Sunday-School, or Village Sketches.
