= John R. Anderson (minister) =

African American Baptist minister, educator

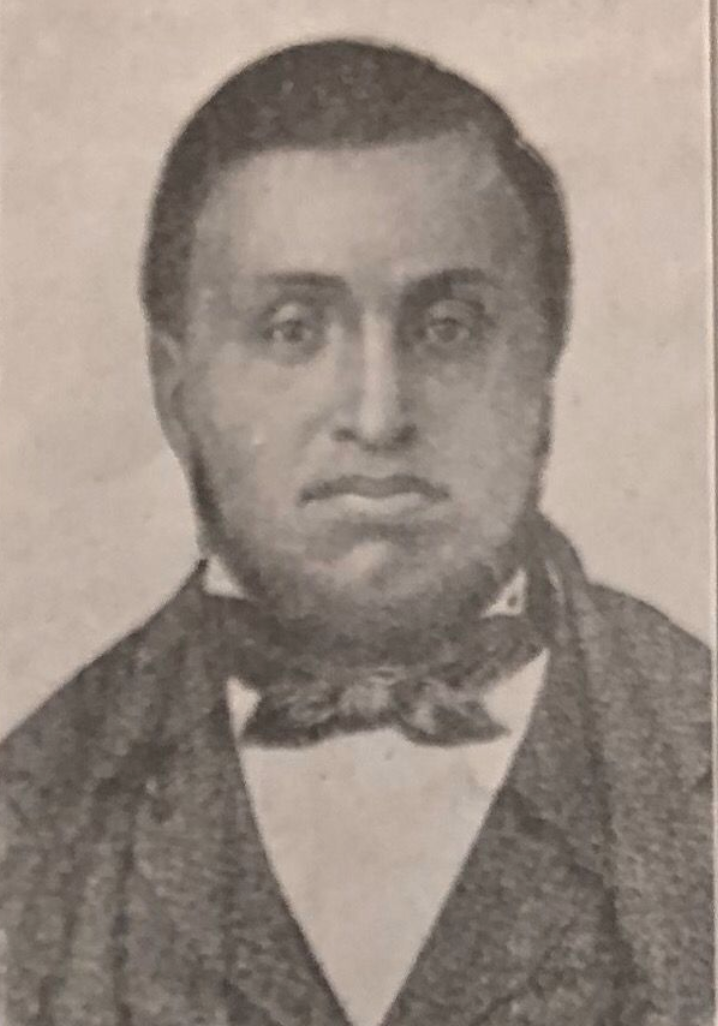
- Born: John Richard Anderson; 1818; Shawneetown, Illinois
- Died: May 20, 1863 (aged 44–45); St. Louis, Missouri
- Burial place: Bellefontaine Cemetery, St. Louis, Missouri
- Other name: J. Richard Anderson
- Occupation: Minister
- Spouse: Nancy Barton Anderson

Ecclesiastical career
- Religion: Baptist
- Church: Central Baptist Church

John R. Anderson, also known as J. Richard Anderson (1818–May 20, 1863), was an American minister from St. Louis, Missouri, who advocated against slavery and for education for African Americans. As a boy, he was an indentured servant, who attained his freedom at the age of 12. Anderson worked as a typesetter for the Missouri Republican and for Elijah Parish Lovejoy's anti-slavery newspaper, the Alton Observer. He founded the Antioch Baptist Church in Brooklyn, Illinois and then returned to St. Louis where he was a co-founder and the second pastor of the Central Baptist Church. He served the church until his death in 1863.

More than half of his congregants were slaves. Reverend Anderson helped enslaved people attain freedom by encouraging them to file freedom suits and by raising funds to emancipate them. He was a minister and spiritual advisor to Harriet Scott and Dred Scott, of the landmark Dred Scott v. Sandford Supreme Court case.

In 1854, Anderson operated the floating Freedom School, after its founder John Berry Meachum's death, and he lobbied for schools for black children. He worked with a ten-person board to bring subscription and public schools to the city. After ten years, a law was enacted in 1864 that provided funding for four or five public schools. There were four subscription schools also established by that year. He founded the first African American Masonic temple west of the Mississippi River in the early 1860s.

== Early life and education ==
John Richard Anderson was born in 1818 in Shawneetown, Illinois. His parents had been enslaved in Virginia. As a child, Anderson was moved to Missouri by the family who owned him. Legally, his past residence in Illinois territory meant that he was free. He moved to Missouri with Sarah Bates, the sister of United States Attorney General Edward Bates. (Note: The Bates were slaveholders. Edward, his mother, and his sister Sarah had owned slaves, and freed dozens of them during their lifetime and through their wills. In 1860, Sarah freed 32 slaves, previously having freed up to eight enslaved people.) While he was technically an indentured servant, he was treated like a slave until the age of 12, when he attained his freedom. Anderson and his mother Chloe Anderson were emancipated by Sarah Bates on January 25, 1830. (Note: Bellamy states that Anderson was owned by Edward Bates.)

As a child, he learned to read at the Sunday school of the First Colored Church, which was established by Reverends James Welch and John Mason Peck. Anderson received most of his education in reading and theology at John Berry Meachum's "Freedom School," which was conducted on a riverboat in the Mississippi River. He sought to take advantage of evening schools in St. Louis, but was told to leave when it was discovered that he was not white. Anderson was baptized at the First African Baptist Church.

== Newspapers ==
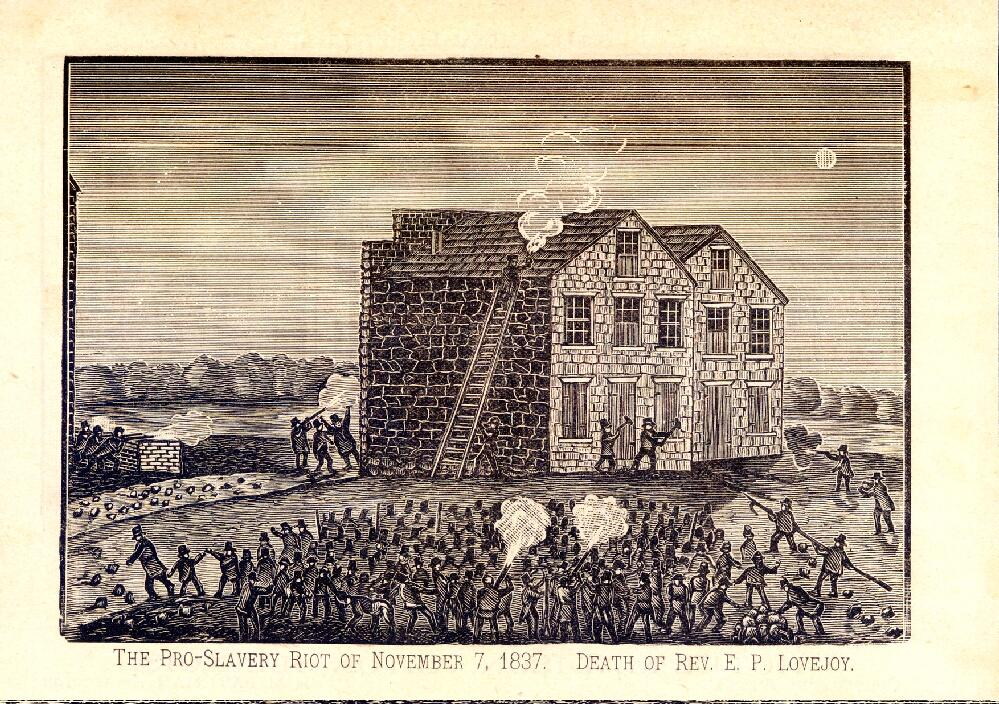
Woodcut showing a large group of armed men attacking the Alton Observer building on November 7, 1837. The riot resulted in the death of Reverend Elijah Parish Lovejoy, abolitionist, newspaper editor, and Presbyterian minister. Photograph and Prints collections, Missouri History Museum

Anderson was hired out as a slave to distribute the Missouri Republican newspaper. He performed so well that he was taken into the office to work as a press roller, and then a typesetter. Anderson moved to Alton, Illinois with the anti-slavery activist and editor Elijah Parish Lovejoy and worked as his typesetter for the Alton Observer. He was working when Lovejoy was killed in Alton, Illinois in 1837, and was an eyewitness to his murder and the destruction of the printing press.

== Ministry ==
Anderson was ordained at the Union Baptist Church in Alton. In 1838, Anderson founded the Antioch Baptist Church at his home in Brooklyn, Illinois. Back in St. Louis, he established a white-washing business with Richard Sneethen.

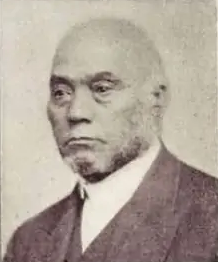
Reverend Richard Sneethen, Anderson's business partner and the first minister of the Central Baptist Church. Anderson was the church's second minister.

Anderson was a minister for the First African Baptist Church in St. Louis until he resigned in June 1846. With 20 others, he founded the Central Baptist Church in August 1846. (Note: The church was founded as the Second Colored Baptist Church and was also known as the Eighth Street Baptist Church. It was one of five Baptist and Methodists churches in the city, with a total of around 1500 free and enslaved parishioners.) Rev. Richard Sneethen was the church's first minister. In 1847, Anderson became an associate pastor of the church with Sneethen. When Sneethen accepted a new position at a church in Louisville, Kentucky, Anderson became the second pastor, a position he held from 1849 to 1863. More than half of the congregants were enslaved men and women. To walk the streets and attend church, they needed approval in the form of a pass from their slaveholders. Unable to support himself and his family on the earnings from the church, Anderson worked in the City Jail as an assistant police officer for the rest of his life.

In 1852, the edifice for the Central Baptist Church was completed at the cost of $12,000 (equivalent to $414,643 in 2025). Anderson gave one year's salary to the edifice fund and raised the rest of the money. Each year, he held a revival. By the 1850s, Anderson served more than 1,000 parishioners.

== Activist ==
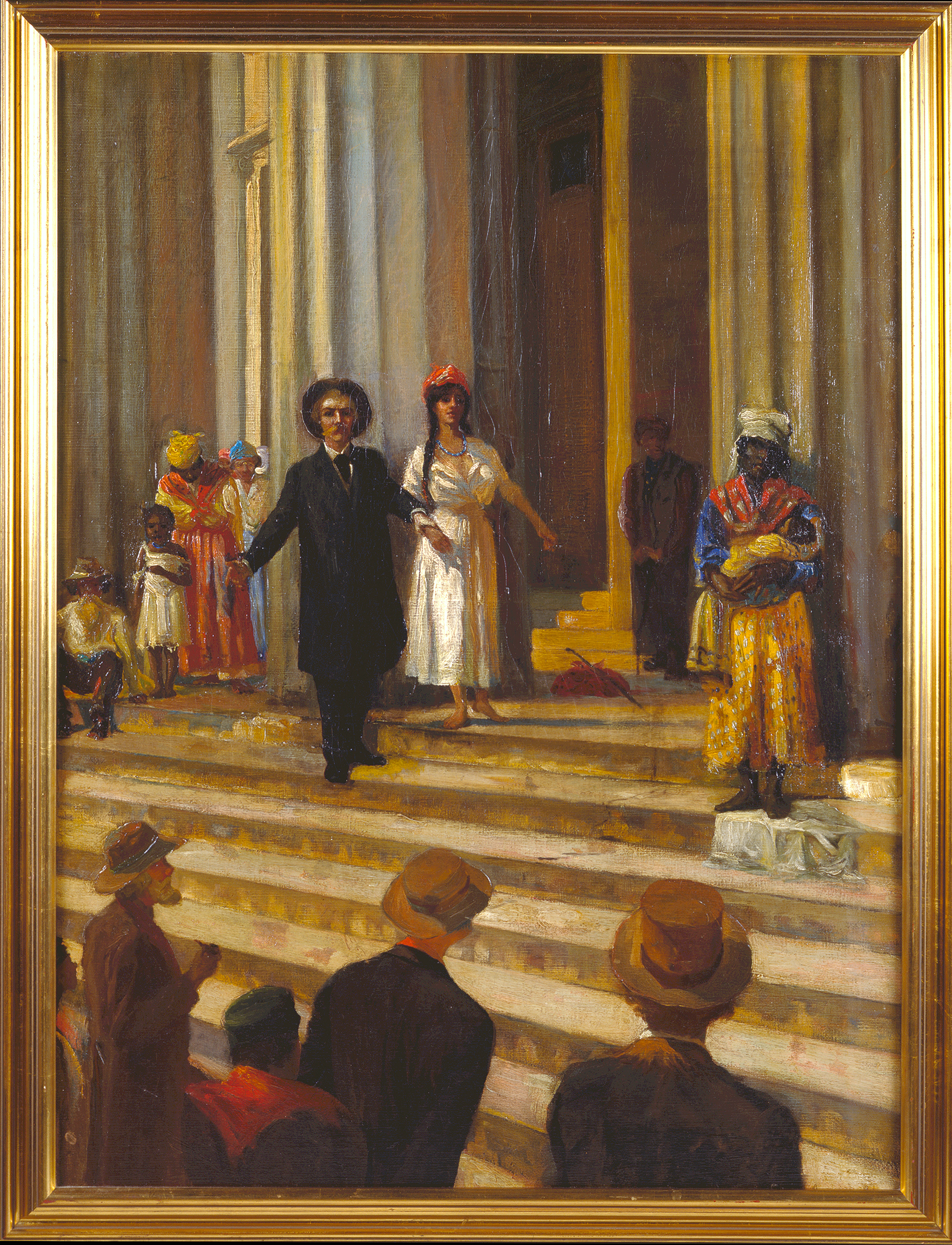
M. Hermandez Arevalo, Painting of a Slave Sale in St. Louis, 1908, based on a description from The Crisis,by the novelist Winston Churchill, Missouri History Museum

Anderson was an anti-slavery activist who provided loans to purchase the freedom of enslaved people, preventing them from being sold into the Deep South to work on cotton plantations. The Central Baptist Church acquired two of its deacons after Anderson bought them from the slave pen in St. Louis. They were Merriman Ramsey and Henry Lee. He helped African Americans file freedom suits in the courts. Anderson regularly carried baskets of food and other necessities for the poor and hungry.

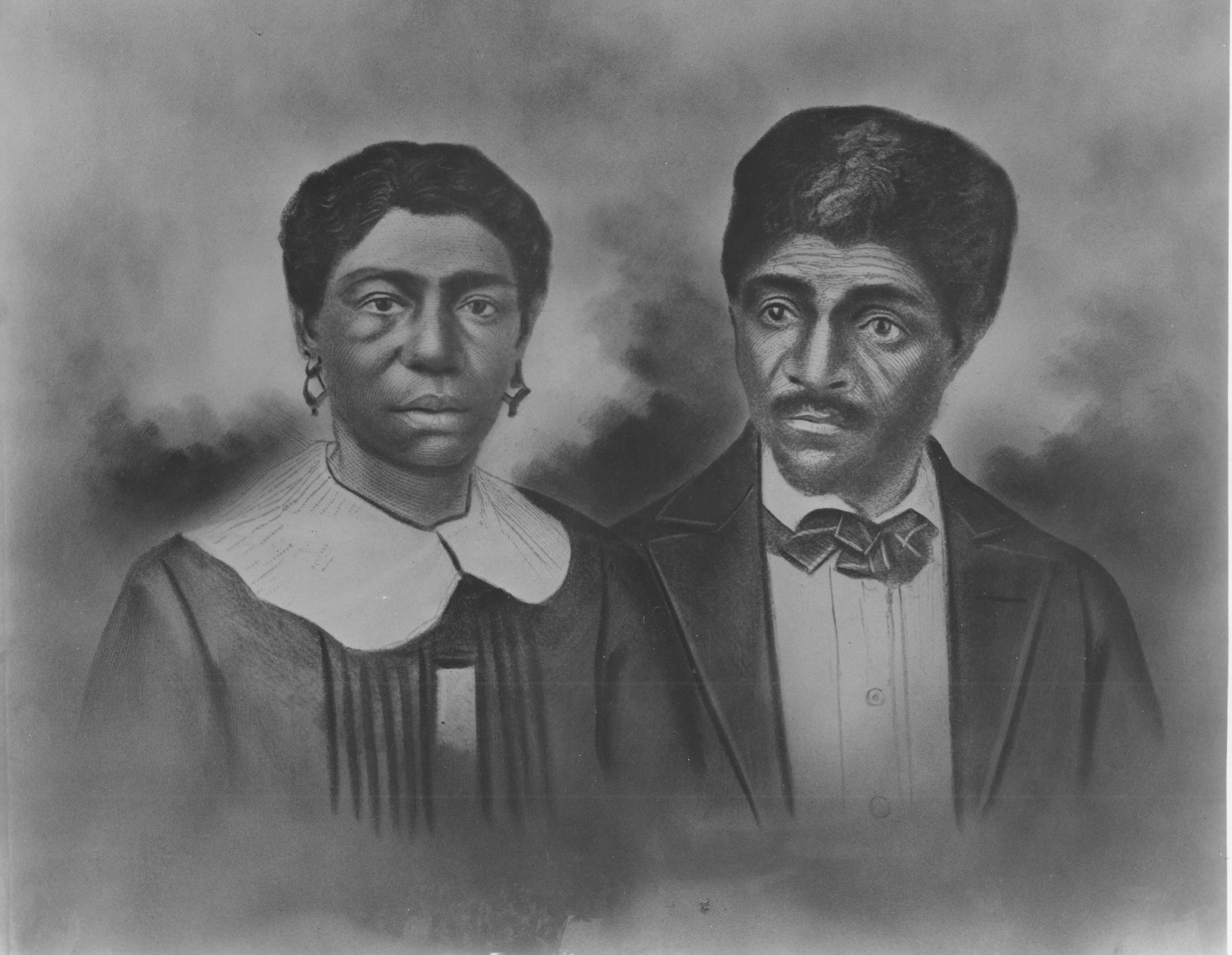
Dred and Harriet Robinson Scott, engraving from a photograph by John H. Fitzgibbon, Frank Leslie's Illustrated Newspaper, June 1857

Harriet Robinson Scott, a member of the Central Baptist Church, sought his advice for their freedom suit. (Note: Francis B. Murdoch prosecuted the case against the Alton rioters. Like Anderson, he moved from Alton to St. Louis and he knew Dred Scott and Harriet Robinson Scott of the later landmark Dred Scott v. Sandford Supreme Court case. Murdoch was one of the Scott's attorneys. Historians believe that Anderson introduced the Scotts to Murdoch.) Anderson was also a spiritual advisor to Harriet and her husband, Dred Scott.

After Meecham died in 1854, (Note: Anderson delivered his eulogy, "A Sermon of the Life, Character, and Death of Rev. John B. Meachum.") Anderson ran the Freedom School for African American children. With Galusha Anderson, a white Baptist minister, he lobbied the St. Louis school system for education for black children over a ten-year period. Anderson served on a board of education established to provide schooling for black students. It was the first and only board of its kind in the city. The ten members included three black ministers, two black businessmen, and three whites. A subscription school opened in 1856 that charged one dollar per pupil. By 1864, four public schools were established and there were also four subscription schools that operated out of the basements of black churches. This was accomplished during a period when the prevailing belief among pro-slavery and some anti-slavery factions that African Americans should not be educated. The St. Louis Board of Education petitioned the Legislature to enact laws to provide schools for African American children. A law was enacted in 1866 to provide funding for four or five public schools for $500 (equivalent to $10,293 in 2025).

== Fraternal life ==
He and Henry Mcghee Alexander became involved in Prince Hall Freemasonry during a trip to Boston (Note: H. McGee Alexander, the Grand Master for the state of Missouri, was an African American produce merchant who died in April 1868.) and was then a member of a local Masonic lodge in St. Louis. In the early 1860s, he co-founded the McGhee Lodge (H. McGee Lodge) in St. Louis. It was the first Prince Hall Masonic organization established west of the Mississippi River.

== Personal life ==
Anderson met Nancy Barton in Alton, and was married to her on November 9, 1838, in Madison, Illinois. They had five children: Mandy J., Simon P., May E., Matilda, and Martha Anderson. His son, Simon Peter Anderson was also a pastor of the Central Baptist Church, serving from 1868 to 1880 and 1885–1889.

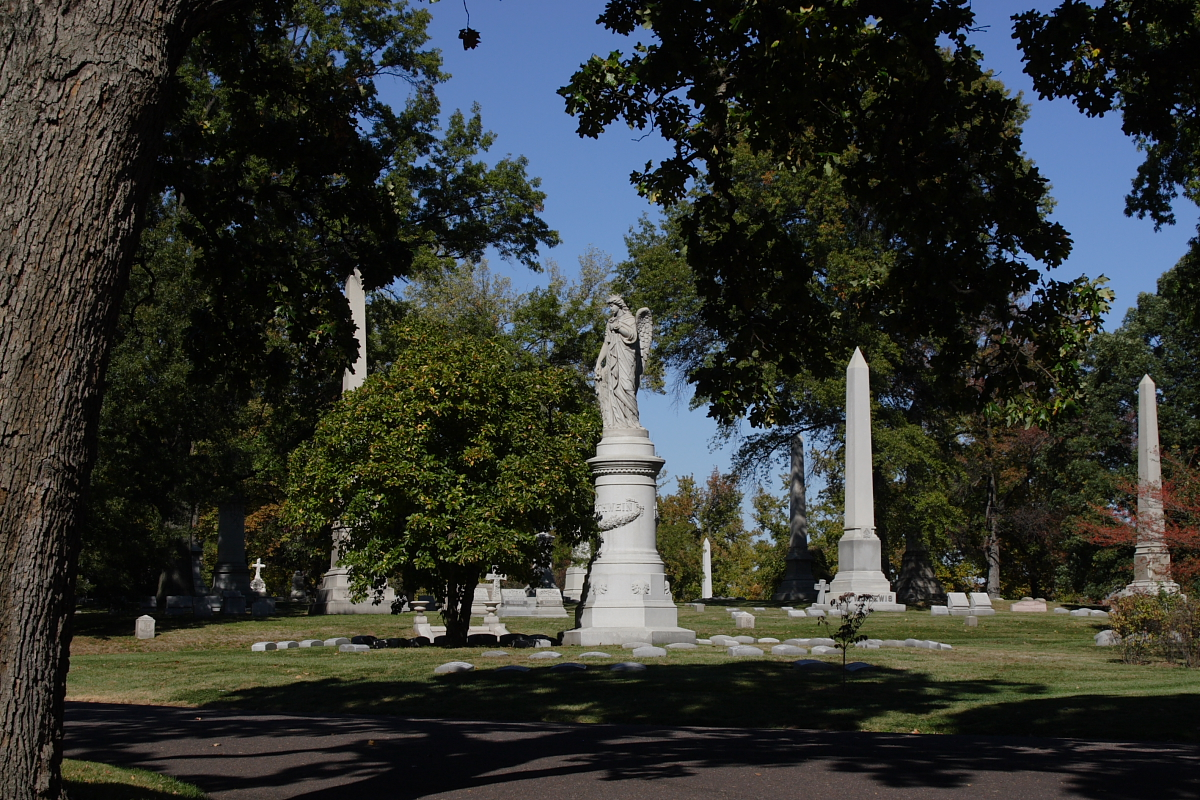
Bellefontaine Cemetery, St. Louis, Missouri

He died of poisoning after a druggist accidentally made medicine for him from the root of a plant, rather than the leaf. He died on May 20, 1863, and was buried in the Bellefontaine Cemetery next to John Berry Meachum. (Note: Elisha Parish Lovejoy was also buried at the Bellefontaine Cemetery.) A historical marker at the cemetery memorializes his efforts to provide education for African Americans and in recognition for his efforts as a minister and a community leader.

== Bibliography ==
- Wright, John Aaron (2002). Discovering African American St. Louis: A Guide to Historic Sites. Missouri History Museum. ISBN 978-1-883982-45-4.
