= First Baptist Church City of St. Louis =

- First Baptist Church City of St. Louis
- 38°38′26″N 90°13′21″W
- Location: 3100 Bell Avenue, St. Louis, Missouri
- Country: United States
- Denomination: Baptist
- Website: www.firstbaptistchurchstlouis.org

History
- Former name: First African Baptist Church
- Status: Church
- Founded: 1817
- Founder: John Berry Meachum

Architecture
- Functional status: Active
- Years built: 1917

First Baptist Church City of St. Louis is a Baptist church located in Midtown St. Louis at 3100 Bell Avenue in St. Louis. It is affiliated with the National Baptist Convention, USA.

== History ==
The First African Baptist Church had its beginnings in 1817, when two Baptist missionaries, John Mason Peck and James Welch, established the Sabbath School for Negroes in St. Louis, (Note: Clio and Wright state that the services began in 1818. Duncan states that the church was founded in March 1818. The church states that it was founded in 1817; it celebrated its 200-year anniversary in 2017.) with the assistance of John Berry Meachum. Meachum began preaching and assisting the missionaries in 1821. Peck provided guidance and supervision during monthly visits.

Meachum, ordained by Peck in 1825, founded the First African Baptist Church in 1827. It was then independent of the missionaries. The church, described as a "plain and comfortable brick house for worship", was located at Third and Almond (now Market) Street. It was the first African-American church west of the Mississippi River. An ordinance was passed in 1825 that made it illegal for African Americans to assemble, unless they had a permit and the events were attended by a police officer. The church required enslaved people to have permission of their owners to attend the church, which eased the concerns of many influential community members.

It was founded as First African Baptist Church in 1827. It was the first African-American church west of the Mississippi River. Initially, most of the congregants were African American enslaved people who had permission from their owners to attend church. From its beginning, the church offered reading and religious education clandestinely. The city of St. Louis enacted laws to restrict assembly, education, and religious services for black people.

While he was transparent about who might attend church services, Meachum secretly operated a school for blacks in the basement of the church called the Tallow Candle School. It taught reading and Biblical scriptures and also provided a worship service. The school admitted all people who wished to receive an education, and it charged a monthly tuition of one dollar per pupil for those who could afford to pay. Some of the pupils chose to be baptized and become members of the church.

The congregation grew from 14 people at its founding to 220 people by 1829. Two hundred of the parishioners were slaves, who could only travel to the church and attend services with the permission of their owners. The church was a stopping point on the Underground Railroad.

The church grew to more than 500 people by the 1840s. On March 22, 1846, 22 or 23 of its members were released from the church and founded the Second Colored Baptist Church (now the Central Baptist Church). In most cases, the founding members had moved west of the church and desired a location closer to their homes.

In 1847, the school was closed by the police. Meachum then opened the Floating Freedom School on a steamboat on the Mississippi River. Since it was anchored in the Mississippi River, it was under the jurisdiction of the federal government and not subject to the Missouri laws and ordinances.

A larger church was built between Fourth and Fifth Street in 1848. (Note: Wright states that the church was located at Fourteenth and Clark.) Meachum died while delivering a sermon in 1854. The St. Louis Post-Dispatch reported in 1874, that the church numbered 3,600 with 30 deacons. On the second Sunday in May of that year, 125 baptisms were performed by Mr. Holmes, a former enslaved man who was emancipated after the end of the Civil War. People who wished to become members first met with the church's membership committee for their neighborhood, and if approved, they then met with the pastor, followed by a vote being taken of the members.

A second building was constructed next to the church in 1952 for educational and recreational facilities, including a combination gymnasium and auditorium for up to 3,000 people. In 1997, the church partnered with the St. Louis Symphony Orchestra's IN UNISON choral ensemble program.

The church moved to its current location in Midtown St. Louis in 1917. In 1940, a fire destroyed the church, which was rebuilt over the following 13 months.

In 1952, a separate two-story building was constructed for education and recreational facilities, including 10 classrooms, a combination auditorium and gymnasium for up to 3,000 people, and recreation rooms. In 1997, the church partnered with the St. Louis Symphony Orchestra's IN UNISON choral ensemble program. A history museum is located in the basement of the church.
