= Harriet Robinson Scott =

African American abolitionist wife of Dred Scott (c. 1820–1876)

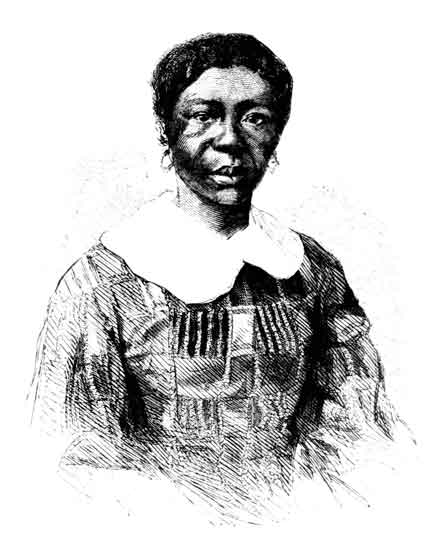
- Scott in 1857
- Born: Harriet Robinson c. 1820; Virginia, U.S.
- Died: June 17, 1876 (aged c. 56); Missouri, U.S.
- Resting place: Greenwood Cemetery
- Occupation: Laundress
- Known for: Dred Scott v. Sandford; Harriet v. Irene Emerson
- Spouse: Dred Scott (m. 1836; died 1858)
- Children: Eliza Scott; Lizzie Scott

Harriet Robinson Scott (c. 1820 – June 17, 1876) was an African American woman who fought for her freedom alongside her husband, Dred Scott, for eleven years. Their legal battle culminated in the infamous United States Supreme Court decision Dred Scott v. Sandford in 1857. On April 6, 1846, attorney Francis B. Murdoch had initiated Harriet v. Irene Emerson in the Circuit Court of St. Louis County, making the Scotts the first and only married couple to file separate freedom suits in tandem.

Born into slavery in Virginia, Harriet Robinson lived briefly in the free state of Pennsylvania before being taken to the Northwest Territory by Indian agent and slaveholder Lawrence Taliaferro. In 1836 or 1837, Harriet married Etheldred, an enslaved man who had been brought to Fort Snelling in present-day Minnesota by Dr. John Emerson, a military surgeon. Their civil wedding ceremony was officiated by justice of the peace Taliaferro, who never actually sold Harriet to Dr. Emerson, since slavery was illegal there.

In 1838, she gave birth to their first child on the steamboat Gipsey as it traveled north on the Mississippi River, in free territory, back to Fort Snelling. In 1840, the Scott family moved to St. Louis in the slave state of Missouri with Irene Emerson, who eventually hired them out to her brother-in-law, Captain Henry Bainbridge, at Jefferson Barracks. After Dr. Emerson's death in 1843, Dred accompanied Captain Bainbridge to Louisiana and Texas, leaving Harriet and their two daughters behind in St. Louis. Harriet was hired out to Adeline Russell, wife of grocery wholesaler Samuel Russell, most likely working as a laundress.

In 1846, Dred Scott returned to St. Louis and tried to purchase his freedom from Mrs. Emerson, who refused. The Scotts then decided to pursue their freedom through the courts. By then, Harriet, a member of the Second African Baptist Church, was aware of the many freedom suits that had been won by enslaved women in St. Louis.

Based on legal precedents set by Winny v. Whitesides in 1824 and Rachel v. Walker in 1836, the Scotts had a strong case and should have won easily. After losing their first trial in 1847 on a technicality, the Scotts were granted a new trial, but were taken into custody by the sheriff on the orders of Mrs. Emerson, to be hired out by him while their cases were still pending. Dred Scott won his second trial in the state court in 1850, briefly winning freedom for his family, but Mrs. Emerson appealed. Lawyers for both sides then agreed to advance only Dred's case with the understanding that the outcome of his case would apply to Harriet's suit as well. Legal historians have argued that this was an error on the part of the Scotts' lawyers, as Harriet's claim to freedom was stronger than that of Dred, and the legal status of children was determined by the status of their mother. As their case progressed through the Missouri Supreme Court, the United States Circuit Court for the District of Missouri, and the Supreme Court of the United States, it became clear that the courts would no longer uphold legal precedent.

On March 6, 1857, the United States Supreme Court led by Chief Justice Roger Taney ruled that the Scotts were not American citizens due to their race, and therefore had no legal rights. It also declared the Northwest Ordinance of 1787 and the Missouri Compromise unconstitutional. Although they failed to win their freedom through the courts, the Scotts were finally emancipated on May 26, 1857, after nationwide media coverage of their high-profile loss caused public embarrassment to Massachusetts Congressman Calvin C. Chaffee, an abolitionist who had married Eliza Irene Sanford Emerson. The Supreme Court ruling ultimately triggered a constitutional crisis, rallied abolitionists, and set the stage for the events leading to the American Civil War, the emancipation of enslaved African Americans, and the Thirteenth, Fourteenth, and Fifteenth Amendments to the U.S. Constitution.

Dred Scott died in 1858, but Harriet survived the Civil War and lived out her days in the company of their two daughters, as well as their grandchildren who had been born into freedom.

The Harriet Scott Memorial Pavilion at Greenwood Cemetery in Hillsdale, Missouri is dedicated to her memory. The Dred and Harriet Scott Statue at the Old Courthouse in St. Louis commemorates where their quest for freedom began.

== Early life ==
Harriet Robinson was born into slavery around 1820 in Virginia, after which she lived briefly in Pennsylvania. Details of her early life are largely unknown.

Her first-known slaveholder was Major Lawrence Taliaferro, who was originally from Virginia. Taliaferro was said to have "inherited" Harriet rather than purchased her. The name Robinson may have come from the family that enslaved her mother. There was a Robinson family living near the home where Lawrence Taliaferro had grown up in King George County, Virginia, but there is no known record connecting them to Harriet.

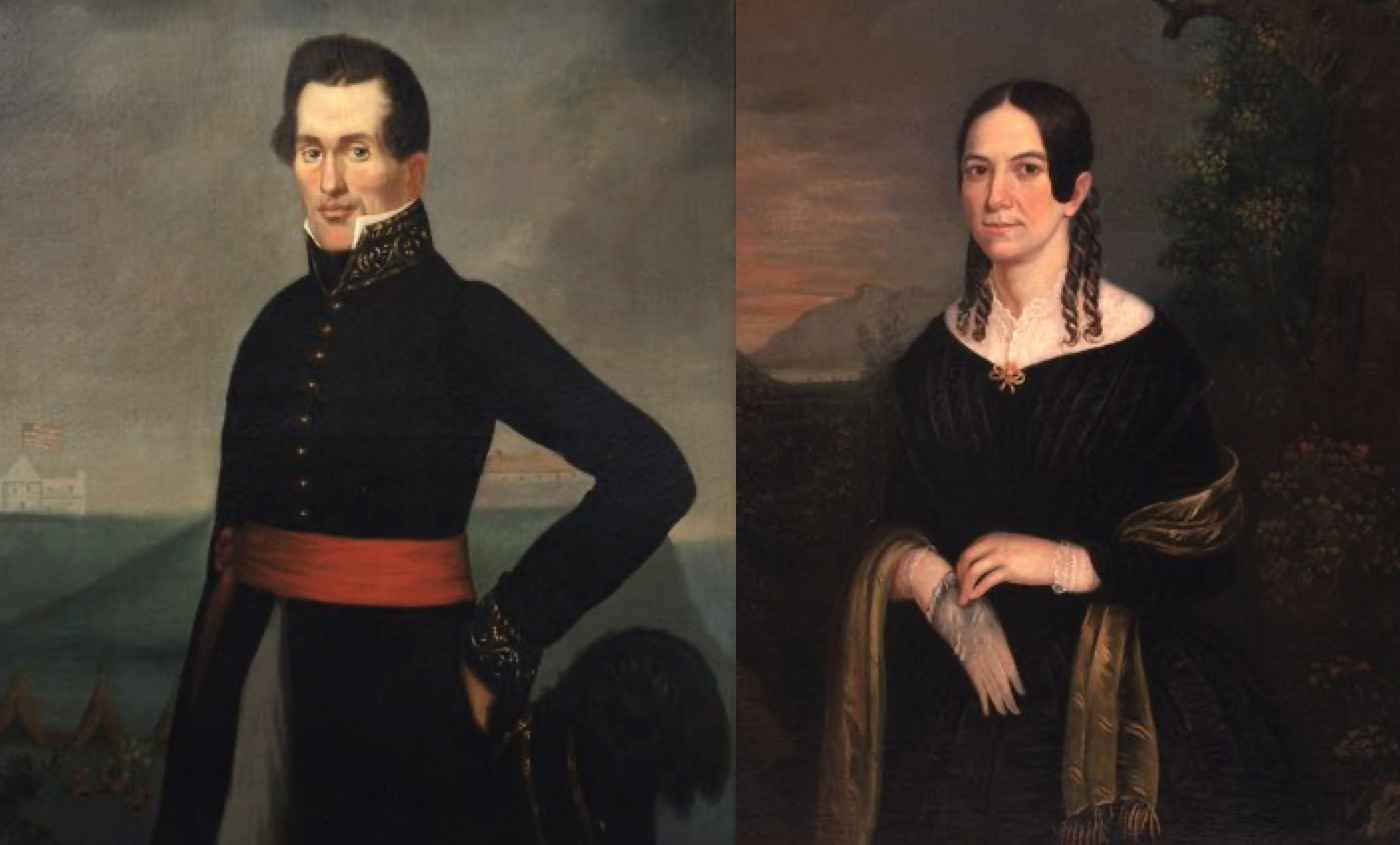
Lawrence Taliaferro and Eliza Dillon Taliaferro (c. 1835)

Another possible explanation is that Harriet may have been given to Taliaferro and his wife, Elizabeth Dillon, as part of a wedding dowry when they married in 1828. Known as "Eliza", Taliaferro's wife was the daughter of Humphrey Dillon, an innkeeper in Bedford, Pennsylvania. Her father had registered three children as slaves in the 1820s, including two daughters and one son of an enslaved female servant named Eliza Diggs. Although Pennsylvania law freed all slaves' children born within the state and any enslaved person kept in the state for longer than six months, local custom allowed slaveholders to register the children of enslaved mothers for slave status until the age of 28.

While living in Pennsylvania, Harriet was likely trained as a laundress or chambermaid at the inn owned by the Dillon family, possibly by her own mother. Harriet never learned to read or write.

== Move to Minnesota country ==
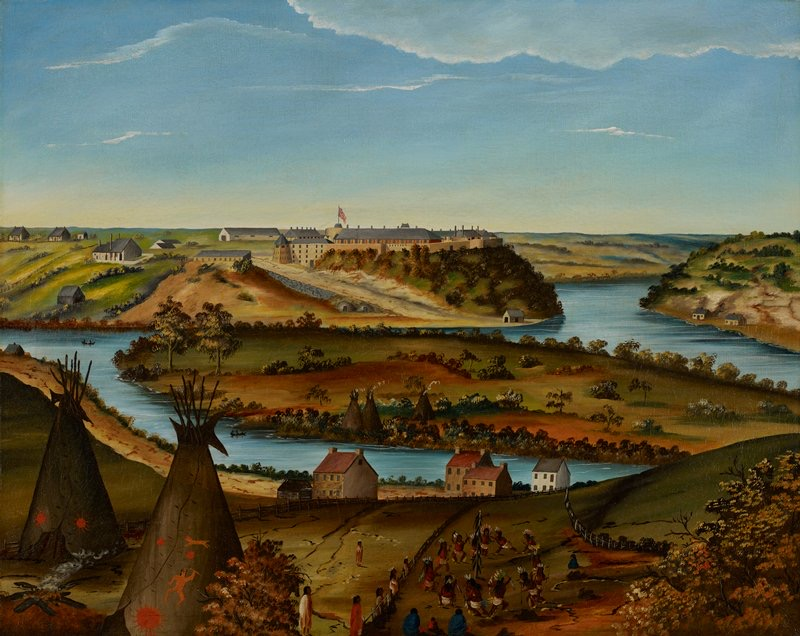
St. Peter's Agency house (left in white fence) near Fort Snelling above the joining of the Mississippi and Minnesota Rivers (c.1850)

In 1835, Lawrence Taliaferro moved his entire household to join him at St. Peter's Indian Agency near Fort Snelling in present-day Minnesota. He had lived and worked there since 1820 as the Indian agent to the Dakota as well as the Ojibwe, and had been reappointed for another term by President Andrew Jackson.

Fourteen-year-old Harriet was taken along as a servant to work at the Taliaferros' agency house. Harriet likely made the six-week journey from Bedford, Pennsylvania, along with Lawrence and Eliza Taliaferro, Taliaferro's brother-in-law Horatio Dillon, an 18-year-old servant also named Eliza, and a few enslaved men. They traveled from western Pennsylvania to St. Louis, Missouri, where they took the steamboat Warrior up the Upper Mississippi River to St. Peter's Agency.

=== Slavery at Fort Snelling ===
Taliaferro had taken black servants to Minnesota country as slaves starting in 1825. Over the years, he became the largest slaveholder in the area. He enslaved at least 21 black servants over his lifetime. Taliaferro hired many of them out to officers at Fort Snelling, and kept a few servants in the agency house, which was located about half a mile outside the walls of the fort.

Although Article VI of the Northwest Ordinance of 1787 had banned slavery north of the Ohio River, it continued in the region for decades. Furthermore, slave labor on United States military installations was often tolerated or even encouraged prior to the Civil War. At Fort Snelling, United States Army officers received a stipend to pay for servants, but often used enslaved labor instead, keeping the extra money for themselves. Throughout the 1820s and 1830s, there were an estimated 15 to 30 enslaved men and women working at Fort Snelling at any given time.

== Life at St. Peter's Agency ==
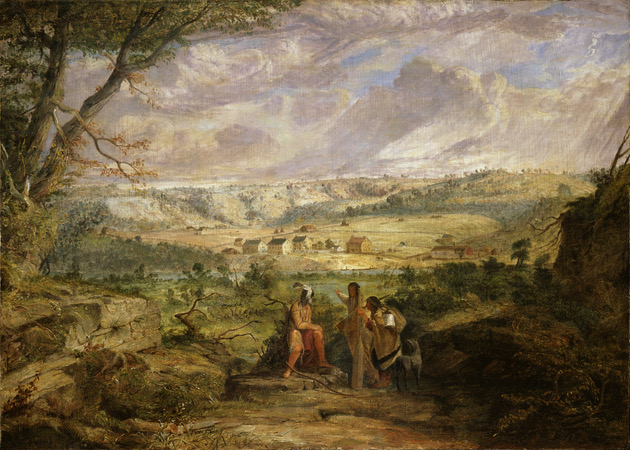
View from Fort Snelling looking across the Minnesota River toward Mendota (1848)

While living at the Indian agency house, Harriet Robinson and Eliza were expected to keep Mrs. Taliaferro living comfortably and to cushion her from the harsh living conditions of the Minnesota "frontier." Lawrence Taliaferro had a young part-Dakota daughter named Mary who had been born in 1828, shortly before his marriage to Elizabeth Dillon, but it is unclear whether Mary Taliaferro ever lived with them.

The agency house was in poor repair and small compared to the Taliaferros' grand home in Pennsylvania. The stone house offered inadequate protection from the cold winter climate, contributing to Mrs. Taliaferro's frequent illnesses. Nevertheless, Harriet enjoyed a more comfortable lifestyle compared to many of the poorer settlement families living nearby in cabins and shanties. Historian Lea VanderVelde writes, "If any kitchen in the area had a cookstove, butterchurns, a mangle for squeezing the water from laundry, and even a complete set of kitchen utensils it would have been the Taliaferro household."

At the time, the Dakota and Ojibwe population vastly outnumbered the white settlers in Minnesota country, and there was frequent intermarriage, making race relations there more "fluid" than in other parts of the United States. The absence of a cash crop economy also meant that enslaved blacks were generally able to exercise more freedoms than in the plantation South.

=== Household responsibilities ===
As maid servants, Harriet and Eliza were responsible for grooming their mistress – helping Mrs. Taliaferro with her hair and dress each day – in addition to their household chores. Each night, they slept in the basement kitchen on a pallet of rags set out in front of the open fire. At dawn, they tended the fire to warm the house.

During the winters, Harriet was likely tasked with building and tending fires all day long. The winters were so cold that laundry "would never dry but simply freeze stiff." For most of the winter, it meant that Harriet was free from the task of doing laundry. During the rest of the year, the settlement community regarded clean clothing and bathing with soap as evidence of their "superiority" over the local Native American tribes.

At dinner, the servant women would serve food in the Taliaferros' dining room, taking it from the basement, up the stairs into the outdoors, around the back, and into the main house through the back door. As an innkeeper's daughter, Mrs. Taliaferro received many compliments from guests about her elegant table settings and how well she organized her household.

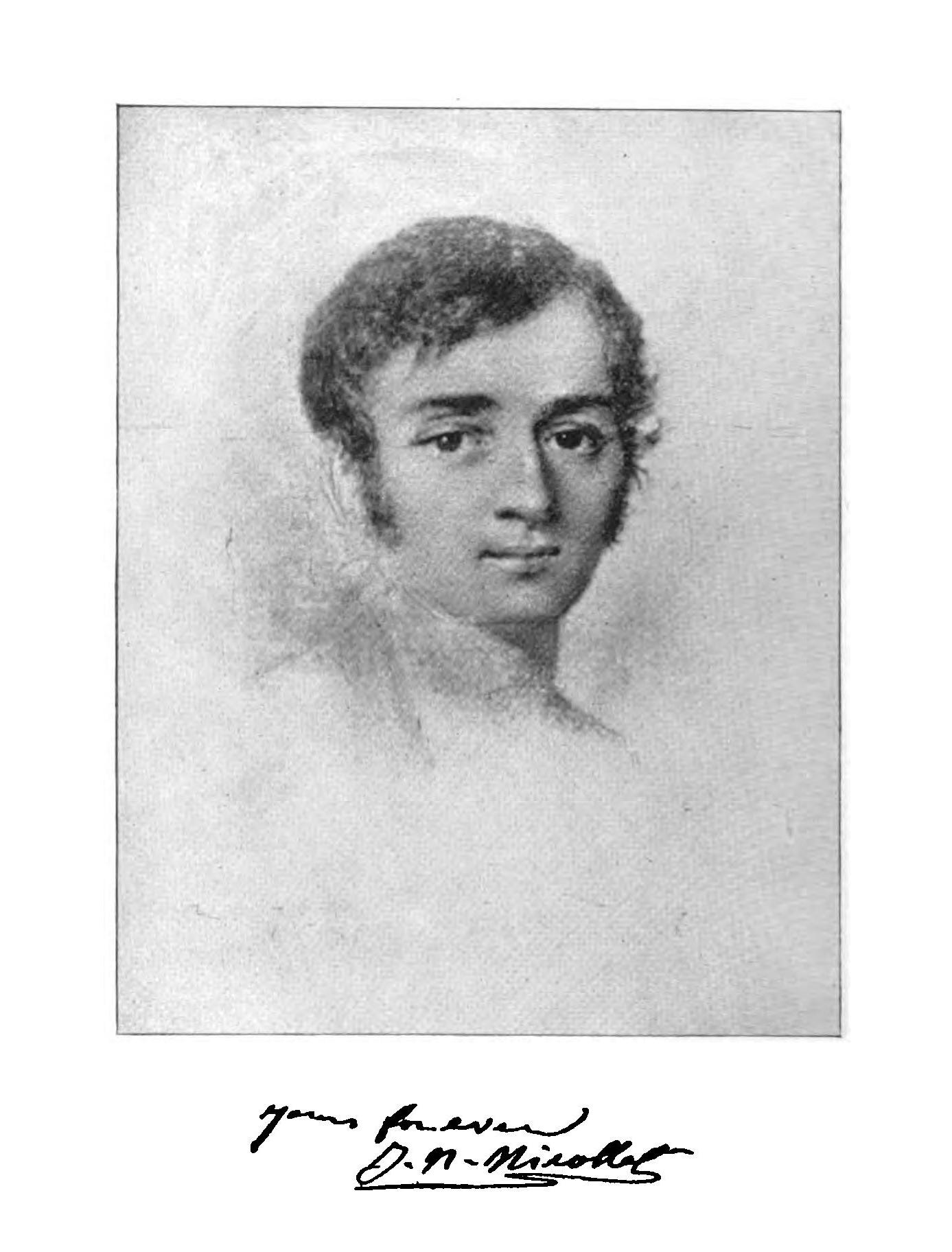
Geographer Joseph Nicollet stayed with the Taliaferros

==== Notable guests and visitors ====
In Mrs. Dred Scott: A Life on Slavery's Frontier (2009), Lea VanderVelde suggests that Harriet Robinson served dinner to several notable visitors while at the St. Peter's Agency house. Among the Taliaferros' dinner guests between 1835 and 1836 were "mixed-blood" fur trader Joseph Renville of Lac qui Parle; painter George Catlin, who stayed at Fort Snelling with his wife Clara while completing his Indian portraits; and British geologist George William Featherstonhaugh. Explorer Joseph Nicollet stayed with the Taliaferros for a while during the winter of 1836 and became very close to Mrs. Taliaferro, later referring to her as his "sister."

Harriet probably answered the front door to greet Dakota and Ojibwe visitors to the Indian agency. VanderVelde suggests that she got to know many of them by name, particularly if they were from nearby bands. Twenty-four-year-old Henry Hastings Sibley, the new regional manager for American Fur Company, also became a frequent visitor to the Indian agency; Taliaferro soon came to view Sibley as his "nemesis."

== Marriage to Dred Scott ==
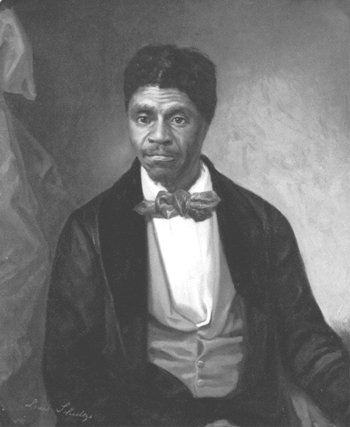
Dred Scott

On May 8, 1836, Dred Scott arrived at Fort Snelling by steamboat. He was one of at least five enslaved men who arrived that day with 140 members of the 5th Infantry Regiment. At the time, he was known simply as "Etheldred." He was a personal servant to John Emerson, a military surgeon who had acquired him as a slave in St. Louis, Missouri before taking up his first official post at Fort Armstrong in the supposedly free state of Illinois.

In the months that followed, Dr. Emerson and Agent Taliaferro established a collegial working relationship. In late June 1836, they worked together to vaccinate nearly 1,000 Dakota men, women and children against smallpox, and were probably assisted by Etheldred. Emerson finally called on Taliaferro at the agency house for the first time on July 3.

Historian Lea VanderVelde suggests that Harriet and Dred became acquainted with each other prior to this, perhaps while Harriet was tending the agency garden and Dred was on the prairie plateau looking after Dr. Emerson's horse. They would have also seen each other and had time to talk when Harriet was ordering and waiting for items at the sutler's store, just inside the gate and across from the fort hospital.

=== Civil wedding ceremony ===
Harriet Robinson and Dred Scott were married in a civil ceremony officiated by Lawrence Taliaferro as justice of the peace, in 1836 or 1837. Harriet was about seventeen and Dred was about forty years old. It was the second marriage for Dred.

The exact date of the wedding is not recorded. No journal entries exist for Taliaferro in 1837; he had reportedly run very low on paper and stationery. Their marriage was the final one of many officiated by Taliaferro during his time as Indian agent in pre-territorial Minnesota.

Civil wedding ceremonies were unusual at the time for enslaved couples. As Indian agent, Taliaferro was a strong believer in Western-style marriages and their "civilizing" effect on families on the "frontier," whether they were Native Americans, fur traders, soldiers, or other settlers.

=== Move to Fort Snelling ===
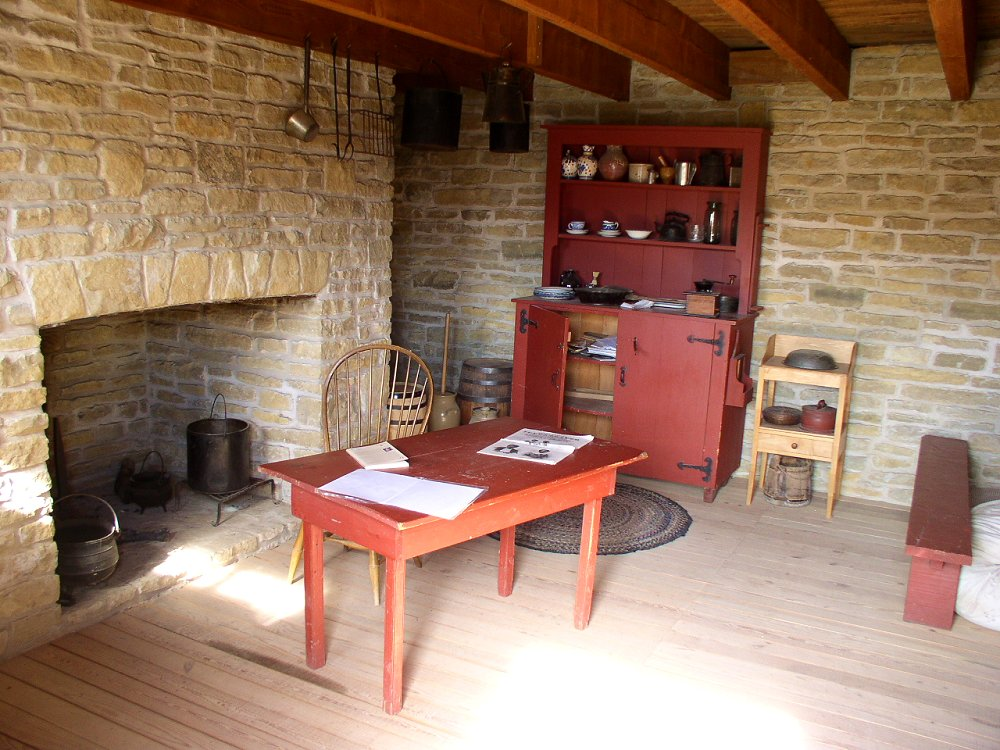
Harriet and Dred's restored living quarters at Historic Fort Snelling

Once they were married, Harriet left St. Peter's Agency and went to live with Dred at Fort Snelling. Officers at the fort referred to her in their records as "Har.Etheldred" or "H.Dread."

By September 14, 1837, Harriet was already married to Dred, and John Emerson was her enslaver. On that date, she was hired out by Dr. Emerson to Lieutenant James L. Thompson, 5th Infantry, and his wife Catherine, who later testified in the Scotts' trial as a witness to their residence at Fort Snelling.

That fall, Harriet was the only servant woman remaining at Fort Snelling and her housekeeping services were in high demand. She was hired out to as many as three officers before being hired exclusively to the post commandant, Major Joseph Plympton, in November. Taliaferro had previously hired his servant Eliza out to Plympton, and now Plympton paid Dr. Emerson for Harriet's services.

==== Dr. Emerson's departure ====
Around this time, Dr. Emerson had been granted a reassignment to St. Louis – a move he had requested – but was required to wait until the arrival of his replacement. He was unable to leave until October 20, 1837, when freezing conditions on the Mississippi meant that he had to make the journey by canoe rather than by steamboat, and leave most of his personal property behind. Emerson left Harriet and Dred behind at Fort Snelling for the winter, hiring them out to other officers while collecting payment for their services. After reaching St. Louis, Emerson was quickly transferred again, this time to Fort Jesup in Louisiana.

=== Legal implications ===
Although Harriet stated in her 1846 lawsuit that Taliaferro "sold" her to Emerson, there is no record of an actual sale. Legal historian Walter Ehrlich writes that instead, what appears to have happened is that Harriet and Dred agreed with Taliaferro and Emerson to be legally married, and that Taliaferro informally transferred his ownership of Harriet to Emerson. In his 1864 autobiography, Taliaferro would write that he had officiated the "union of Dred Scott with Harriet Robinson – my servant girl which I gave him."

Taliaferro, however, was possibly uncertain about Harriet's actual status when he officiated her wedding to Dred. Around the same time that his autobiography was published, Taliaferro gave a newspaper interview in which he referred to "marrying the two and giving the girl her freedom." Even if that had been his intention, he did not document her manumission, and in practice, the Scotts remained enslaved by Emerson.

==== Rachel v. Walker (1836) ====
In June 1836, before Harriet and Dred married, an important freedom suit, Rachel v. Walker, had been decided in the Missouri Supreme Court. Rachel was an enslaved woman who had been acquired by Colonel J. B. W. Stockton in St. Louis and taken to Fort Snelling, where she lived from 1830 to 1831. Stockton then took Rachel to Fort Crawford in Michigan. The Missouri Supreme Court unanimously upheld Rachel's claim to freedom, ruling that she had become free when the army officer had taken her to reside in free territory.

== Birth of Eliza ==
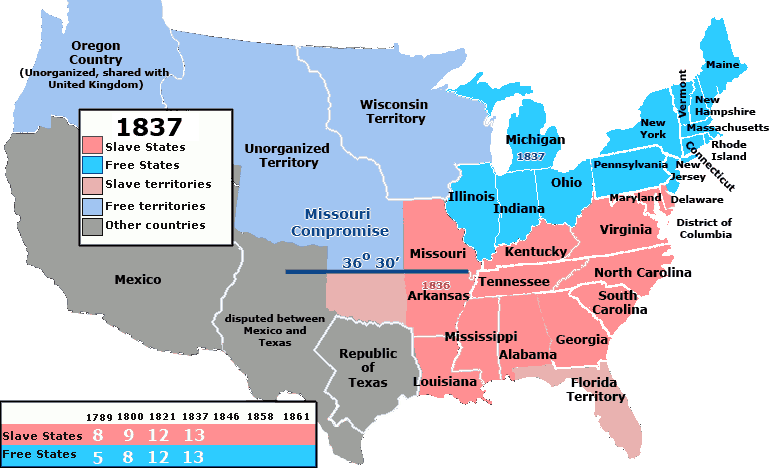
Map of "free states" (blue) and "slave states" (red) in the United States as of 1837. Eliza Scott was born north of Missouri and hence in "free territory."

In the fall of 1838, Harriet Scott gave birth to her first child, a baby girl named Eliza. She gave birth while on board a steamboat heading north up the Mississippi River from St. Louis back to Fort Snelling. Eliza Scott was born north of Missouri, meaning she had been born in free territory according to the Missouri Compromise. The circumstances surrounding Eliza's birth came about after Dred's enslaver, Dr. John Emerson, kept changing his mind about where he wanted to live.

=== Summoned to Louisiana ===
On November 22, 1837, Dr. Emerson had reported to Fort Jesup in Louisiana, and almost immediately began complaining about the effects of the climate on his health. He sent numerous requests to the Surgeon General for another reassignment, preferably closer to Illinois, where he hoped to secure his land claims near Fort Armstrong. While in Louisiana, John Emerson was introduced to Eliza Irene Sanford, who was visiting from St. Louis. She was the sister-in-law of Captain Henry Bainbridge, who was also from St. Louis. On February 6, 1838, John and Irene were married in Louisiana.

Shortly thereafter, Dr. Emerson sent for the Scotts to join him and his new wife in Louisiana, a slave state. Harriet and Dred left Fort Snelling in April 1838, most likely on the first steamboat after the spring thaw. Harriet was in the early stages of pregnancy.

Little is known about Harriet and Dred's journey south. In the summer of 1838, Emerson wrote in a letter that "Even one of my negroes in St. Louis has sued me for his freedom." There is no record of an actual lawsuit at this time, but VanderVelde suggests that once they reached St. Louis, the Scotts may have had second thoughts about continuing on to Louisiana and somehow conveyed their hesitation to Dr. Emerson.

=== Journey back to Fort Snelling ===
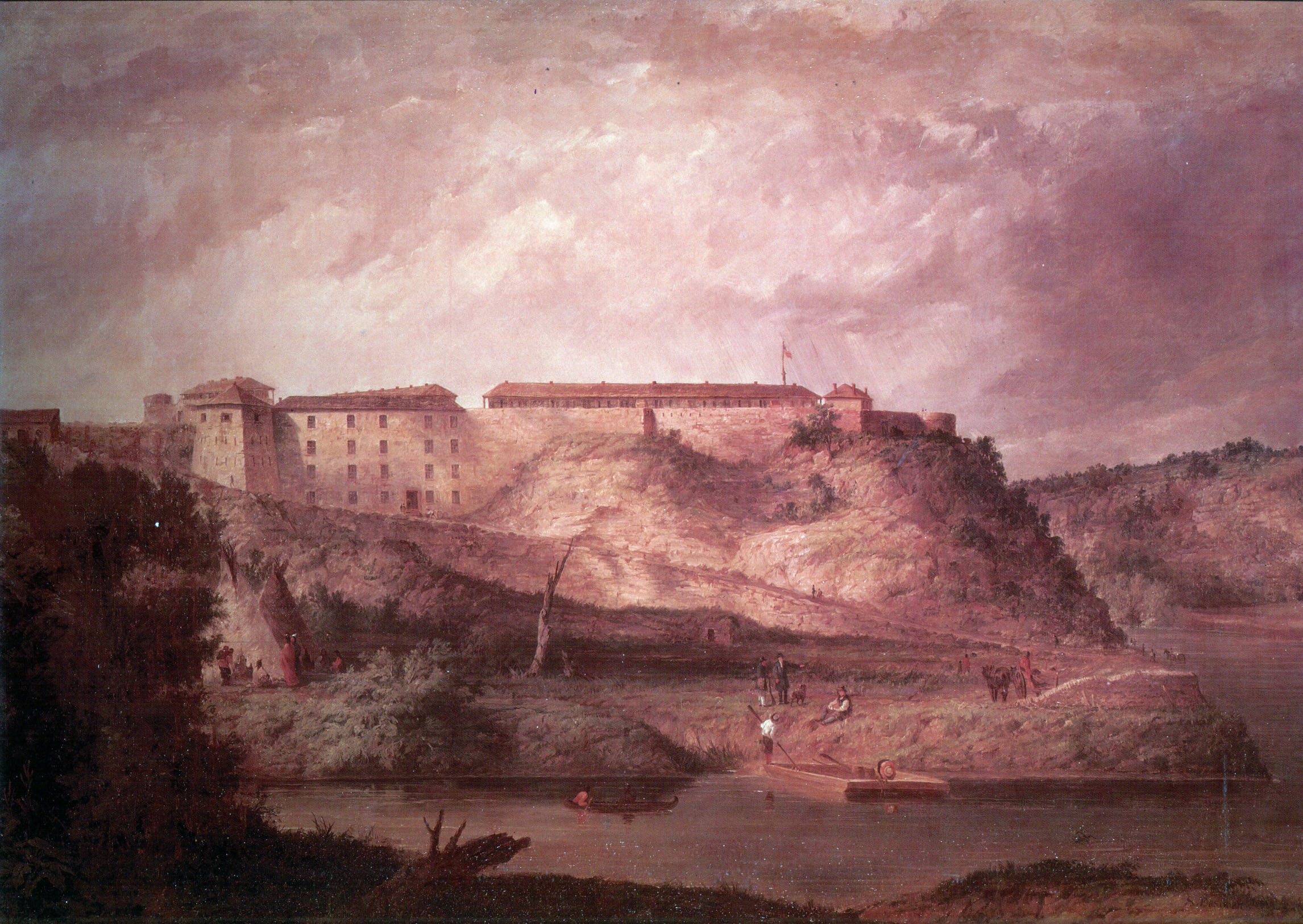
Fort Snelling (painting by Seth Eastman)

After months of complaining, Dr. Emerson managed to secure a transfer back to Fort Snelling. On September 26, 1838, Harriet and Dred Scott were on board the steamboat Gipsey, together with Dr. and Mrs. Emerson, as it departed St. Louis.

By then, Harriet was heavily pregnant. She was probably very uncomfortable, as the Gipsey was a small and cramped steamer – "more of a tugboat than a pleasure ship." Small boats like the Gipsey were notorious for the extreme heat generated from their wood furnaces and steam engines. The sternwheeler had no private cabins and only two group cabins – one for ladies and the other for gentlemen. Harriet may have had to go below deck and try to find "a secluded corner" where she could give birth, "behind the barrels of cargo and bales of blankets destined for the Indians."

In Dred Scott v. Sandford, Eliza Scott's birthplace would be described as "on board the Steamboat Gipsy north of the north line of the State of Missouri & upon the River Mississippi." The geographic location of her birth became a critical point in their freedom suit, and Dred and Harriet would call on the captain of the ship as a witness. Methodist missionary Reverend Alfred Brunson, who was also on board the Gipsey, would later mention Eliza's birth in his autobiography.

The trip was very slow due to low water levels on the Mississippi River. The Gipsey finally reached Fort Snelling on October 21, 1838.

==== Naming the baby ====
Although many have assumed that Eliza Scott was named after Eliza Irene Sanford Emerson, in fact, Mrs. Emerson went by her middle name, Irene. Eliza was also the first name of Eliza Dillon Taliaferro, as well as Harriet's friend and fellow servant, Eliza. Historian VanderVelde suggests that Harriet named her daughter after the last of these—her friend, the Taliaferro's servant.

=== Life as a new mother ===
Dr. Emerson would remain on his second tour of duty at Fort Snelling from October 1838 to May 1840. During this time, the Scott family probably lived once again in the basement of the fort hospital. They settled back in to life at the fort, where Harriet and Dred continued to work for Dr. and Mrs. Emerson, as well as other officers. By the time they returned to Fort Snelling, many of Harriet's old friends had left, and there were very few ladies and domestic servants remaining at the fort during baby Eliza's first winter.

Life at the fort had also become more difficult, as the officers struggled to maintain military discipline due to widespread drunkenness and a growing number of deserters. In 1839, Emerson became embroiled in an argument when the Fort Snelling quartermaster, Lieutenant McPhail, agreed to provide the Emersons with a stove, but refused to provide a second stove for the Scott family to use. Lieutenant McPhail punched Dr. Emerson in the nose and broke his glasses, after which Emerson challenged McPhail to a duel. Emerson was briefly arrested but not reprimanded, and appears to have prevailed, as the sutler's records show that Emerson was charged for two stoves. VanderVelde notes that stoves were generally only available to officers and enlisted men with wives, and that the fact that Dr. Emerson fought for a stove for the Scott family suggests that he did try to protect and provide for them.

== Move to Missouri ==
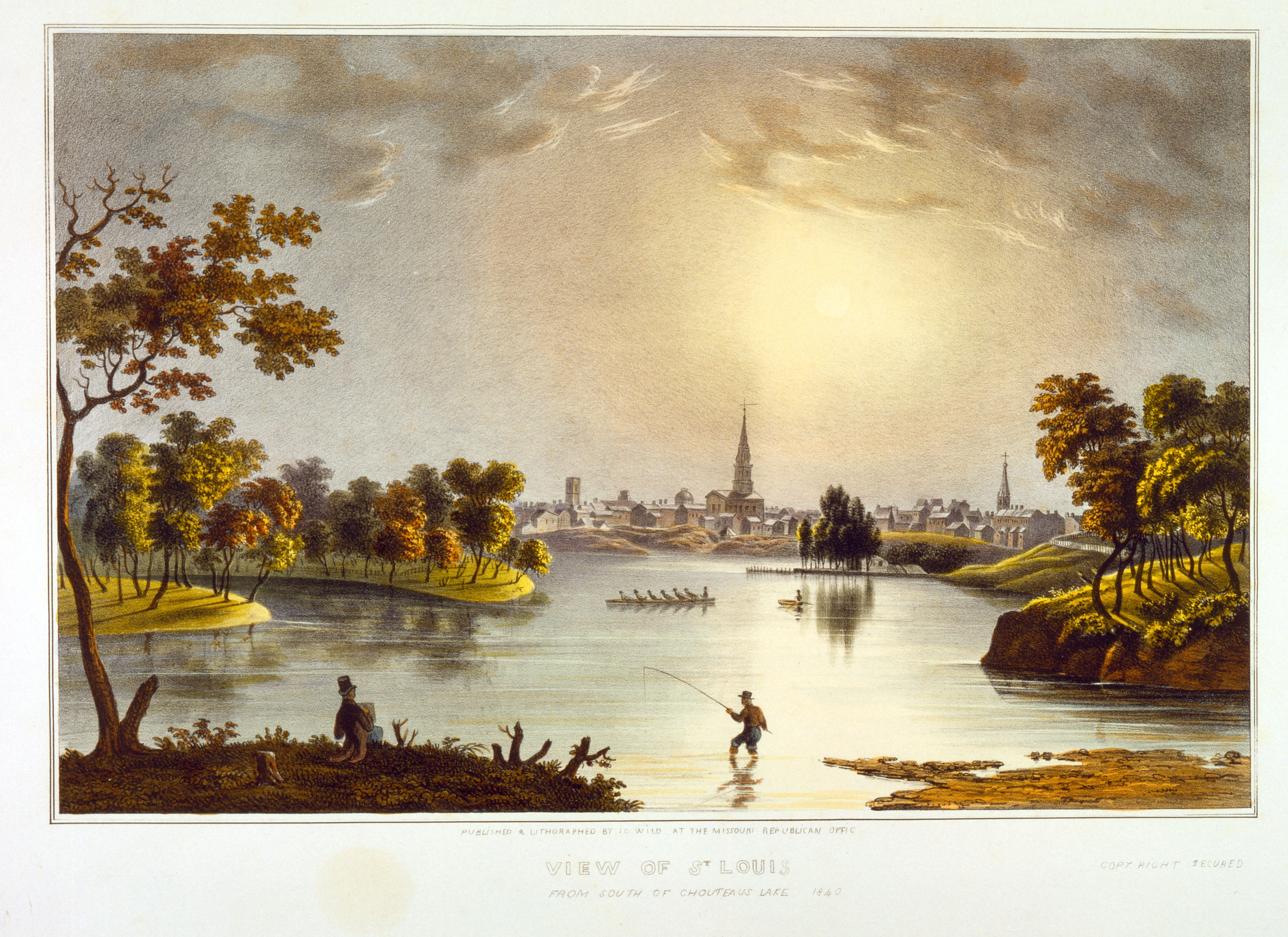
View of St. Louis in 1840 from Chouteau's Pond, where many washerwomen gathered to do laundry

On May 29, 1840, Harriet, Dred and eighteen-month-old baby Eliza left Fort Snelling by steamboat, together with John and Irene Emerson. Dr. Emerson left the Scott family in St. Louis, Missouri with his wife Irene, and proceeded to Cedar Keys, Florida on his own. He would remain in Florida for two-and-a-half years, serving as a medical officer in the Second Seminole War.

Many have questioned why Harriet and Dred would have moved to Missouri, a slave state, rather than try to remain in Iowa Territory, where they might have been able to live in freedom. Historian Lea VanderVelde argues that the Scotts simply had no other viable option. On May 6, 1840, the civilian settlement at Camp Coldwater near Fort Snelling was burned to the ground after a U.S. marshal evicted nearly all of its residents. And unlike freedman Jim Thompson who found work building new houses for Coldwater refugees, the Scotts lacked skills in hunting, fishing and the Dakota language, which were essential to surviving in the harsh Minnesota climate.

As long as Dr. Emerson was alive, the Scotts would enjoy some protection as a family unit. In many ways, his long absences also allowed Harriet and Dred some autonomy in living their lives, even if their financial dependence on him could hardly be called a "choice."

=== Life on the Sanford farm ===
Irene Sanford Emerson went to live with her father, Colonel Alexander Sanford, on his 380-acre farm in north St. Louis County, Missouri. The farm had been purchased by her brother, John F. A. Sanford, for their father who had gone bankrupt. Colonel Sanford enslaved four farmhands, who lived in separate slave quarters where the Scott family was most likely expected to stay.

At first, Harriet and Dred probably continued working as domestic servants for Mrs. Emerson, since they lacked experience in heavy field work. Eventually, they were "rented out" to friends and acquaintances of Mrs. Emerson and Colonel Sanford in St. Louis, where laundresses in particular were in high demand.

=== Hired out in St. Louis ===
Much to Dr. Emerson's disappointment, he was discharged from the Army Medical Corps in 1842, after the end of the Seminole War. He returned to St. Louis and bought a 19-acre plot of land three miles outside the city limits, but was cash-strapped and unsuccessful in trying to get himself reinstated.

Without a steady income of his own, Dr. Emerson appears to have relied on income from "hiring out" Harriet and Dred's services to other families in the St. Louis area. Selling the Scotts in the St. Louis slave market was not an option. By then, potential buyers there were aware that enslaved people who had lived in the North were entitled to freedom if they sued.

In the summer of 1843, Dr. Emerson settled in Davenport, Iowa, where he had claimed land previously, and tried to start his own physician's practice. Meanwhile, Harriet probably remained in St. Louis, where Dred had started working for Irene's brother-in-law, Captain Henry Bainbridge, at Jefferson Barracks in March 1843.

==== Death of Dr. Emerson ====
John Emerson died suddenly on December 29, 1843, at the age of forty. The cause of death was listed as consumption (tuberculosis), but he may have been suffering from complications from syphilis. He had quickly drafted a will before he died, mentioning his wife and infant daughter Henrietta, but said nothing about Dred or Harriet. An inventory of his estate in Missouri also made no mention of slaves. Mrs. Emerson, now a thirty-year-old widow, was apparently in shock about his death and moved back in with her father. With a baby daughter who had lost her father and a new house under construction in Iowa which she no longer needed, the Scott family's future was probably far from Irene Emerson's mind immediately after the death of her husband.

==== Birth of Lizzie ====
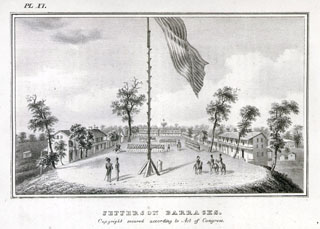
Jefferson Barracks c.1846

In 1844, Harriet gave birth to her second daughter, Lizzie, at Jefferson Barracks in Missouri. Although Lizzie had been born in a slave state, according to the law, children inherited the status of their mother. Therefore, if Harriet were successful in establishing her claim to freedom, Lizzie would be free as well. This time, Harriet likely named her baby after another Taliaferro servant named Lizzie. In addition to Eliza and Lizzie, Harriet had given birth to two sons who died as infants.

==== Dred's departure with the Army ====
On April 27, 1844, Dred Scott left with Captain Henry Bainbridge and the entire Third Infantry Regiment on a steamship headed for Louisiana, where they joined the "Army of Observation" led by General Zachary Taylor. Dred served as Bainbridge's personal valet and accompanied him as far as Corpus Christi, Texas in March 1845. Bainbridge finally sent Dred home to St. Louis in March 1846, as the troops were mobilized at the outbreak of the Mexican–American War.

During the two years that Dred was away, Harriet may have already been hired out to a wealthy grocery merchant, Samuel Russell, co-owner of wholesaler Russell & Bennett in St. Louis. Mrs. Russell would later state in her deposition that both Harriet and Dred had been brought to her home in a wagon by Colonel Sanford. VanderVelde suggests that Harriet most likely worked as a laundress for the Russells, and that she and her daughters were probably living at the Russell family home when Dred returned.

==== Second African Baptist Church ====
Harriet became a member of the Second African Baptist Church in St. Louis, which was headed by Reverend John R. Anderson. Anderson may have connected the Scotts to their first lawyer, Francis B. Murdoch, who initiated their freedom suits. Murdoch had been the prosecuting attorney in Alton, Illinois, where abolitionist newspaper editor Elijah Lovejoy was killed by a proslavery mob in 1837. Anderson had been Lovejoy's typesetter and had moved back to St. Louis soon after the incident. Both men dedicated much of their time to helping enslaved people in St. Louis sue for their freedom.

== The freedom suits ==
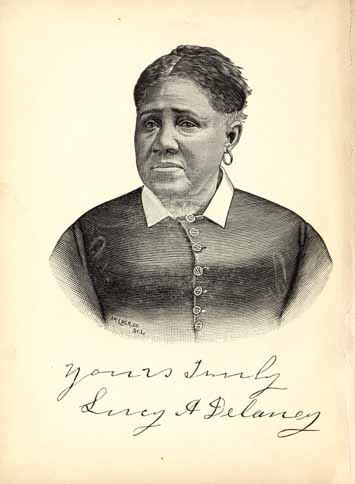
Lucy Berry and her mother Polly Wash worked as laundresses in St. Louis and won their freedom suits in 1843 and 1844, represented by Francis Murdoch

Harriet and Dred were reunited in St. Louis in March 1846, when he returned from Texas. Since the death of Dr. Emerson in December 1843, they had been understandably concerned about the future of their family. Now they were especially worried about the risk of losing Eliza and Lizzie. Eliza had reached the age of eight, the age at which enslavers often separated children from their families, either by hiring them out or selling them. They may have also feared being sold as slaves in the plantation South.

At the same time, Harriet was aware of the many freedom suits that had been won by enslaved women in Missouri – through her involvement in the Second African Baptist Church, and quite likely from the community of black washerwomen in St. Louis, many of whom had successfully sued for freedom themselves. Since Winny v. Whitesides in 1824, the legal precedent had been set that enslaved people taken to live in a free state or territory could not be re-enslaved upon their return to Missouri. From 1824 to 1844, the Missouri Supreme Court had often decided in favor of slaves suing for their freedom, and this period would later become known as the "golden age" of freedom suits in Missouri.

On April 6, 1846, Harriet and Dred Scott would each file separate lawsuits for freedom. Based on Missouri law, they had strong cases, and should have won easily. They certainly would not have foreseen that they would be embarking on an eleven-year struggle that would take their case from the circuit court of St. Louis County all the way to the United States Supreme Court.

=== Widow Emerson's refusal ===
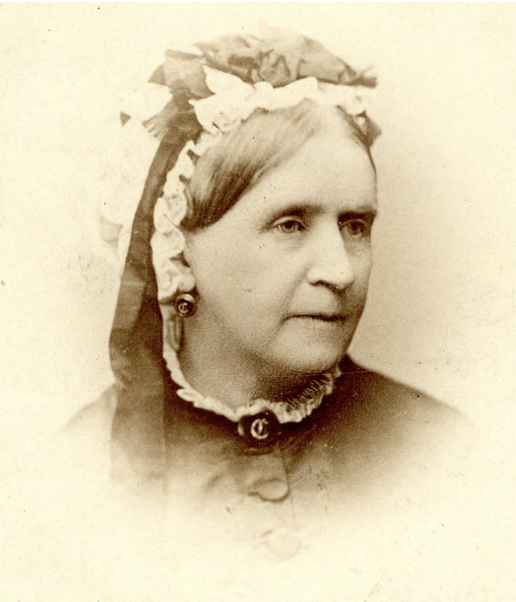
Irene Sanford Emerson much later in life, when she was known as Mrs. Chaffee

In March 1846, soon after returning to St. Louis, Dred Scott asked Irene Emerson if he could buy his own freedom, but she had refused. Dred himself was in his fifties, probably suffering from tuberculosis, and was no longer considered a valuable asset. In all likelihood, then, Mrs. Emerson's refusal was not because she was interested in keeping Dred, who was nearing retirement age and would soon become more of a liability.

Instead, her refusal probably hinged on the fact that Harriet, Eliza and Lizzie Scott were worth much more as "human property" – both in terms of wages from "hiring out," as well as their potential selling price in the slave market. Harriet in particular was much younger and healthier than Dred, and Mrs. Emerson and her father, Colonel Sanford, had been collecting her monthly earnings for some time.

Even if Mrs. Emerson had considered freeing the Scotts, she may have realized that Missouri law at the time tried to prevent slaveowners from "abandoning" their elderly, infirm and young slaves by forcing them to sell some of their other assets to support them once they were free. In the end, the final decision may have been made by Colonel Sanford, Irene's proslavery father. Alexander Sanford was a vice president in the Anti-Abolitionist Society in St. Louis. As a woman, Mrs. Emerson would not have been able to provide Dred with the legal papers he needed to prove his emancipation, without having two white men swear oaths attesting to her signature.

=== Separate lawsuits ===
Harriet and Dred filed separate petitions in the St. Louis Circuit Court on April 6, 1846. They were promptly granted permission to bring suits against Irene Emerson, which they did later that day. This was the first time since the Missouri circuit court case of Laban v. Price that a married couple had pursued a freedom suit, together or separately, in the about fifty years that freedom suits had been conducted. One of Harriet and Dred's great-great-granddaughters, Lynne Jackson, would later note that Harriet had filed a separate suit "because, as a woman and as the mother, if for any reason Dred did not win his case but she did, then their daughters would be free." They did not file separate suits on behalf of Eliza and Lizzie, because legally, the status of Harriet would determine the status of her children.

==== Harriet v. Irene Emerson (1847) ====
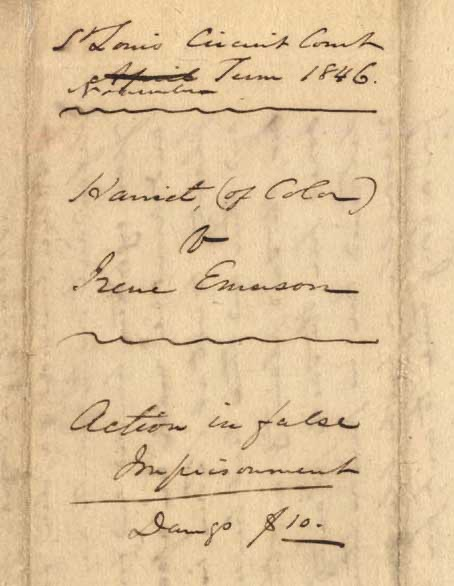
Harriet's name was entered simply as "Harriet, (of Color)" in her first lawsuit filed in 1846, in tandem with her husband Dred Scott

Harriet's case had been filed as "Harriet of color vs. Irene Emerson." Her married name "Scott" did not appear, because Missouri slave law prohibited enslaved people from entering into legal contracts, including marriages. However, unlike Dred's case, which had been "styled" as "Dred Scott, slave vs. Irene Emerson," Harriet's case did not label her as enslaved, suggesting that her legal status was in fact different from that of her husband.

In Harriet's case, there was no deed or proof of sale showing that Lawrence Taliaferro had actually sold her to John Emerson. Even if there had been such a sale, it would not have been valid in Wisconsin Territory, a free territory. Furthermore, Harriet had lived at the Taliaferro household in the supposedly free state of Pennsylvania. Under Pennsylvania's gradual emancipation laws, Harriet would have been eligible to claim her freedom when she turned 28.

Harriet's claim to freedom was arguably stronger than Dred's, but also more complicated and harder to prove. In the end, the Scotts' lawyer decided to plead Missouri law for both Harriet and Dred, given that the principle of "once free, always free" had been regularly upheld by the courts.

The Scotts' first lawyer, Francis B. Murdoch, had filed one-third of all St. Louis freedom suits filed between 1840 and 1847, always on behalf of the enslaved plaintiffs. Murdoch was also very familiar with Pennsylvania law, because he had studied law in Bedford, Pennsylvania; he probably even knew Harriet's enslaver, Lawrence Taliaferro. Legal historian Lea VanderVelde argues that Murdoch had a nuanced understanding of the differences between Harriet and Dred's claims to freedom, which their subsequent lawyers would lack.

Unfortunately for the Scotts, Murdoch abruptly disappeared from St. Louis. His mortgage was foreclosed, and by the spring of 1847, he was off the case. In the months and years that followed, the Scotts would be represented by a string of different lawyers, but none as dedicated to freedom suits as F. B. Murdoch.

===== Verdict for the defendant =====
Due to a crowded docket, Dred's case did not come to trial until June 30, 1847. The jury decided in favor of the defendant, Irene Emerson, based on a technicality. Upon cross examination, witness Samuel Russell admitted that he himself had not arranged to hire Harriet and Dred from Irene Emerson; instead, it had all been handled by his wife, Adeline, and he had simply paid for their services. On this basis, Russell's testimony was dismissed as hearsay and the jury found that the Scotts had failed to prove that Irene Emerson had enslaved them in the first place. The Scotts' third attorney, Samuel M. Bay, moved for and was granted a new trial.

===== Retroactive entry for Harriet =====
In December 1847, during an audit of the St. Louis Circuit Court, Judge Alexander Hamilton noticed that he had neglected Harriet's case. Only Dred's case had been formally submitted to jurors in June. The judge wrote in the docket that he had intended to try Harriet's case at the same time. According to VanderVelde:

For correction, he simply recopied the entries of Dred's case in Harriet's name, down to the names of the jurors, as if her case had been placed before them six months before. From the judge's viewpoint, overlooking Harriet was a harmless error as long as he granted her a new trial too. It seems that Harriet had been denied even this initial day in court – probably denied even this moment of the jury's attention. As Dred's wife, she was treated as just an appendage to her husband, much as history would treat her, swept along for the ride.

==== Irene Emerson v. Harriet (1848) ====
On December 4, 1847, Mrs. Emerson's lawyer, George Goode, objected to a retrial by filing a bill of exceptions for an appeal to the Missouri Supreme Court. Irene Emerson v. Harriet came up for consideration on April 3, 1848. The Scotts' new lawyers, Alexander P. Field and David N. Hall, argued that Goode had made a procedural error by bringing the case to the state supreme court on writ of error. On June 30, 1848, the Supreme Court of Missouri decided unanimously to dismiss Emerson's appeal. In his decision in favor of Harriet, Judge William Scott noted that her husband's case was "in all respects similar...a similar disposition is made of it." It would take another two years for the Scotts' cases to be heard again.

==== Into the sheriff's custody ====
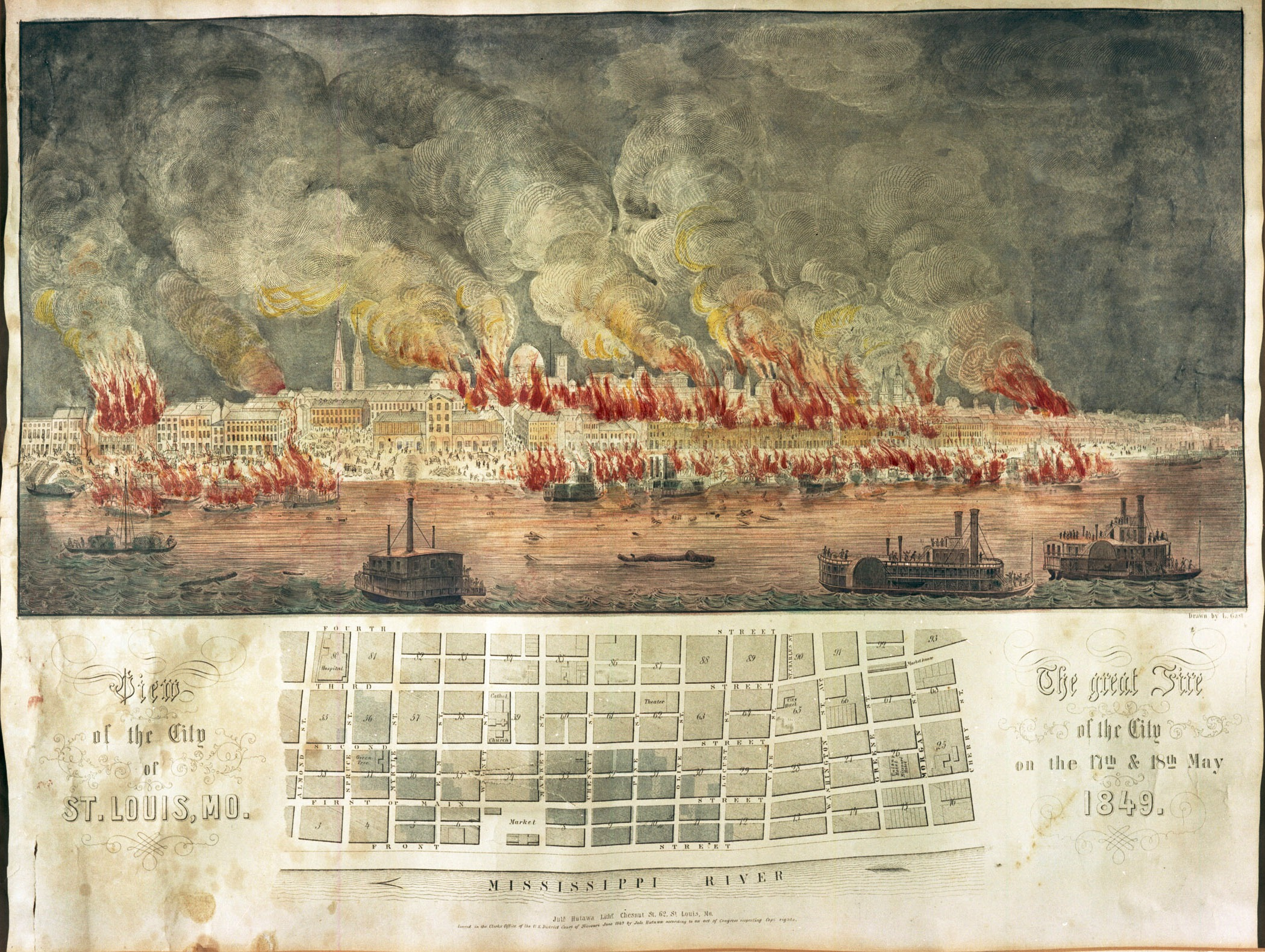
The St. Louis fire of 1849 and a cholera epidemic further delayed the retrial

On March 17, 1848, in response to a motion filed by Irene Emerson's lawyer, Judge Hamilton ordered the sheriff of St. Louis County to take custody of Harriet and Dred, and hire them out for the duration of the lawsuit. Litigants in freedom suits were often jailed and hired out in this way. Anyone hiring them out would have to post a bond promising that the Scotts would not be taken out of the court's jurisdiction. The wages they earned would be held by the sheriff and later paid to the party that won the lawsuit.

Mrs. Emerson's request was ironic, given that her lawyer George Goode had argued that the Scotts had failed to prove she was their enslaver. She may have been spurred to act due to financial pressures following the death of her father, Colonel Alexander Sanford, in February 1848. This arrangement would allow Mrs. Emerson to maintain ownership and eventually collect the Scotts' wages, without being responsible for their welfare during that time.

For the next nine years, Harriet and Dred would remain in the sheriff's custody, or hired out by him, until March 18, 1857. Their whereabouts from 1848 to 1849 are unknown. The Scotts likely spent some time in jail, joined by Eliza and Lizzie for part of the time. Dred was hired out to one of his lawyers, David N. Hall, for a period of two years from 1849 to 1851, until Hall suddenly died. Historian VanderVelde suggests that during the cholera epidemic, Dred and Harriet also worked for two St. Louis doctors – Dr. S. F. Watts, followed by Dr. R. M Jennings – because both were summoned as witnesses when the court docket was finally called in 1850.

From 1851 onward, both Harriet and Dred were hired out to another lawyer, Charles Edmund LaBeaume, brother-in-law of Peter Ethelrod Blow. Dred had worked for the Blow family as an enslaved servant for many years until they sold him to Dr. John Emerson when they were having financial difficulties. Many years later, at least seven members or in-laws of the Blow family were involved in supporting the Scotts as they pursued their freedom through the courts.

==== Dred Scott v. Irene Emerson (1850) ====
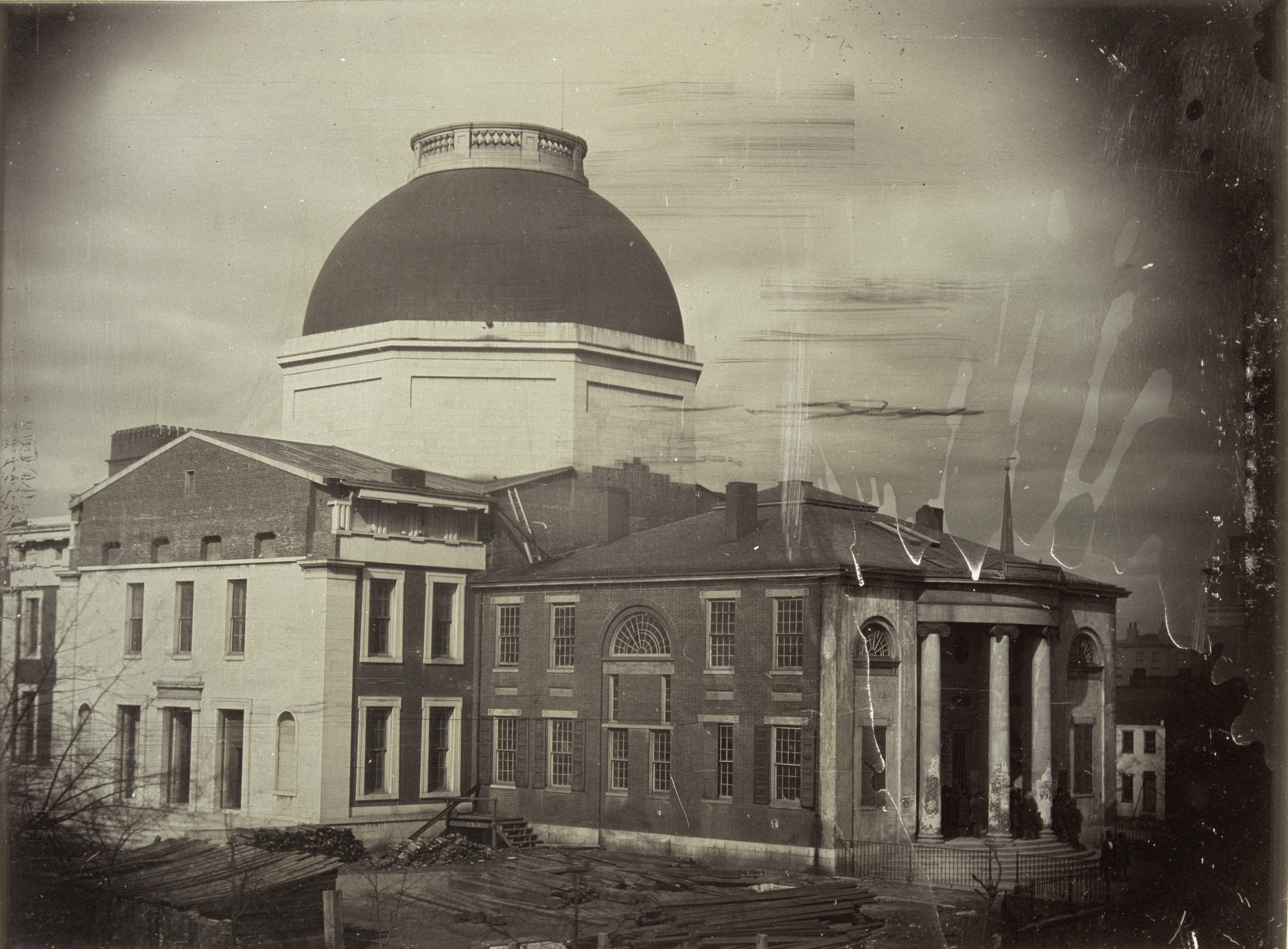
Old Courthouse in St. Louis (1851)

The Scotts' case was finally called once again at the circuit court of St. Louis County on January 12, 1850. The retrial was delayed for many reasons, including the St. Louis fire of 1849 and a cholera epidemic after the fire. As before, Judge Hamilton was presiding. The Scotts were now represented by Alexander P. Field and David N. Hall. Field was a prominent trial lawyer with expertise in damage suits, while Hall was a young lawyer who had also worked on the freedom suit Pierre v. Gabriel Chouteau on behalf of the plaintiff.

The proceedings of the second trial were in many ways similar to the first. This time, however, Field and Hall read into the record the testimony of Adeline Russell, who had stated in a deposition that she had hired the Scotts from Irene Emerson, thereby confirming that Mrs. Emerson was their enslaver. Her husband, Samuel Russell, then testified in person again that he and his wife had hired the Scotts and that he had paid their wages. Lawyers for the defense could no longer deny that the Scotts were not enslaved by Mrs. Emerson. Instead, they argued that she was legally entitled to hire out Dred Scott, because Dr. Emerson had been under military jurisdiction when he took Dred to Fort Armstrong and Fort Snelling. In doing so, they ignored the precedent set by Rachel v. Walker in 1836, which had established that military officers forfeited their slaves by taking them to a territory where slavery was prohibited. Furthermore, as pointed out by Scott's lawyers, Dr. Emerson had chosen to leave the Scotts at Fort Snelling working for others, when he first departed for Fort Jesup.

===== Verdict for the plaintiff =====
The jury quickly returned their verdict, finding Mrs. Emerson guilty of holding Dred Scott as a slave against his will in Missouri. Judge Hamilton then ordered "that the plaintiff recover his freedom against said defendant and all persons claiming under her by title derived since the commencement of this suit." Dred was found to have been set free according to Missouri law since 1833 when he went to Fort Armstrong, and Harriet, Eliza and Lizzie were declared free as well. Their newfound freedom would not last long, as Mrs. Emerson's lawyers appealed.

=== Consolidation of cases ===
Irene Emerson's lawyers, Hugh A. Garland and Lyman D. Norris, first moved for a new trial but were overruled. They then filed an appeal with the Missouri Supreme Court.

At this time, the lawyers for both sides signed an agreement that the outcome of Dred's case would apply to Harriet's as well, because their cases were viewed as "identical." In fact, they were not, since Harriet had lived in Pennsylvania and technically had not been "sold" to Dr. Emerson. However, the burden of proving a negative – the fact that she did not actually belong to anyone – also made things more challenging for presumed slaves such as Harriet. Since they had just won in the lower court, the Scotts' lawyer, David N. Hall, may have felt confident that they could win once again in the state supreme court based on the precedent established by Rachael v. Walker, without going into details about the differences in their personal circumstances. By subsuming Harriet's case under Dred's, their daughters' legal status was now also tied to the outcome of Scott v. Emerson.

==== Scott v. Emerson (1852) ====
Although briefs were filed in March 1850, the Missouri Supreme Court delayed consideration of the case until the October term that year. David N. Hall wrote the brief on behalf of Dred Scott, but died in March 1851, leaving Alexander P. Field to continue alone as counsel. Before Judge William Barclay Napton could finish writing the court's opinion – reportedly rejecting Dred Scott's claim to freedom – the Missouri justices faced their first supreme court election in August 1851. The case then needed to be considered again by the newly elected court.

===== Decision for the defendant =====
On March 22, 1852, Judge Scott announced the decision of the Missouri Supreme Court reversing the lower court's decision and re-enslaving Dred Scott. In doing so, the court also reversed its own precedent of "once free, always free."

==== Attempt to reclaim slaves ====
On March 23, 1852, one day after the state supreme court decision was announced, lawyers for Irene Emerson Chaffee filed a notice to the circuit court of St. Louis County asking for the bonds signed by the Blow family covering the Scotts' court costs; the wages earned by Dred and Harriet since 1848 "with the six percent interest, allowed by law"; and custody of the re-enslaved Scott family.

It was unclear what Mrs. Chaffee was intending to do with the Scotts once they were returned to her as slaves. By this time, Mrs. Chaffee had remarried and moved to the free state of Massachusetts, and likely had no intention to move them there. Her brother, John F. A. Sanford, lived in the free state of New York. Although he often returned to St. Louis, he probably had no use for slaves either, since he had already sold their late fathers' slaves. Historian Kenneth C. Kaufman suggests that Mrs. Chaffee intended to sell Dred and his family. To protect them, Harriet and Dred sent their daughters into hiding. On June 29, 1852, Judge Hamilton denied the motion to have the Scotts and their earnings transferred to Mrs. Chaffee, writing in the court's journal, "Said motion be overruled."

== Federal court case ==
The Missouri Supreme Court ruling affected not only the Scott family, but also the wider black community in St. Louis where they lived. Others who had been waiting to secure their freedom through the Missouri courts now found that route had essentially closed. Nevertheless, Harriet and Dred did not give up. The only legal avenue available to them now was to sue in the federal courts.

=== Dred Scott v. John F. A. Sanford (1854) ===
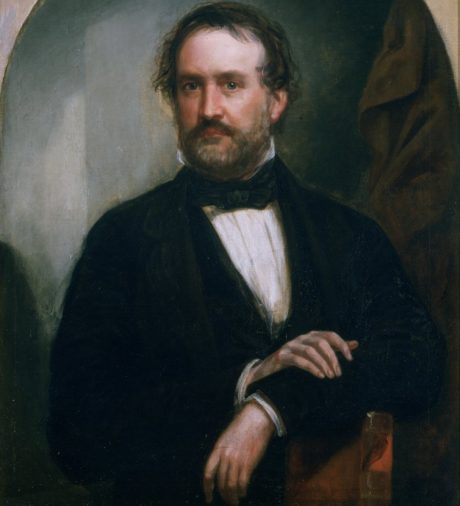
Roswell M. Field, lawyer for Dred Scott

On November 2, 1853, a diversity suit was filed on behalf of Dred Scott in the United States circuit court for the district of Missouri. Their new lawyer was Roswell M. Field, a native of Vermont who practiced real estate law. Field was a personal friend of Judge Hamilton and Justice Gamble, and had been approached by lawyer C. Edmund LeBeaume, who had hired Harriet and Dred from the sheriff and supported them since 1851. Roswell Field was said to have "strong antislavery sentiments," but his primary interest in the case was to correct the misapplication of Missouri law after the Missouri Supreme Court had chosen to disregard all legal precedent. Many historians have thus argued that the Scott family's freedom was of secondary concern to Field.

A more direct route would have been to appeal Scott v. Emerson directly to the Supreme Court of the United States. However, doing so was doomed to failure and would most likely have resulted in a dismissal. Only two years prior, the United States Supreme Court had refused to accept jurisdiction in Strader v. Graham. In a unanimous Opinion of the Court, Chief Justice Roger B. Taney had expressed that it was up to the slave state of Kentucky to decide the status of a slave returning from the free state of Ohio, and could not be influenced by the laws of Ohio, and hence, was also not for the Supreme Court to decide.

This time, Field chose to sue John F. A. Sanford, the brother of Irene Emerson Chaffee and an executor of the late Dr. Emerson's estate. Sanford resided in New York, which justified bringing the suit to federal court, but often returned to St. Louis on business. He was served with process by the marshal in St. Louis, most likely while he was visiting his mentor and former father-in-law, Pierre Chouteau Jr. Irene Chaffee herself would later state that it was the Chouteau family who had persuaded her brother to fight the Scott case until the end. Pierre Chouteau Jr. was the wealthiest man in St. Louis, and probably the largest slaveholder in the city. Over the years, the Chouteau family had had numerous freedom suits brought against them, which they fought tenaciously in an effort to keep their slaves enslaved.

For the first time, the initial declaration named Harriet as "Harriet Scott, then and still the wife of the plaintiff." Both children were named in the federal action with last names as "Eliza Scott" and "Lizzy Scott." Biographer Kaufman writes, "If Roswell Field, as attorney for the Scotts, did nothing else for Dred and Harriet Scott, he restored to them at least in the court records the dignity of a family name, recognizing their lawful marriage and the two children born of that marriage." Another difference from the earlier suits was that the federal filing claimed significant damages of $9,000 for Dred and Harriet, rather than only $10.

In April 1854, John F. A. Sanford and his lawyer Hugh A. Garland filed a plea in abatement denying the jurisdiction of the court, arguing that Dred Scott did not have the right to citizenship in Missouri. Their reasoning was because "he is a negro of African descent – his ancestors were of pure African blood and were brought into this country and sold as negro slaves." This was the first time in the Dred Scott case that the right of a black person to be a citizen of the United States was called into question.

Judge Wells upheld Field's demurrer on the grounds that a free black man would be "enough of a citizen" under the diverse citizenship clause. Sanford then entered a plea of not guilty. Field submitted an "Agreed Statement of Facts" outlining the history of Dred's travels with Dr. John Emerson, which contained factual inaccuracies and later confused many historians, but served the immediate purpose.

==== Verdict for the defendant ====
On May 15, 1854, the case finally came to trial in federal court with Judge Robert W. Wells presiding. Judge Wells instructed the jury that the laws covering the facts in the case did not grant Dred Scott his freedom. He explained that a removal of a slave to the free state of Illinois only suspended his enslavement temporarily, until his return to Missouri. This had been the reason given by the Missouri Supreme Court in Scott v. Emerson in 1852, and Judge Wells stated, "The U.S. courts follow the State courts in regards to the interpretation of their own law."

On this basis, the jury returned a verdict in favor of John Sanford, finding him not guilty of assault, trespass and false imprisonment, and that Dred Scott, Harriet Scott and their daughters were "negro slaves the lawful property of the defendant." Historian VanderVelde writes:

The Scotts had lost before, but their spirits must have sunk again to hear the foreman declare that the jury had sided against them. Given the verdict, Harriet and Dred probably sought, at this time, to change the girls’ hiding place before someone moved in to seize them.

Field's motion for a new trial was overruled, after which he instituted an appeal to the Supreme Court of the United States.

=== Dred Scott v. Sandford (1857) ===
On May 30, 1854, President Franklin Pierce signed the Kansas–Nebraska Act into law. The Act repealed the Missouri Compromise, allowing the two states to determine for themselves whether or not to adopt slavery.

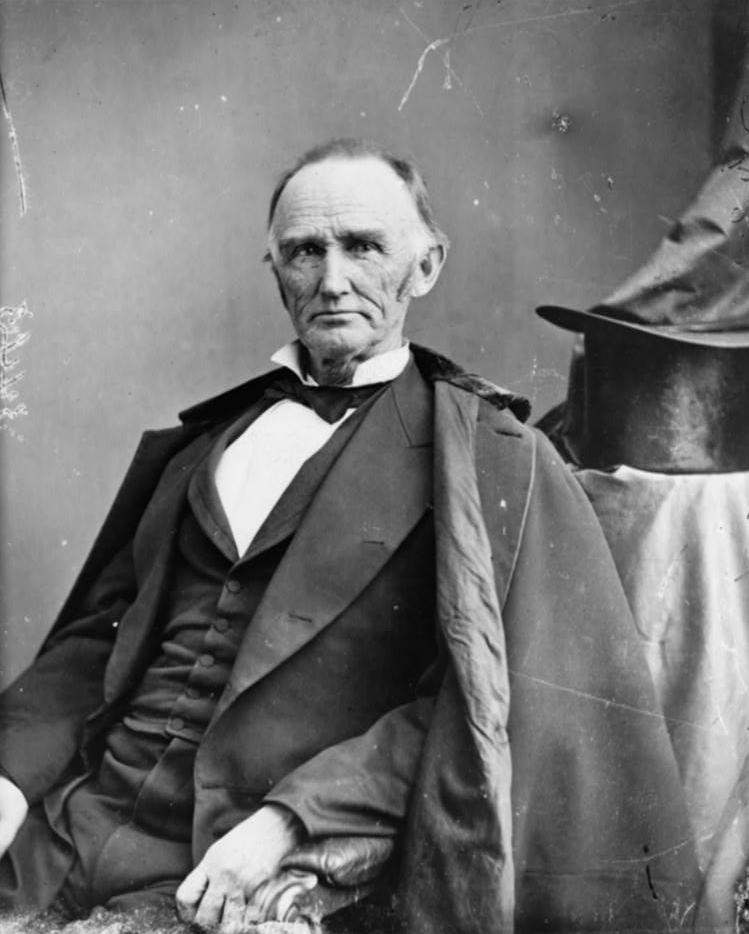
Lawyer Montgomery Blair argued for Dred Scott in the Supreme Court of the United States

Montgomery Blair, a former St. Louis judge who had moved to Washington, D.C., was asked by Roswell Field to represent the Scotts. On December 30, 1854, Blair finally wrote to Field agreeing to take the case pro bono, after Gamaliel Bailey, editor of the antislavery newspaper The National Era, had agreed to cover any expenses. Blair most likely never met his clients, the Scotts, in person.

Meanwhile, Sanford's lawyer Hugh A. Garland had died. In his place, Reverdy Johnson and Missouri Senator Henry S. Geyer agreed to represent John F. A. Sanford.

From February 11 to 14, 1856, the Supreme Court heard the first round of arguments from both sides. Blair argued that an enslaved person who had been emancipated in a free state remained free even after returning to a slave state. He also argued that a free black person had the right to sue as a citizen in the federal courts.

Geyer and Johnson argued that Dred Scott had never been free in the first place because Congress did not have the authority to prohibit slavery in the territories; only individual states could decide that for themselves. It was the first time that the very constitutionality of the Missouri Compromise had become a part of the Dred Scott case. They conceded that Dred might have been free in Illinois, but that he relinquished his freedom when he returned to Missouri voluntarily.

After repeated consultations about the case, the Supreme Court announced on May 12, 1856, that it had ordered the legal counsel to reargue the case the following term. That summer, sectional tensions between abolitionists and proslavery forces turned violent. In the election on November 4, 1856, the United States elected James Buchanan as president in a three-way race.

==== Illnesses ====
That year, Harriet had to look after Dred, who had become very ill with tuberculosis. At one point in the winter, Dred had been expected to die; his death would have rendered the Supreme Court case moot. By the fall of 1856, however, Dred had recovered enough to resume sweeping the offices of Roswell Field.

In December 1856, John F. A. Sanford suffered a nervous breakdown and was transferred to a sanitarium where he remained until his death the following year. Pierre Chouteau Jr. said that he thought Sanford suffered from stress due to overextending himself financially.

==== Presidential inauguration ====
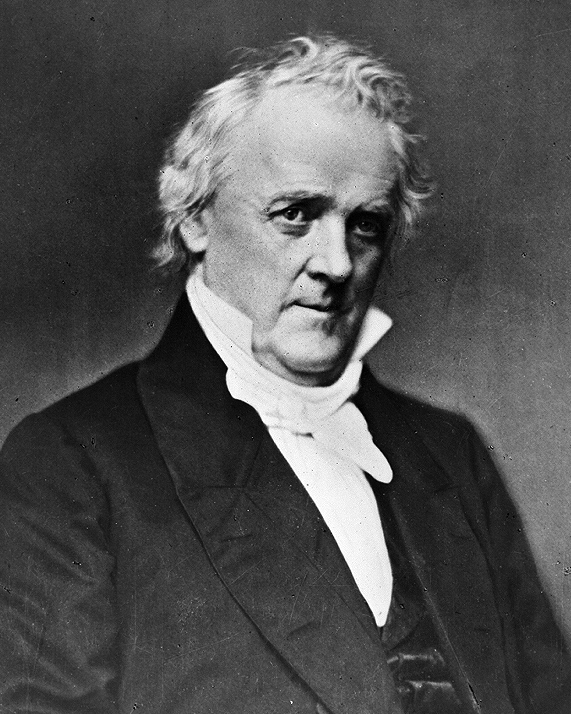
James Buchanan was inaugurated as President on March 4, 1857, two days before the Supreme Court decision was read

Lawyers for both sides filed printed briefs and the second round of oral arguments took place between December 15 and 18, 1856. The Dred Scott case now captured the attention of the media nationwide and within Congress. On February 3, President-elect James Buchanan wrote to Justice John Catron to ask if there was any way that the Supreme Court could announce its decision before his inauguration in March. Catron later replied encouraging Buchanan to contact Justice Robert Grier, a Northerner, to influence Grier's decision on the constitutionality of the Missouri Compromise.

The Supreme Court justices met in consultation in a series of meetings in February and March. In his inauguration address on March 4, 1857, President James Buchanan said regarding Dred Scott v. Sandford:

A difference of opinion has arisen in regard to the point of time when the people of a Territory shall decide this question for themselves. This is, happily, a matter of but little practical importance. Besides, it is a judicial question, which legitimately belongs to the Supreme Court of the United States, before whom it is now pending, and will, it is understood, be speedily and finally settled. To their decision, in common with all good citizens, I shall cheerfully submit, whatever this may be.

==== Supreme Court decision ====
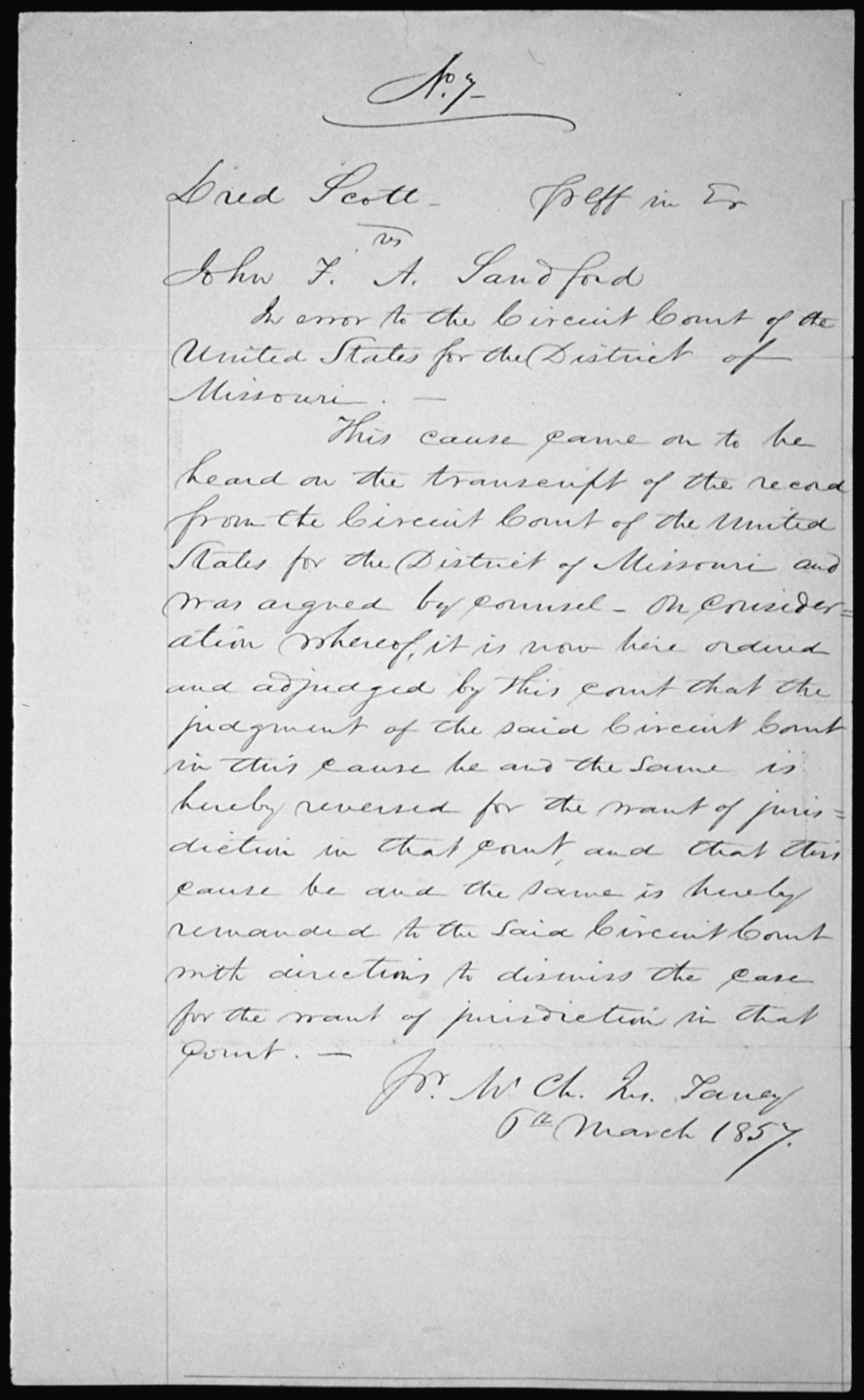
Page from majority opinion in Dred Scott v. Sandford (1857)

On March 6, 1857, Chief Justice Roger B. Taney finally read the long-anticipated Opinion of the Court. The majority opinion blocked the Scotts' ability to sue for freedom in several ways. The most controversial ruling was that people of African descent could not be citizens of the United States due to their race. Because of this, the Scotts and all African Americans would no longer be able to able to sue in the federal courts for their freedom or for anything else. In addition, the Supreme Court took the unprecedented step of declaring two acts of Congress – the Missouri Compromise of 1820 and the Northwest Ordinance of 1787 – unconstitutional.

At the end of his Opinion, Justice Taney ruled that the United States Circuit Court in St. Louis should dismiss the case due to lack of jurisdiction. However, the mandate to do so was never actually issued by the Supreme Court because the court costs for John F. A. Sanford were never paid. To this day, the federal court records remain unchanged. Nevertheless, on March 18, 1857, the state circuit court of St. Louis County, where the Scott family's legal battles had begun in 1846, finally closed out their case. Eleven years later, Harriet, Dred, Eliza and Lizzie Scott remained enslaved.

== Life after the legal battle ==
Following their devastating loss in the Supreme Court of the United States, the Scott family found themselves at the center of national media attention. In St. Louis, Dred Scott became a local celebrity. One newspaper called him "the best known colored person in the world." Dred consented to interviews and laughed about all the "fuss" made about him, but was weary of the toll the case had taken on their family, and said he would not have done it all again. He was offered $1,000 to tour the North and tell his story, which he declined. Harriet reportedly objected to these offers, because she was afraid that he would be kidnapped.

Harriet was particularly cautious about all the publicity. In the spring of 1857, many newspapers reported that Eliza and Lizzie remained in hiding. One article in the Missouri Republican mentioned that Mrs. Chaffee had sent a "policeman" to "hunt them down."

=== Congressman Chaffee ===
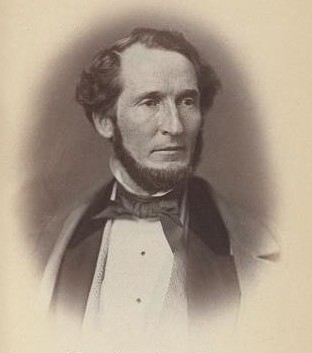
Congressman Calvin C. Chaffee of Massachusetts

Meanwhile, the national spotlight on the Dred Scott case was extremely embarrassing for Republican Congressman Calvin C. Chaffee, an outspoken abolitionist from Massachusetts. He had married Irene Sanford Emerson in 1850, before he was elected to office in 1854. As newspapers across the country asked, "Who owned Dred Scott?", Mrs. Chaffee was exposed as the true owner, and her husband was severely criticized for his apparent hypocrisy. Writing in the Springfield newspaper The Republican, Chaffee initially claimed that only John Sanford had any power in the lawsuit and that "neither myself nor any member of my family were consulted in relation to, or even knew of the existence of the suit till after it was noticed for trial, when we learned it in an accidental way.”

The credibility of that claim was called into question again, when on May 5, 1857, John F. A. Sanford died in the asylum where he had been confined since December. Chaffee then took steps to transfer ownership of the Scotts as soon as possible to someone who could free them. Only a Missouri resident could manumit them since they lived in Missouri. Taylor Blow stepped in to assist. Although Congressman Chaffee announced that he did not and would not profit from the Dred Scott case, Irene Chaffee insisted on collecting the wages earned by Harriet and Dred during the legal battle from the sheriff in St. Louis. The funds, reportedly totaling $1,000, (~$34,554 in 2025) were collected by Mrs. Chaffee's attorney and appear to have been transferred to her by the Chouteau family.

=== Free at last ===
Frank Leslie's Illustrated Newspaper featured engravings of the family on its front page on June 27, 1857, based on daguerreotypes taken in a photography studio

On May 26, 1857, the Scotts were officially freed. Harriet and Dred Scott appeared in the St. Louis Circuit Court, together with Taylor Blow, before Judge Alexander Hamilton. The court records state:

Taylor Blow, who is personally Known to the Court, and acknowledges the execution by him of a Deed of Emancipation to his slaves, Dred Scott, aged about forty eight years, of full negro blood and color, and Harriet Scott wife of said Dred, aged thirty nine years, also of full negro blood and color, and Eliza Scott a daughter of said Dred and Harriet, aged nineteen years of full negro color, and Lizzy Scott, also a daughter of said Dred and Harriet, aged ten years likewise of full negro blood and color.

Once their freedom papers had been secured, Eliza, age 19, and Lizzie, age 14, finally emerged from hiding. They appeared considerably younger than their age, possibly from malnourishment.

Harriet took in laundry to earn money, assisted by Eliza and Lizzie in ironing. Dred was offered a job as a doorman at Barnum's Hotel in St. Louis, one of the "widely known hotels in the West." The hotel was run by Theron Barnum, a cousin of P. T. Barnum. As he was too old to carry heavy trunks himself, Dred served as a celebrity greeter to hotel guests, many of whom were curious about his story. Dred accepted tips and also delivered clean laundry which had been washed by Harriet.

==== Frank Leslie's Illustrated Newspaper ====
One day in June 1857, two journalists from Frank Leslie's Illustrated Newspaper visited the Scott family at their house in an alley off Carr Street. They were greeted at the door by Harriet, who was very protective of Dred and suspicious of their motives. Although Harriet initially asked them to leave Dred and her family in peace, the journalists produced a letter of introduction from the Scotts' lawyer, whose signature they recognized. The reporters eventually convinced Harriet to allow her family to sit for their portraits at photographer Fitzgibbon's studio the next day. Harriet agreed on the condition that the family receive their own copies of their daguerreotype portraits as well. The engraved portraits of Eliza and Lizzie Scott sitting together, and the famous individual portraits of Dred and Harriet, were featured on the front page of Frank Leslie's Illustrated Newspaper on June 27, 1857.

==== Death of Dred ====
Dred Scott died at home on September 17, 1858, fifteen months after his family's emancipation. He died of tuberculosis. The New York Times published a column-length obituary, which declared that "Few men who have achieved greatness have won it so effectually as this black champion." Dred's fame continued to grow after his death, but his grave in St. Louis remained unmarked. He was first buried at Wesleyan Cemetery in St. Louis and was later reinterred at Cavalry Cemetery.

==== Grandchildren ====
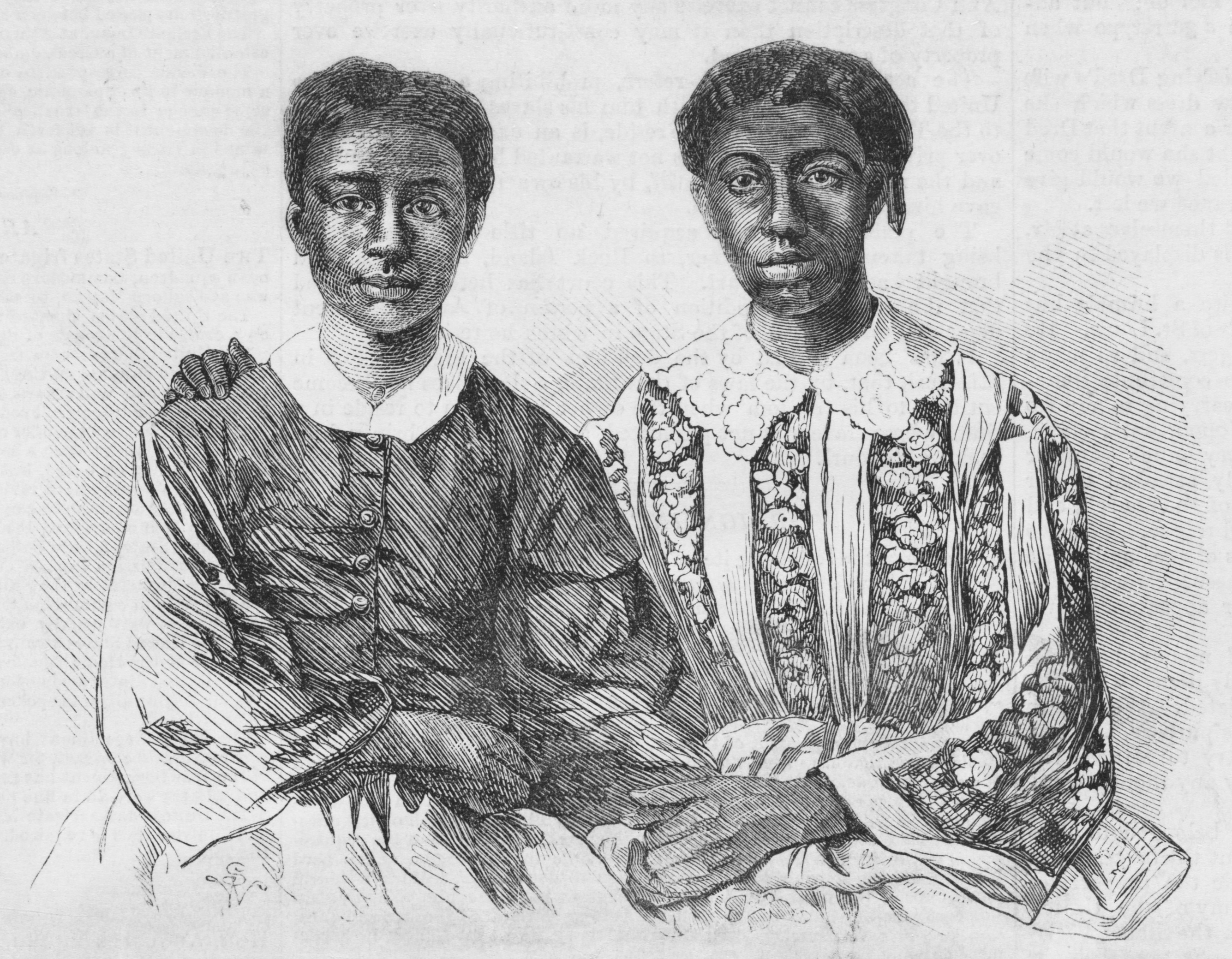
Portrait of Eliza and Lizzie Scott

Harriet Scott lived for nearly 20 more years in freedom in St. Louis, witnessing the Civil War and the end of slavery in the United States of America. She was listed in the St. Louis directories from 1859 to 1876. One entry listed her as "Scott, Harriet, widow of Dred, (colored), alley near Carr between 6th and 7th."

Over the years, she continued to support herself as a washerwoman. One of her daughters married Wilson Madison of St. Louis and the other remained unmarried. Harriet had two grandchildren who survived into adulthood: Harry Madison and John Alexander Madison. On June 17, 1876, Harriet Scott died at the home of her daughter and son-in-law. Three days later, she was buried at Greenwood Cemetery in St. Louis County, also in an unmarked grave.

There has been some confusion among historians about whether her grandsons' mother was Eliza or Lizzie Scott. In recent years, genealogist Ruth Ann Hager has explained that "Eliza Scott Madison and her husband died at a young age, leaving their two teenage sons to be raised by her sister Lizzie." Based on oral history interviews and public records, Hager argues that Lizzie later disguised her identity and went by the name Lizzie Marshall, and lived to be 99 years old. Known to relatives only as "Aunt Lizzie," she helped Scott family descendants with child care and household chores, well into her eighties.

== Legacy ==
The Dred Scott Heritage Foundation was founded in June 2006. Its first project was to plan the commemoration of the 150th anniversary of the Supreme Court decision. The foundation has undertaken several projects to ensure that Harriet Scott's legacy is preserved alongside Dred's.

=== Harriet Scott Memorial Pavilion ===
The Harriet Scott Memorial Pavilion in the Greenwood Cemetery is dedicated to her memory.

The location of her unmarked grave had been forgotten for many years, until it was re-discovered by Etta Daniels of the Greenwood Cemetery Preservation Association in 2006. In 2009, a headstone was finally installed to honor Harriet Scott. The pavilion was dedicated in 2010. There are no plans to try to move Harriet and Dred to the same cemetery, according to Lynne Jackson, great-great granddaughter and president of the foundation.

Founded in 1874, Greenwood Cemetery was the first commercial burial ground for African Americans in St. Louis County, Missouri, and is listed on the National Register of Historic Places. An estimated 50,000 people are buried there, among only 6,000 headstones. The pavilion invites members of the community to purchase memorial pavers to commemorate people whose graves may never be found.

=== Old Courthouse ===
A painting of Harriet and Dred Scott hangs in the Old Courthouse in St. Louis. In addition, in 2012, a bronze statue of Dred and Harriet Scott was dedicated on the south lawn of the Old Courthouse. Commissioned by the Dred Scott Heritage Foundation, the Dred and Harriet Scott Statue depicts them standing close together, holding hands, with their heads held high. The statue marks the starting point of the Scotts' long legal battle, and represents "a fight for liberty and dignity, through grace and perseverance."
