= Central Baptist Church (St. Louis, Missouri) =

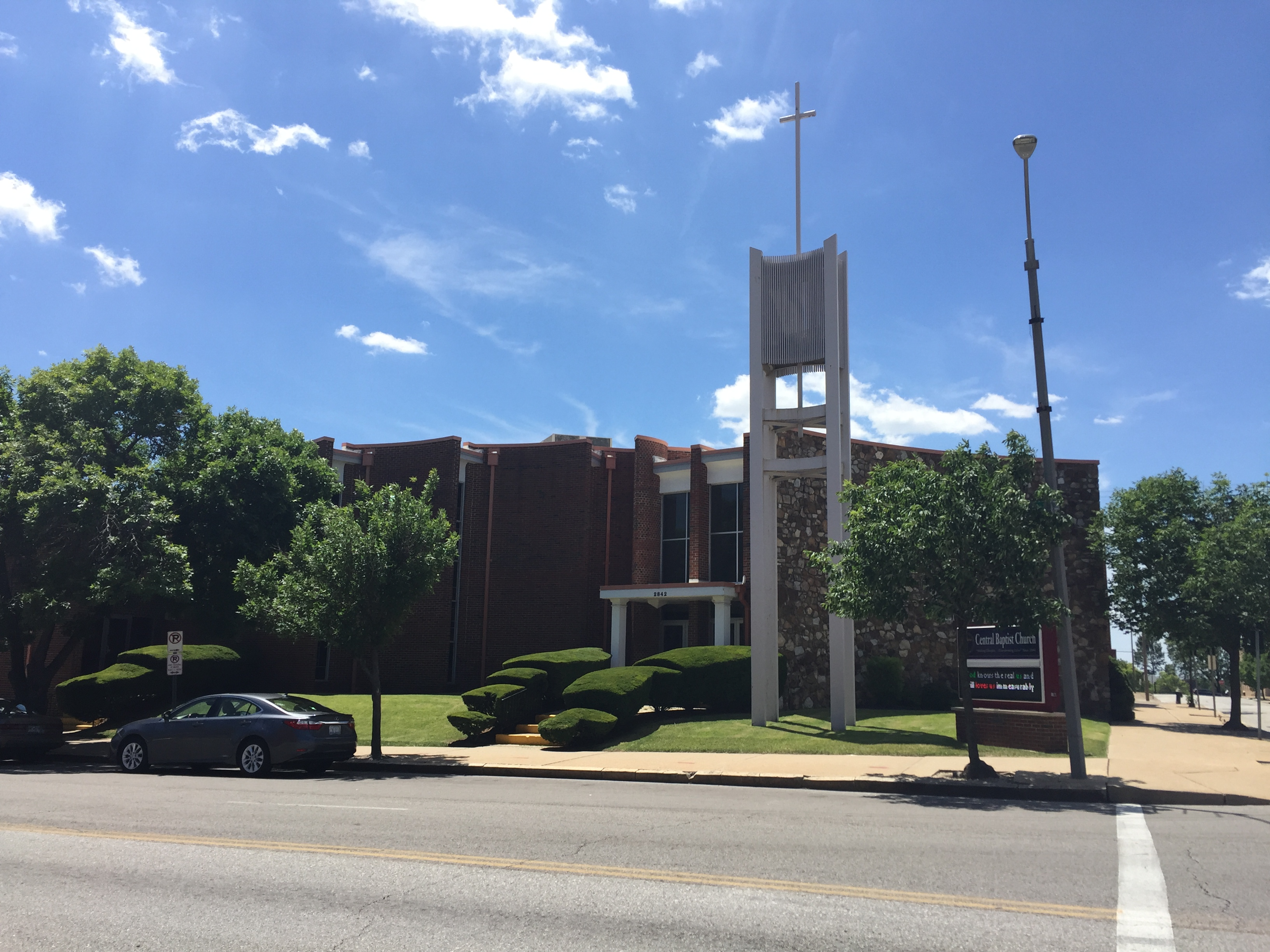
- Central Baptist Church
- 38.636008°N 90.219358°W
- Location: 2842 Washington Blvd., St. Louis, Missouri
- Denomination: National Baptist Convention, USA, Inc.
- Website: www.cbcstl.org

Central Baptist Church in St. Louis, Missouri was founded as the Second African Baptist Church in 1846.

Early pastors were Reverend Richard Sneethen, (1846-1847) and Reverend John Richard Anderson, (1847-1863). The church has an executive pastor and seven associate pastors.

The church celebrated its 170th anniversary on March 4, 2016, with an event where the guest speaker was Reverend Dr. Jerry Young, President of the National Baptist Convention, USA, Inc.

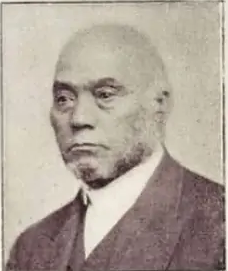
Reverend Richard Sneethen

The church membership in 2016 was about 1,500, with about 750-900 attending services weekly. Its senior pastor from 1999 to 2016, Reverend Dr. Robert C. Scott, left in 2016 to head an even larger congregation in Charlotte, North Carolina. Reverend Anthony L. Riley, began his pastoral leadership at Central Baptist on March 17, 2019 as the 14th senior pastor in its 173-year history.

== See also ==
- First Baptist Church City of St. Louis, founded in 1827 as the First African Baptist Church
