= Floating Freedom School =

Historic school on Mississippi River

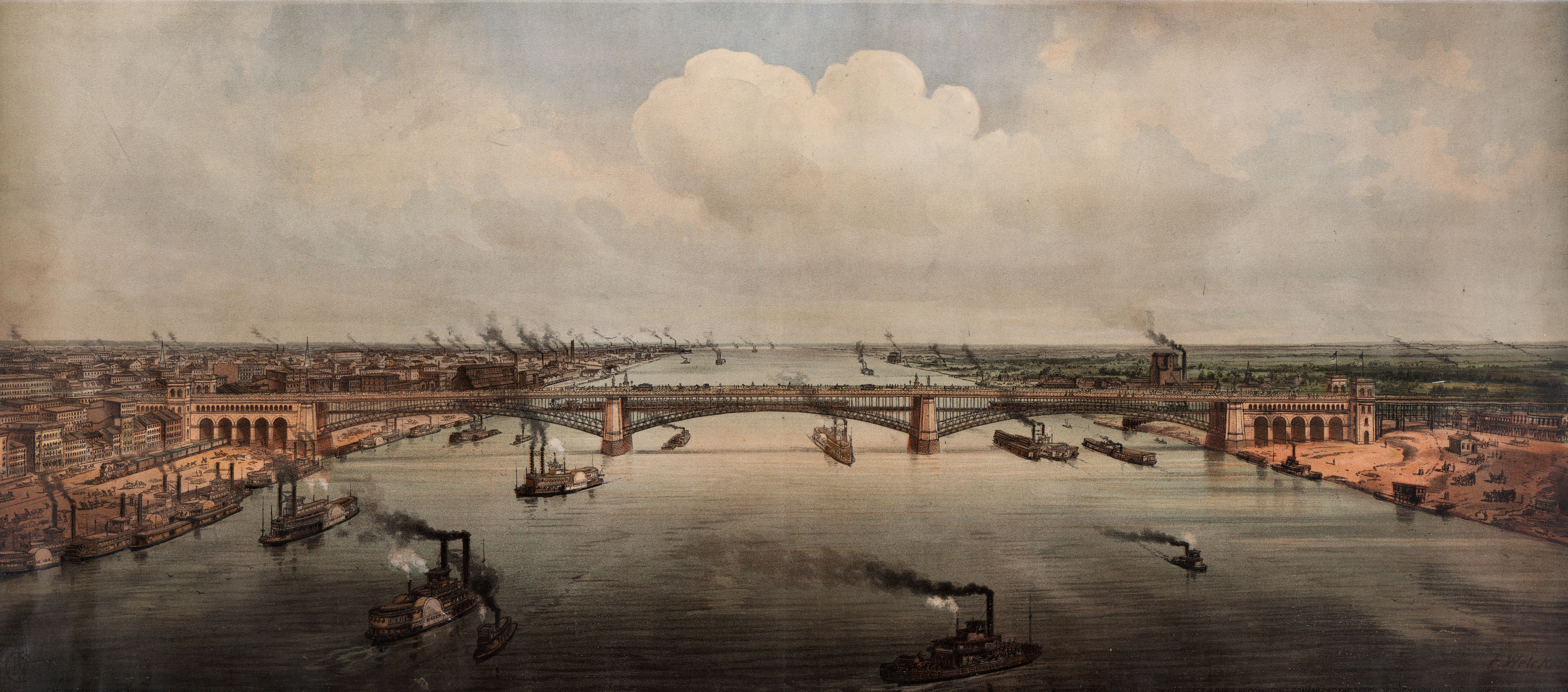
- Riverboats along the Mississippi River at St. Louis, Missouri

Location
- Mississippi River, off the shore of St Louis, Missouri; 38°37′17″N 90°10′43″W (Note: The exact location of where the school was anchored in the Mississippi River is unknown. Possibilities include near where Meachum built steamboats (also unknown), up north near Alton, Illinois, or somewhere else near St. Louis.)

Information
- Established: 1847
- Closed: After 1860

The Floating Freedom School was an educational facility for free and enslaved African Americans on a steamboat on the Mississippi River. It was established in 1847 by the Baptist minister John Berry Meachum. After Meachum's death in 1854, the Freedom School was taken over by Reverend John R. Anderson, a former student, and closed sometime after 1860.

== History ==
In 1847, John Berry Meachum was forced to close the school he had been operating in a St. Louis church basement. Earlier that year, the Missouri legislature had passed a law that made it illegal to provide "the instruction of negroes or mulattoes, in reading or writing". Meachum and one of his teachers were arrested by the sheriff and threatened.

To circumvent the new state law in Missouri, Reverend Meachum bought a steamboat which he anchored in the middle of the Mississippi River, thus placing it under the authority of the federal government. The new floating "Freedom School" was outfitted with desks, chairs, and a library. Students were ferried back and forth between St. Louis and the Freedom School in small skiffs. The school eventually attracted teachers from the East.

Hundreds of black children were educated at the Freedom School in the 1840s and 1850s. Those who could pay were charged one dollar a month. One of the early students was James Milton Turner, who would go on to establish 30 new schools for African Americans in Missouri after the Civil War. Another was John R. Anderson, who received much of his reading and religious training from the school. Reverend Anderson later took over management of the school after Meachum's death in 1854. School attendance dropped off just before the Civil War, with only 155 black children enrolled in 1860.
