= John Berry Meachum =

Baptist minister and educator (1789–1854)

Rev. John Berry Meachum
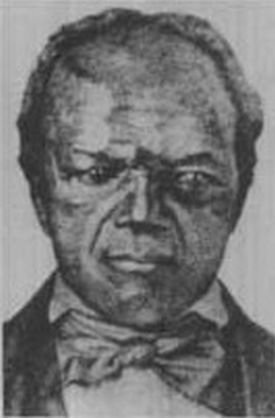
- Born: May 3, 1789; Goochland County, Virginia
- Died: February 26, 1854 (aged 64); St. Louis, Missouri
- Burial place: Bellefontaine Cemetery
- Occupations: Minister, educator, Underground Railroad conductor
- Known for: Floating Freedom School
- Spouse: Mary Meachum

Ecclesiastical career
- Religion: Baptist
- Ordained: 1825
- Writings: An Address to All of the Colored Citizens of the United States
- Congregations: First African Baptist Church, now named First Baptist Church City of St. Louis

John Berry Meachum (May 3, 1789 – February 26, 1854) was an American pastor, businessman, educator and founder of the First African Baptist Church in St. Louis, the oldest black church west of the Mississippi River. At a time when it was illegal in the city to teach people of color to read and write, Meachum operated a school in the church's basement. Meachum also circumvented a Missouri state law banning education for black people by creating the Floating Freedom School on a steamboat on the Mississippi River.

As a young man, he guided 75 enslaved people from Kentucky to their freedom in Indiana, a free state. Once established in Missouri, he and his wife Mary Meachum were conductors on the Underground Railroad. They also purchased enslaved people and took them into their home until they earned enough money to repay their purchase price. The Meachums employed the enslaved people that they purchased and emancipated them when they had saved enough to repay their purchase price. In the meantime, they were also educated and learned skills to be self-sufficient once freed. John and Mary also helped runaway enslaved people across the Mississippi and into Illinois along the Underground Railroad. The Mary Meachum Freedom Crossing in St. Louis, the first site in Missouri to be accepted in the National Park Service's National Underground Railroad Network to Freedom, was named after Mary.

In 1846, Meachum spoke at the National Negro Convention in Philadelphia and published the pamphlet An Address to All of the Colored Citizens of the United States, which stressed the importance of education and self-respect.

== Early life ==
John Berry Meachum was born on May 3, 1789, in Goochland County, Virginia. He was the son of an enslaved Baptist minister named Thomas Granger and an enslaved woman named Patsy. Born into slavery, his slaveholder was Paul Meachum (Mitchem). They moved to North Carolina, and after nine years, they moved to Hardin County, Kentucky. His owner, who Meachum described as a kind man, allowed the young man to be hired out to work at a saltpeter cave. He also earned money as a carpenter. With his share of his earnings, Meachum purchased his freedom when he was 21. Meachum then walked 700 miles to Hanover County, Virginia, and purchased his father's freedom for 100 Virginia pounds. Meachum was baptized in Virginia in 1811. After they accumulated more money, the father and son walked to Kentucky and freed Meachum's mother and siblings. His family settled in Harrison County, Indiana. Remaining in Kentucky, Meachum married an enslaved woman named Mary.

According to Meachum, Paul was more than 100 years of age with 75 slaves when he made Meachum an offer to free his slaves if he would lead them out of Kentucky. He agreed and led the group across the Ohio River to Harrison County, Indiana, where his parents had settled. His parents' neighbors ran the group out of the area and the freed blacks settled elsewhere. According to Wonning, Paul and Susannah Mitchem were an elderly couple when they chose to move to Indiana in 1814 with about 100 enslaved people. Meachum traveled with them. Most of the former slaves settled around the town of Corydon in Harrison County.

When Meachum returned to Kentucky, he learned that his wife's owners had taken her and their children to St. Louis, Missouri. With only three dollars (equivalent to $53 in 2025), Meachum moved to the river port city to be with her in 1815. He saved his earnings as a carpenter, cabinet maker, and cooper to purchase the freedom of Mary and their children. He made a good living in the city as a cooper.

== John ==
=== Minister ===
In St. Louis, Meachum met white Baptist missionaries John Mason Peck and James Welch who established the Sabbath School for Negroes in 1817. Meachum began preaching and assisting the missionaries in 1821. After he was ordained by Rev. Peck in 1825, Meachum constructed a separate building at the same location for the First African Baptist Church and school. Founded in 1827, it was the first black church west of the Mississippi. By that time, there were 220 congregants, 200 of whom were slaves, who required the permission of their owners to attend church. The church continued to grow into the 1840s, when it had 500 parishioners. The First African Baptist Church, now First Baptist Church City of St. Louis, moved to 14th and Clark streets in 1848. (Note: In 1917 it moved again, to its present address at Bell Avenue. The church later purchased the adjacent four-family flat and converted it into an educational building. The church had a fire and burned to the ground in 1940. The congregation had it reconstructed on the same site within thirteen months.)

A deep-toned missionary spirit, uncommon order and correctness among the slave population, and strict and regular discipline in the church, were among the fruits of his arduous and preserving labor.

— Allen's Register, 1835

=== Educator ===
Beginning in 1822, Meachum taught religious and secular classes for free and enslaved African Americans. It was the first known school for blacks in Missouri. Called the Candle Tallow School, it charged those who could pay one dollar per pupil in tuition. Classes were held secretly in the basement of the church.

In 1825, the city had passed an ordinance that banned the education of free blacks. Those in violation of the law could be whipped with 20 lashes, fined, or imprisoned. In 1847, the school was closed down by the police, who arrested Meachum and a white teacher from England. The slave state of Missouri banned all education for black people, one of several restrictions on the lives of both enslaved blacks and free people of color. It also prohibited them from having independent black religious services without a white law enforcement officer present, or from holding any meetings for education or religion. (Note: The statute read as follows: "Be it enacted by the General Assembly of the State of Missouri, as follows: 1. No person shall keep or teach any school for the instruction of negroes or mulattoes, in reading or writing, in this State. 2. No meeting or assemblage of negroes or mulattoes, for the purpose of religious worship, or preaching, shall be held or permitted where the services are performed or conducted by negroes or mulattoes, unless some sheriff, constable, marshal, police officer, or justice of the peace, shall be present during all the time of such meeting or assemblage, in order to prevent all seditious speeches, and disorderly and unlawful conduct of every kind. 3. All meetings of negroes or mulattoes, for the purposes mentioned in the two preceding sections, shall be considered unlawful assemblages, and shall be suppressed by sheriffs, constables, and other public officers.")

In response, Meachum moved his classes to a steamboat in the middle of the Mississippi River, which was subject to federal law and outside of Missouri's jurisdiction. He supplied the riverboat with a library, desks, and chairs, and called it the "Floating Freedom School". This allowed Meachum to resume his educational practices to people of color, free and enslaved, eluding limitations of the then established Southern state laws.

Among Meachum's students was James Milton Turner, who was at the school when Meachum was arrested. He was the consul to Liberia under President Ulysses S. Grant. After the Civil War, he founded the Lincoln Institute, the first school in Missouri for higher education for black students.

=== Entrepreneur ===
Meachum worked as a carpenter and cooper. He purchased enslaved people, who studied under him and worked for him, and saved their earnings. When the bondspeople repaid him, Meachum emancipated them. By 1835, Meachum was worth $25,000 (equivalent to $780,242 in 2025). He built a riverboat with a library and operated it as a temperance boat.

== Life with Mary ==
Meachum married Mary, who was born about 1805 in Kentucky. They had two children, John and William. In 1840, his household consisted of 10 free colored people and six slaves. In 1850, they had eight black people living with them, two of whom were boatsmen.

=== Underground Railroad ===
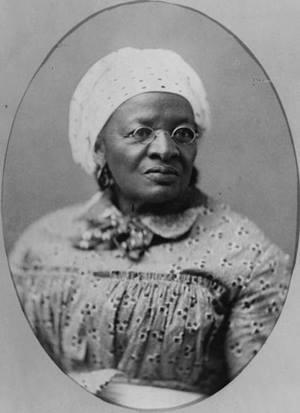
Mary Meachum, abolitionist and Underground Railroad conductor

Meachum and his wife Mary helped enslaved people gain their freedom via he Underground Railroad. They transported people by boat across the Mississippi River to the free state of Illinois. Through profits from his successful businesses, the Meachums purchased and freed enslaved individuals. He provided on-the-job training. He owned two riverboats and operated a barrel-making factory, which was staffed by escaped slaves, who saved up their earnings. Meachum and his wife purchased the freedom of around 20 slaves between 1826 and 1836. Nearly every person that the Meachum's freed paid them back, which provided the money to free others.

By 1846, Meachum had purchased the freedom of 22 individuals and taught them vocational and life skills to be self-reliant. That year, he spoke at the National Negro Convention in Philadelphia. He also published a pamphlet, An Address to All of the Colored Citizens of the United States, in Philadelphia. He emphasized the importance of collective unity and self-respect. He said that black people needed to receive practical, hands-on education so they would could support themselves after emancipation. He punctuated his arguments with Biblical references like Proverbs 22:6: "Train up a child the way he should go and when he is old he will not depart from it." He also wrote,

In order that we might do more for our young children, I would recommend manual labor schools to be established in the different states, so as the children could have free access to them. And I would recommend in these schools pious teachers, either white or colored, who would take all pains with the children to bring them up in piety, and in industrious habits. We must endeavor to have our children look up a little, for they are too many to lie in idleness and dishonor.

— John Berry Meachum

=== Mary's crossing (1855) ===
After his death, Mary continued her work with the Underground Railroad. She and a free Black man named Isaac traveled by a boat with nine slaves across the Mississippi River to Illinois, a free state, on May 21, 1855. Once they reached the shore, they were arrested and went to jail for violating the Fugitive Slave Act of 1850. On May 24, she was charged with slave theft. The charges against Isaac were dropped. The Missouri Republican reported on July 19, 1855, that Mary was tried by a jury and acquitted of at least one charge, and the remaining charges were dropped. (Note: One scholar says Meachum was sold into slavery in Vicksburg, Mississippi, after her arrest.)

=== The Colored Ladies Soldiers' Aid Society ===
Mary Meachum was president of the Colored Ladies Soldiers' Aid Society in St. Louis. Because Black people were not allowed to ride streetcars at that time, the women negotiated with the streetcar company to ride the streetcar one day a week, on Saturdays, to allow the members of the ladies' aid society to visit wounded soldiers at the segregated wing of the Hospital at Benton Barracks in St. Louis.

=== Death ===
John Berry Meachum died in his pulpit on February 26, 1854. (Note: Brenc states that he died on February 19, 1854.) He is buried in Bellefontaine Cemetery in St. Louis. Mary Meachum died in St. Louis on August 8, 1869. She is memorialized with her husband in Bellefontaine Cemetery in St. Louis.

== Legacy ==
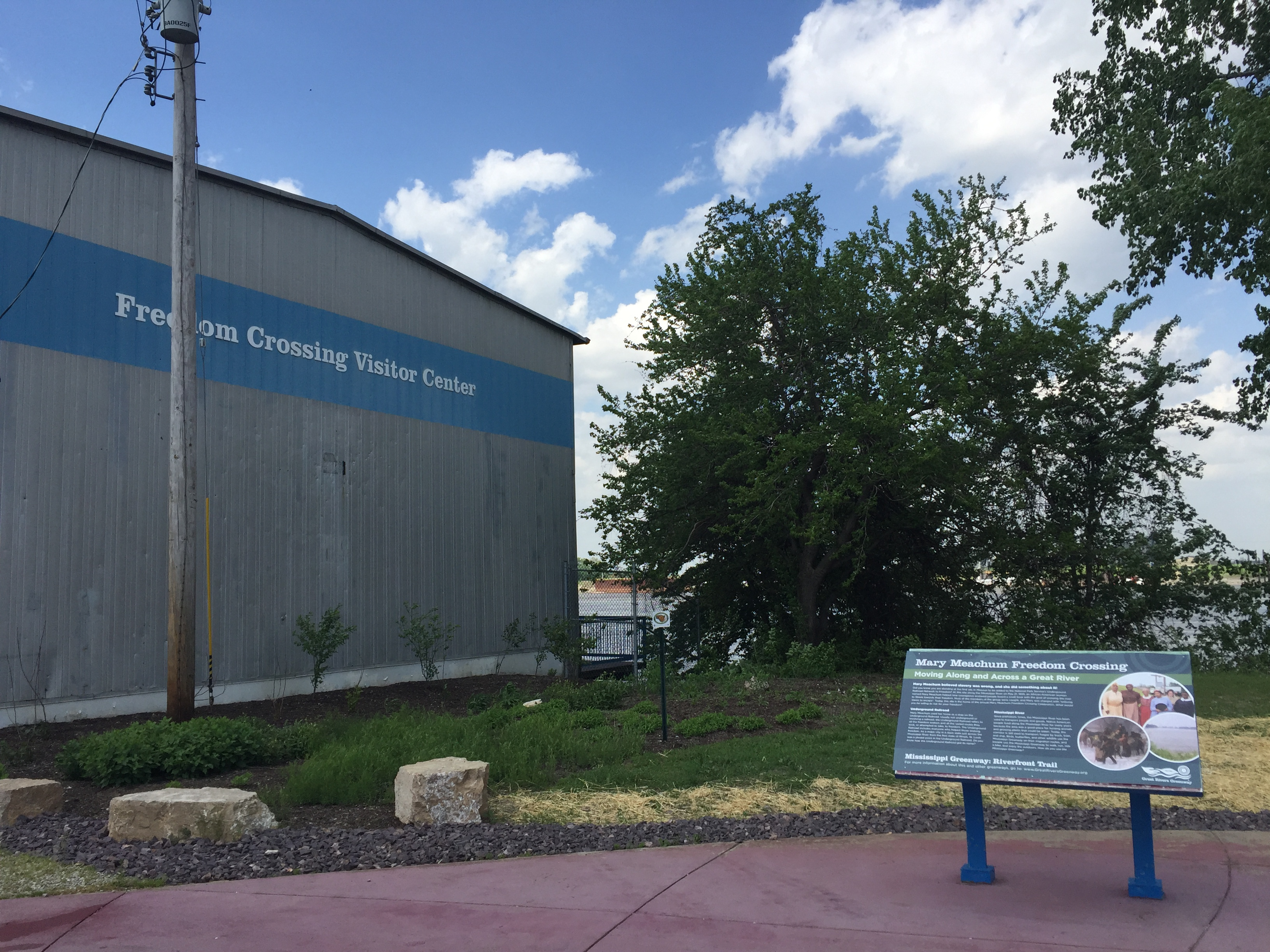
Mary Meachum Freedom Crossing, May 2018

- The Mary Meachum Freedom Crossing, part of the National Park Service's National Underground Railroad Network to Freedom, was dedicated, Nov 1, 2001, in a special ceremony on the Riverfront Trail. Since then, it has hosted the annual Mary Meachum Freedom Crossing Celebration, an event which includes re-enactments of Mary Meachum's river crossing and arrest. The site is located just north of the Merchants Bridge in St. Louis. (Note: In 2014, plans were underway to expand the site to a national historical monument to the Underground Railroad, which would include interpretive towers, a wall of names, and healing gardens.)
- The John Berry Meachum Scholarship was established at the Saint Louis University to recognize Meachum's work as a minister, founder of the oldest black church in Missouri, educator, and businessman. The scholarship is awarded to medical students at the university.
- The Meachum School of Haymanot is a theological school named after John Berry and Mary Meachum.
