= National Register of Historic Places listings in Bureau County, Illinois =

Location of Bureau County in Illinois

This is a list of the National Register of Historic Places listings in Bureau County, Illinois.

This is intended to be a complete list of the properties and districts on the National Register of Historic Places in Bureau County, Illinois, United States. Latitude and longitude coordinates are provided for many National Register properties and districts; these locations may be seen together in a map.

There are 19 properties and districts listed on the National Register in the county.

This National Park Service list is complete through NPS recent listings posted July 31, 2026.

== Current listings ==
	Name on the Register	Image	Date listed	Location	City or town	Description
1	Allen School	Allen School	February 16, 1996 (#96000081)	301 Main St. 41°31′47″N 89°16′48″W	La Moille	
2	First Congregational Church of LaMoille	First Congregational Church of LaMoille	February 16, 1996 (#96000059)	94 Franklin St. 41°31′51″N 89°16′47″W	La Moille	
3	First State Bank of Manlius	First State Bank of Manlius	May 12, 1975 (#75000639)	Northern side of Maple St. 41°27′24″N 89°40′11″W	Manlius	
4	Greenwood Cottage	Greenwood Cottage	May 9, 1983 (#83000301)	543 E. Peru St. 41°22′20″N 89°27′22″W	Princeton	
5	Hampshire Colony Congregational Church	Hampshire Colony Congregational Church	August 28, 2018 (#100002821)	604 S Church St. 41°22′09″N 89°27′45″W	Princeton	
6	Hennepin Canal Historic District	Hennepin Canal Historic District	May 22, 1978 (#78003433)	West to Moline then north to the vicinity of Rock Falls; 41°23′04″N 89°41′35″W	Hennepin	
7	Lone Tree School	Lone Tree School	May 12, 2004 (#04000418)	19292 250 North Avenue; 41°11′11″N 89°29′11″W	Tiskilwa	
8	Owen Lovejoy Homestead	Owen Lovejoy Homestead	May 24, 1973 (#73000690)	Peru St. (U.S. Route 6); 41°22′18″N 89°26′55″W	Princeton	
9	Old Danish Church	Old Danish Church	October 2, 1973 (#73000691)	Southeastern corner of the junction of Cook and Washington Sts. 41°21′27″N 89°44′06″W	Sheffield	
10	Oakland Cemetery Historic District	Oakland Cemetery Historic District	September 1, 2021 (#100006864)	1007 N. Main St. 41°21′59″N 89°29′00″W	Princeton	
11	Colonel George H. Paddock House	Colonel George H. Paddock House	December 17, 2021 (#100007222)	906 South Main St. 41°21′57″N 89°27′54″W	Princeton	
12	Princeton Chapter House	Princeton Chapter House	November 28, 1980 (#80001338)	1007 N. Main St. 41°23′05″N 89°27′53″W	Princeton	
13	Princeton North Main Street Historic District	Princeton North Main Street Historic District	January 18, 2018 (#100001968)	Primarily 900-1000 blocks of N Main & 000 blk. of W Long Sts. 41°23′04″N 89°27′54″W	Princeton	
14	Princeton South Main Street-Courthouse Square Historic District	Princeton South Main Street-Courthouse Square Historic District	January 18, 2018 (#100001969)	Primarily 500 & 600 blocks of S Main St. & Courthouse Sq. 41°22′07″N 89°27′54″W	Princeton	
15	Red Covered Bridge	Red Covered Bridge	April 23, 1975 (#75000640)	2 miles north of Princeton off Illinois Route 26 on Old Dad Joe Trail; 41°24′59″N 89°28′43″W	Princeton	
16	Richard M. Skinner House	Richard M. Skinner House	February 10, 1983 (#83000302)	627 E. Peru St. 41°22′18″N 89°27′13″W	Princeton	
17	Stevens House	Stevens House	November 5, 1992 (#92001537)	140 E. Main St. 41°17′31″N 89°30′22″W	Tiskilwa	
18	Village Hall	Village Hall	January 2, 2013 (#12001112)	239 S. Main St. 41°21′24″N 89°44′15″W	Sheffield	
19	Wood-Tellkamp House	Wood-Tellkamp House	January 24, 1995 (#94001599)	82 Main St. 41°32′00″N 89°16′49″W	La Moille	

== See also ==
- List of National Historic Landmarks in Illinois
- National Register of Historic Places listings in Illinois
