= Ichabod Spencer =

American preacher and author (1798–1854)

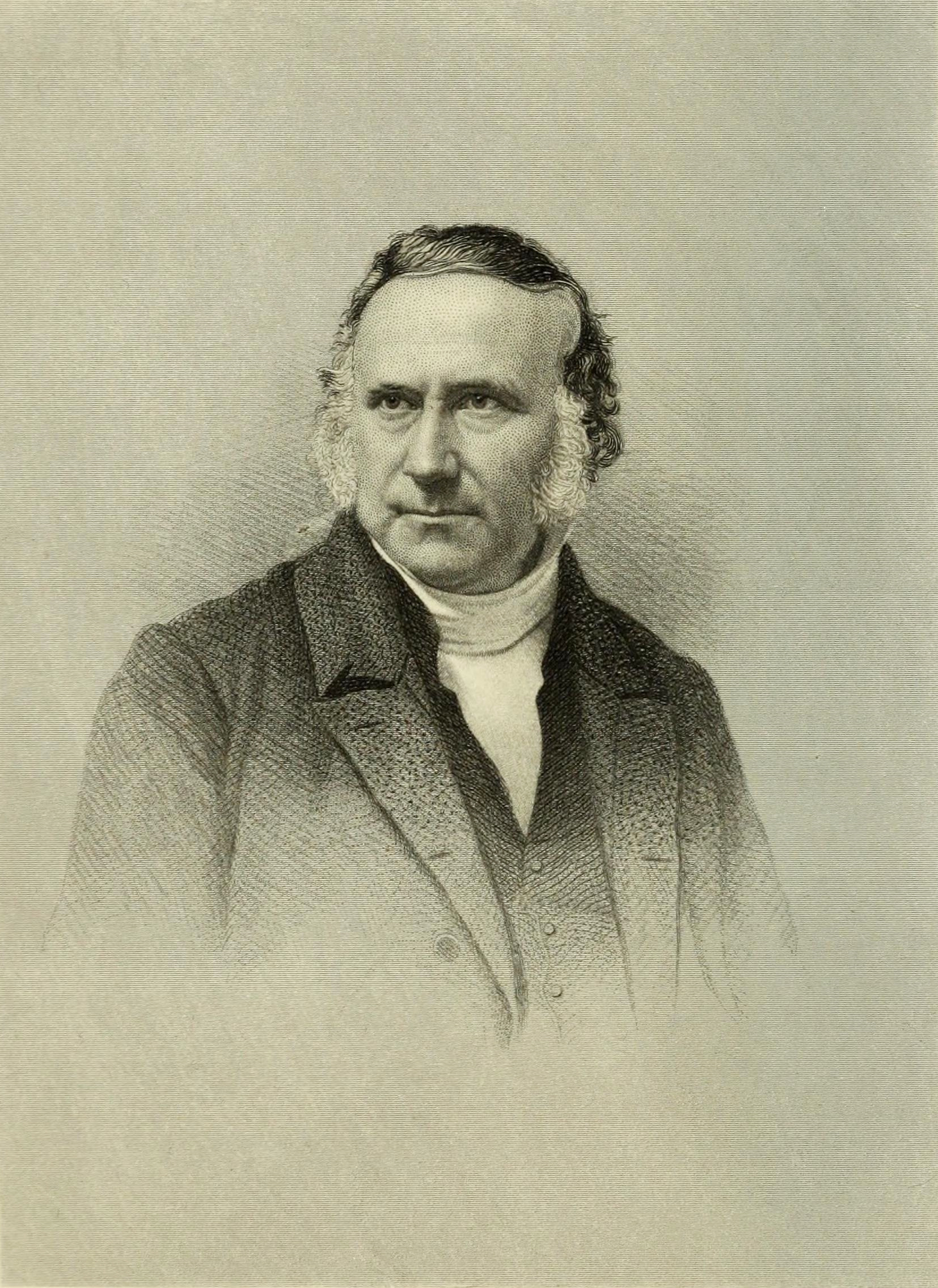
Rev. Ichabod S. Spencer

Ichabod Smith Spencer (February 23, 1798 – November 23, 1854) was a popular 19th-century American Presbyterian preacher and author.

Spencer was descended from Thomas Spencer, an early settler of Hartford, Connecticut, who died in 1687. Around 1786, Spencer's father moved to the Rupert, Bennington, County, Vermont. Spencer was born there, the youngest but one of eleven children. Those who knew Spencer in his youth contended that "he belonged to the class of careless, thoughtless, and gay young men". His father, a farmer, died while Spencer was young, and he thereafter moved to Granville, Washington County, New York, where he engaged in manual labor for something like a year. During this year, a revival of religion visited this town, and Spencer became a Christian. He was encouraged to enter the ministry, and undertook to do so. He entered Union College in 1819, graduating in 1822. He considered a career in law, and spent some time studying for the bar, but ultimately decided to become a minister, and was licensed as such in November, 1826.

In May 1828, Spencer married Hannah Magoffin, and in the summer of 1828, he accepted an offer to minister at the Congregational Church in Northampton, Massachusetts. There, Spencer gained distinction as a preacher, and in the spring of 1832 he was solicited to move to the Second Presbyterian Congregation of Brooklyn, where he was installed on March 23, 1832. Spencer remained in Brooklyn for the rest of his life, where he wrote extensively, and "published verbatim reports of pastoral conversations that other ministers could use as a guide".

Spencer has been characterised by some as "pro-slavery", for among his most prominent works was The Religious Duty of Obedience to the Law, which specifically called for obedience to the Fugitive Slave Law, contending that resistance to the slave law constituted "positive rebellion against government; and either the resistance must be crushed, or the government be overturned".

== See also ==
- Hampshire Colony Congregational Church
