= Oakland Cemetery (Princeton, Illinois) =

- Oakland Cemetery Historic District
- U.S. National Register of Historic Places
- U.S. Historic district
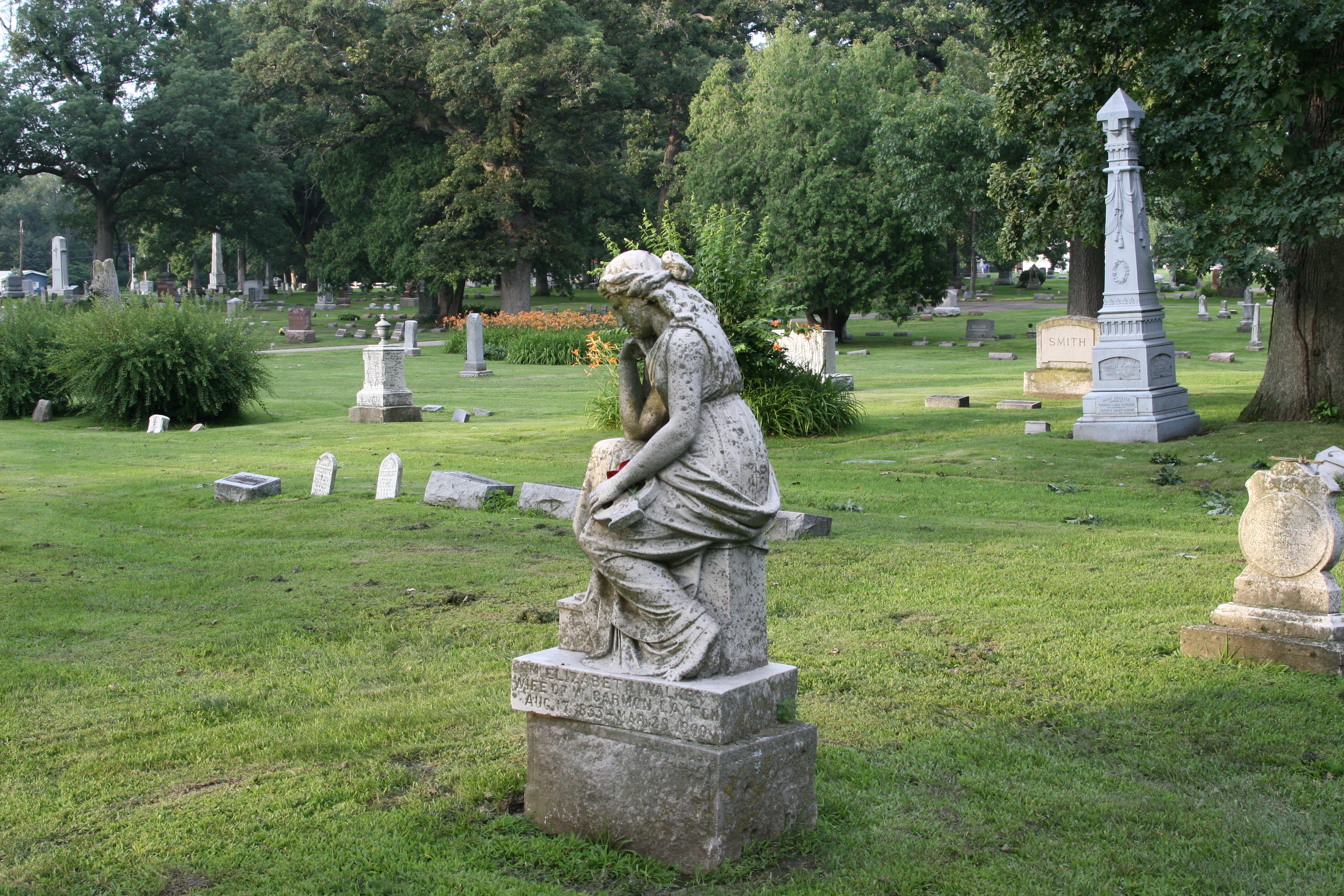

- Location within Illinois Location within the United States
- Location: 1007 N. Main St., Princeton, Illinois
- Coordinates: 41°21′59″N 89°29′00″W
- NRHP reference No.: 100006864
- Added to NRHP: September 1, 2021

Oakland Cemetery is a historic cemetery at 1007 North Main Street in Princeton, Illinois. The cemetery originated in 1836, five years after Princeton's founding, and was originally owned by Reverend Lucien Farnham as a burial ground for members of the Hampshire Colony Congregational Church. The city of Princeton leased the burial ground from the church in 1862 and bought a large plot of adjacent land, and by the next year they had combined the two plots and named them Oakland Cemetery after the oak trees there. Landscape architect L.L. Herron and surveyor Romanus Hodgman planned the grounds as a garden cemetery, a park-like style of cemetery which had become popular in the eastern United States at the time. The cemetery included a public picnic area, carriage paths, and a Gothic Revival office building. Many of the graves in the cemetery feature large, artistic monuments, including obelisks made from white bronze, statues of angels or the deceased, stone tree trunks, and Art Deco box tombs. The largest monument in the cemetery marks the grave of pioneer and local historian Nehemiah Matson; it is 34 feet (10 m) tall and made of 44 tons of granite, and it cost $4,600 when it was built in 1884.

The cemetery was added to the National Register of Historic Places on September 1, 2021, as the Oakland Cemetery Historic District.
