= Owen Lovejoy House =

Historic house in Illinois, United States

- Owen Lovejoy Homestead
- U.S. National Register of Historic Places
- U.S. National Historic Landmark
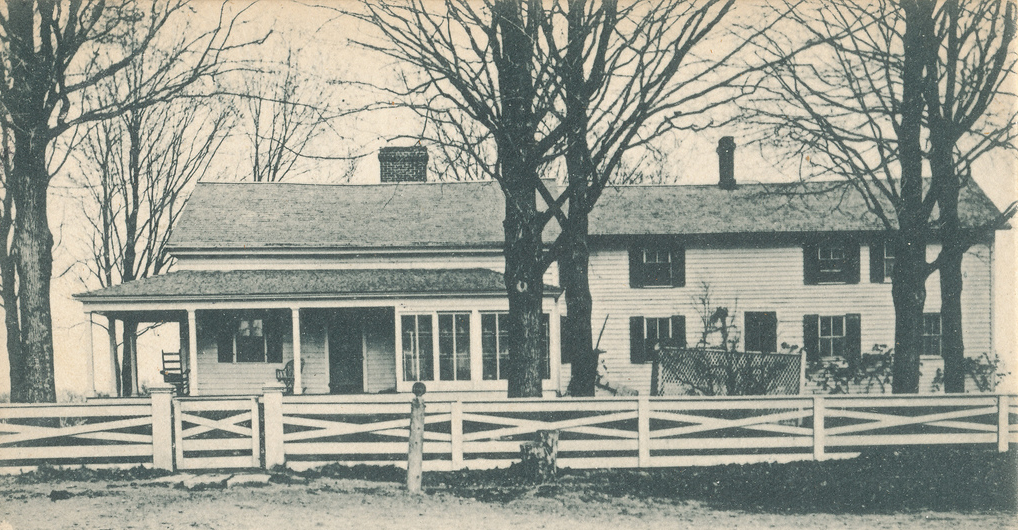
- Owen Lovejoy Homestead, c. 1905

- Location within Illinois Location within the United States
- Location: Peru St. (U.S. Route 6), Princeton, Illinois
- Coordinates: 41°22′18″N 89°26′55″W
- Built: 1838
- NRHP reference No.: 73000690

Significant dates
- Added to NRHP: May 24, 1973
- Designated NHL: February 18, 1997

The Owen Lovejoy House is a historic house museum on East Peru Street in Princeton, Illinois. Built in 1838, it was for many years home to Owen Lovejoy (1811–1864), a prominent abolitionist and congressman. Lovejoy, the brother of martyred abolitionist, Elijah Lovejoy, was an open operator of shelter and support on the Underground Railroad, and his house contains a concealed compartment in which escaped slaves could be hidden. It was declared a National Historic Landmark in 1997. It is open seasonally or by appointment for tours.

== Description and history ==
The Owen Lovejoy House stands on the outer fringe of the developed town center of Princeton, on the north side of East Peru Street between 7th and 8th Streets. It is a 1 1/2-story wood-frame structure, with a gabled roof and vernacular Greek Revival styling. The left half of its broad front is sheltered by a hip-roofed porch, which wraps around the left side. An ell extends to the rear of the building. On the second floor is an attic space that has been traditionally ascribed the role as a fugitive hiding place. It is a triangular space running along the back of the main block, whose presence is obscured by the arrangements of the walls on the back staircase. The space appears to have been deliberately constructed in this way, and it is not obviously amenable for use as a more conventional storage space.

The main part of the house was built in 1835 by Butler Denham, who had acquired land here the previous year. It was expanded soon afterward to the rear, and again about 1850 to the east. Denham, a Massachusetts native, farmed here and died in 1841. His wife Eunice remarried, to Owen Lovejoy, a fiery abolitionist lawyer from Maine. Lovejoy was a prominent organizer of abolitionist activity in Illinois, and helped organize the state Republican Party with Abraham Lincoln in 1854. He notoriously flaunted his assistance to fugitive slaves in anti-slavery speeches he made to the public and on the floor of the United States Congress.

Lovejoy's house remained in the family until 1931, when it was sold to a couple who performed a partial restoration, and attempted to operate it as a museum. The effort failed, and the house declined in condition. It was acquired by the city in 1971, and underwent a major rehabilitation over the next year. It has been operated by the city since then as a history museum.

== See also ==
- List of Underground Railroad sites
- Lovejoy State Memorial
- List of National Historic Landmarks in Illinois
- National Register of Historic Places listings in Bureau County, Illinois
