= This Is America (disambiguation) =

"This Is America" is a 2018 song by Childish Gambino.

This Is America may also refer to:

== Music ==
- This Is America (album), a 1968 album by Kim Weston, or the title song
- This Is America, a 2013 album by Ashton Shepherd
- "This Is America", a 2015 song by Justin Tranchita

== Other uses ==
- This Is America (book), a 1942 book by Eleanor Roosevelt and Frances Cooke Macgregor

== See also ==
- This Is America, Charlie Brown, a 1988–1989 animated television miniseries
- This Is America with Jon Elliott, a 2006–2009 Air America radio show
- This Is America Tour, 2018/9 concert tour by Childish Gambino
- This Is America & the World with Dennis Wholey, a 1998 interview program
- "This Is Not America", a 1985 David Bowie song
- "This Is Not America" (Residente song), a 2022 song by Residente, featuring Ibeyi
- Who Is America?, a 2018 television series created by Sacha Baron Cohen
- "This Is Australia", an 'Australian version' of Childish Gambino's 2018 song
