= WZIV =

- Princeton, Illinois; United States
- Frequency: 90.7 MHz
- Branding: Z90.7

Programming
- Format: Christian hot AC/classic hits

Ownership
- Owner: Road Map Ministries
- Sister stations: WZTN (89.9 MHz) Cornersville, Tennessee

History
- First air date: August 2005 (as WPRC at 88.3)
- Former call signs: WPRC (2002–2012); WUNT (2012–2020)
- Former frequencies: 88.3 MHz (2005–2020)
- Call sign meaning: WZ-Illinois Valley

Technical information
- Licensing authority: FCC
- Facility ID: 90548
- Class: A
- ERP: 650 watts
- HAAT: 96 meters (315 ft)
- Transmitter coordinates: 41.281°N 89.586°W

Links
- Public license information: Public file; LMS
- Webcast: Listen live
- Website: ChristianHitsZ907.com

WZIV (90.7 FM) is a Christian hot adult contemporary, classic hits radio station located in Princeton, Illinois. It is a listener-supported radio station owned by Road Map Ministries. The Class A, 650-watt signal near Providence, Illinois, serves the LaSalle-Peru radio market.

== History ==
The station was first built and signed on by the Illinois Bible Institute as WPRC, rebroadcasting WCIC from Pekin, in August 2005.

In 2009, Road Map Ministries received a construction permit from the FCC to build a new FM station on 88.7 MHz to serve Sheffield with 8,500 watts power and a directional antenna at 417 feet HAAT. The call letters WUNT—for "unity"—were assigned.

Near the time the construction permit was about to expire, an agreement was reached between Road Map Ministries and Illinois Bible Institute to trade the higher-power construction permit on 88.7 MHz for the lower-power station already licensed on 88.3 MHz. The WPRC and WUNT call letters were swapped between the facilities.

WUNT, now on 88.3 MHz, soon went silent and remained off the air for nearly a year while a studio facility was constructed in Sheffield. It then launched as "Community Christian Radio", evolving into a contemporary Christian station as "Roadmap Radio 88.3" and then to "88-3 The Roadmap" as a contemporary Christian hot AC/CHR outlet on December 26, 2018. The WUNT studio moved to its current location at 105 S. Main St. Suite 3 in Princeton in 2017.

In April 2020, the FCC approved the station's frequency change to 90.7 MHz and a power increase to 650 watts. The format was launched on Friday morning at 9:07am on October 23, 2020, at which time the station became WZIV "Z90.7" with a Christian hot adult contemporary format and an expanded playlist of Christian classic hits.
