= Clayton C. Pervier =

American politician

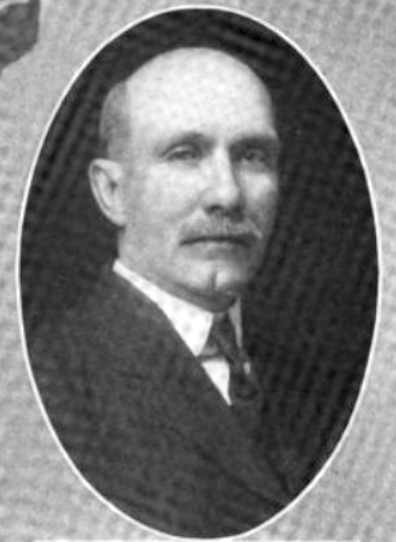

Member of the Illinois Senate
- In office 1914–1922

Member of the Illinois House of Representatives
- In office 1906–1914

Personal details
- Born: Clayton Covell Pervier; March 4, 1857 Mineral Township, Bureau County, Illinois, US
- Died: November 19, 1929 (aged 72) Sheffield, Illinois, US
- Party: Republican
- Education: University of Illinois
- Occupation: Farmer, teacher, politician

Clayton Covell Pervier (March 4, 1857 – November 19, 1929) was an American farmer, teacher, politician, and newspaper editor.

== Biography ==
Pervier was born in Mineral Township, Bureau County, Illinois. He went to the Bureau County public schools and the University of Illinois. Pervier was a farmer and taught school. He lived in Sheffield, Illinois with his wife and family. Pervier was the associate editor for the Farmers Review and wrote about agricultural conditions in various countries in Europe for the Farmers Review. Pervier served on the Bureau County Board of Supervisors and was chairman of the county board. Pervier was a Republican. He served in the Illinois House of Representatives from 1907 to 1915 and then served in the Illinois Senate from 1915 to 1923. Pervier died from a heart attack at his home in Sheffield, Illinois.
