= Aleta Fenceroy =

American activist

- Born: Aleta Jean Ballard; December 27, 1948; Princeton, Illinois
- Died: September 23, 2006 (aged 57); Omaha, Nebraska
- Occupations: Musician, programmer, activist
- Notable work: Fenceberry

Aleta Jean Ballard Fenceroy (December 27, 1948 – September 23, 2006) was an American musician, computer programmer, and activist. A church organist by profession, she was also co-publisher of Fenceberry, an early internet newsletter of LGBT information.

== Early life ==
Aleta Jean Ballard was born in Princeton, Illinois, the daughter of M. Stanley Ballard and Letha Sidebottom Ballard. Her father was a Methodist clergyman and a World War II veteran. She graduated from Riceville High School in 1964. She studied music at Morningside College, and earned an MFA in organ performance from the University of Minnesota. In 1998 she earned an associate's degree in computer programming from Western Iowa Tech Community College.

== Career ==
Fenceroy worked at the Iowa Department of Corrections, and was an application developer at First Data Resources in Omaha, Nebraska. She was also a church organist for 30 years in Iowa City, Iowa. She sang with, and was accompanist for, the River City Mixed Chorus in Omaha. She was also musical director of shows at the Lamb Productions Dinner Theatre in Sioux City, and composed music for children's shows at Lamb Productions' Hot Dog Theater.

In 1990s, Fenceroy and her partner, Jean Mayberry, were described as "the most visible homosexual people in Sioux City". Fenceroy served on the Sioux City School District's educational equity committee. She and Mayberry started a newsletter of LGBT information. It was originally a printed newsletter, assembled and distributed locally from their home in Iowa City, but in 1993, they started a daily email-based version, called Fenceberry based on their surnames. From 1993 to 2004, their subscriber base grew to more than a thousand readers. "It didn't start out as service for other people," Mayberry explained. "We wanted the information ourselves." In 1999 they were named as "an indispensable part of gay politics" in The Advocate's "Our Best and Brightest Activists" feature. They were never paid for the project, and decided to retire the service in 2004, to turn their attention to other projects, including the John Kerry presidential campaign.

== Personal life ==
Aleta Ballard and James Fenceroy married in the 1960s; they had two children, Michelle and Jeremy. She and the children lived in Norway for four years in the 1970s. She and Mayberry were among the 2000 couples unofficially married by Troy Perry at a mass ceremony on the steps of the Internal Revenue Service Building during the March on Washington in 1993. She died in 2006, at the age of 57, from cancer.
