= James E. Dabler =

American politician and businessman

James E. Dabler (July 26, 1854 – October 5, 1922) was an American politician and businessman.

Dabler was born in Wabash, Indiana. He moved with his parents to a farm, in Princeton, Illinois. Dabler went to the Princeton public schools. He worked for a furniture manufacturing company and then sold hardware and farm machinery in Princeton. Dabler served in the Illinois House of Representatives in 1905 and 1906 and was a Democrat. Dabler died at a hospital in Princeton, Illinois from typhoid fever.
