= Greenwood Cottage =

Historic house in Illinois, United States

- U.S. National Register of Historic Places
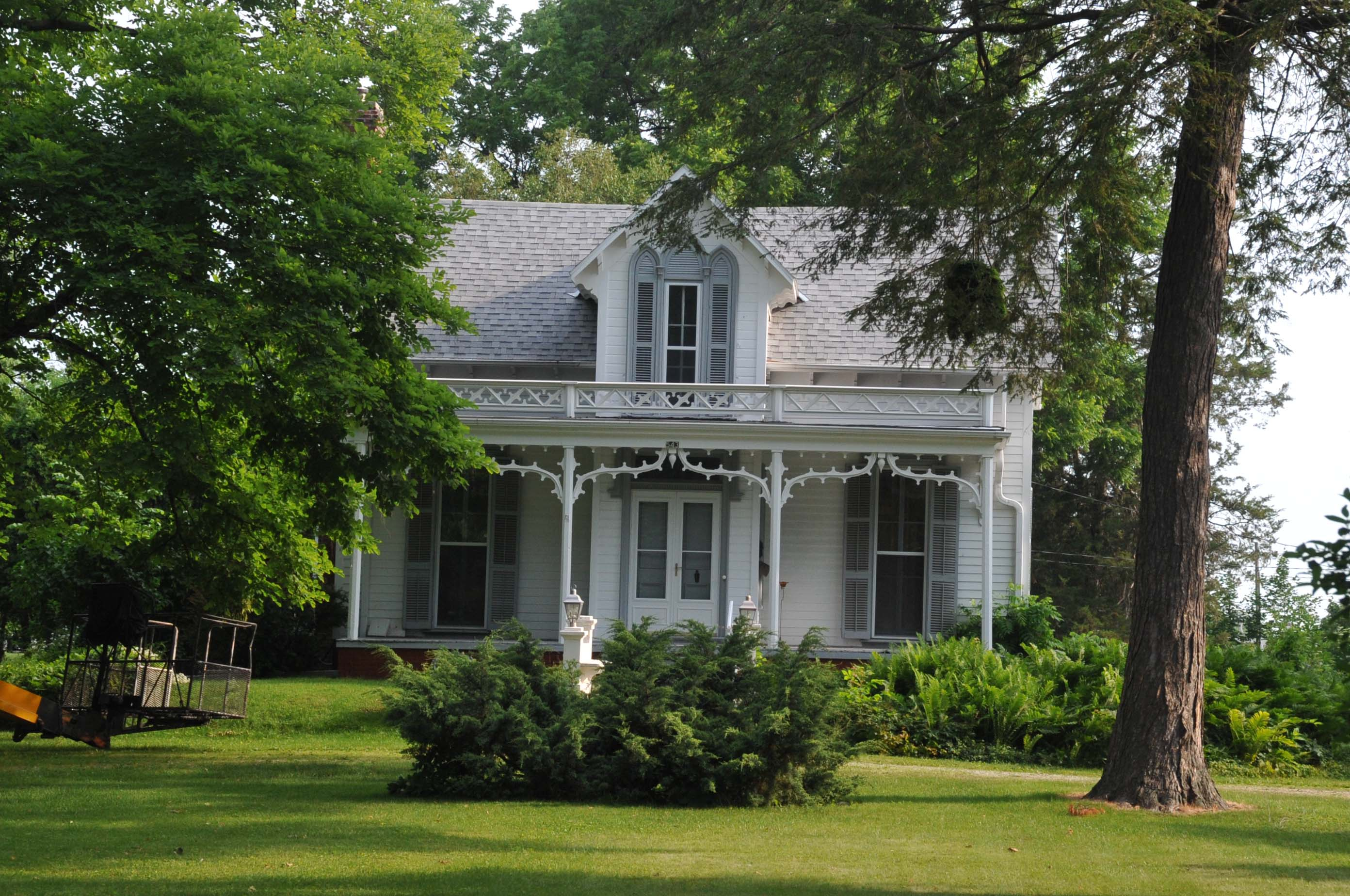

- Location within Illinois Location within the United States
- Location: 543 E. Peru St., Princeton, Illinois
- Coordinates: 41°22′20″N 89°27′22″W
- Area: 0.1 acres (0.040 ha)
- Built: 1852
- Architect: Martin, Abel
- Architectural style: Gothic Revival
- NRHP reference No.: 83000301
- Added to NRHP: May 9, 1983

Greenwood Cottage is a historic house located at 543 East Peru Street in Princeton, Illinois. The house was built in 1852 for Princeton lawyer Joseph Innskeep Taylor. Architect Abel Martin built the Gothic Revival home to the specifications of a design in Andrew Jackson Downing's Architecture of Country Houses. The clapboard house features a front porch with gingerbread bargeboard, a balustrade along the porch roof, and lancet windows on the second floor. Taylor planned the house's landscape, which features both native and exotic trees arranged in a natural setting. The grounds of the house also include an English garden with a Gothic arched entrance.

Among the holdings are portraits of Taylor and his wife Sarah, painted by Junius Sloan in the 1850s.

The house was added to the National Register of Historic Places on May 9, 1983.
