= William V. Thompson =

American professional and champion tenpin bowler

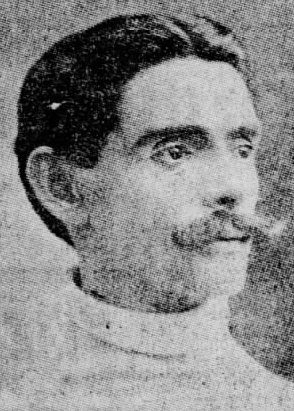
- Thompson in 1909
- Born: April 25, 1865; Princeton, Illinois, U.S.
- Died: September 30, 1938 (aged 73)
- Years active: 1891–1921
- Known for: Champion tenpin bowler
- Notable work: Rules for tenpin bowling

William V. Thompson (April 25, 1865 – September 30, 1938) was an American professional and champion tenpin bowler. He was the proprietor of Plaza Bowling Alley in the Chicago Plaza Hotel, the first official regulation ten-pin bowling alley. He formed a bowling club from champion bowlers and challenged other organizations across the nation. Thompson was influential in forming of the ultimate sanctioned regulations rules of the game and an advocate of the original American Bowling Congress. He was general manager of the department at Brunswick-Balke-Collender Company that made the bowling equipment for the alleys.

== Biography ==
Thompson was born in Princeton, Illinois on April 4, 1865. While in his teens he was part of the high-school sprinters. Thompson was on the Princeton Tigers football team in his early twenties. His first career job was as a railroad man in his early twenties. Around 1911 he picked up an interest in ten-pin bowling, a new game at the time.

Thompson became an expert champion bowler of Chicago in the late nineteenth and early twentieth-century. Thompson had his own team called the Chicago Colts. He was in charge of the champion bowlers of Chicago at this time and set up tournaments with other organizations around the United States.

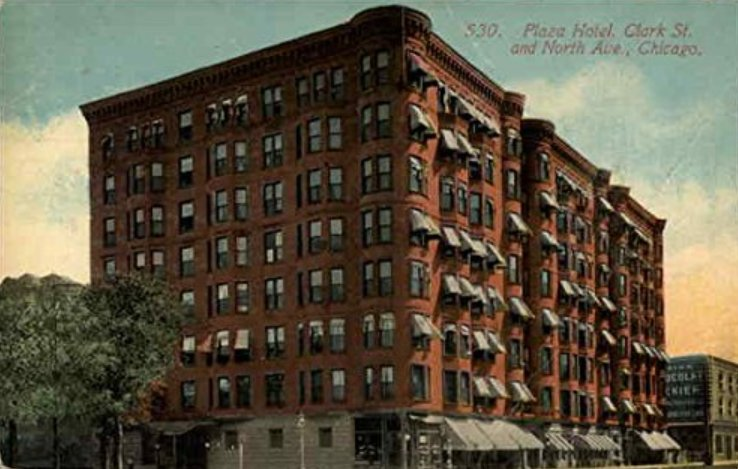
Chicago Plaza Hotel had Plaza Bowling Alley

In 1889 Thompson owned a bowling alley in the basement of the Plaza Hotel located in north Chicago at Clark Street. In 1891 he started to upgrade his slate alleys to a larger size and wood construction. His design was adopted in 1892 as the standard regulation type and size for future alleys of ten-pin bowling. The Plaza Bowling Alley was the first official regulation bowling alley and others followed in its footsteps.

Thompson was nicknamed "W.V." in the bowling circles throughout the United States. He formed a bowling club in 1894 at the Plaza Hotel from the champion bowlers of the Plaza Bowling Alley. His club challenged other clubs across the nation that had regulation bowling alleys that were developing at the time. Arrangements for cash prizes and trophies for these contests were through the Brunswick-Balke-Collender Company.

== Accolades ==
Thompson was labeled by many as the "Father of Bowling" for his efforts to get the new game of ten-pin bowling to standardized rules that all would follow for fair contests. Many details concerning rules and regulations had to be worked out for contests and tournaments (i.e. pin size, pin positioning, ball specifications, lane dimensions, foul line, penalties). Thompson helped formulate these and promoted the new game more than any other person during this time in its early stages of development. Thompson, however, preferred not to be called the "Father of Bowling" so was given the title "Dean of Bowling" instead for his involvement in promoting the game to tournament standards.

Thompson was the manager of the manufacturing department at Brunswick-Balke-Collender Company that made the majority of the equipment for the game. He worked directly under and was closely associated with Brunswick's president Moses Bensinger. He managed Brunswick's All-Star bowling team on promotional tours around the United States. Thompson was sent by Bensinger as a counselor to England, France and Germany to help launch the new game to Europeans and introduce Brunswick's bowling products. He showed them the American hook for making strikes.

== Clubs and associations ==
Thompson was a major contributor to the forming of the ultimate sanctioned rules and regulations of tenpin bowling that became the by-laws of American Bowling Congress (ABC). He was known in the Eastern United States as the protector of the ABC and its bylaws for regulation tenpin bowling. He became the vice-president of the ABC in 1900 and continued for the next five years. The by-laws governing the rule on the regulations of the balls, pins, and alleys were updated several times through his efforts. From time to time various bowling associations that Thompson worked with eventually joined the ABC and followed their by-laws.

Thompson assisted in setting up a world's bowling championship tournament at the St. Louis World's Fair in 1904. By 1909 he was well known in the bowling field worldwide.

Thompson was associated with the Illinois Bowling Association in the early 1900s. He was also associated with the New York Rotary Club at that time and helped organize contests for most of the Rotary Clubs throughout the United States. Thompson often bowled with Mrs. Gertrude Hull, the women's national champion of America at the time.

== Sources ==
Media related to William V. Thompson at Wikimedia Commons

- Colby, Frank Moore (1900). The International Year Book. Dodd, Mead. p. 132.
- Pfister, Gertrud (October 18, 2013). Gymnastics. Routledge. ISBN 978-1-317-96542-8.
