= Olive Percival =

American artist and writer

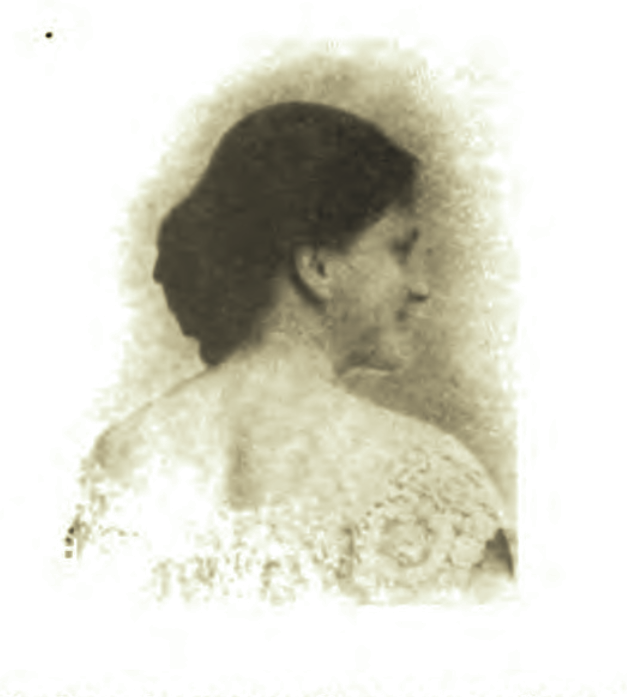
Olive Percival

Olive May Graves Percival (July 1, 1868 – February 18, 1945) was a writer, photographer, gardener, artist, and bibliophile in Los Angeles. Although she earned her living as an insurance clerk, she wrote for a variety of magazines, authored several books, and was sought after as a lecturer on gardens, New England antiques, Japanese ceramics, and children’s books, among other subjects.

== Early years ==
Percival was born near Sheffield, Illinois, in a log cabin on her family’s farm. Growing up, there was tension between her parents, most likely as result of debt related to the family farm. Her older brother, Leo, remained disconnected from the family, and Percival's father died when she was ten. In 1887, she moved to Los Angeles with her mother and sister, lured by the climate and the prospect of year-round gardening. Her sister, Edna, died when she was 17 in 1893 leaving Percival to spend much of the next fifty years with her mother, Helen Mason Percival.

== Down-hyl Claim ==
Percival began work as a saleswoman in the People’s Store (later a branch of the May Company California) before joining the fire agency firm of McLellan & Golsh. In 1895, she joined the Home Insurance Company as a clerk and remained there for more than thirty years. Despite her modest salary, which never exceeded $150 a month, she built a home called the Down-hyl Claim in the Arroyo Seco (Los Angeles County), a scenic area northeast of Los Angeles, often described as an artists’ colony. Oddly, when she built her home, she did not have it wired for heat or electricity. Instead, it was lit with oil lamps and candles and warmed by fires in the fireplace.

Her home was often the setting for garden teas, moon-viewing parties, and memorable salons attended by local and visiting celebrity authors, artists, and book lovers. Her diaries from 1889 to 1943 are peopled with artists, actors, writers, society leaders, career women, and others active in the intellectual life of Los Angeles during that time. One guest thought of the occasions as a mingling of “the inconvenient and the cultivated.”

== Writing ==
Percival began writing for publication in 1896 and sold her first poem and first article just before her 28th birthday. Eventually, she began to regularly contribute to the Los Angeles Times, writing articles on subjects ranging from women’s suffrage to gardening. After the Los Angeles Times bombing in 1910, she penned an article titled Would Woman's Vote Suppress Anarchy, which appeared in the October 16, 1910, issue:

If ever we needed the full representation of the whole people in government affairs, that need is terribly emphasized by this distressing occurrence. As for equal suffrage, I have never in my life heard one sane argument against it. I think the only argument that men who are opposed to the measure have ever advanced in justification of their unfair and un-American position, is that they do not want women to lose their delicacy and charm by rough contact with matters political. This is not 'sentiment' but sentimentality. . . . There is no sense or intelligence about it. Women must live in the world as truly as men and in many instances they are as well equipped for the actualities of life as men. . . .

If there is to be anything democratic or republican about the government of America, that independence must be based upon the liberty of all of its citizens. . . . When half of the people of any country are disenfranchised, that country has no freedom. We pretend to be progressive and we boast our splendid republicanism, but our republic is more despotic than any monarchy unless all who are taxed have a voice in the control of public affairs.

Her books include Leaf-Shadows and Rose-Drift, Being Little Songs from a Los Angeles Garden (1911) and Mexico City: An Idler’s Note-Book (1901) which featured some of her own photographs and was reviewed favorably. In her will, she arranged for the publication of two of her manuscripts, Our Old-fashioned Flowers (Pasadena, CA 1947) and Yellowing Ivy (Los Angeles, CA 1946). In 2005, the Huntington Library Press published excerpts from her book-length manuscript Children’s Garden Book, as Olive Percival’s Children’s Garden Book. The Huntington Library has seven hundred of her photographs, many of which are a record of her garden. Others are of scenes in Mexico, Los Angeles, San Pedro, and San Francisco. She often printed them herself—purposely on blueprint paper—because the colors reminded her of Oriental porcelain.

In 1949, Los Angeles nurseryman Paul Howard patented an Olive Percival Rose. It was chosen to honor the teachers of America and planted at the White House.

Although she achieved some success as a writer, she often lamented to her diary the fact that she was not able to make a living as a writer.

== Book, Art and Doll Collections ==
Percival accumulated notable book and art collections, many of which are now in three Southern California libraries: Ella Strong Denison Library, The Libraries of the Claremont Colleges, the Huntington Library, Art Collections, and Botanical Gardens and Library Special Collections in the Charles E. Young Research Library at the University of California, Los Angeles, CA.

In "Different Images, Portraits of Remembered People," author Hildegarde Flanner writes this of Percival:

"It was in 1915 in Los Angeles that I first met Miss Olive Percival. More properly, let me say, I had the honor to be presented. She was a prominent figure in Southern California, a well-known hostess, a collector of books and art. She was an authority on Oriental art and also early American antiques. She collected both. She had a fine collection of textiles, bookplates, and exquisite paper dolls. Her library of children's books was one of the best in America. She was a direct descendant of Gov. William Tracy of Virginia. In the midst of her scrupulously filed and arranged ten thousand good books she was a very important person, intellectually and socially, at a time in the history of Los Angeles when such possessions as hers represented conspicuous achievement and impeccable position."

Percival also collected old hats while making new ones. Her hat making extended to her dolls, for whom she made nearly two hundred little hats. She also made paper dolls, inspired by a letter about antique paper dolls from Wilbur Macey Stone, an authority on children’s literature and toys. The Denison Library now houses over 300 of Percival’s dolls, clothes, and other accessories.

== Chinese and Japanese collections ==
Percival was considered an authority on many aspects of Chinese and Japanese art, lending pieces from her collections of prints, porcelain, scroll paintings, lacquer, bronzes, sword guards, and stencils to local art groups for special exhibitions.

Her interest in the Japanese and their culture lead her to protest anti-Japanese measures, such as the California Alien Land Law of 1913 discriminating against the Japanese. During World War II, she stored the belongings of her Japanese friends when they were sent to internment camps. To counteract the charges of some friends who accused her of being un-American, she joined the Daughters of the American Revolution, the American Society of Colonial Families, and the Mayflower Society. This did not stop her from also belonging to the Japan Society of the UK, the Japan Society (New York), the local Japan-American Club, and the Japanese-American Woman's Club.

== Death ==
Olive Percival died on February 19, 1945, after suffering from a stroke a few months earlier in her garden. Lawrence Clark Powell paid tribute to her after she died:

In spite of an income limited to her clerk's earnings and from the occasional sale of articles, this woman, whose name was Olive Percival, collected beautiful things so assiduously that, after her death, it took an appraiser two weeks to inventory the contents of her cottage. . . . What a pity that she lacked the wealth and the leisure of a Huntington or a Morgan.
