= Colonel George H. Paddock House =

Historic house in Illinois, United States

- U.S. National Register of Historic Places
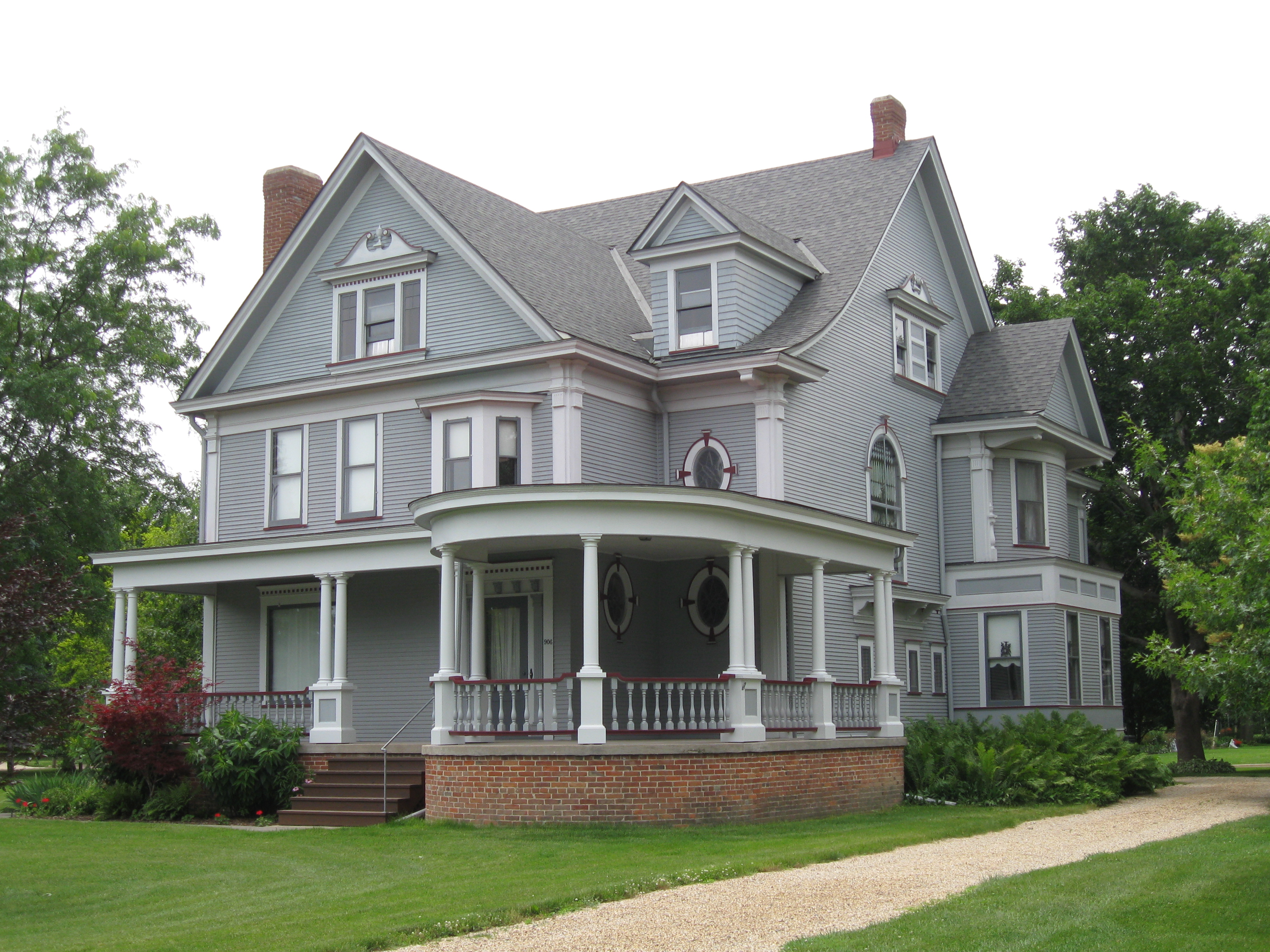

- Location within Illinois Location within the United States
- Location: 906 S. Main St., Princeton, Illinois
- Coordinates: 41°21′58″N 89°27′57″W
- Built: 1903
- Architectural style: Queen Anne, Neoclassical
- NRHP reference No.: 100007222
- Added to NRHP: December 17, 2021

The Colonel George H. Paddock House is a historic house at 906 South Main Street in Princeton, Illinois. Built in 1903, the house was designed with elements of the Queen Anne and Neoclassical styles. As is typical of Queen Anne buildings, the house has an asymmetrical shape with a complex cross-gabled roof. The front of the house features a wraparound porch supported by Doric columns. The house's windows include both stained glass windows and projecting bay windows typical of the Queen Anne style and pedimented triple windows typical of Neoclassical architecture.

The house was added to the National Register of Historic Places on December 17, 2021.
