= Richard M. Skinner House =

Historic house in Illinois, United States

- U.S. National Register of Historic Places
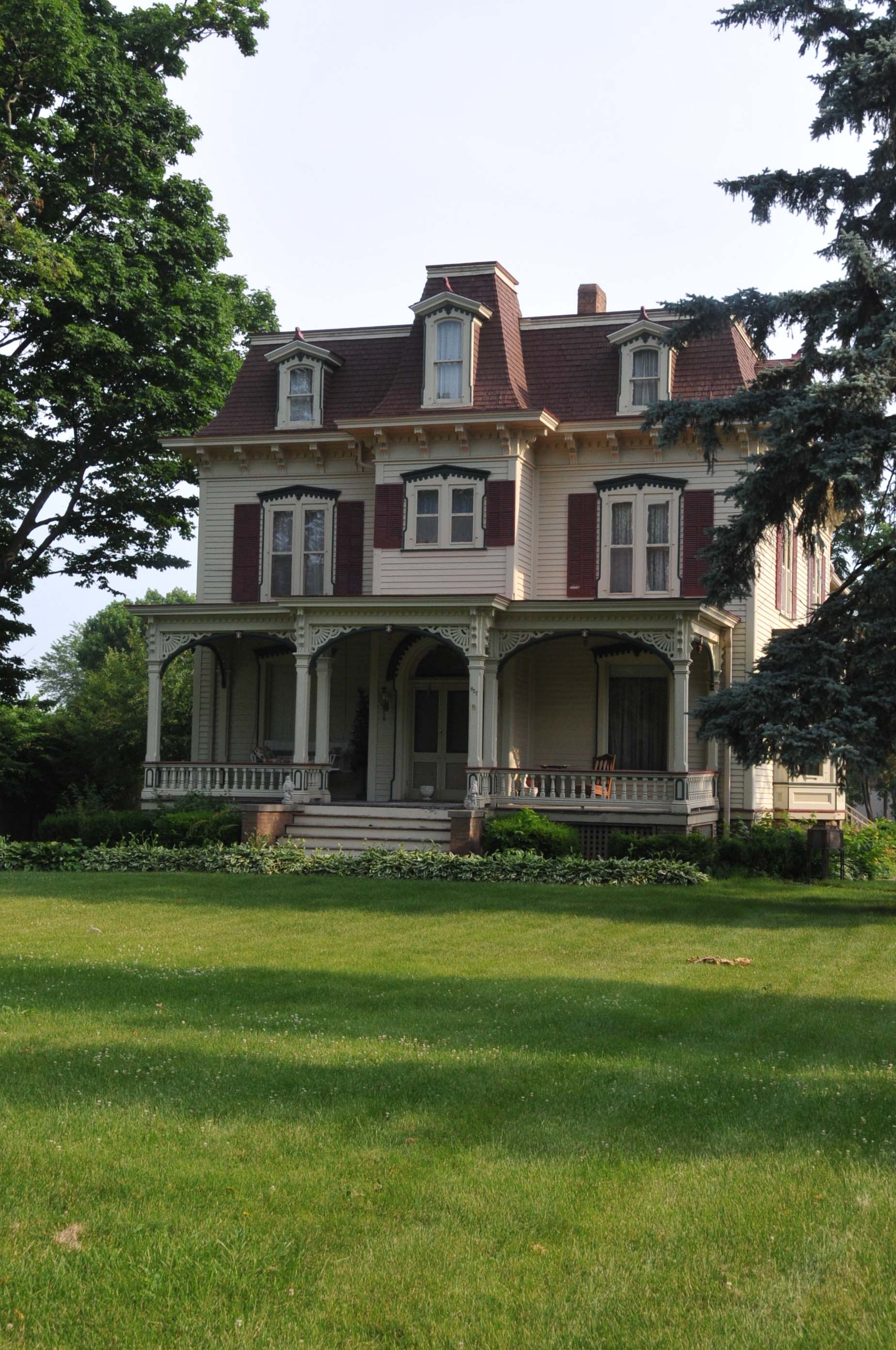

- Location within Illinois Location within the United States
- Location: 627 E. Peru St., Princeton, Illinois
- Coordinates: 41°22′18″N 89°27′13″W
- Area: 1 acre (0.40 ha)
- Built: 1878
- Architect: Bryant, Joseph Plummer
- Architectural style: Italianate, Second Empire
- NRHP reference No.: 83000302
- Added to NRHP: February 10, 1983

The Richard M. Skinner House is a historic house located at 627 East Peru Street in Princeton, Illinois. Built in 1878, the house was designed by Princeton architect Joseph Plummer Bryant. Bryant's design was largely a Second Empire work but also included Italianate elements. The house has a mansard roof, a characteristic Second Empire feature, with a projecting central pavilion at the front entrance; seven dormers project from the roof. The roof's cornice is bracketed, displaying the design's Italianate influence. A veranda along the front of the house features detailed moldings along the edge of the roof and a balustrade along the bottom.

The house was added to the National Register of Historic Places on February 10, 1983.
