= Princeton North Main Street Historic District =

Historic district in Illinois, United States

- U.S. National Register of Historic Places
- U.S. Historic district
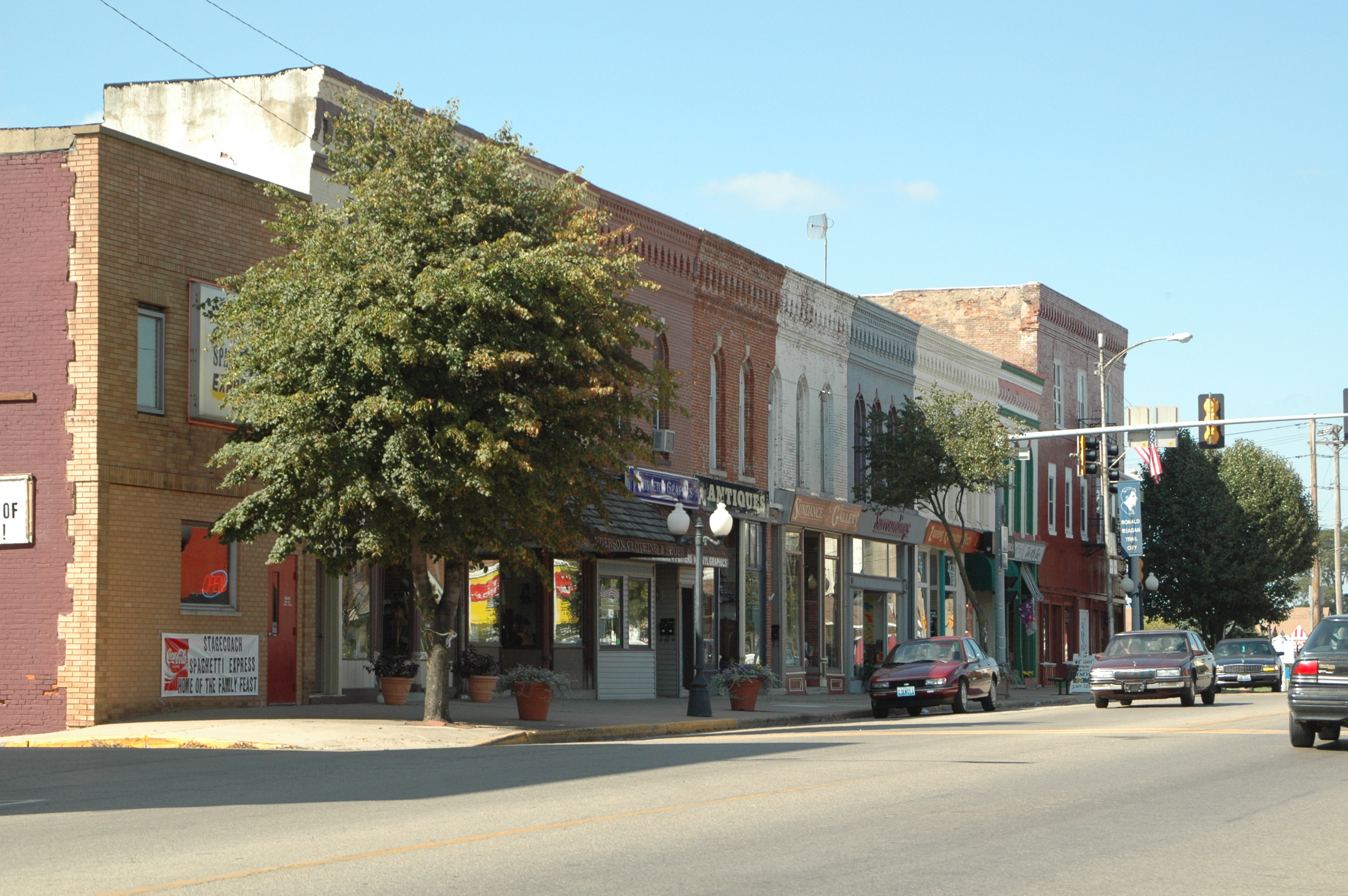

- Location within Illinois Location within the United States
- Location: Primarily 900-1000 blocks of N Main & 000 blk. of W Long Sts., Princeton, Illinois
- Coordinates: 41°23′04″N 89°27′54″W
- NRHP reference No.: 100001968
- Added to NRHP: January 18, 2018

The Princeton North Main Street Historic District is a national historic district in Princeton, Illinois. The district is centered on North Main Street and encompasses one of Princeton's two historic downtown areas, the other of which is along South Main Street. Development in the area began when Princeton's railroad station opened there in 1854, and it continued through the mid-twentieth century. As the railroad mainly brought agricultural businesses and other functional stores to the area, North Main Street gained a reputation as being less fashionable than South Main Street. The district's buildings reflect popular architectural styles of the period; Italianate and Arts and Crafts architecture is especially common, but Queen Anne, Prairie School, and Mission Revival buildings are also present.

The district was added to the National Register of Historic Places on January 18, 2018.
