= Princeton South Main Street-Courthouse Square Historic District =

Historic district in Illinois, United States

- U.S. National Register of Historic Places
- U.S. Historic district
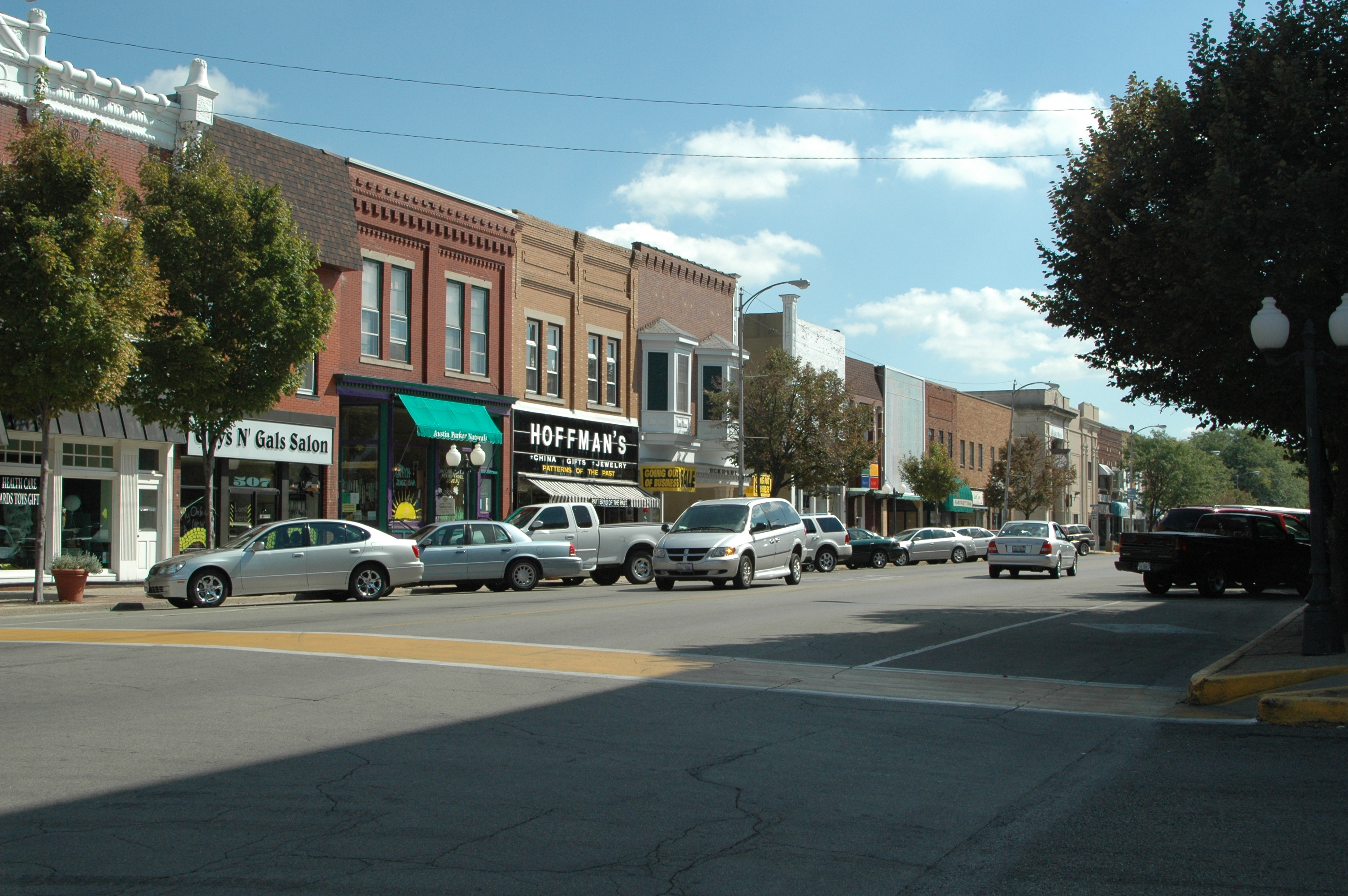

- Location within Illinois Location within the United States
- Location: Primarily 500 & 600 blocks of S Main St. & Courthouse Sq., Princeton, Illinois
- Coordinates: 41°22′07″N 89°27′54″W
- NRHP reference No.: 100001969
- Added to NRHP: January 18, 2018

The Princeton South Main Street-Courthouse Square Historic District is a national historic district in Princeton, Illinois. Centered on South Main Street and the Bureau County Courthouse, the district is the older of the two downtown areas in Princeton, with the other being on North Main Street. Development in the area began with the settlement of Princeton in the 1830s and continued through the mid-twentieth century. The courthouse square was established when the county's first courthouse opened in 1845; the current Art Moderne courthouse was built there in 1937. South Main Street was considered the more upscale of Princeton's two downtowns, as it lacked the functional and agricultural businesses associated with the city's railroad station. The district's buildings reflect the popular architectural styles of the nineteenth and twentieth centuries; Italianate and Arts and Crafts designs are especially common, though Green Revival, Queen Anne, Neoclassical, Prairie School, and Moderne buildings are also present.

The district was added to the National Register of Historic Places on January 18, 2018.
