= Game of Pawns (game show) =

American television game show

Game of Pawns is a television game show based in Branson, Missouri, about the goings on in a local pawn shop. The show stars; Justin Tranchita, Scott Velvet and Brian Roman. The plot of the show is a mix of a game show and reality television series as Scott and Brian buy unusual items at Branson Pawn using a trivia game to give patrons the chance to win more for their item all while Justin gets into trouble and goofs off making the days at Branson Pawn move along with a little more excitement. Dealing in everything from celebrity cars to antique guns, they never know just what – or who – will walk through the door next. At Branson Pawn, every day’s a gamble. Scott and Brian give each customer three questions. If they get two of the three right, the customer gets their price. If not, the house wins and Brian and Scott get their price. This show runs on the Discovery Channel globally as re-runs and had its debut in 2013 with eight original episodes.

== Production ==
Game of Pawns was produced by Highnoon Entertainment, a production company in Denver, Colorado, that has produced many hit reality television shows, such as: Cake Boss, Fixer Upper, Tough Love and others. Jim Berger and Scott Feely were the executive producers for the series.
