= Stevens House (Tiskilwa, Illinois) =

Historic house in Illinois, United States

- U.S. National Register of Historic Places
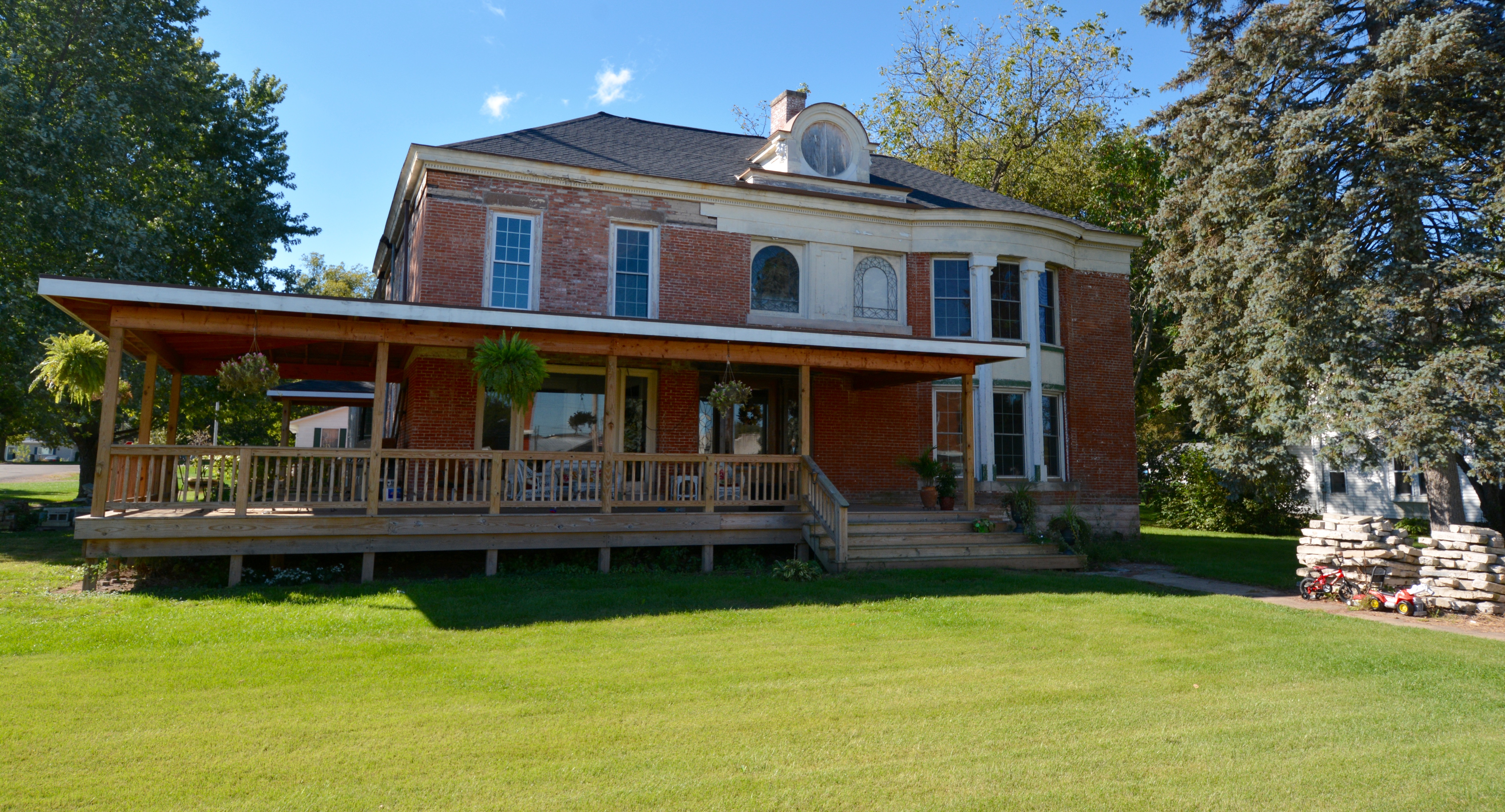

- Location within Illinois Location within the United States
- Map showing the location of Stevens House
- Location: 140 E. Main St., Tiskilwa, Illinois
- Coordinates: 41°17′31″N 89°30′22″W
- Area: less than one acre
- Built: 1842
- Architectural style: Classical Revival, Greek Revival
- NRHP reference No.: 92001537
- Added to NRHP: November 5, 1992

The Stevens House is a historic house located at 140 East Main Street in Tiskilwa, Illinois.

== History ==
John Stevens, a wealthy local businessman, built the house in 1842. The original house had a Greek Revival design highlighted by a full porch with columns. In 1910, the house was redesigned in the Classical Revival style, bringing it in line with contemporary trends. The house's new features included a new porch, a bay window with Classical columns, a dormer projecting from the front of the roof, and a frieze and cornice.

The house was added to the National Register of Historic Places on November 5, 1992.
