= Justin Tranchita =

American singer-songwriter

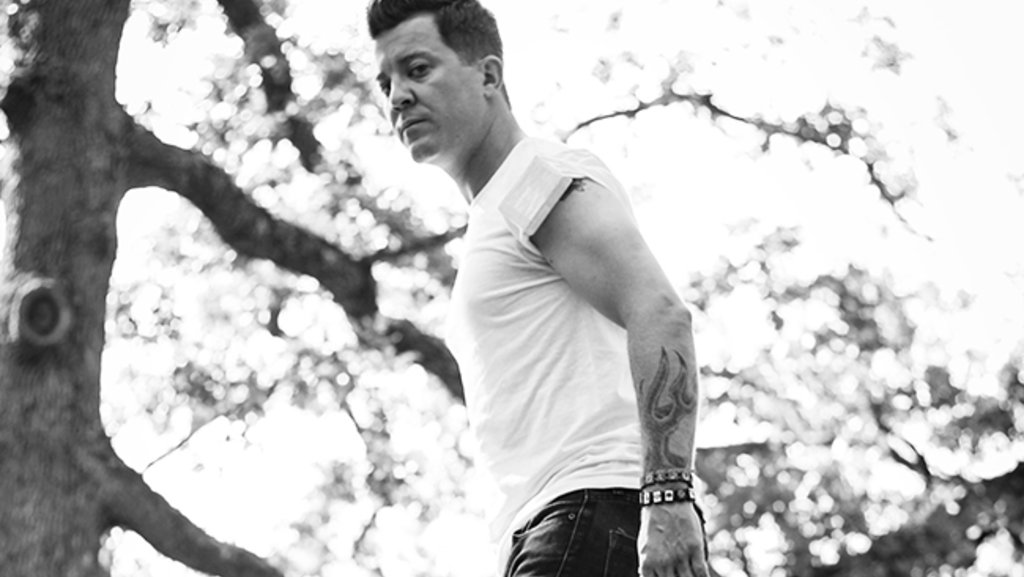

Background information
- Born: Justin Chase Tranchita; June 22, 1981 (age 45); Geneva, Illinois, US
- Genre: Country
- Occupation: Singer-songwriter
- Instruments: Vocals, guitar
- Years active: 2011–present
- Label: Fools Parade
- Website: justintranchita.com

Justin Chase Tranchita (born June 22, 1981) is an American singer, songwriter, actor, and businessman. Born in Geneva, Illinois, and raised in Princeton, Illinois. He achieved popularity by his recurring role on Game of Pawns and his music.

== Life and career ==
=== Early life and career beginning ===
Justin was born to Joseph James Tranchita and Julee Ann Child in Geneva, Illinois, on June 22, 1981. His paternal grandfather was an immigrant from Marsala, Italy, while his mother was of Jewish and Irish ancestry. He has four elder siblings, Joe (born 1971), Julie (born 1974), Pam (born 1976) and Angie (born 1978) and four younger siblings, Jonathan (born 1983), Elliott (born 1990), Joshua (born 1995) and Marie (born 2000).

He was raised in Princeton, Illinois, just past the Red Covered bridge on a farm with animals surrounded by corn fields. He attended Princeton High school and played football for the school but due to his parents religious beliefs he was pulled out of attendance and home schooled after his sophomore year. Tranchita went on several humanitarian trips as a boy taking him all over America and twice to Israel. After his parents divorced his senior year in high school Tranchita had a crisis of faith and left Princeton. He later told the Bureau County Republican that "It was kind of a long road out of Princeton but it was the best place a kid could grow up. "

Justin received a music scholarship to Greenville College and attended in 1999. In 2000 he dropped out of college and relocated to Branson, Missouri where he met Don Williams brother of American singer Andy Williams and Robert Vinton son of American singer Bobby Vinton who helped Justin take the leap into a career in music and television.

=== Television and music ===
Tranchita starred on the television series Game of Pawns which airs on the Discovery Channel globally. The series was filmed in 2013 by High Noon Entertainment and is based on the goings on in a pawn shop in Branson, Missouri. Justin is joined by Scott Velvet and Brian Roman in this television game show which continues to run as re-runs in the United States and around the world on Discovery networks.

Recorded with producer and writer Steve Messer, the song "This is America" features lyrics about American politics. It first became noticed when the Ben Carson presidential campaign heard the song and decided to use it as their campaign song for 2016. Quickly after Ben Carson used the song it had commercial success by reaching number one on the Billboard Twitter Emerging Artist chart on November 28th, 2015 where it continued to stay on the chart for weeks. The song was controversial in nature and garnered mixed reviews, digg.com said it was "one of the worste campaign songs of all time." Dan Fallon of digg.com wrote "Props to Tranchita for almost getting the lyric "While governmental power tends to grow continuously" to not sound super awkward." Tranchita told The Guardian, "When I started to look into Ben Carson and what he stood for...people who have a faith – I identify with them because it does separate from people who do not.” Ben Carson personally thanked Justin for allowing him to use the song publicly in a statement to his Facebook followers, This is America returned to the number one spot again in 2016 after spending ten weeks on Billboards Emerging chart. This gave Tranchita a number one hit with the same song in two different years.

== Discography ==
- The Devil Song, (single) (2012)
- Cock of The Walk (2012)
- This is America (single) (2015)
- American Man 2016

== Michigan State House Run ==
After the song "This is America" vaulted Tranchita into the political limelight he decided to run for the Michigan State House, district 32 in March of 2016. He was among Macomb County Republicans competing in state House races. Tranchita said the popularity of his song was responsible in part for his run, he told The Detroit News, "Millions of people have responded to [the song]... There's some angst, some anger, and people are feeling like their voices aren't heard. I feel that. I'm a blue-collar guy, not some elitist or crony that wants to be in the ruling class." After a very hard fought race Tranchita was narrowly defeated in his first ever political campaign by six percent in the August 2016 primary.
