= Village Hall (Sheffield, Illinois) =

- U.S. National Register of Historic Places
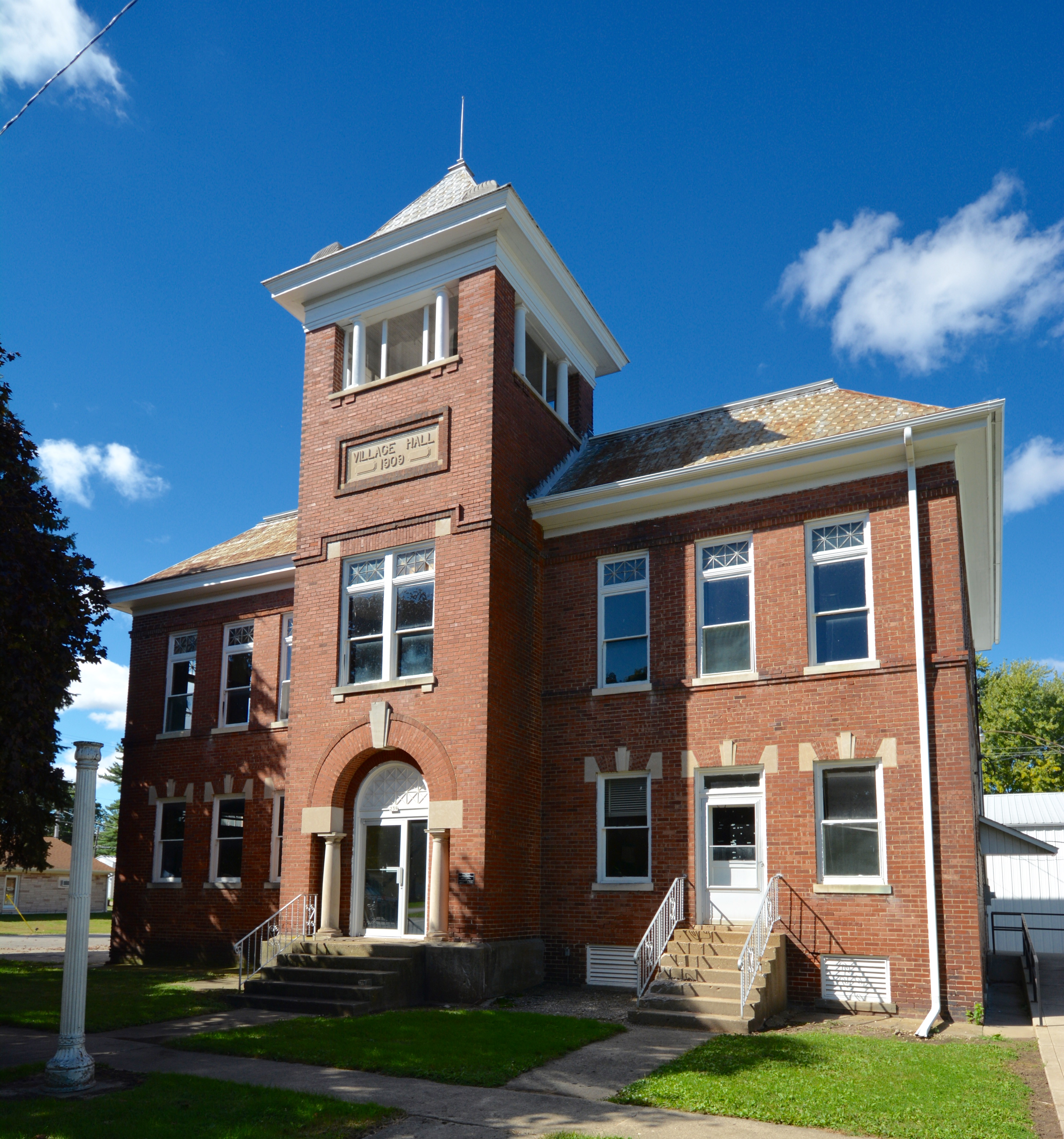

- Location within Illinois Location within the United States
- Location: 239 S. Main St., Sheffield, Illinois
- Coordinates: 41°21′24″N 89°44′15″W
- Built: 1910
- Built by: Patrick M. Ford
- Architect: George Franklin Barber
- Architectural style: Classical Revival, Romanesque Revival
- NRHP reference No.: 12001112
- Added to NRHP: January 2, 2013

The Village Hall is a historic government building located at 239 South Main Street in Sheffield, Illinois. The building was constructed in 1910 to replace the village's original village hall, which was built in 1887 but had become too small for the village. Architect George Franklin Barber designed the building; while Barber was nationally known for his mail-order residential designs, the Village Hall was one of his only municipal works. Barber's design used Neoclassical elements extensively, including limestone columns flanking the entrance, a cornice and entablature along the roof line, jack arches on the first-story windows, and Roman grilles above the entrance and second-story windows. The building also features a Romanesque arch surrounding the main entrance and Victorian massing in its central bell tower.

The building was added to the National Register of Historic Places on January 2, 2013.
