= Wood–Tellkamp House =

Historic house in Illinois, United States

- U.S. National Register of Historic Places
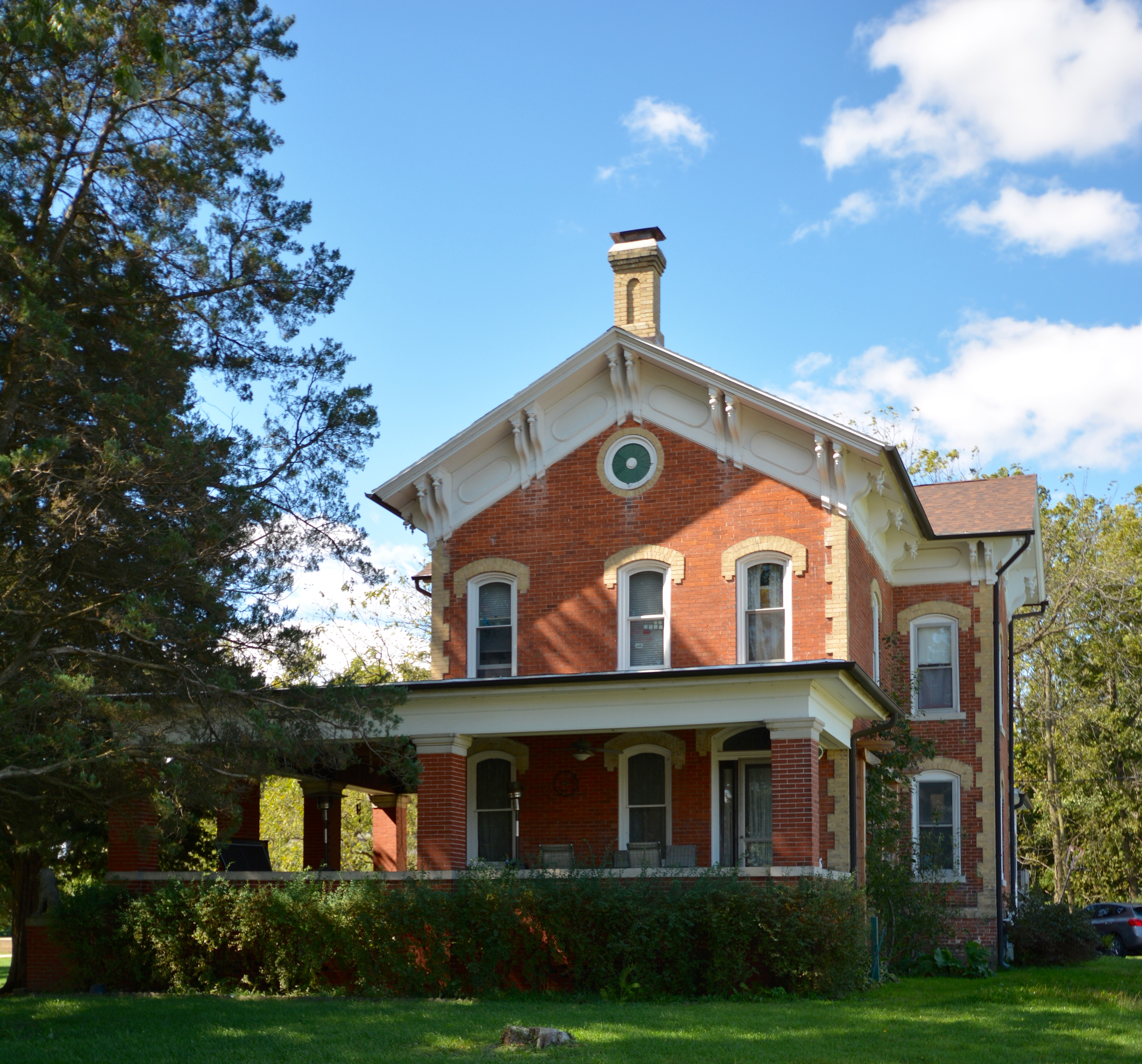

- Location within Illinois Location within the United States
- Location: 82 Main St., La Moille, Illinois
- Coordinates: 41°32′0″N 89°16′49″W
- Area: 2 acres (0.81 ha)
- Built: 1872
- Architectural style: Italianate, Classical Revival
- NRHP reference No.: 94001599
- Added to NRHP: January 24, 1995

The Wood–Tellkamp House is a historic house located at 82 Main Street in La Moille, Illinois, United States. Charles C. Wood, a local farmer, built the house circa 1872 upon his retirement. The house's Italianate design was the most elaborate in the village at the time of its completion. The design featured a red brick exterior with quoins in yellow brick, tall arched windows with yellow brick hoods, paired brackets under the eaves, and two marble fireplaces. Between 1914 and 1917, owners Henry and Louise Tellkamp added a Neoclassical porch with square columns to the east and south sides of the house.

The house was added to the National Register of Historic Places on January 24, 1995.
