= Mineral Township, Bureau County, Illinois =

Mineral Township
- Township
- Location in Bureau County

- Bureau County's location in Illinois
- Coordinates: 41°21′44″N 89°48′06″W
- Country: United States
- State: Illinois
- County: Bureau
- Established: November 6, 1849

Area
  - Total: 36.1 sq mi (93 km^{2})
  - Land: 35.96 sq mi (93.1 km^{2})
  - Water: 0.14 sq mi (0.36 km^{2}) 0.39%
- Elevation: 663 ft (202 m)

Population (2020)
  - Total: 477
  - Density: 13.3/sq mi (5.12/km^{2})
- Time zone: UTC-6 (CST)
  - Summer (DST): UTC-5 (CDT)
- ZIP codes: 61314, 61344, 61345, 61361
- FIPS code: 17-011-49529

Mineral Township is one of twenty-five townships in Bureau County, Illinois, USA. As of the 2020 census, its population was 477 and it contained 241 housing units.

The township was named for its nearby coal deposits.

== Geography ==
According to the 2010 census, the township has a total area of 36.1 square miles (93 km^{2}), of which 35.96 square miles (93.1 km^{2}) (or 99.61%) is land and 0.14 square miles (0.36 km^{2}) (or 0.39%) is water.

=== Cities ===
- Mineral
- Sheffield (west quarter)

=== Cemeteries ===
The township contains Mineral Cemetery.

=== Major highways ===
- Interstate 80
- US Route 6
- US Route 34

=== Airports and landing strips ===
- Edwin G Bennett Airport

=== Landmarks ===
- Hennepin Canal Parkway State Park (south quarter)

== Demographics ==
As of the 2020 census there were 477 people, 207 households, and 144 families residing in the township. The population density was 13.20 inhabitants per square mile (5.10/km^{2}). There were 232 housing units at an average density of 6.42 per square mile (2.48/km^{2}). The racial makeup of the township was 94.34% White, 1.47% African American, 0.21% Native American, 0.00% Asian, 0.00% Pacific Islander, 0.21% from other races, and 3.77% from two or more races. Hispanic or Latino of any race were 0.84% of the population.

There were 207 households, out of which 33.80% had children under the age of 18 living with them, 56.52% were married couples living together, 7.25% had a female householder with no spouse present, and 30.43% were non-families. 26.10% of all households were made up of individuals, and 13.50% had someone living alone who was 65 years of age or older. The average household size was 2.42 and the average family size was 2.89.

The township's age distribution consisted of 21.2% under the age of 18, 10.0% from 18 to 24, 23.2% from 25 to 44, 30.4% from 45 to 64, and 15.4% who were 65 years of age or older. The median age was 41.0 years. For every 100 females, there were 115.0 males. For every 100 females age 18 and over, there were 104.7 males.

The median income for a household in the township was $46,319, and the median income for a family was $57,500. Males had a median income of $38,472 versus $18,438 for females. The per capita income for the township was $23,194. About 7.6% of families and 7.7% of the population were below the poverty line, including 18.0% of those under age 18 and 2.6% of those age 65 or over.

Historical population
Census	Pop.	Note	%±
2010	484		—
2020	477		−1.4%
US Decennial Census

== School districts ==
- Annawan Community Unit School District 226
- Bureau Valley Community Unit School District 340
- Neponset Community Consolidated District 307

== Political districts ==
- Illinois's 11th congressional district
- State House District 74
- State Senate District 37
