= Hampshire Colony Congregational Church =

Historic church in Illinois, United States

- U.S. National Register of Historic Places
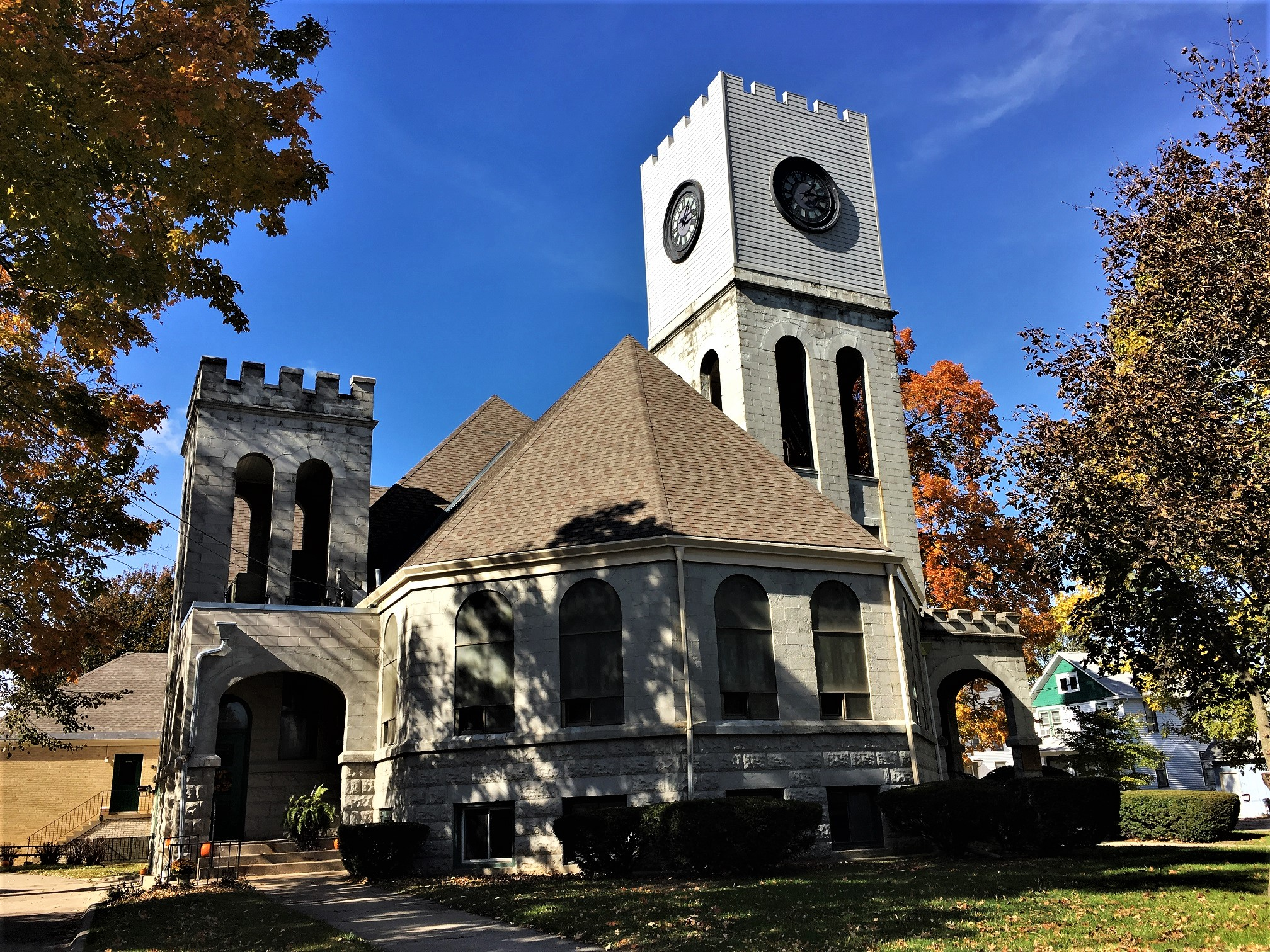

- Location within Illinois Location within the United States
- Location: 604 S. Church St., Princeton, Illinois
- Coordinates: 41°22′9.1″N 89°27′46.3″W
- Built: 1905-06
- NRHP reference No.: 100002821
- Added to NRHP: August 28, 2018

The Hampshire Colony Congregational Church of Princeton, Illinois was founded in 1831 and was the first Congregational church in Illinois. Its Richardsonian Romanesque church building, which was built in 1905-06, is listed on the National Register of Historic Places.

== History ==
In 1831 young people in the New England area were encouraged to take advantage of the fertile land in Illinois, being sold cheaply. On February 9, 1831, The New Hampshire Gazette printed a notice from the Illinois Colonial Association that a meeting would be held in a local coffee house in Northampton, Massachusetts on Wednesday, the 16 February 1831 at 10:00 A. M.

The purpose of this meeting was to organize a Church fellowship before going out west. This idea was growing in the area and flyers were sent out stating:

“It was not so much to promote the private interests of its members as to advance the cause of Christ by planting religious institutions in the virgin soil of the west and aiding the cause of Christian education in its various departments.”

When more than a few people offered themselves to this effort, a council was convened. This is how Hampshire Colony Congregational Church was founded on March 23, 1831. Ebeneezer Strong Phelps, a deacon at Northampton Church, was one of the charter members and the council meeting was held in his home.

The 18 charter members of the church came not only from the Northampton church but from surrounding churches as well. They came from Elizabethtown, Conway, Amherst, Warwick, Springfield, South Haley, and even Chutney, Vermont. The purpose of this church start was clear. In fact, at the service held to organize the church, even the council was made up of pastors and laymen from three of the churches. It is fitting then, to name the church Hampshire Colony, after the county where it was founded.

The council was held. After they went to the church to worship. Rev. Diabolic Spencer preached a sermon and quoted Luke 12:32, “Fear not little flock, it is your Father’s good pleasure to give you the Kingdom.” After the sermon they took communion with the large congregation that had gathered to see them off, and a collection of $54.00 was given to supply the infant church with new vessels for the communion table. The church is now a member of the National Association of Congregational Christian Churches. It was listed on the National Register of Historic Places in 2018.
