= Sheffield, Illinois =

Sheffield
- Village
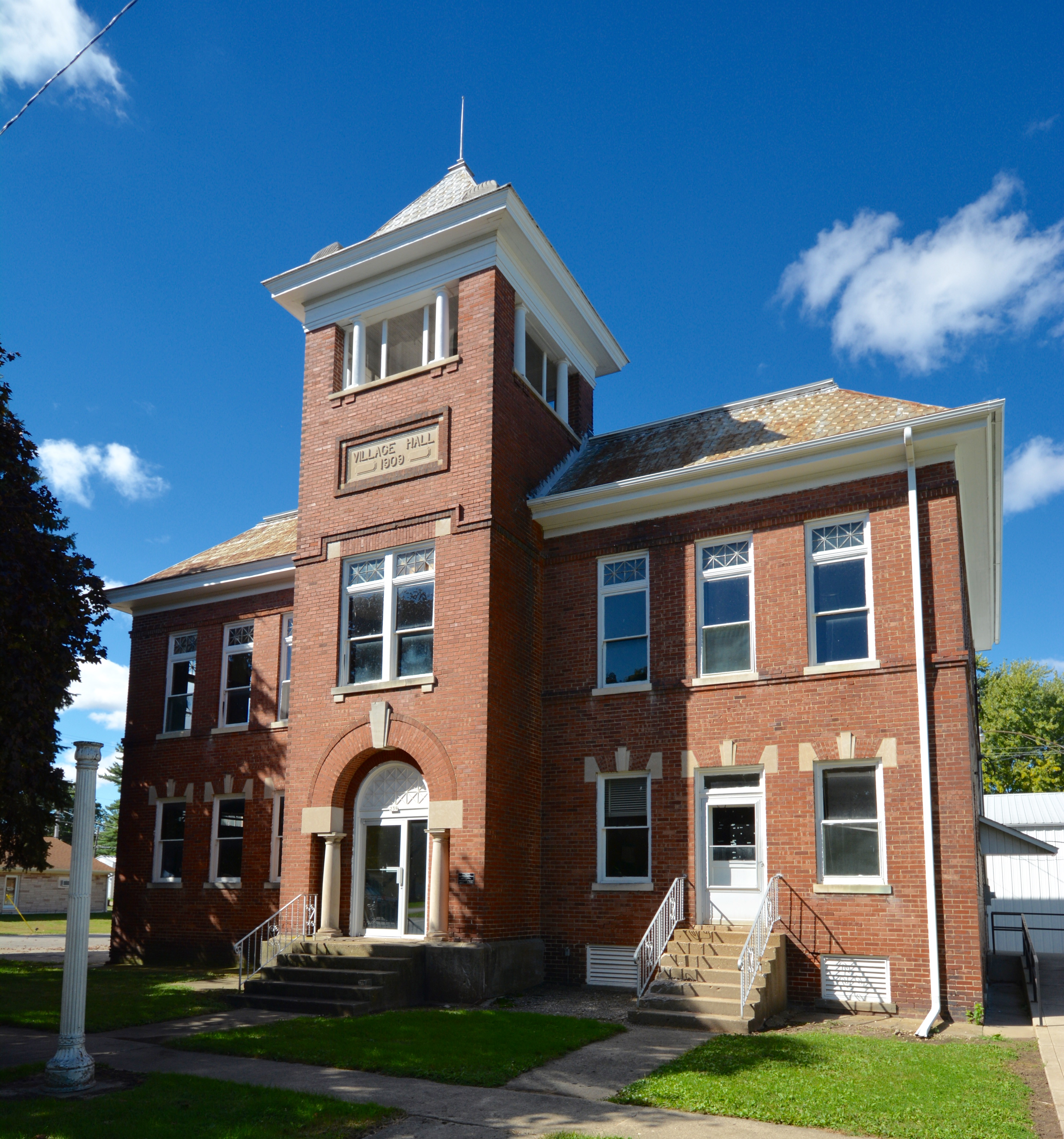
- Village Hall at 239 South Main Street

- Location of Sheffield in Bureau County, Illinois.
- Coordinates: 41°21′30″N 89°44′50″W
- Country: United States
- State: Illinois
- County: Bureau
- Townships: Concord, Mineral

Area
  - Total: 1.169 sq mi (3.03 km^{2})
  - Land: 1.169 sq mi (3.03 km^{2})
  - Water: 0.00 sq mi (0 km^{2})
- Elevation: 679 ft (207 m)

Population (2020)
  - Total: 821
  - Density: 702/sq mi (271/km^{2})
- Time zone: UTC-6 (CST)
  - Summer (DST): UTC-5 (CDT)
- ZIP code: 61361
- Area code: 815
- FIPS code: 17-69147
- GNIS feature ID: 2399794
- Website: sheffieldil.org

Sheffield is a village in Bureau County, Illinois, United States. The population was 821 at the 2020 census. It is part of the Ottawa Micropolitan Statistical Area. Sheffield was founded by Joseph E. Sheffield and Henry Farnam in 1852. Sheffield and Farnam constructed the Chicago and Rock Island Railroad, and the town site was intended as a coaling station for trains. According to Farnam, he and Sheffield flipped a coin to see for whom the town would be named. A monument to Joseph E. Sheffield, and the Rock Island Railroad stands today in Sheffield's town square.

== Geography ==
According to the 2021 census gazetteer files, Sheffield has a total area of 1.17 square miles (3.03 km^{2}), all land.

== Demographics ==
Historical population
Census	Pop.	Note	%±
1860	706		—
1870	771		9.2%
1880	905		17.4%
1890	993		9.7%
1900	1,265		27.4%
1910	1,009		−20.2%
1920	996		−1.3%
1930	941		−5.5%
1940	948		0.7%
1950	995		5.0%
1960	1,078		8.3%
1970	1,038		−3.7%
1980	1,130		8.9%
1990	951		−15.8%
2000	946		−0.5%
2010	926		−2.1%
2020	821		−11.3%
U.S. Decennial Census

As of the 2020 census there were 821 people, 369 households, and 218 families residing in the village. The population density was 702.31 inhabitants per square mile (271.16/km^{2}). There were 411 housing units at an average density of 351.58 per square mile (135.75/km^{2}). The racial makeup of the village was 95.25% White, 0.24% African American, 0.61% from other races, and 3.90% from two or more races. Hispanic or Latino of any race were 2.56% of the population.

There were 369 households, out of which 24.4% had children under the age of 18 living with them, 50.95% were married couples living together, 7.59% had a female householder with no husband present, and 40.92% were non-families. 27.37% of all households were made up of individuals, and 11.65% had someone living alone who was 65 years of age or older. The average household size was 2.66 and the average family size was 2.24.

The village's age distribution consisted of 19.3% under the age of 18, 7.2% from 18 to 24, 24.3% from 25 to 44, 28.1% from 45 to 64, and 21.1% who were 65 years of age or older. The median age was 44.5 years. For every 100 females, there were 89.0 males. For every 100 females age 18 and over, there were 101.2 males.

The median income for a household in the village was $48,854, and the median income for a family was $67,250. Males had a median income of $41,875 versus $26,429 for females. The per capita income for the village was $27,810. About 9.6% of families and 13.4% of the population were below the poverty line, including 10.5% of those under age 18 and 10.3% of those age 65 or over.

== Education ==
It is in the Bureau Valley Community Unit School District 340.

== Notable persons ==
- Red Gunkel, pitcher for the Cleveland Indians
- Olive Percival, (1868–1945), gardening writer
- Clayton C. Pervier (1857–1929), Illinois politician, farmer, and newspaper editor
- Jason Ringenberg, musician
