= Princeton, Illinois =

- City
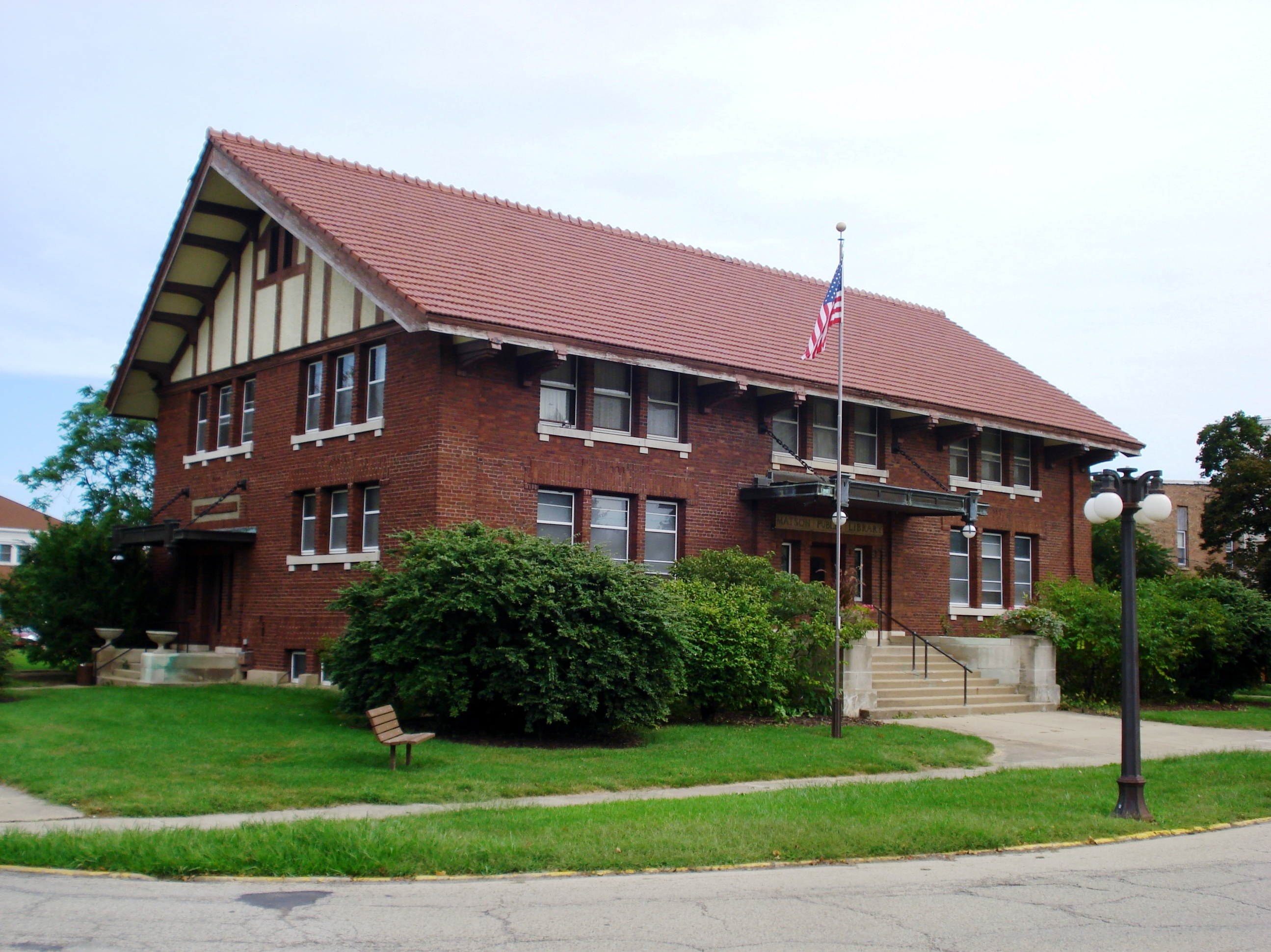
- Matson Library
- Interactive map of Princeton, Illinois
- Location within Illinois Location within the United States
- Coordinates: 41°22′23″N 89°27′53″W
- Country: United States
- State: Illinois
- County: Bureau
- Townships: Princeton, Dover
- Settled: 1830s
- Incorporated, City: 1884

Government
  - Type: Council-Manager

Area
  - Total: 8.24 sq mi (21.34 km^{2})
  - Land: 8.24 sq mi (21.34 km^{2})
  - Water: 0 sq mi (0.00 km^{2})
- Elevation: 682 ft (208 m)

Population (2020)
  - Total: 7,832
  - Density: 950/sq mi (367/km^{2})
- Time zone: UTC-6 (CST)
  - Summer (DST): UTC-5 (CDT)
- Zip codes: 61356
- Area code: 815
- FIPS code: 17-61899
- GNIS feature ID: 2396278
- Website: www.princeton-il.com

Princeton is a city in and the county seat of Bureau County, Illinois, United States. The population was 7,832 at the 2020 census.

Princeton is part of the Ottawa Micropolitan Statistical Area.

== History ==
Bureau County was a New England settlement. The founders of Princeton consisted entirely of settlers from New England. These people were "Yankees," descended from the English Puritans who settled New England in the 1600s. They were part of a wave of New England farmers who headed west into what was then the wilds of the Northwest Territory during the early 1800s. Most of them arrived as a result of the completion of the Erie Canal. When they arrived in what is now Bureau County there was nothing but a virgin forest and wild prairie; the New Englanders laid out farms, constructed roads, erected government buildings and established post routes. They brought with them many of their Yankee New England values, such as a passion for education, fueling the establishment of many schools, as well as staunch support for abolitionism. They were mostly members of the Congregationalist Church, though some were Episcopalian.

Culturally, Bureau County, like much of northern Illinois, would be culturally very continuous with early New England culture for most of its history. During the time of slavery, it was a stop on the Underground Railroad at the home of Owen Lovejoy.

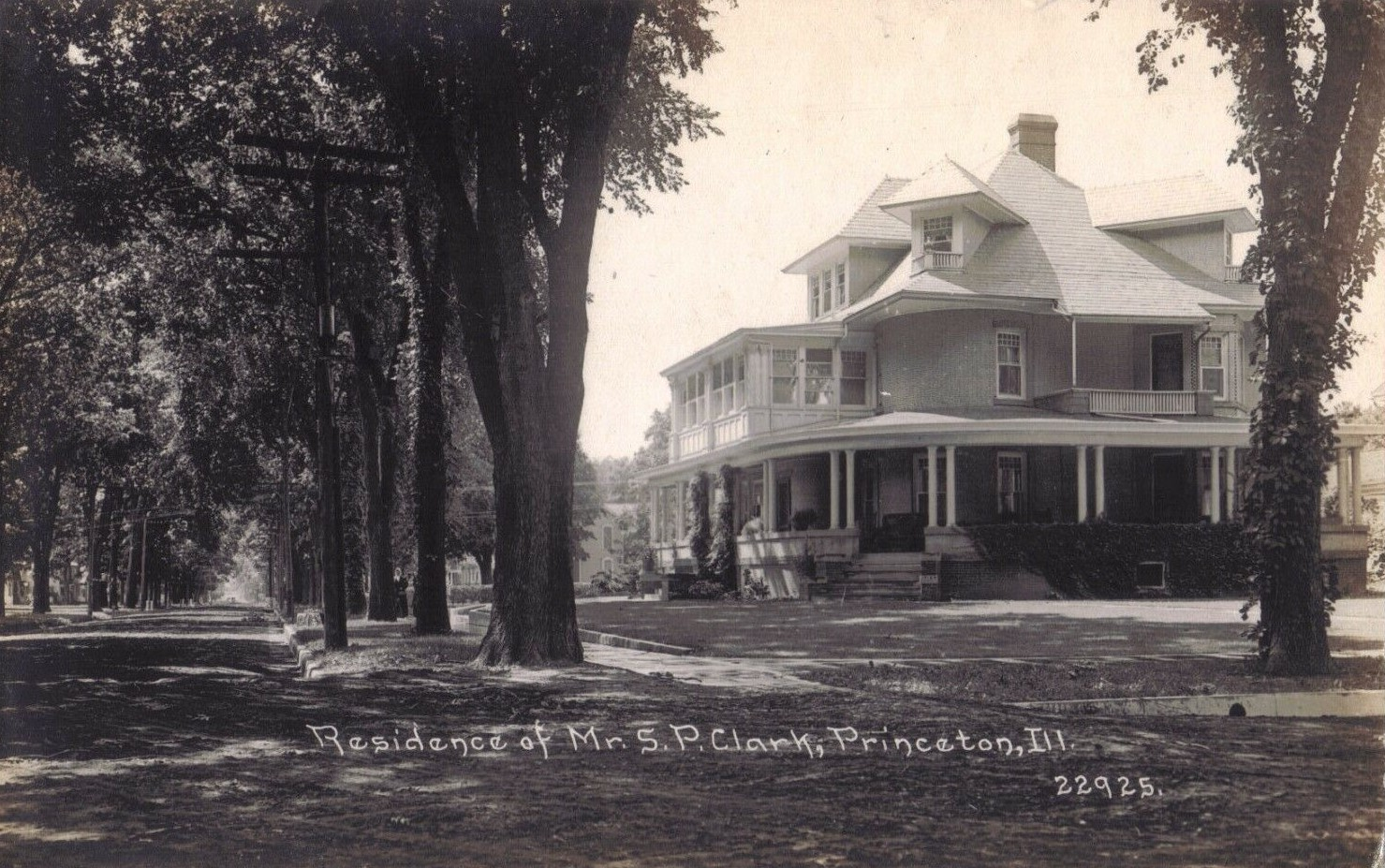
The house of Samuel P. Clark at 109 West Park Ave., Princeton, IL was shown on a postcard c. 1915 and today is the county historical museum.

The name of Princeton was supposedly determined by drawing from a hat:

"The naming of the township of Princeton was the privilege of the three trustees, Roland Moseley, John Musgrove and John P. Blake...each one had a favorite name to present.. but could come to no agreement; finally it was decided that it should be settled by lottery. Each man was to write the name of his choice upon a piece of paper and place it in a hat, and a stranger, being blind-folded, should make the drawing. Mr. Musgrove, coming from New Jersey, and being loyal to his classic institution, wrote upon his slip Princeton, and as it had been agreed that the first name drawn should settle the question..(on) the slip of paper drawn by the blind-folded man, Princeton was plainly written, and so we today have the classic name of Princeton for the legal center of Bureau county. Princeton, for many years has enjoyed the distinction of being one of the literary centers of the state. She has the proud record of organizing and putting in successful operation the first township high school in Illinois. It is surely a city of quiet and pleasant homes."

— George B. Harrington, Past and Present of Bureau County, 1906

Princeton's former nickname was "The City of Elms" because of the large number of elm trees the city had during the middle of the 20th century. After Dutch elm disease struck in the mid-1960's and killed off almost every elm, Princeton's slogan was changed to "Where Tradition Meets Progress".

Now, the slogan is "A Short Drive that Takes you Far."

== Geography ==
According to the 2021 census gazetteer files, Princeton has a total area of 8.24 square miles (21.34 km^{2}), all land.

=== Climate ===
Climate data for Princeton, Illinois (1991–2020 normals, extremes 1987–present)
Month	Jan	Feb	Mar	Apr	May	Jun	Jul	Aug	Sep	Oct	Nov	Dec	Year
Record high °F (°C)	68 (20)	70 (21)	84 (29)	93 (34)	97 (36)	102 (39)	103 (39)	102 (39)	98 (37)	89 (32)	79 (26)	70 (21)	103 (39)
Mean daily maximum °F (°C)	30.3 (−0.9)	35.0 (1.7)	47.9 (8.8)	61.5 (16.4)	72.6 (22.6)	81.7 (27.6)	84.5 (29.2)	82.3 (27.9)	76.1 (24.5)	63.0 (17.2)	47.9 (8.8)	35.4 (1.9)	59.8 (15.4)
Daily mean °F (°C)	22.1 (−5.5)	26.3 (−3.2)	37.8 (3.2)	49.8 (9.9)	61.2 (16.2)	70.6 (21.4)	73.9 (23.3)	71.7 (22.1)	64.5 (18.1)	52.2 (11.2)	38.8 (3.8)	27.5 (−2.5)	49.7 (9.8)
Mean daily minimum °F (°C)	13.8 (−10.1)	17.6 (−8.0)	27.6 (−2.4)	38.1 (3.4)	49.8 (9.9)	59.5 (15.3)	63.2 (17.3)	61.1 (16.2)	53.0 (11.7)	41.5 (5.3)	29.7 (−1.3)	19.6 (−6.9)	39.5 (4.2)
Record low °F (°C)	−26 (−32)	−30 (−34)	−9 (−23)	16 (−9)	28 (−2)	40 (4)	48 (9)	46 (8)	30 (−1)	19 (−7)	3 (−16)	−18 (−28)	−30 (−34)
Average precipitation inches (mm)	1.96 (50)	2.00 (51)	2.52 (64)	4.03 (102)	5.07 (129)	4.64 (118)	3.66 (93)	4.02 (102)	3.90 (99)	3.14 (80)	2.61 (66)	2.24 (57)	39.79 (1,011)
Average snowfall inches (cm)	8.6 (22)	6.9 (18)	3.7 (9.4)	0.9 (2.3)	0.0 (0.0)	0.0 (0.0)	0.0 (0.0)	0.0 (0.0)	0.0 (0.0)	0.3 (0.76)	1.3 (3.3)	6.8 (17)	28.5 (72)
Average precipitation days (≥ 0.01 in)	7.9	7.5	8.2	10.4	11.3	9.7	7.7	8.1	7.5	8.8	8.2	8.0	103.3
Average snowy days (≥ 0.1 in)	5.1	4.2	1.9	0.5	0.0	0.0	0.0	0.0	0.0	0.2	1.0	4.0	16.9
Source: NOAA

== Demographics ==
Historical population
Census	Pop.	Note	%±
1860	2,473		—
1870	3,264		32.0%
1880	3,439		5.4%
1890	3,396		−1.3%
1900	4,023		18.5%
1910	4,131		2.7%
1920	4,126		−0.1%
1930	4,762		15.4%
1940	5,224		9.7%
1950	5,765		10.4%
1960	6,250		8.4%
1970	6,959		11.3%
1980	7,342		5.5%
1990	7,197		−2.0%
2000	7,501		4.2%
2010	7,660		2.1%
2020	7,832		2.2%
U.S. Decennial Census

=== 2020 census ===
As of the 2020 census, Princeton had a population of 7,832. There were 3,533 households and 2,047 families residing in the city. The population density was 950.49 inhabitants per square mile (366.99/km^{2}), and there were 3,832 housing units at an average density of 465.05 per square mile (179.56/km^{2}). The median age was 47.1 years. 19.4% of residents were under the age of 18, and 26.3% of residents were 65 years of age or older. For every 100 females, there were 90.8 males, and for every 100 females age 18 and over, there were 85.9 males age 18 and over.

98.5% of residents lived in urban areas, while 1.5% lived in rural areas.

Of all households, 23.4% had children under the age of 18 living in them. Of all households, 41.4% were married-couple households, 18.8% were households with a male householder and no spouse or partner present, and 32.6% were households with a female householder and no spouse or partner present. About 38.6% of all households were made up of individuals, and 19.4% had someone living alone who was 65 years of age or older.

Of the city's housing units, 7.8% were vacant. The homeowner vacancy rate was 2.5%, and the rental vacancy rate was 7.1%.

Racial composition as of the 2020 census
Race	Number	Percent
White	7,174	91.6%
Black or African American	88	1.1%
American Indian and Alaska Native	29	0.4%
Asian	101	1.3%
Native Hawaiian and Other Pacific Islander	11	0.1%
Some other race	87	1.1%
Two or more races	342	4.4%
Hispanic or Latino (of any race)	372	4.7%

=== Income and poverty ===
The median income for a household in the city was $51,844, and the median income for a family was $66,473. Males had a median income of $41,096 versus $23,266 for females. The per capita income for the city was $31,187. About 8.5% of families and 13.7% of the population were below the poverty line, including 24.9% of those under age 18 and 5.1% of those age 65 or over.

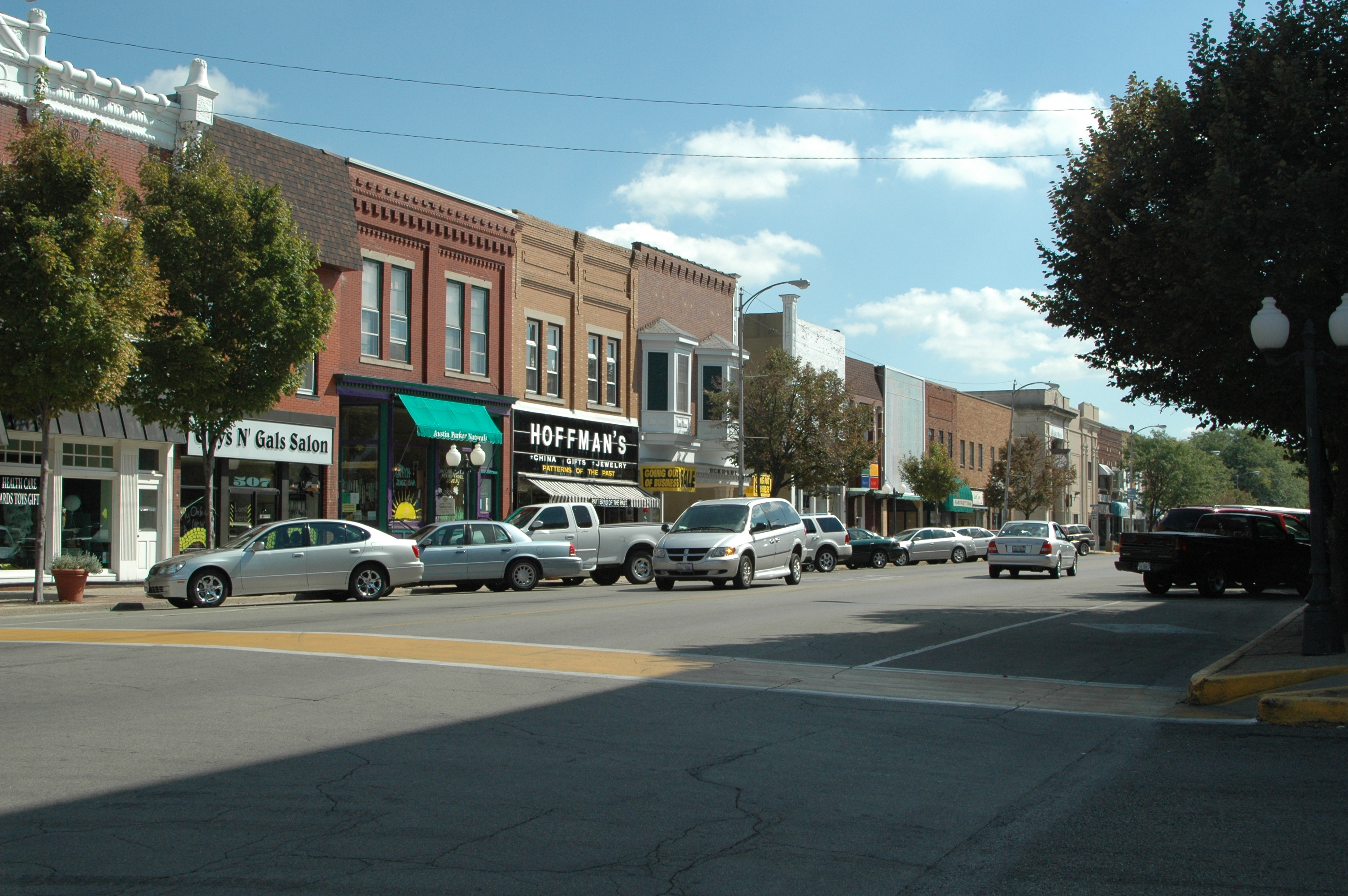
South historic Main Street district in Princeton, Illinois.

== Economy ==
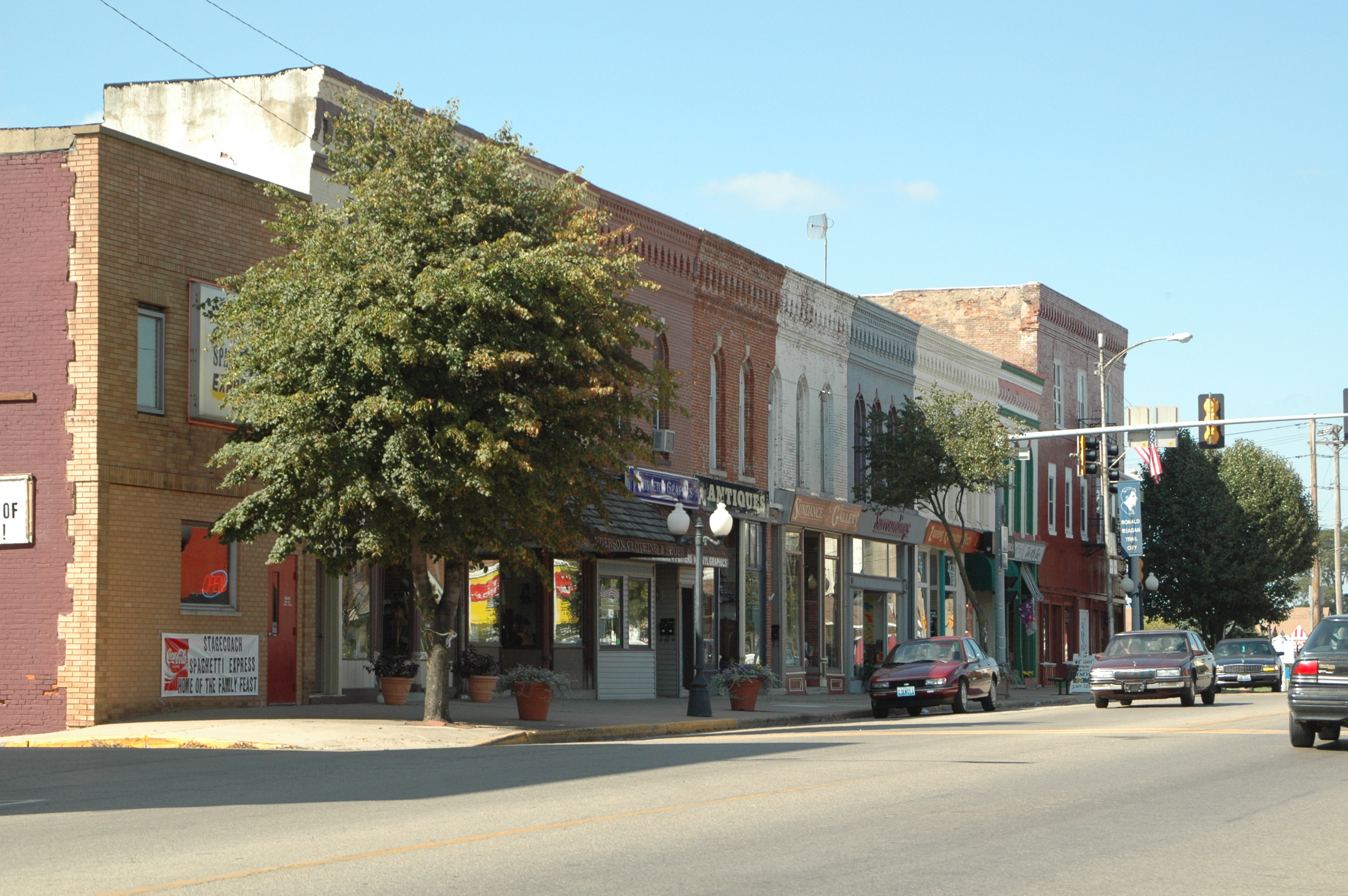
View of north historic Main Street district in Princeton, Illinois

Princeton's major employers include L.W. Schneider, Inc., Ace Hardware Retail Support Center, LCN Closers (a division of Allegion), MTM Recognition, formerly Josten's, makers of several world championship rings, including the 2005 Chicago White Sox, all of the Chicago Bulls Championships, and the 1985 Chicago Bears. Champion Pneumatic manufactures air compressors, Pioneer Hi-Bred International and Perry Memorial Hospital.

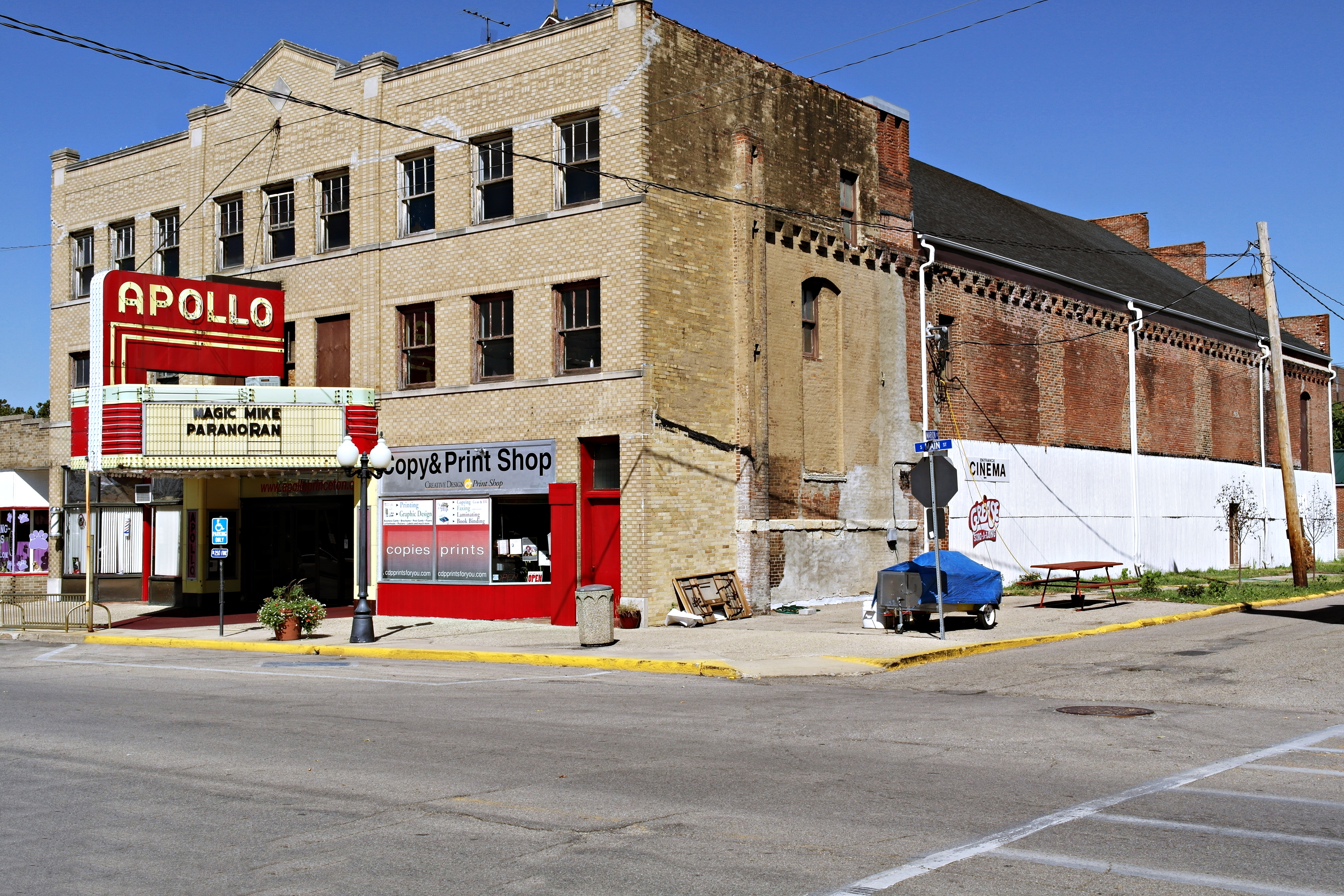
The Apollo Theatre

Princeton's Main Street is lined with independent shops and restaurants. The south end, or downtown, is the historic retail center of town and still contains the city's only movie theater (The Apollo), the courthouse, the Bureau County Historical Society, the historic Matson library building, main bank offices, as well as more service-oriented businesses. The north end, also referred to as The Art District, is located about a mile uptown, north, and contains its own business district, park, and the city's historic Amtrak depot. In the past several years, this area has transformed with the addition of upscale clothing stores and the restoration of a historic hotel building.

=== Major event ===
Each year, the city of Princeton holds its annual Homestead Festival the second weekend in September. There are usually over one hundred entries in the parade. The homestead festival hosts a variety of events, including the famous pork chop barbecue, a beer garden with local bands, children's events, a craft show, and tasting booths. The festival, which began in 1971 as a celebration of the restoration of the Owen Lovejoy Homestead, now comprises a weekend of food, celebration, and the famous Homestead Parade.

=== Transportation ===
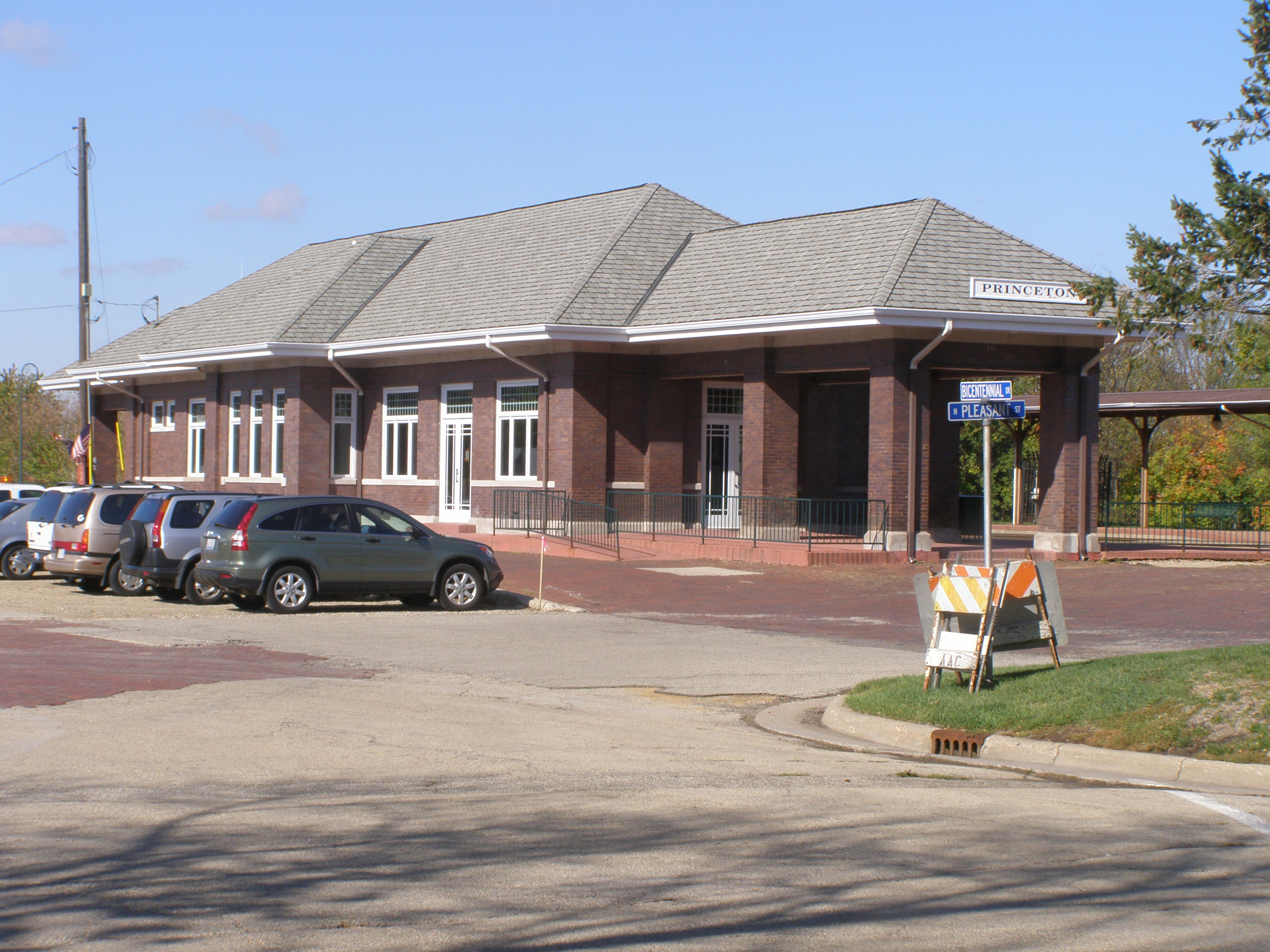
Amtrak station

Princeton is located on the south side of I-80, some 100 miles (160 km) southwest of Chicago. US 6, US 34, and IL 26 all run through Princeton.

Amtrak, the national passenger rail system, provides service to Princeton, operating the California Zephyr, the Illinois Zephyr, the Carl Sandburg and the Southwest Chief each daily in both directions between Chicago and points west from Princeton.

== Education ==
Princeton is home to Princeton High School, the oldest township high school in the state, founded in 1867. Its mascot is the Tiger. The high school enrollment fluctuates between 550 and 650 students. The school recently finished adding an addition to meet the students' needs. The new addition houses a larger library as well as several new classrooms. The school is home to the Frank and Marion Rathje track, which hosts high school soccer, football, and track and field teams from around the region.

== Library ==
Princeton's library history dates back to March 1886, when a location for the library was decided upon and secured. The first library was located in the building that is now 529 South Main Street. In 1890, the Matson Public Library, located on South Main, was first opened for use by the public. It remained in use for 22 years. In 1912, the construction of a larger Matson Public Library building was begun. It was located at 15 Park Avenue East. On March 21, 2006, a referendum was passed for the renovation of 698 East Peru Street, formerly known as Bogo's, to become Princeton Public Library. Princeton Public Library opened on August 1, 2007, replacing an older facility, the Matson Public Library, and has a book collection of 45,000 items, with about 27,000 square feet (2,500 m^{2}) of usable space. The library is located on East Peru Street (U.S. Route 6). In March 2009, the Princeton Public Library was one of only three libraries in the state of Illinois to host Between Fences, an exhibit sponsored by the Smithsonian Institution Traveling Exhibits Service (SITES) and the Illinois Humanities Council. Additional exhibits include Bookstock: Celebrating 40 Years of Woodstock, and Cherry Mine Disaster Revisited, a showcase commemorating the lives lost during the Cherry Mine Disaster of 1909.

== Notable people ==
- William Bascom, folklorist, anthropologist
- John Howard Bryant, Poet William Cullen Bryant's Brother, an original Bureau County settler, and friend of Abraham Lincoln
- E. Leslie Conkling, educator and Illinois state legislator
- James E. Dabler, Illinois state representative and businessman
- Henry C. Doolittle, state assemblyman from Wisconsin
- William Dyke, Wisconsin judge and politician
- Aleta Fenceroy, LGBT activist, musician, divorced mother of 2 children
- Virgil Fox, one of the greatest organists of the 20th Century
- Billy Garrett, auto racer
- Gary Green, guitarist for the band Gentle Giant
- Thomas P. Gunning, dentist and Illinois state senator
- Madison Gonterman, head football coach at Indiana University 1896–97
- Kathryn Hays, television actress, was on As the World Turns
- Frank Fernando Jones, Iowa state legislator
- Keith Knudsen, drummer with the Doobie Brothers graduated from Princeton High School
- Owen Lovejoy, Congressman and a leader in the Underground Railroad to free enslaved people
- Rufus Lumry, outspoken abolitionist and leading Illinois organizer of the Wesleyan Methodist Church (United States)
- Asa Mercer, founder of the University of Washington
- Colin Mickow, distance runner
- Bruce Nickells, harness racing driver and trainer; grew up in Princeton
- Ben Parr, author of Captivology, former co-editor of Mashable and columnist for CNET
- Joseph R. Peterson lawyer and Illinois state legislator
- Robert Petkoff, noted Broadway and television actor, graduated from Princeton High School
- Joseph "Joe" Ruklick, NBA basketball player with Philadelphia
- Eliza Suggs, temperance activist
- Josh Taylor, actor in Days of Our Lives and The Hogan Family TV series
- Justin Tranchita, actor and artist
- William V. Thompson, bowler
- Richard Widmark, Oscar-nominated actor of 61 movies
- Milo Winter, children's book artist
- Nick Young, radio newscaster with CBS and WBBM

== Media ==
=== Radio stations ===
- WZIV 90.7 FM
- WZOE 98.1 FM
- WZOE 1490 AM
