= Black genocide in the United States =

Framework for analyzing racism against African Americans

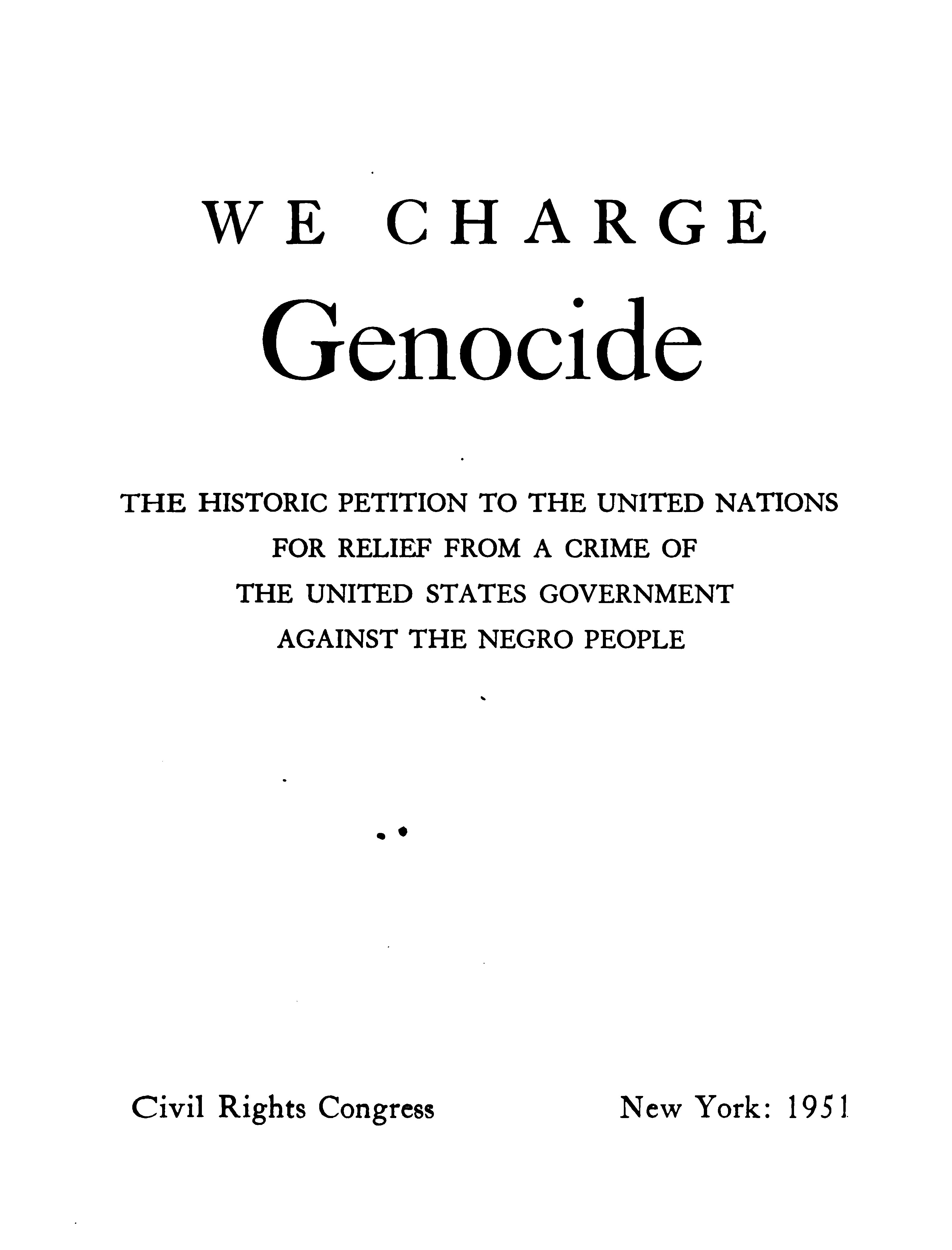
Title page of We Charge Genocide, as published by International Publishers in 1951

In the United States, black genocide is a historiographical framework and rhetorical term used to analyze the past and present impact of systemic racism on African Americans by both the United States government and white Americans. The decades of lynchings and long-term racial discrimination were first formally described as genocide by a now-defunct organization, the Civil Rights Congress, in a petition which it submitted to the United Nations in 1951. In the 1960s, Malcolm X accused the US government of engaging in human rights abuses, including genocide, against black people, citing long-term injustice, cruelty, and violence against blacks by whites.

The black genocide analogy has historically been applied to the war on drugs, war on crime, and War on Poverty for their detrimental effects on the black community. During the Vietnam War, the increasing use of black soldiers was criticized as an expression of black genocide. In recent decades, the disproportionately high black prison population has also been described as black genocide.

Some critics of the black genocide framework describe it as a conspiracy theory, while many of its proponents argue for its usefulness as a framework for analyzing systemic racism. Arguments against birth control, in particular, have been criticized as conspiratorial or exaggerated, although attempts at black population control and government-sponsored compulsory sterilization did occur into the 20th century.

== Slavery as genocide ==
Slavery in general and the Atlantic slave trade in particular was an archetypal example of a crime against humanity in the 19th century, a larger category of crimes that was expanded when genocide was included in it in the 20th century. George Washington Williams popularized the concept of crimes against humanity with regard to the history of slavery in the United States and during the Congo Free State propaganda war of the 1890s, the "laws of humanity" were included in the Martens Clause of the Hague Conventions and as a result, they were legally enshrined in international law.

Canadian scholar Adam Jones characterizes the mass death of millions of Africans during the Atlantic slave trade as a genocide, calling it "one of the worst holocausts in human history" due to the fact that it resulted in 15 to 20 million deaths according to one estimate, and he has also stated that arguments to the contrary, such as the argument that "it was in slave owners' interest to keep slaves alive, not exterminate them", is "mostly sophistry" since "the killing and destruction were intentional, whatever the incentives to preserve survivors of the Atlantic passage for labor exploitation. To revisit the issue of intent already touched on: If an institution is deliberately maintained and expanded by discernible agents, though all are aware of the hecatombs of casualties it is inflicting on a definable human group, then why should this not qualify as genocide?"

In his book, The Broken Heart of America, Harvard professor Walter Johnson wrote that on many occasions throughout the history of the enslavement of Africans in the US, many instances of genocide occurred, instances which included the separation of men from their wives, effectively reducing the size of the African-American population. For a black American who lived during the era of U.S. slavery, no rights were guaranteed, whether they were personally enslaved or not. In the United States a slave's life expectancy was 21 to 22 years, and a black child through the age of 1 to 14 had twice the risk of dying of a white child of the same age.

A 2021 paper published by the International Association of Genocide Scholars stated the slavery of African-Americans was genocide. As reasoning, the paper stated that Africans were stripped of their ethnic identities, murdered, tortured, raped, starved, removed from their parents, and prevented from forming families. The paper states these conditions satisfy Lemkin's conditions of genocide, and intent to harm on the part of slavers was well-documented.

== Jim Crow as genocide ==
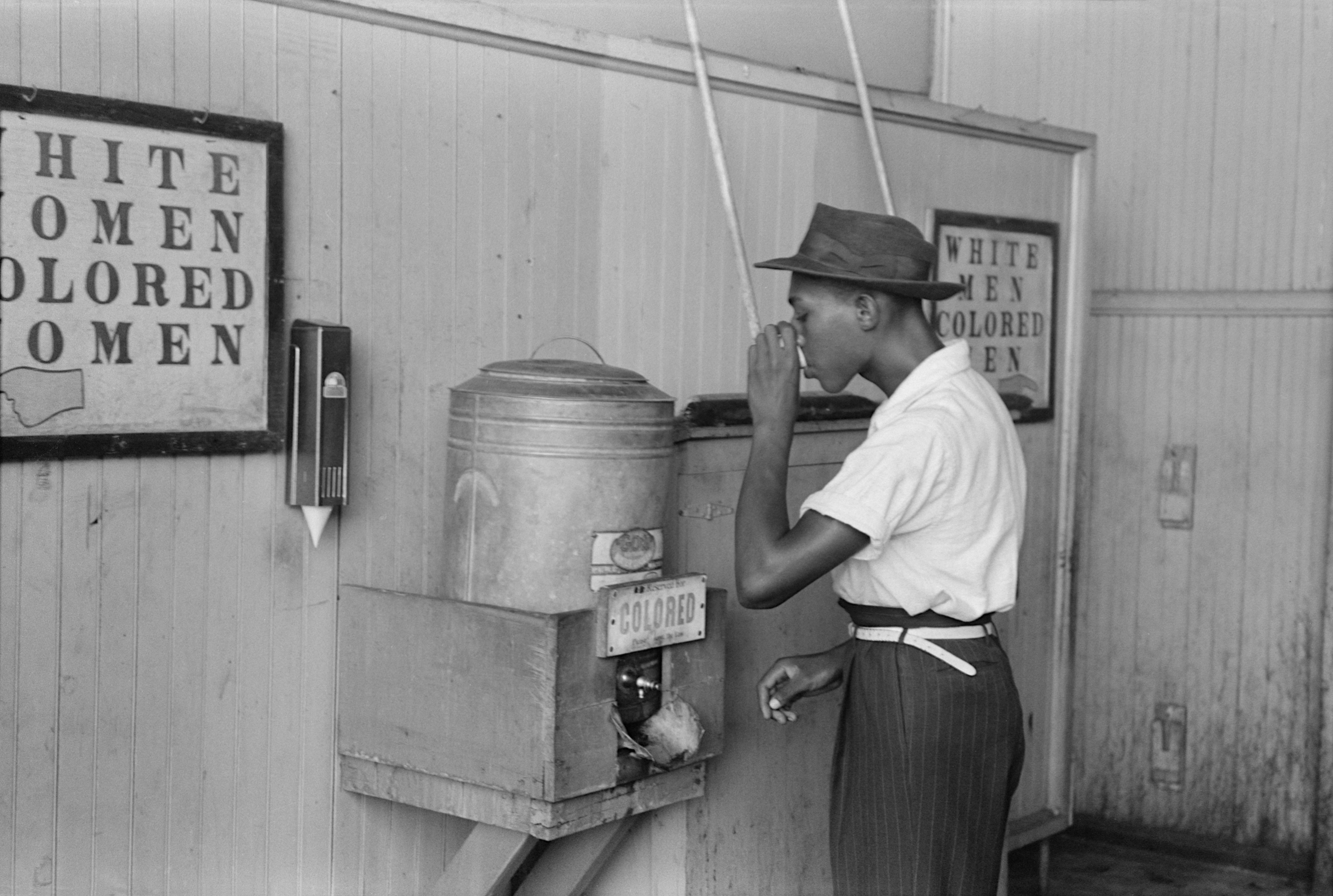
This image demonstrates segregation laws in practice in the Jim Crow era.

=== Petition to the United Nations ===
The United Nations (UN) was formed in 1945. The UN debated and adopted a Genocide Convention in late 1948, holding that genocide was the "intent to destroy, in whole or in part", a racial group. Based on the "in part" definition, the Civil Rights Congress (CRC), a group composed of African Americans with Communist affiliations, presented to the UN in 1951 a petition called "We Charge Genocide". The petition listed 10,000 unjust deaths of African Americans in the nine decades since the American Civil War. It described lynching, mistreatment, murder and oppression by whites against blacks, concluding that the US government was refusing to address "the persistent, widespread, institutionalized commission of the crime of genocide". The petition was presented to the UN convention in Paris by CRC leader William L. Patterson, and in New York City by the singer and actor Paul Robeson who was a civil rights activist and a Communist member of CRC.

The Cold War raised American concerns about Communist expansionism. The CRC petition was viewed by the US government as being against America's best interests with regard to fighting Communism. The petition was ignored by the UN; many of the charter countries looked to the US for guidance and were not willing to arm the enemies of the US with more propaganda about its failures in domestic racial policy. American responses to the petition were various: Radio journalist Drew Pearson spoke out against the supposed "Communist propaganda" before it was presented to the UN.

Professor Raphael Lemkin, a Polish lawyer who had helped draft the UN Genocide Convention, said that the CRC petition was a misguided effort which drew attention away from the Soviet Union's genocide of Estonians, Latvians and Lithuanians. The National Association for the Advancement of Colored People (NAACP) issued a statement saying that there was no black genocide even though serious matters of racial discrimination certainly did exist in America. Walter Francis White, leader of the NAACP, wrote that the CRC petition contained "authentic" instances of discrimination, mostly taken from reliable sources. He said, "Whatever the sins of the nation against the Negro—and they are many and gruesome—genocide is not among them." UN Delegate Eleanor Roosevelt said that it was "ridiculous" to characterize long term discrimination as genocide.

The "We Charge Genocide" petition received more notice in international news than in domestic US media. French and Czech media carried the story prominently, as did newspapers in India. In 1952, African-American author J. Saunders Redding traveling in India was repeatedly asked questions about specific instances of civil rights abuse in the US, and the CRC petition was used by Indians to rebut his assertions that US race relations were improving. In the US, the petition faded from public awareness by the late 1950s. In 1964, Malcolm X and his Organization of Afro-American Unity, citing the same lynchings and oppression described in the CRC petition, began to prepare their own petition to the UN asserting that the US government was engaging in genocide against black people. The 1964 Malcolm X speech "The Ballot or the Bullet" also draws from "We Charge Genocide".

After World War II and following many years of mistreatment of African Americans by white Americans, the US government's official policies regarding this mistreatment shifted significantly. The American Civil Liberties Union (ACLU) said in 1946 that negative international opinion about US racial policies helped to pressure the US into alleviating the mistreatment of ethnic minorities. In 1948, President Harry S. Truman signed an order desegregating the military, and black citizens increasingly challenged other forms of racial discrimination. In 1948, even if African Americans worked side by side with their white counterparts, they were often segregated into separate neighborhoods due to redlining.

=== Lynching and other racial killings ===
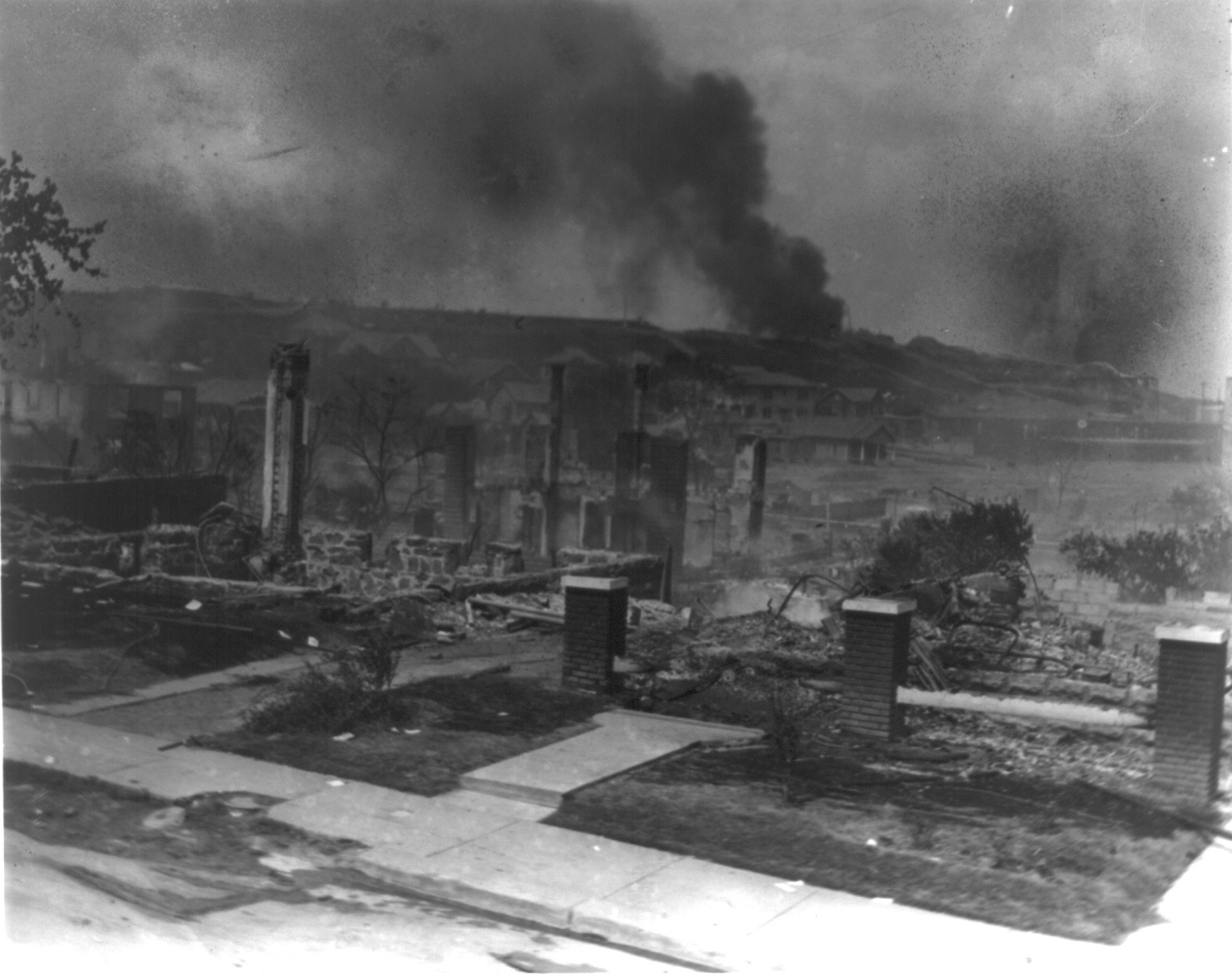
Smoldering ruins of African American homes following the Tulsa race massacre.

Walter Johnson has written that the first lynching to occur in the United States was that of Francis McIntosh, a free man of black and white ancestry. He argued that this lynching ignited a series of them, all with the goal of "ethnic cleansing" and that Abraham Lincoln, who was not yet president, was more concerned by the vigilantism of the lynching than the murder itself. Lincoln referred to McIntosh as "obnoxious" in his 1838 speech later dubbed the Lyceum Address. According to the National Memorial for Peace and Justice 4,400 black people killed in lynchings and other racial killings between 1877 and 1950.

Brandy Marie Langley argued, "The physical killing of black people in America, at this time period, was consistent with Lemkin's original idea of genocide." Famous literary and social activist figures such as Mark Twain and Ida B. Wells were compelled to speak out about lynchings. Twain's essay about lynchings titled "The United States of Lyncherdom", a remark on widespread occurrence of lynchings in the US. According to Christopher Waldrep, the media and racist whites, both inadvertently and not, exaggerated the presence of black crime as a method of appeasing their own guilt surrounding the lynchings of African Americans.

=== Sterilization ===
Beginning in 1907, some US state legislatures passed laws allowing for the compulsory sterilization of criminals, intellectually disabled people, and institutionalized mentally ill patients. At first, African Americans and white Americans suffered sterilization in roughly equal ratio. By 1945, some 70,000 Americans had been sterilized in these programs. In the 1950s, the federal welfare program Aid to Families with Dependent Children (AFDC) was criticized by some whites who did not want to subsidize poor black families. States such as North and South Carolina performed sterilization procedures on low-income black mothers who were giving birth to their second child. The mothers were told that they would have to agree to have their tubes tied or their welfare benefits would be cancelled, along with the benefits of the families they were born into. Because of such policies, especially prevalent in Southern states, sterilization of African Americans in North Carolina increased from 23% of the total in the 1930s and 1940s to 59% at the end of the 1950s, and rose further to 64% in the mid-1960s.

In mid-1973 news stories revealed the forced sterilization of poor black women and children, paid for by federal funds. Two girls of the Relf family in Mississippi, deemed mentally incompetent at ages 12 and 14, and also 18-year-old welfare recipient Nial Ruth Cox of North Carolina, were prominent cases of involuntary sterilization. Jet magazine presented the story under the headline "Genocide". Critics said these stories were publicized by activists against legal abortion. According to Gregory Price, government policies led to higher rates of sterilization amongst black Americans than white on the basis of racist beliefs. He writes that in the early 1900s, the goal of eugenicists was to create a "biologically fit" population, and that these standards deliberately excluded black people, who were claimed to not be capable of making legitimate contributions to the national economy.

== Systemic racism as genocide ==
We Charge Genocide estimated 30,000 more black people died each year due to various racist policies and that black people had an 8-year shorter life span than white Americans. In this vein, Historian Matthew White estimates that 3.3 million more non-white people died from 1900 up to the 1960s than they would have if they had died at the same rate as white people.

=== Effects of wars on black communities ===
African Americans pushed for equal participation in US military service in the first part of the 20th century and especially during World War II. Finally, President Harry S. Truman signed legislation to integrate the US military in 1948. However, Selective Service System deferments, military assignments, and especially the recruits accepted through Project 100,000 resulted in a greater representation of blacks in combat in the Vietnam War in the second half of the 1960s. African Americans represented 11% of the US population but 12.6% of troops sent to Vietnam. Cleveland Sellers said that the drafting of poor black men into war was "a plan to commit calculated genocide". Former SNCC chairman Stokely Carmichael, black congressman Adam Clayton Powell Jr. and SNCC member H. Rap Brown agreed. In October 1969, King's widow Coretta Scott King spoke at an anti-war protest held at the primarily black Morgan State College in Baltimore. Campus leaders published a statement against what they termed "black genocide" in Vietnam, blaming US President Richard Nixon as well as South Vietnamese leaders President Nguyễn Văn Thiệu and Vice President Nguyễn Cao Kỳ.

Author James Forman Jr. has called the war on drugs "a misstep [that] is so damaging that future generations are left shaking their heads in disbelief". According to Forman, the war on drugs has had widespread effects, including an increased punitory criminal justice system that disproportionately affected Black Americans, especially those in low-income neighborhoods. Forman further writes that one consequence is that, even though black and white people have similar rates of drug use, black people are more likely to be punished for it by the judicial system.

Elizabeth Hinton writes that two other "wars" that have had detrimental effects on the black community – the War on Poverty and war on crime. According to Hinton black men are imprisoned at a rate of 1 in 11. This topic is also explored in Michelle Alexander's The New Jim Crow. Alexander argues that, despite many Americans wanting to believe that the election of President Obama ushered in a new age where race no longer mattered, or at least not as much, America is still deeply affected by its racial history. Alexander writes that there has been a "systemic breakdown of black and poor communities devastated by mass unemployment, social neglect, economic abandonment, and intense police surveillance". President Lyndon B. Johnson, stated in a commencement speech delivered at Howard University that there is a stark contrast between black and white poverty. Keeanga-Yamahtta Taylor writes that the contrast is a result of systemic injustices carried out over the course of centuries against the black community.

=== Prison ===
In 1969, H. Rap Brown wrote in his autobiography, Die Nigger Die!, that American courts "conspire to commit genocide" against blacks by putting a disproportionate number of them in prison. Political scientist Joy A. James wrote that "antiblack genocide" is the motivating force which explains the way that US prisons are filled largely with black prisoners. Author and former prisoner Mansfield B. Frazier contends that the rumor in American ghettos "that whites are secretly engaged in a program of genocide against the black race" is given "a measure of validity" by the number of "black men of child-producing age" who are imprisoned for crimes for which men of other races are not.

The book New Directions for Youth Development describes the school-to-prison pipeline along with ways to end it. It states that "The public school system in the United States, like the country as a whole, is plagued by vast inequalities—that all too frequently are defined along lines of race and class." Over time, as schools have become harsher in enforcing their policies and disciplining students, the criminal justice system has also become harsher in dealing with children. The book states that "Since 1992, fortyfive states have passed laws making it easier to try juveniles as adults, and thirty-one have stiffened sanctions against youths for a variety of offenses".

The way in which certain drugs are criminalized also factors into the large disparities in involvement in the prison system between black and white communities. For instance "conviction for crack selling (more heavily sold and used by people of color) [results] in a sentence 100 times more severe than for selling the same amount of powder cocaine (more heavily sold and used by whites)".

== Reproductive rights ==
=== Birth control ===
Although black women had been practising forms of birth control since their arrival in America, certain African-American leaders also taught that political power came with greater population and so opposed contraception. In 1934, Marcus Garvey and his Universal Negro Improvement Association resolved that birth control would lead to the eradication of black people, terming it "race suicide" (Theodore Roosevelt had made the same comment about white people in 1905).

The combined oral contraceptive pill, popularly known as "the Pill", was approved for sale as a medicine in US markets in 1957, and in 1961, the use of it for birth control was also approved. In 1962, civil rights activist Whitney Young told the National Urban League not to support birth control for blacks. Marvin Davies, leader of the Florida chapter of the NAACP, said that black women should reject birth control and produce more babies so that black political influence would increase in the future.

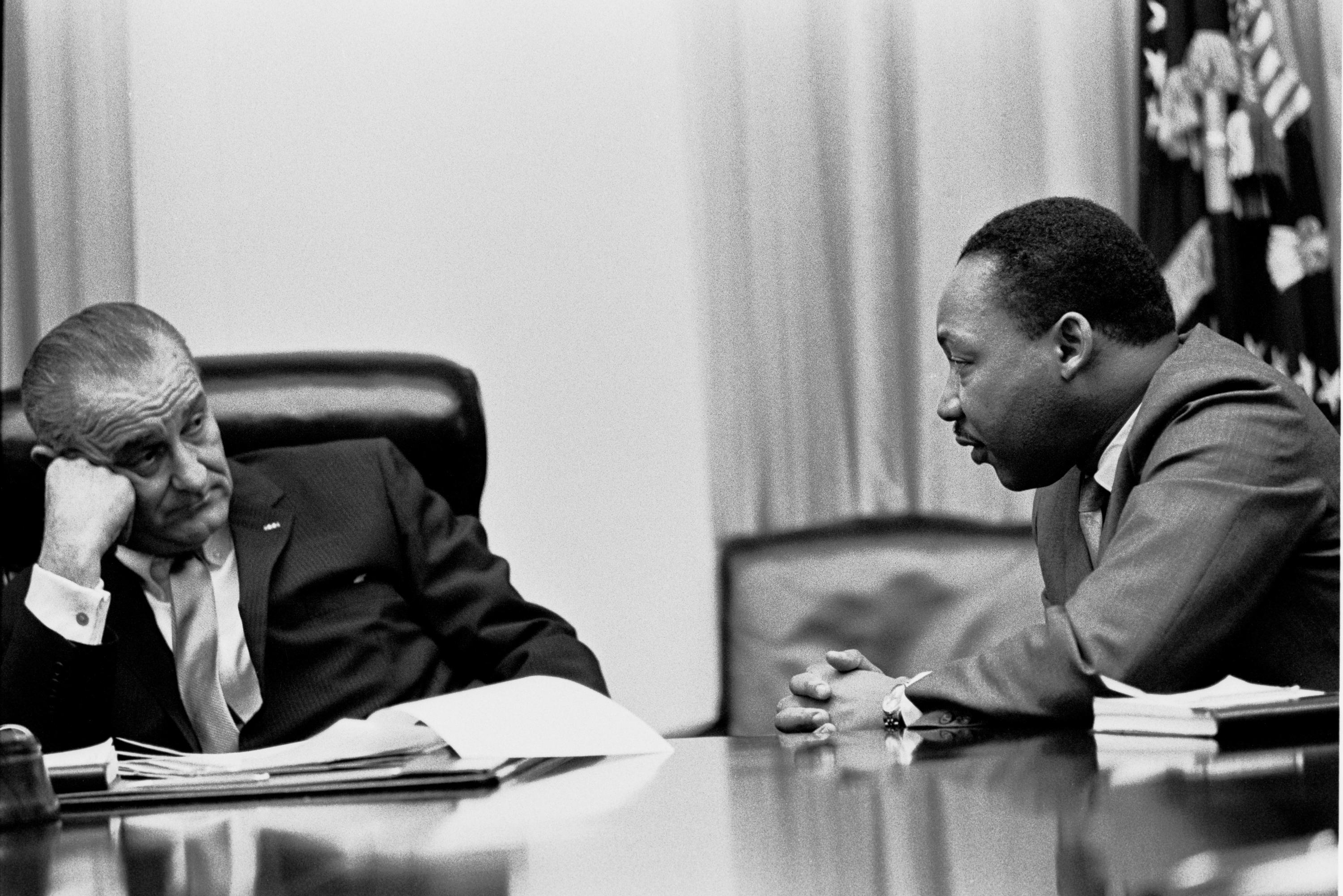
Lyndon B. Johnson and Martin Luther King Jr. agreed that birth control was beneficial to poor black families.

Ideas of reproductive fitness were still at the center of American family planning in the 1960s. Physicians preferred to prescribe the Pill to white middle-class women and the IUD to poor women, especially poor women of color, because the IUD granted them greater control over "unfit" women's behavior. Guttmacher viewed the IUD as an effective method of contraception for individuals in "underdeveloped areas where two things are lacking: one, money and the other sustained motivation".

Once the method was approved for use in the United States, the majority of Pill users were white and middle-class women. In part, this trend reflects doctors' preference to prescribe the Pill to members of this population, and it also reflects the cost of the drug. Until the late 1960s, the Pill was prohibitively expensive for working-class and poor women.

After President Lyndon B. Johnson passed legislation for government funding of birth control as a part of his War on Poverty in 1964, Black activists such as Dr. Charles Greenlee and William "Bouie" Haden allied with social conservatives, such as Catholic priest Charles Owen Rice, to express concern about government-sponsored efforts to limit the Black population. Cecil B. Moore, head of the NAACP chapter in Philadelphia, spoke out against a Planned Parenthood effort to establish a stronger presence in northern Philadelphia; the population in the targeted neighborhoods was 70% black. Moore said that it would be "race suicide" if blacks embraced birth control.

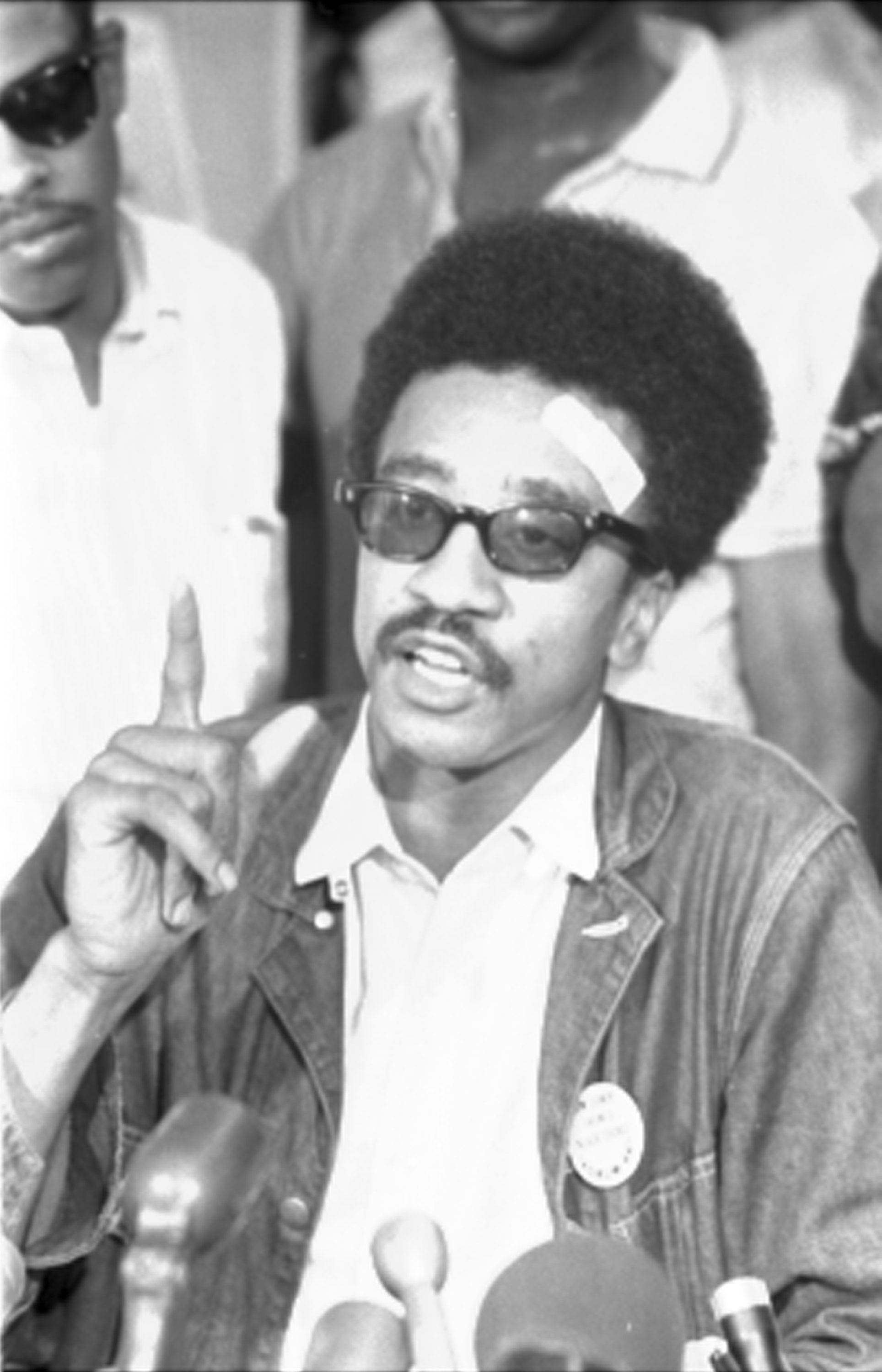
H. Rap Brown said that black genocide was based on four factors, including birth control.

From 1965 to 1970, Black men aligned with conservative and religious groups—especially younger men from poverty-stricken areas—spoke out against birth control by denouncing it as part of a plot to commit a genocide against black people. The Black Panther Party and the Nation of Islam were the strongest critics of birth control. The Black Panther Party identified a number of injustices as factors which contributed to black genocide, including social ills that were more serious in black populations than they were in white populations, such as drug abuse, prostitution and sexually transmitted diseases. Other injustices included unsafe housing, malnutrition and the over-representation of young black men on the front lines of the Vietnam War. Influential black activists such as singer/author Julius Lester and comedian Dick Gregory said that blacks should increase the size of their population by avoiding genocidal family planning measures. H. Rap Brown of the Student Nonviolent Coordinating Committee (SNCC) held the view that black genocide consisted of four elements: more blacks executed than whites, malnutrition in impoverished areas affected blacks more than it affected whites, the Vietnam War killed more blacks than whites, and birth control programs in black neighborhoods were trying to end the black race. A birth control clinic in Cleveland, Ohio, was torched by black militants who stated that it contributed to black genocide.

Black Muslims said that birth control was against the teachings of the Koran, because in Muslim societies, the primary role of women is the production of children. In this context, the black Muslims believed that birth control was part of a genocidal attack which was being launched against them by whites. The Muslim weekly journal, Muhammad Speaks, contained many articles which demonized birth control.

In Newark, New Jersey, in July 1967, the Black power movement held its first convention: the National Conference on Black Power. The convention identified several means by which whites were attempting to annihilate blacks. Injustices in housing practices, reductions in welfare benefits, and government-subsidized family planning were all identified as elements of "black genocide". Ebony magazine printed a story in March 1968 in which it was revealed that poor blacks believed that a conspiracy to commit genocide against black people was the impetus behind government-funded birth control.

Reverend Martin Luther King Jr., was a strong proponent of birth control for blacks. In 1966, he won the Margaret Sanger Award in Human Rights, an award which honors the tireless birth control activism of Margaret Sanger, a co-founder of Planned Parenthood. King emphasized the fact that birth control gave the black man better command of his personal economic situation, keeping the number of his children within his monetary means. In April 1968, Martin Luther King Jr., was shot and killed. In 1971, Charles V. Willie wrote that among African Americans, this event marked the beginning of serious reflection "about the possibility of [black] genocide in America. There were lynchings, murders, and manslaughters in the past. But the assassination of Dr. King was too much. Many blacks believed that Dr. King had represented their best... If America could not accept Dr. King, then many felt that no black person in America was safe."

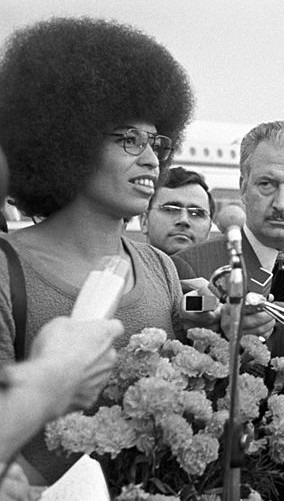
Angela Davis said that equating birth control with black genocide appeared to be "an exaggerated—even paranoiac—reaction".

Black women were generally critical of the Black Power Movement's rejection of birth control. In 1968, a group of black radical feminists in Mt. Vernon, New York issued "The Sisters Reply"; a rebuttal which said that birth control gave black women the "freedom to fight the genocide of black women and children", referring to the greater death rate among children and mothers in poor families. Frances M. Beal, co-founder of the Black Women's Liberation Committee of the SNCC, refused to believe that the black woman must be subservient to the black man's wishes. Angela Davis and Linda LaRue denounced the limitations which male Black Power activists imposed upon female Black Power activists, limitations which directed them to serve as mothers by producing "warriors for the revolution". Toni Cade said that indiscriminate births would not bring the liberation of blacks closer to realization; she advocated the use of the Pill as a tool to help black women space out the births of black children, to make it easier for families to raise them. The Black Women's Liberation Group accused "poor black men" of failing to support the babies which they helped produce, therefore supplying young black women with a reason to use contraceptives. Dara Abubakari, a black separatist, wrote that "women should be free to decide if and when they want children". A 1970 study found that 80% of black women in Chicago approved of birth control, and it also found that 75% of women were using it during their child-bearing years. A 1971 study found that a majority of black men and women were in favor of government-subsidized birth control.

In Pittsburgh, Pennsylvania, a community struggle both for and against the establishment of a birth control clinic in the Homewood area of east Pittsburgh made national news. Women in Pittsburgh had lobbied for the establishment of a birth control clinic in the 1920s and they were relieved when the American Birth Control League (ABCL) established one in 1931. The ABCL changed its name to Planned Parenthood in 1942. The Pittsburgh clinic initiated an educational outreach program to poor families in the Lower Hill District in 1956. This program was twinned into the poverty-stricken Homewood-Brushton area in 1958. Planned Parenthood considered opening another clinic there, and it conducted meetings with community leaders. In 1963 a mobile clinic was moved around the area. In December 1965, the Planned Parenthood Clinic of Pittsburgh (PPCP) applied for federal funding based on the war on poverty legislation which Johnson had promoted. In May 1966, the application was approved, and the PPCP began to establish clinics throughout Pittsburgh, a total of 18 clinics were established throughout Pittsburgh by 1967, 11 of these clinics were placed in poor districts and they were also subsidized by the federal government. In mid-1966, the Pennsylvania state legislature held family planning funds up in committee. Catholic bishops gained media exposure for asserting that Pittsburgh's birth control efforts were a form of covert black genocide. In November 1966, the bishops said that the government was coercing poor people to have smaller families. Some black leaders such as local NAACP member Dr. Charles Greenlee supported the bishops' assertion that birth control was black genocide. Greenlee said that Planned Parenthood was "an honorable and good organization" but he also said that the federal Office of Economic Opportunity was sponsoring genocidal programs. Greenlee said that "the Negro's birth rate is the only weapon he has. When he reaches 21 he can vote." Greenlee targeted the Homewood clinic for closure; in doing so, he allied himself with black militant William "Bouie" Haden and Catholic prelate Charles Owen Rice in order to speak out against black genocide, and he also spoke out against the PPCP's educational outreach program. Planned Parenthood's Director of Community Relations Dr. Douglas Stewart said that the false charge of black genocide was harming the national advancement of blacks. In July 1968, Haden announced that he was willing to blow up the clinic in order to prevent it from operating. The Catholic church paid him a $10,000 salary, igniting an outcry in Pittsburgh's media. Bishop John Wright was called a "puppet of Bouie Haden". The PPCP closed the Homewood clinic in July 1968 and it also ended its educational program because it was concerned about violence. The black congregation of the Bethesda United Presbyterian Church issued a statement in which it said that accusations of black genocide were "patently false". A meeting to discuss the issue was scheduled for March 1969. About 200 women, mostly black, appeared in support of the clinic, and it was reopened. This event was seen as a major defeat for the black militant notion that government-funded birth control was black genocide.

Other prominent black advocates for birth control included Carl Rowan, James Farmer, Bayard Rustin, Jerome H. Holland, Ron Dellums and Barbara Jordan.

In the US in the 21st century, black women are most likely to be at risk for unintended pregnancies: 84% of black women of reproductive age use birth control, in contrast to 91% of Caucasian and Hispanic women, and 92% of Asian American women. This situation results in black women having the highest rate of unintended pregnancies—in 2001, almost 10% of black women who gave birth between the ages of 15 and 44 had unintended pregnancies, which was more than twice the rate of unintended pregnancies among white women. Poverty contributes to these statistics, because low-income women are more likely to experience disruptions in their lives; disruptions which affect the steady use of birth control. People who live in poor areas are more suspicious of the health care system, and as a result, they may reject medical treatment and advice, especially, they may reject less-critical wellness treatments such as birth control.

=== Abortion ===
Slave women brought with them from Africa the knowledge of traditional folk birth control practices, and of abortion obtained through the use of herbs, blunt trauma, and other methods of killing the fetus or producing strong uterine cramps. Slave women were often expected to breed more slave children to enrich their owners, but some quietly rebelled. In 1856 a white doctor reported that a number of slave owners were upset that their slaves appeared to hold a "secret by which they destroy the foetus at an early age of gestation". However, this folk knowledge was suppressed in the new American culture, especially by the nascent American Medical Association, and its practice fell away.

After slavery ended, black women formed social groups and clubs in the 1890s to "uplift their race". The revolutionary idea that a black woman might enjoy a full life without ever being a mother was presented in Josephine St. Pierre Ruffin's magazine The Woman's Era. Knowledge was secretly shared among clubwomen regarding how to find practitioners offering illegal medical or traditional abortion services. Working-class black women, who were more often forced into having sex with white men, continued to have a need for birth control and abortions. Black women who earned less than $10 per day paid $50 to $75 for an illegal and dangerous abortion. Throughout the 20th century, "backstreet" abortion providers in black neighborhoods were also sought out by poor white women who wanted to rid themselves of pregnancies. Abortion providers who were black were prosecuted much more often than white ones were.

During this time the Black Panthers printed pamphlets which described abortion as black genocide, expanding on their earlier stance with regard to family planning. However, most minority groups stood in favor of the decriminalization of abortion; The New York Times reported in 1970 that more non-white women than white women died as a result of "crude, illegal abortions". Legalized abortion was expected to produce fewer deaths of the mother. A poll in Buffalo, New York, conducted by the National Organization for Women (NOW), found that 75% of blacks supported the decriminalization of abortion.

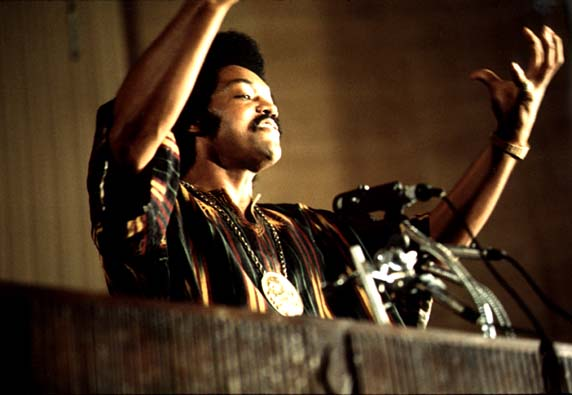
In the 1970s, Jesse Jackson spoke out against abortion as a form of black genocide.

After the January 1973 Roe v. Wade Supreme Court decision made abortion legal in the US, Jet magazine publisher Robert E. Johnson authored an article titled "Legal Abortion: Is It Genocide Or Blessing In Disguise?" Johnson cast the issue as one which polarized the black community along gender lines: black women generally viewed abortion as a "blessing in disguise" but black men such as Reverend Jesse Jackson viewed it as black genocide. Jackson said he was in favor of birth control but not abortion. The next year, Senator Mark Hatfield, an opponent of legal abortion, emphasized to Congress that Jackson "regards abortion as a form of genocide practiced against blacks".

In Jet, Johnson quoted Lu Palmer, a radio journalist in Chicago, who said that there was inequity between the sexes: a young black man who helped create an unwanted pregnancy could go his "merry way" while the young woman who had been involved in it was stigmatized by society and saddled with a financial and emotional burden, often without a safety net of caregivers to sustain her. Civil rights lawyer Florynce Kennedy criticized the idea that black women were needed to populate the Black Power revolution. She said that black majorities in the Deep South were not known to be hotbeds of revolution, and that limiting black women to the role of mothers was "not too far removed from a cultural past where black women were encouraged to be breeding machines for their slave masters". In the Tennessee General Assembly in 1967, Dorothy Lavinia Brown, MD, the first African-American woman surgeon and a state assemblywoman, sponsored a proposed bill to fully legalize abortion. Later Brown, would say black women "should dispense quickly the notion that abortion is genocide". Rather, they should look to the earliest Atlantic slave traders as the root of genocide. Congresswoman Shirley Chisholm wrote in 1970 that the linking of abortion and genocide "is male rhetoric, for male ears".

However, a link between abortion and black genocide has been claimed by later observers. Mildred Fay Jefferson, a surgeon and an activist against legal abortion, wrote about black genocide in 1978, saying "abortionists have done more to get rid of generations and cripple others than all of the years of slavery and lynching." Jefferson's views were shared by Michigan state legislator and NAACP member Rosetta A. Ferguson, who led the effort to defeat a Michigan abortion liberalization bill in 1972. Ferguson described abortion as black genocide.

In 2009, American anti-abortion activists in Georgia revived the idea that a black genocide was in progress. A strong response from this strategy was observed among blacks, and in 2010 more focus was placed on describing abortion as black genocide. White anti-abortion activist Mark Crutcher produced a documentary called Maafa 21 which criticizes Planned Parenthood and its founder Margaret Sanger, and describes various historic aspects of eugenics, birth control and abortion with the aim of convincing the viewer that abortion is black genocide. Anti-abortion activists showed the documentary to black audiences across the US. The film was criticized as propaganda and a false representation of Sanger's work. In March 2011, a series of abortion-as-genocide billboard advertisements were shown in South Chicago, an area with a large population of African Americans. From May to November 2011, presidential candidate Herman Cain criticized Planned Parenthood, calling abortion "planned genocide" and "black genocide".

After Stacey Abrams lost the 2018 Georgia gubernatorial election, anti-abortion activist Arthur A. Goldberg wrote that she lost in part because of her stance in favor of abortion rights, which he said ignored "the staggering number of abortions in the black community" which amounted to black genocide. In 2019, The New York Times wrote that "the abortion debate is inextricably tied to race" in the view of black American communities that are challenged with many other racial disparities which together constitute black genocide.

A 2022 Pew Research Center survey found that black Americans favour legalized abortion for "most or all cases" at a rate of 68 percent, as opposed to 59 percent of white Americans.

== Reception ==
The Civil Rights Congress (CRC)'s We Charge Genocide petition was popular almost everywhere in the world except in the United States. In 1952, one American writer visiting India found that many people had become familiar with the cases of the Martinsville Seven and Willie McGee through the document. The petition was particularly well received in Europe, where it received abundant press coverage.

The U.S. State Department requested that the NAACP draft a press release repudiating the petition, but the board decided against it. The NAACP felt the petition reflected many of the NAACP's own views, and even drew on NAACP data about lynchings other racist incidents. I. F. Stone was the only white American journalist to write favorably of the document. Raphael Lemkin, who invented the term "genocide", said the African-American population was increasing in size so could not be facing genocide. He also accused the CRC of working for foreign agents and of distracting from alleged genocides in the Soviet Union. The United Nations did not acknowledge receiving the petition, but the CRC had not expected it to, given the strength of U.S. influence.

In 1976, white sociologist Irving Louis Horowitz published an analysis of black genocide in the United States. He says that genocide requires "conscious choice and policy" on behalf of the state, and that racist vigilantism and sporadic actions by individual whites were to blame for the various statistics which showed higher rates of death for black people than white people. Horowitz suggested that the U.S. government had not intentionally conspired to cause black genocide, and was only guilty of "benign neglect".

=== 21st century analysis ===
Critics of Horowitz, such as Seymour Drescher and Brandy Marie Langley, suggest there are contradictions in his analysis (e.g., he admits the KKK often had support from the police and state), and that his thesis fails because he uses only the Holocaust as a benchmark for genocide, which may be inappropriate or one-sided. Langley says that because state actors were "purposefully neglecting to recognize the dignity and [federal, constitutional] civil rights" of emancipated black people, such neglect was neither benign nor unintentional.

Historian Patrick Wolfe, a fellow of Harvard and Stanford, introduced the idea of "structural genocide", in which he suggests that non-physical forms of elimination can result in genocide – such as social, cultural and economic elimination – and that these can be ongoing processes as well as time-limited acts. He initially applied this model to explain Native American genocide, but extends it to cover other subjects of settler-colonial societies, including African Americans. Wolfe states that "elimination is an organizing principal of settler-colonial society rather than a one-off (and superseded) occurrence". He suggests that, because it is ongoing, the nature of this elimination can also change over time:

On emancipation, Blacks became surplus to some requirements and, to that extent, more like Indians. Thus it is highly significant that the barbarities of lynching and the Jim Crow reign of terror should be a post-emancipation phenomenon. As valuable commodities, slaves had only been destroyed in extremis. Even after slavery, Black people continued to have value as a source of super-cheap labour (providing an incitement to poor Whites), so their dispensability was tempered. Today in the US, the blatant racial zoning of large cities and the penal system suggests that, once colonized people outlive their utility, settler societies can fall back on the repertoire of strategies (in this case, spatial sequestration) whereby they have also dealt with the native surplus.

In 2013, political scientist Joy A. James wrote that the "logical conclusion" of racism in the United States is genocide, and that members of the black elite are complicit with white Americans in carrying out black genocide.

In 2021, Alex Hinton, director of the Center for the Study of Genocide and Human Rights at Rutgers University, says the original We Charge Genocide petition was "very compelling" but ahead of its time. He said, "While many may think that genocidal annihilation only looks like Nazi mass murder, the U.N. Genocide Convention clearly incorporates more nuanced forms of destruction than that." Like Wolfe, he suggests black genocide should be considered a form of structural genocide. He states that, despite Lemkin's objections, We Charge Genocide's claims were plausible according to Lemkin's own scholarship. (Note: Hinton writes:"Ironically, Lemkin's own early scholarship provided an important foundation for this view of genocide. When he coined the term 'genocide' in his 1944 book Axis Rule in Occupied Europe, Lemkin defined it as a 'coordinated plan of different actions aiming at the destruction of essential foundations of the life of national groups.' This process, Lemkin stated, had two phases: 'one, destruction of the national pattern of oppressed groups; the other, the imposition of the national pattern of the oppressor.' Such group destruction was carried out not just by killing but by political, social, cultural, economic, biological, religious, moral and physical means that crushed the 'spirit' of the victim group. This is exactly the sort of interwoven tapestry of group diminishment 'We Charge Genocide' sought to establish as constituting the genocide of Black Americans.")

== See also ==
- African-American history
- African Americans and birth control
- Afrophobia
- Black Lives Matter
- Black nationalism
- Black separatism
- Discrimination in the United States
- Eugenics in the United States
- History of the Southern United States
- Impact of the COVID-19 pandemic on African-American communities
- List of conspiracy theories
- List of expulsions of African Americans
- List of genocides
- Lynching in the United States
- Mass racial violence in the United States
- Mfecane
- Nadir of American race relations
- Native American genocide in the United States
  - Sterilization of Native American women
- Negrophobia
- Political positions of Herman Cain
- Race and health in the United States
- Racism against African Americans
- Racism in the United States
- Reconstruction era
- Reparations for slavery in the United States
- Sterilization law in the United States
- Transgender genocide
- Unethical human experimentation in the United States
  - Tuskegee syphilis experiment
- United States anti-abortion movement
- United States racial unrest (2020–2023)
- White supremacy#United States
- Medical Apartheid, by Harriet A. Washington (2007)
- The Delectable Negro, by Vincent Woodard (2014)
