= African Americans and birth control =

Human rights and access to reproductive healthcare

African Americans', or Black Americans', access and use of birth control are central to many social, political, cultural and economic issues in the United States. Birth control policies in place during American slavery and the Jim Crow era highly influenced Black attitudes toward reproductive management methods. Other factors include African-American attitudes towards family, sex and reproduction, religious views, social support structures, black culture, and movements towards bodily autonomy.

Prominent historical figures and black communities have debated whether Black Americans would benefit from the use of birth control or if birth control is inherently racist and designed to reduce the Black American population.

== Early sexual and reproductive violence ==
Before the abolition of American slavery, enslaved Black men and women were victims of legalized sexual and reproductive violence. Some sources estimate 58% of enslaved women and girls between the ages of 15 and 30 experienced sexual assault, often perpetrated by slave masters and other White men. White people saw Black women as objects used to meet the sexual needs of white men. They also experienced abuse at the hands of the wives of the White men. White men often raped and impregnated Black women to increase their enslaved population. In addition, enslaved African-American women were subject to frequent sexual exploitation through arranged marriages in order to produce children and sexually violent encounters initiated by other enslaved people. The Jezebel stereotype shifted blame onto Black women for their experiences with sexual violence and characterized them as hypersexual. This is a stereotype that has continued within modern times. Black men were publicly lynched and castrated by white people in order to assert dominance and reduce their reproductive control.

After the Emancipation Proclamation (1865) granted legalized freedom to enslaved Black people, Jim Crow laws and Black Codes perpetrated continuing sexual and reproductive abuse of Black people, particularly women. Laws against rape only protected White women and consequently failed to protect Black survivors of gang rape, genital mutilation, and lynching.

=== Medical abuse and Experimentation ===
Medical care for enslaved Black females was rare and often carried the risk of forced medical experimentation. J. Marion Sims, known as the "father of modern gynecology", victimized enslaved African-American females with his surgical experiments by not administering anesthesia. Other physicians coerced Black women into experiments, including ones developing the cesarean section and ovariotomy.

Black men were also subjected to unethical medical research, including the Tuskegee Syphilis Study. Conducted by the United States Public Health Service, the 40-year study examined the effects of untreated syphilis in Black men in Macon County, Alabama. During the study, a treatment for syphilis became available, but the subjects were misled and denied treatment. Many of the subjects' families contracted syphilis, while the men themselves either died or developed disabilities.

== Contraception ==
=== Enslaved people and birth control ===
In resistance to sexual exploitation and enslavement, Black women resorted to their own forms of birth control, drawing upon African folk remedies. Southern physician E. M. Pendleton reported that plantation owners frequently complained about "the unnatural tendency in the African female population to destroy her offspring".

=== Early organizations ===
After the slavery era, Black women mobilized in a variety of African-American women's clubs across the nation to exercise their political beliefs. Prominent leaders such as Harriet Tubman, Frances Harper, Ida B. Wells, and Mary Church Terrell led the founding of the National Association of Colored Women's Clubs in 1896. As issues of racism, segregation, and discrimination affected life for African-Americans in post-slavery America, the NACWC and its 1,500 affiliate clubs worked to promote racial uplift with the motto of "Lifting as We Climb", aspiring to show "an ignorant and suspicious world that our aims and interests are identical with those of all good aspiring women". Along with fundraising to establish schools and community services, the NACWC endorsed the movement for birth control as part of its agenda to empower Black women and help them achieve better lives.

In 1918, the Women's Political Association of Harlem became first African-American women's club to schedule lectures on birth control. The Harlem Community Forum invited Margaret Sanger to speak in March 1923 and the Urban League asked the American Birth Control League to establish a birth control clinic in the city. In 1925, Sanger attempted to open a clinic in the nearby, predominantly Black Columbus Hill area, but the clinic only ran for three months before closing due to low attendance. Much of the African-American population was transitioning out of the neighborhood and there was a lack of engagement with community leaders. Sanger continued to push for more clinics in struggling areas. In 1932, she opened a successful clinic in Harlem with support from Black churches and an all-Black advisory council. The clinic's clientele was about half Black and half White, and almost 3,000 people visited the clinic in its first year and a half.

=== Support ===
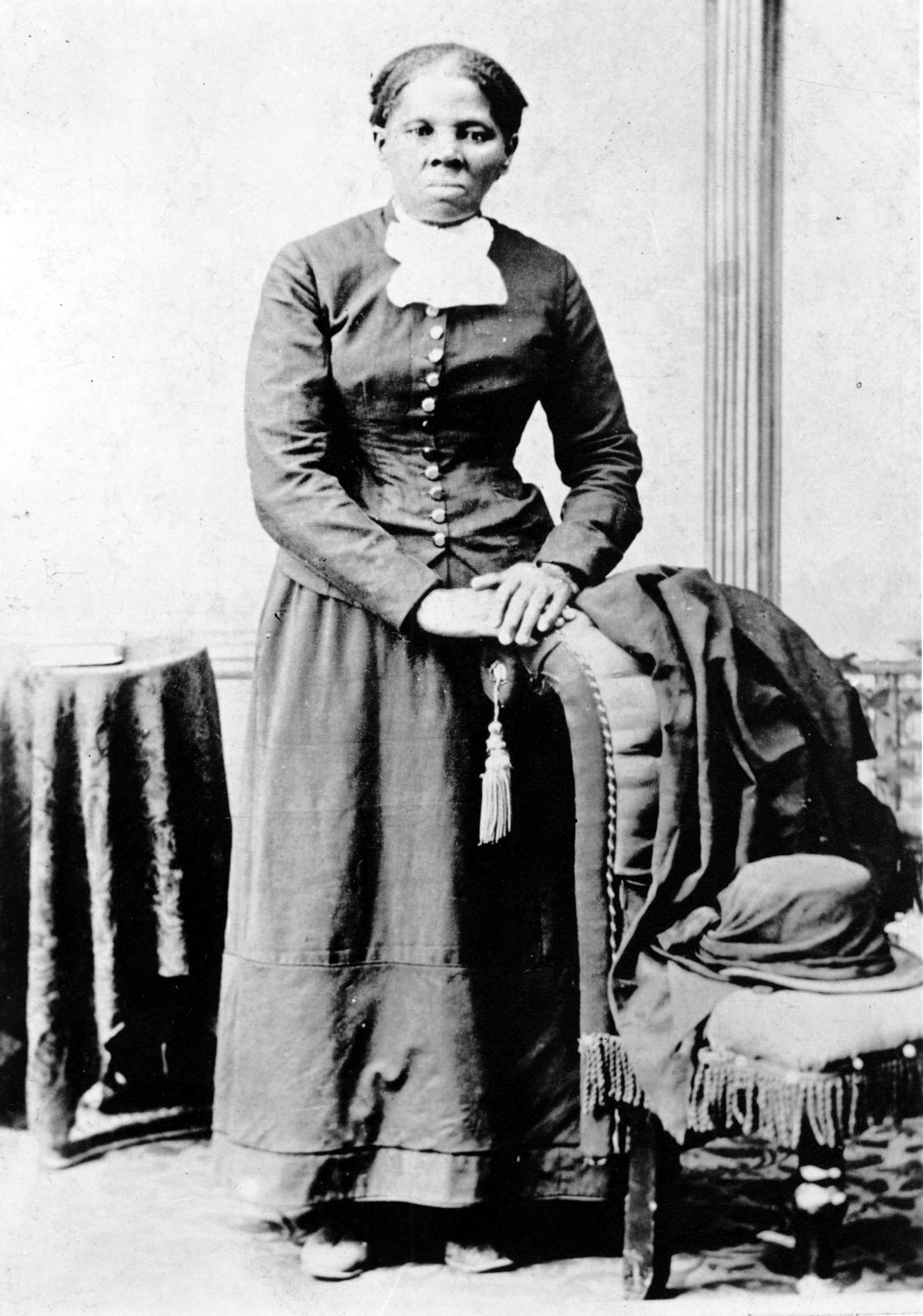
Harriet Tubman

In July 1932, Margaret Sanger published a special issue of her magazine entitled the Birth Control Review. The issue was titled the Negro Number and called on prominent African-Americans to display why birth control was beneficial to the African-American community. Authors such as W.E.B. Du Bois and George Schuyler contributed to the magazine, each stating different reasons why they believed contraception was an asset for the Black community.

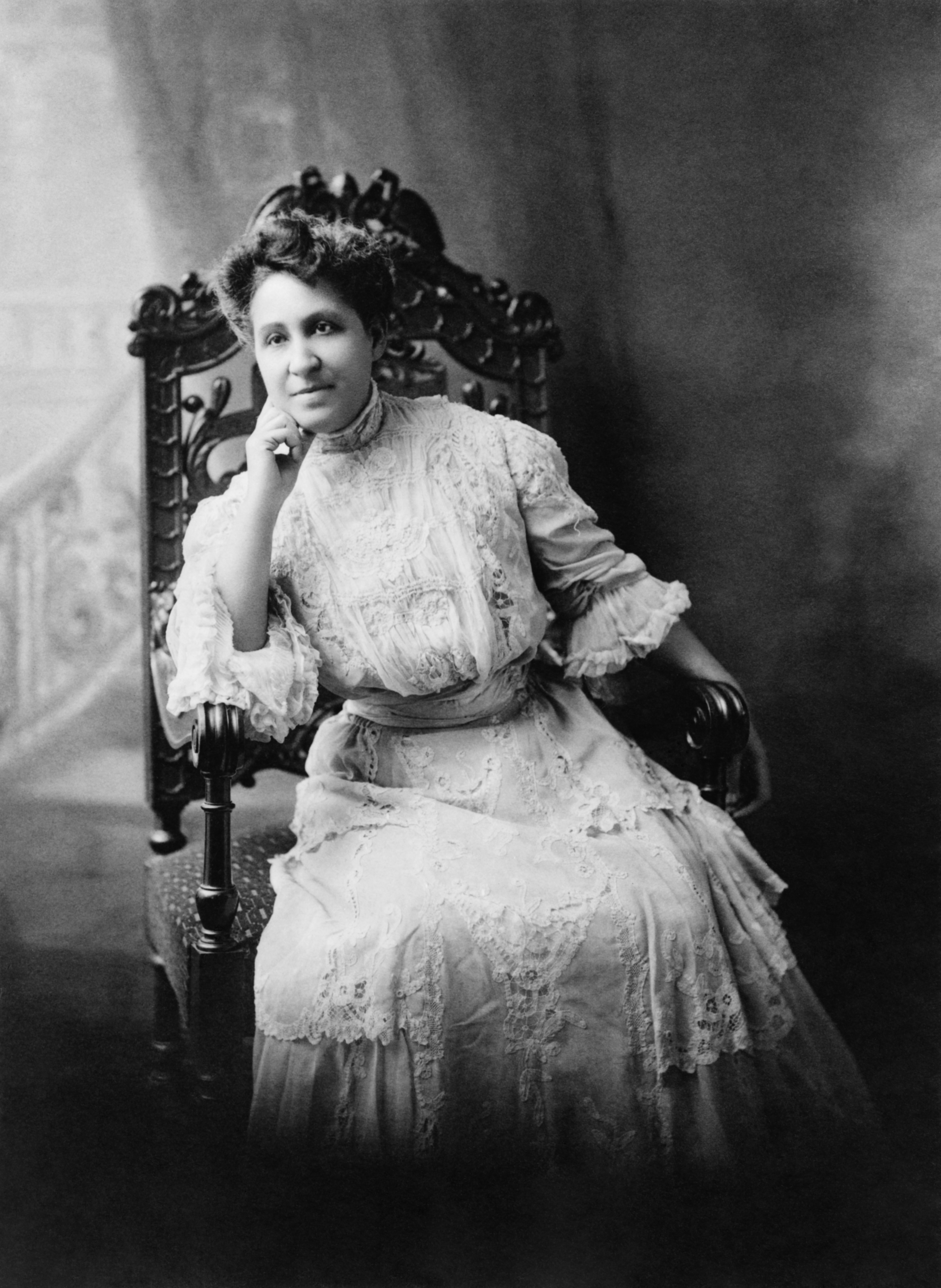
Mary Church Terrell

DuBois addressed the issue of birth control as a means of empowerment for African-Americans in the article "Black Folk and Birth Control". DuBois believed that voluntary birth control could serve as a family planning and economic tool that would empower Black families to have only as many children as they could care for. He also addressed the issue of African-Americans and the belief that in order to gain a substantial amount of power, Black people needed to produce more offspring. DuBois stated, "They must learn that among human races and groups, as among vegetables, quality and not mere quantity counts."

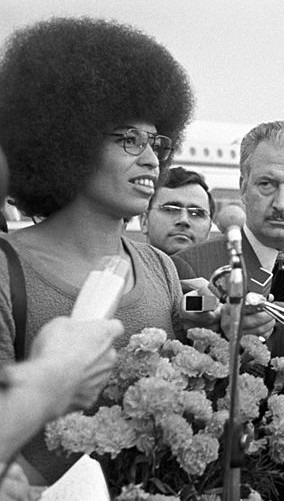
Angela Davis

George S. Schuyler based his entire article on the idea that the viability of black offspring was more important than the overall number of children produced. Schuyler's article, "Quantity or Quality," was a critique of the idea that sheer numbers, in terms of offspring, could bring African Americans the power and equality that they were working toward. Schuyler argued that the health of the Black family, and most specifically the health of the Black woman, should be the focus of the birth control debate. The article made it clear that if Black women were able to plan their pregnancies, then there would be a chance that the infant mortality rates would decrease. Schuyler observed, "If twenty-five percent of the brown children born die at birth or in infancy because of the unhealthful and poverty-stricken conditions of the mothers and twenty-five percent more die in youth or vegetate in jails and asylums, there is instead of a gain a distinct loss."

=== Opposition ===
Contraception was not unilaterally accepted in the African-American community during the early 20th century. Birth control to some seemed like a method of population control that could be administered by the government against Black people. Marcus Garvey and Julian Lewis were both against birth control for African-Americans for this reason, though their approaches differed. Garvey, as a Black Nationalist, believed in the "power in numbers" theory when it came to how Black people would obtain power in the U.S. Garvey was also a Roman Catholic, which may have affected his viewpoint. Lewis took a more "scientific" approach to denouncing contraception.

== Abortion ==
Abortion continues to be a highly contested topic in the African-American community with reasons that differ from those within the mainstream abortion debate. Abortion and other forms of birth control have been stigmatized within the Black community due to the traumatic history of involuntary sterilizations that many African-American women were subjected to throughout the 20th century, as well as the history of abortion and infanticide during United States slavery.

Angela Davis, a Black feminist activist and scholar, argued that Black women were not pro-abortion, but believe in abortion rights. "If ever women would enjoy the right to plan their pregnancies, legal and accessible birth control measures and abortions would have to be complemented by an end to sterilization abuse. Davis speaks on the history of abortion and infanticide in the African-American community in Women, Race and Class. Her response to Pendleton:

"Why were self-imposed abortions and reluctant acts of infanticide such common occurrences during slavery? Not because Black women had discovered solutions to their predicament, but rather because they were desperate. Abortions and infanticides were acts of desperation, motivated not by the biological birth process but by the oppressive conditions of slavery. Most of these women, no doubt, would have expressed their deepest resentment had someone hailed their abortions as a stepping stone toward freedom."

Shirley Chisholm spoke to the debate from a political perspective in 1970. Chisholm described the decriminalization of abortions as a necessary step toward the safety of women. "Experience shows that pregnant women who feel that they have compelling reasons for not having a baby, or another baby, will break the law and even worse, risk injury or death if they must get one. Abortions will not be stopped."

The Supreme Court Decision to overturn Roe V. Wade on June 24, 2022, led to economic and health concerns for all women and specifically concerns for Black women. The legalities of abortions are now decided by state and local laws, meaning some women will have to travel to obtain a legal abortion or worry of facing criminal charges. In 2019, 38% of abortions were among Black women, 33% were among White women, 21% among Hispanic women, and 7% among women of other racial and ethnic groups. The lack of access to health care is one reason why the abortion rate for women of color is higher than white women. White women were also reported to have more access to contraceptives than minorities at 69% versus Black women at 61%. In 2008, Black women accounted for over 28% of abortions annually, more than any other racial demographic: this statistic is consistent with the reality that African-American women also experience high rates of unplanned pregnancy, largely due to a lack of access to comprehensive reproductive care and access to birth control.

=== Organizations ===
As the abortion debate has continued, there has been a surge of Black pro-life groups. These organizations believe that the womb is the "most dangerous place for an African-American child." Similar to the views of Marcus Garvey, Black anti-abortionists view the abortion movement as an attack on the African-American community as a form of genocide and a push for eugenics. Planned Parenthood and the actions of founder Margaret Sanger have become a focal point for these movements, believing their efforts continue with the goal of harming Black women.

=== Reproductive justice movement ===
Reproductive justice, a framework created by the Women of African Descent for Reproductive Justice, emerged in 1994 to catalyze a national movement that prioritized the needs of marginalized women, their families, and their communities. Reproductive justice is the "human right to maintain personal bodily autonomy, have children, not have children, and parent the children we have in safe and sustainable communities." This framework transcends the argument of choice that the women's rights, reproductive rights, and reproductive health movements emphasized, as these movements represent the needs of middle class and wealthy white women. Reproductive justice deems access to comprehensive reproductive care as essential. This includes the right to and equitable access to safe abortion as well as access to contraceptives, sexual education, STI prevention and care, and other ways to support families.

== Black nationalist parties ==
=== Background ===
Black nationalist parties in the late 1960s and early 1970s tended to view the use of contraceptives in black populations was at best, an ill-conceived public health measure, and at worst a front for a conspiracy of black genocide. For the most part, male-dominated black nationalists were opposed to the promotion of personal fertility control and protested against government-funded family planners who they viewed to be putting forth an agenda of black population control.

Much of the opposition to fertility control was sparked by the sterilization of Minnie Lee and Mary Alice in 1973. The sisters received federally funded birth control grants from the Office of Economic Opportunity (OEO). At the Montgomery Family Planning Clinic, Minnie Lee and Mary Alice, fourteen and seventeen years old at the time respectively, both underwent surgical sterilization without informed consent. Mrs Relf, their mother was unable to read and was coerced into signing parental consent forms without being able to understand the documents. Additionally, both sisters were forced by clinic staff to sign false documents indicating that they were over twenty-one. The family later filed a complaint through the Southern Poverty Law Center citing that the treatment of the sisters at the clinic was abusive and coercive because 1) neither the mother nor her daughters gave any indication of wanting to undergo surgical sterilization, 2) neither mother nor daughters met with the physician who would perform the operation before the fact, and 3) neither mother nor daughters received information about the consequences of tubal sterilization from a physician or member of the clinic staff. The Relf case prompted many other African-American, Native-American, and Latina women to come forth with similar stories of coercion. In light of this case, many black nationalist groups came to conflate any birth control movement with a larger conspiracy of black population control.

The most vocal of these black nationalist groups were the Black Panthers and the Nation of Islam. These two organizations argued that white government family planners posed a threat to the black population by offering them birth control without other health care measures, namely, preventive medicine and hospitals, pre-and postnatal care, nutritional advice, and dentistry. They argued that birth control services remained harmful without adequate solutions to health care problems related to poverty.

Additionally, other black groups and black scholars vocally criticized the targeting of poor black communities as centers for population control. Ron Walters, chairman of the department of political science at Howard University, a historically black university, was one of the most outspoken critics of population control aimed at black families. He advocated that black communities ought to be responsible for defining their own fertility programs and birth control policies. Members of the Urban League, NAACP, and the Southern Christian Leadership Conference, likewise criticized birth control programs throughout the 1960s. A particular point of contention was the lack of minority representation in Planned Parenthood.

However, as the feminist message of the right to abortion and birth control began to become more widespread and as black feminists became more vocal in advocating for birth control access, the views of many Black Nationalist parties began to adapt. By the mid-1970s, the federal government had reduced funding for fertility control and family planning programs were viewed as less favorable after Roe v. Wade, the landmark Supreme Court abortion case. Additionally, vocal criticism of federal family planning programs leads the government to refashion its rhetoric to be less targeted toward poor black communities. Given this context, groups such as the Black Panther's expanded their emphasis on total health care to include birth control and abortion when voluntarily chosen.

=== Black Panther Party ===
Since the foundation of the Black Panther Party in 1966, the organization rejected all forms of reproductive control, claiming that governmentally regulated reproductive control was genocidal for Black people. The Black Panthers and the Black Liberation Army, the military wing of the party, believed that armed Black revolution against White supremacy was possible. They saw targeted birth control as part of a governmental plot to reduce the number of Black people in the United States, to prevent such a revolution.

Their suspicious view of birth control changed throughout the 1970s. In 1971, women in the party pushed back against an anti-birth control position on the basis that large families are difficult to support. They argued that this difficulty would make it harder for both men and women to participate politically. In 1974. Elaine Brown took over leadership of the party and actively placed other female members in leadership positions. The FBI's crackdown in the Black Power movement in the 1970s led to the arrest and/or death of many male party leaders, further increasing the influence of women in the party.

Though male party leadership was reasserted by founder Huey P. Newton in 1976, Brown's tenure as leader of the party from 1974 to 1976 significantly changed the party's stance on birth control policies and other feminist causes. In particular, the party educated Black women on the dangers of forced sterilization and published articles on documented cases of coerced sterilization by the state. In an article published by the committee to End Sterilization Abuse, the Black Panthers asserted that as high as 20% of Black women in the United States had been sterilized. Additionally, the party shifted their rhetoric to emphasize the importance of health care and legal abortion in black communities.

=== Nation of Islam ===
The Nation of Islam, a black political and religious movement founded in the 1930s, was among the first to claim that fertility control was a form of genocide. In the 1960s, the group drew parallels between what they saw as genocidal population control in the United States and population control policies in third-world countries. While they maintained a hardline approach to birth control and abortion, the group also pushed for expanded health care for black communities and greater structural solutions to health problems linked to poverty.

== Sterilization ==
=== Early 1900s ===
The widespread practice of female sterilization began in the early 1900s. Throughout the 20th century, a majority of states passed laws allowing sterilization, and even requiring it in prescribed circumstances. The first sterilization statutes were passed in Indiana in 1907, and the last was passed in Georgia in 1970. Indiana's law allowed the "prevention of the procreation of, confirmed criminals, idiots, imbeciles, and rapists". The Supreme Court of Indiana declared this statute unconstitutional in 1921, but a similar law passed in 1927 was ruled constitutional. Over the next fifty years, laws resembling Indiana's were passed in 30 different states. These policies legalized forced sterilization for certain groups based on race and class, many of which were already marginalized. The landmark Supreme Court case Buck v. Bell (1927) upheld a state's right to forcibly sterilize a person considered unfit to procreate.

As early scientific genetic theories were emerging, eugenics (and thus sterilization) became an accepted way of protecting society from the offspring of those individuals deemed lesser than or dangerous to society—the poor, the disabled, the mentally ill, and particularly, people of color. Several states, most notably North Carolina, set up Eugenics Boards during this time period to review petitions from government and private agencies to perform sterilizations on poor, unwed, disabled women. The most popular form of female sterilization was tubal ligation, a surgical procedure that severs or seals a woman's fallopian tubes, permanently preventing her from conceiving a child. In most cases, medical providers did not have to ask for the women's consent before performing the procedure.

=== Mid-century practices ===
Sterilization abuse of black women peaked in the 1950s and 1960s.

In 1970, black women were sterilized at over twice the rate of white women: 9 per 1,000 for black women as compared to 4.1 per 1,000 for white women. A second survey taken in 1973 indicated that 43% of women who underwent sterilization in federally financed family planning programs were also black. The intersection between race and low-income status made black women even more vulnerable to forced sterilization. Many of these black women were poor and could only rely on federally subsidized clinics or Medicaid for health care. Some women had experienced sterilization without consent after a doctor had agreed to perform an illegal abortion; others were pressured into allowing sterilization after receiving a legal hospital abortion. The patterns were even worse for non-married black women; as of 1978, such women were 529 percent more likely to receive tubal sterilization than their white counterparts.

During the 1960s and 1970s, punitive sterilization laws were proposed in California, Connecticut, Delaware, Georgia, Illinois, Iowa, Louisiana, Maryland, Mississippi, Ohio, South Carolina, Tennessee, and Virginia. The purpose of such laws was to reduce the number of children born to poor, unmarried mothers. Many of these laws contained statutes that withheld welfare benefits from women with illegitimate children. As intended, these laws disproportionately affected women of color, particularly African-American mothers. According to the ACLU, the Eugenics Board of North Carolina approved 1,620 sterilizations between 1960 and 1968. Of that number, 1023 were performed on black women and nearly 56 percent of those were performed on black women under 20 years of age.

In addition to government actions, abuses of power also took place in the American medical establishment. One of the most infamous examples of such abuses was the actions of South Carolina physician, Clovis Pierce. After accepting federal money to perform the sterilizations of 18 Medicaid patients in his clinic, he told women that he would only deliver their third pregnancy on the condition that they would submit to sterilization immediately afterwards. Pierce successfully defended himself against all lawsuits, and the South Carolina branch of the American Medical Association (AMA) unanimously supported Pierce's actions.

=== Relf v. Weinberger ===
In 1973, one particular case brought attention to the issue of forced sterilization. Twelve-year-old Minnie Lee Relf was sterilized without her consent or consent of a parent in a federally funded Department of Health, Education, and Welfare (HEW) health clinic—the Montgomery Family Planning Clinic—in Montgomery, Alabama. The official plaintiff was Lee's sister Katie Relf, and the defendant was Caspar Weinberger, secretary of the department.

The case challenged a state eugenics statute that authorized the procedure for "mentally incompetent" individuals without requiring the individual's consent or that of a guardian. Caseworkers had diagnosed Lee as intellectually disabled and thus were able to apply the statute, although the basis for their diagnosis was extremely questionable. As a result, both Lee and another sister, Mary Alice, received tubal ligations without their consent. Their mother, who was illiterate, unknowingly authorized the procedure by signing an "X", under the false impression that her daughters were receiving routine birth control injections.

The District Court decided in favor of the Relf sisters, declared certain HEW regulations covering sterilizations to be "arbitrary and unreasonable", and prohibited HEW from providing federal funds for the sterilization of "certain incompetent persons". The District Court also ordered HEW to amend its overall regulations. During the course of the litigation, HEW withdrew the challenged regulations. The Court of Appeals held that the case was rendered inconsequential by HEW's actions and remanded the case back to the District Court for dismissal.

== Anti-sterilization efforts ==
The issue of forced sterilization came to the forefront of activists' and scholars' minds in the 1960s and 1970s when evidence of widespread sterilization abuse on women of color was uncovered. Disproportionate numbers of black women, among other minority groups like Puerto Ricans and Native Americans, were receiving sterilizations, and many were completed in federally-funded clinics. In the 20th century, 32 states had federally-funded sterilization programs in place.

Anti-sterilization efforts in the 1970s came as the result of several high-profile sterilization abuse scandals. In 1972, President Nixon failed to enact HEW sterilization regulations that would have ended forced sterilization at federally-subsidized. This failure was exposed in 1973 due to Relf v. Weinberger. It was later revealed that between 100,000 and 150,000 poor women had been sterilized using federal dollars. Regulations were quickly put in place after the National Welfare Rights Organization sued HEW in 1974. These regulations "prohibited the sterilization of anyone less than 21 years of age, required a 72-hour waiting period, and protected a woman from losing her Aid to Families with Dependent Children (AFDC) support if she did not agree to sterilization". HEW, however, then created a program through which states were reimbursed for sterilizations of poor women.

The committee to End Sterilization Abuse (CESA) was founded in 1974 to combat abusive sterilization of women of color. It had a strong "anti-imperialist orientation" that attracted a multiracial membership, including white, Puerto Rican, and black women. In 1975, a coalition of groups formed an umbrella organization called the Advisory Committee on Sterilization. Members of the coalition included CESA and the National Black Feminist Organization, a group committed to addressing the double burden of racism and sexism faced by black women. The coalition formed to advise the New York City Health and Hospital's Corporation (HHC) on how to prevent forced or coerced sterilization within municipal hospitals.

The Advisory Committee created a set of guidelines that mandated a 30-day waiting period and required:

that consent not be given at the time of abortion or childbirth; that there be counseling on other fertility control options; that information on sterilization be given in the patient's native language; that the idea for sterilization must originate with the patient; that women could bring a patient advocate and another person of their choosing to accompany them through the process; and that the patient present written understanding of sterilization with an emphasis on its permanence.

In 1975, these guidelines were passed by HHC and enforced within municipal New York City hospitals, and in a 1977 City Council vote they were extended to all NYC hospitals. In 1978, the Nadler bill, named for state assemblyman Jerrold Nadler, was passed in the New York state legislature which outlined a set of sterilization regulations similar to the original ones passed by the HHC.

CESA disbanded after the passage of the Nadler bill, and with the HEW sterilization regulations in place, anti-sterilization efforts took the back burner for many feminist activists, though contemporary groups such as Incite! and SisterSong continue to address sterilization within the black community. In 2013, North Carolina became the first state to compensate its victims of forced sterilization with a payment of $50,000. In North Carolina, 7,600 people were sterilized between 1929 and 1974, 85% of them female and 40% of them nonwhite. Virginia became the second state to provide payments in 2015, giving each living victim $25,000.

== Organizations ==
In the 1980s and 1990s, black women active in mainstream white-led reproductive rights organizations founded their own organizations, such as the National Black Women's Health Project and African American Women Evolving.

=== National Black Women's Health Project (NBWHP) ===
The first National Conference on Black Women's Health Issues was held at Spelman College in 1983. The conference led to the foundation of the National Black Women's Health Project (NBWHP) with the intent of bringing African-American women's voices on health and reproductive rights to national and international attention.

Founded by health care activist Byllye Avery and health educator Lillie Allen, and incorporated as a nonprofit organization in 1984, the NBWHP was the first reproductive justice organization for women of color. The organization changed its name in 2003 to the Black Women's Health Imperative "to reinforce the need to move beyond merely documenting the health inequities that exist for Black women and to focus on actionable steps to eliminate them".

Based in Atlanta, Georgia, the NBWHP had established chapters in 22 states by the end of 1989 and popularized its message through conferences, workshops, and publications. The NBWHP participated in the 1985 United Nations World Conference for Women in Nairobi, Kenya. In 1990, NBWHP opened a public policy–based office in Washington, D.C. to more actively promote public policies that improve black women's health, such as advising President Clinton's abortion rights policies and regulation. By then, the NBWHP had moved from being a grassroots organization to advertising black women's health through public policy on a national stage.

=== African American Women Evolving (AAWE) ===
African American Women Evolving (AAWE) started in 1996 as a project within the Chicago Abortion Fund, a predominantly white abortion rights organization. AAWE was committed to holistic community health education and promoting black women's health. After organizing Chicago's first conference on black women's health, AAWE became an independent organization in 1999, incorporating under the National Network of Abortion Funds. The organization later changed its name to Black Women for Reproductive Justice (BWRJ). BWRJ conducted several surveys on African-American women's reproductive health and made that data publicly available. A predominantly grassroots organization, BWRJ emphasized making health care information and options available to African-American women in Illinois. The organization also worked on policy recommendations and advised, inter alia, the National Abortion Reproductive Rights Action League (NARAL).

== See also ==
- Black feminism
- Sterilization law in the United States
- Reproductive justice
- Intersectionality
