= Political positions of Herman Cain =

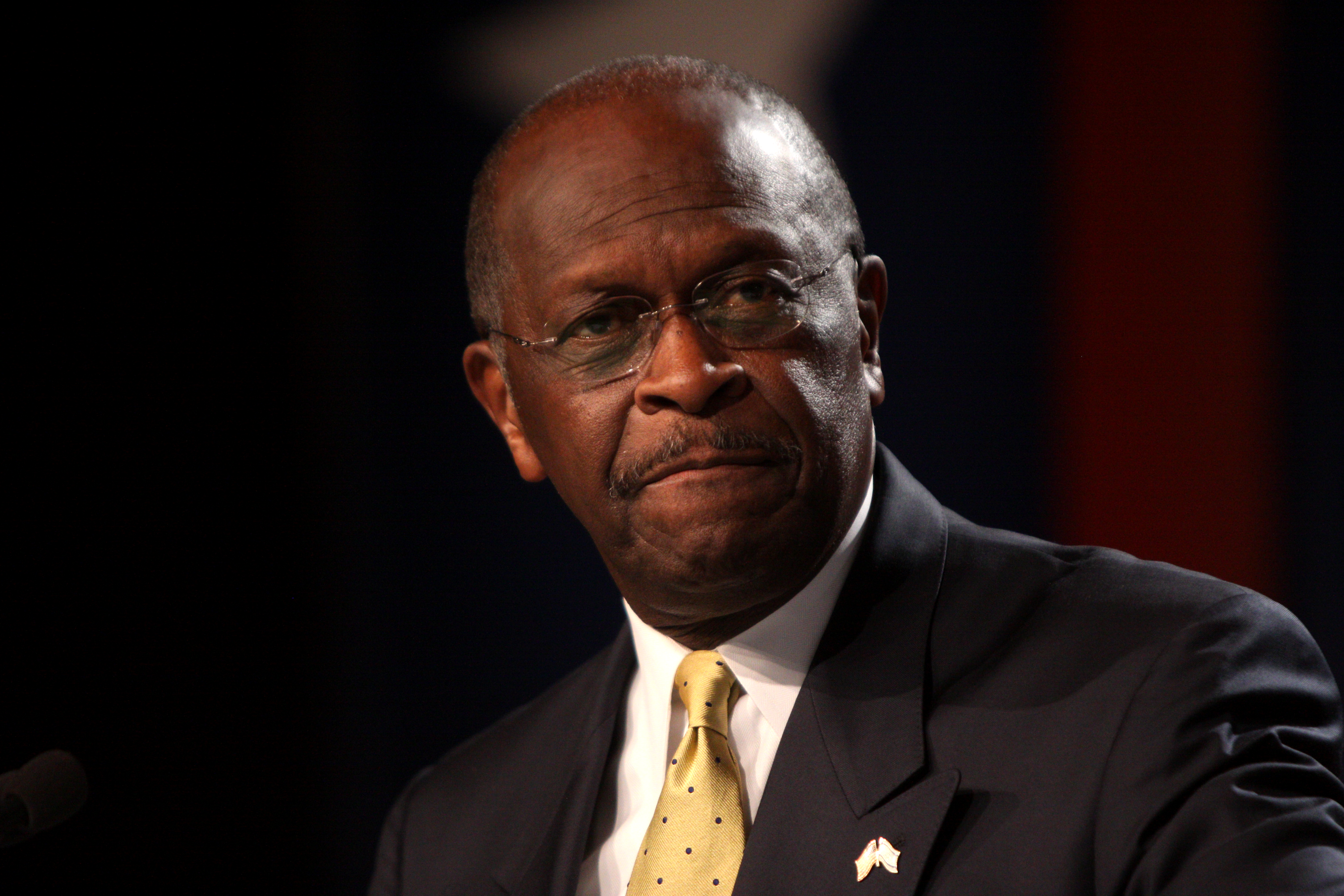
Cain in Washington, DC on October 7, 2011

Herman Cain was a businessman, radio talk show host, and author who ran in the United States for the Republican presidential nomination in 2012. Cain suspended his campaign on December 3, 2011.

== Economic issues ==
=== Bank bailouts, and "too big to fail" ===
Cain supported the Troubled Asset Relief Program (TARP) bank bailouts as a way to revive the economy, viewing it as an investment opportunity for the taxpayers. In a 2008 editorial, Cain wrote, "Owning a part of the major banks in America is not a bad thing. We could make a profit while solving a problem."

In May 2011 regarding his TARP support, Cain said, "I don't have any regrets ... I studied the situation. I didn't have trouble with the idea; I had trouble with its implementation, picking winners and losers."

In October 2011 Cain said he does not believe in the concept of "too big to fail" and had stated that he did not agree with the bailouts of "JP Morgan and the big banks on Wall Street".

=== Debt ceiling ===
Cain opposed increases in the debt limit for the federal government. He was quoted in a July 27, 2011, Politico article that: "I don't believe the debt ceiling should be raised. I don't believe the debt ceiling had to be raised ... Those are scare tactics. Those are simply exaggerated scare tactics."

=== Federal Reserve ===
Cain believed that there was no need for an audit of the Federal Reserve. Cain also commented that while such an audit is not a high priority for him, he does not object to it. He had stated that he finds it highly unlikely that anything would be found in such an audit, as the internal controls of the Fed are extensive, and that the Fed's problems stem from a politicization of the bank, rather than a failure to exercise due care for those internal controls.

=== Gold standard ===
Cain supported the Gold standard, saying that abandoning it "allowed Congress to inflate our currency whenever they overspent. Now look at the mess that we have."

=== Social Security ===
Cain had criticized the current implementation of Social Security, describing it as a "scam." He favored reforming the current system "through free market solutions."

Several times Cain had referenced the Chilean model of redoing social security. He supported the "Chilean model" for younger citizens while retaining the current system for current beneficiaries.

=== Taxes ===
Cain had supported shifting the tax burden from investment on to consumption. Cain had called for the elimination of taxes on capital gains, and suspending taxes on repatriated foreign profits. He also supported elimination of the estate tax; and in 2007 in testimony before the Senate Finance Committee called for the permanent repeal of that tax. Prior to his presidential campaign, Cain supported lowering the corporate tax rate from 35 to 25 percent.

Cain testified in front of the House Ways and Means Committee on May 9, 2002, in support of HR 2525, which would institute a national retail sales tax. According to the Washington Times, Cain had been known as a supporter of the broad national consumption tax on retail sales called the FairTax. During his presidential campaign in 2011, Cain introduced his signature "9–9–9" plan for a 9% tax on individuals, sales, and businesses.

==== 9–9–9 Plan ====
The "centerpiece" of Cain's presidential campaign introduced in August 2011 had been the "9–9–9 plan", which would replace all current taxes (including the payroll tax, capital gains tax, and the estate tax) with 9% business transaction tax; 9% personal income tax rate, and a 9% federal sales tax. According to Cain, corporations would be able to deduct costs of goods sold (provided the inputs were made in America) and capital expenditures, but not wages, salaries and benefits to employees. Deductions, except charitable giving, would be eliminated. The federal sales tax would not apply to used goods. Cain also said that the 9–9–9 Plan would lift a $430 billion dead-weight burden on the economy.

Cain stated the following summary about the 9–9–9 Plan:

Our current economic crisis calls for bold action to truly stimulate the economy and Renew America back to its greatness. The 9–9–9 Plan gets Washington D.C. out of the business of picking winners and losers, using the tax code to dole out favored, and dividing the country with class warfare. It is fair, simple, transparent and efficient. It taxes everything once and nothing twice. It taxes the broadest possible base at the lowest possible rates. It is neutral with respect to savings and consumption, capital and labor, imports and exports and whether companies pay dividends or retain earnings.

According to the analysis of Howard Gleckman the Tax Policy Center,

When you get right down to it, Cain's [9–9–9] plan is a 25 percent flat-rate consumption tax — not all that different from the FAIR tax that he says is his ultimate goal. This tax would be paid three times: first on wage income, again at the cash register as a sales tax, and yet again by businesses on their sales minus their cost of goods and services. For tax junkies, the first is a flat tax. The second is a retail sales tax and the third a business transfer tax. But they are all consumption taxes.

Although Cain had spoken about having designated 'empowerment zones' wherein a lower percentage, such as 3%, is paid instead, apart from this consideration, some have called Cain's plan more regressive than current policy, thinking it would raise taxes for most households, but cut them for those with the highest income.

Cain modified the plan for people under poverty level, reducing income tax for the poor to 0%, telling an audience in Detroit October 21 that the poorest Americans would get a "9–0–9" plan.

In an October 18, 2011 debate several of the other contenders for the GOP nomination attacked the plan, with candidate Rick Santorum referencing the Tax Policy Center's claim that 84% of Americans would pay more and that the plan would entail "major increases in taxes on people," a charge Cain had denied.

Some economists support the 9–9–9 Plan. The former Reagan Treasury official Gary Robbins stated that the 9–9–9 Plan will expand the GDP by $2 trillion, create 6 million new jobs, increase business investment by 33%, and increase wages by 10%. Also, Art Laffer, a famous supply-side economist, told HUMAN EVENTS that "Herman Cain's 9–9–9 plan would be a vast improvement over the current tax system and boom the U.S. economy.".

Conversely, other economists feel that the 9–9–9 plan would not stimulate the demand. Bruce Bartlett of the Reagan and George H.W. Bush administrations had written that Cain's plan "would increase the budget deficit without doing anything to stimulate demand".

The Economist criticized the 9–9–9 Plan stating that the Cain plan is not a reduction in the current corporate tax, but instead a new value added tax (VAT). The article also stated that Cain's final tax would be a 30% VAT, as compared to the 15% European Union value added tax. The Cain plan would change the 35% corporate tax to a 9% transaction tax, which would be flat except for payroll deductions for employees in empowerment zones.

Cain said the following about the 9% sales tax.

Unlike a state sales tax, which is an add-on tax that increases the price of goods and services, this is a replacement tax. It replaces taxes that are already embedded in selling prices. By replacing higher marginal rates in the production process with lower marginal rates, marginal production costs actually decline, which will lead to prices being the same or lower, not higher.

=== Welfare ===
Cain had criticized social welfare programs in the United States, stating that, "Programs today are designed to make people more dependent rather than less dependent."

== Social issues ==
=== Abortion ===
Cain identified as pro-life and opposed abortion in all cases, except where the mother's life is endangered. He believed that life begins at conception. He favored defunding Planned Parenthood, an organization he had referred to as "Planned Genocide" because he views it as guilty of genocide against black Americans.

=== Affirmative action ===
Cain supported ensuring that minorities receive the same opportunities as non-minorities. He does not agree with a "quota" style affirmative action system, which he believed gives an advantage to minorities simply because they are a minority.

=== Homosexuality ===
Cain was an opponent of the legalization of marriage for same sex couples in the United States. He supported the Defense of Marriage Act. He would seek to reinstate the Don't Ask, Don't Tell policy.

=== Islam ===
Cain had made a number of comments regarding American Muslims, and the hypothetical implementation of sharia law in the United States.

Some comments made by Cain regarding Muslims have caused controversy. He said that he was "uncomfortable" when he found that the surgeon operating on his liver and colon cancer was a Muslim. He later explained: "based upon the little knowledge that I have of the Muslim religion, you know, they have an objective to convert all infidels or kill them". He had also spoken of his distrust of another doctor when his name "sounded too foreign", telling the audience at a Biblically themed amusement park "My mind immediately started thinking, wait a minute, maybe his religious persuasion is different than mine! She [the nurse] could see the look on my face and she said, 'Don't worry, Mr. Cain, he's a Christian from Lebanon'. Hallelujah! Thank God!"

When asked in March 2011, Cain stated that he would not feel comfortable appointing a Muslim to his administration, or as a judge saying: "No, I will not ... There's this creeping attempt, there's this attempt, to gradually ease Shariah Law, and the Muslim faith into our government. It does not belong in our government".

He explained that his view was in reaction to a lawsuit in which the Council on American-Islamic Relations (CAIR) sought to block the implementation of a 2008 Oklahoma law which would have denied the use of Sharia law in state courts, and a Florida judge's decision to use Sharia law to settle a dispute within a mosque, despite the Court's decision not to use ecclesiastical law in the past (see Kreshik v. St. Nicholas Cathedral), and a case in New Jersey. Cain had described his position as being "careful and cautious."

He had also argued that Muslims should be prevented from building mosques in which to teach Jihad unless they have widespread approval from the local community. Cain campaigned for Muslims to be banned from building an Islamic Center at a site in Tennessee, claiming that it was "an infringement and an abuse of our freedom of religion" and "just another way to try to gradually sneak Shariah law into our laws". Defending himself against the suggestion that this would be discrimination, during an interview he said: "I'm willing to take a harder look at people who might be terrorists, that's what I'm saying". On July 18, 2011, Cain declared that communities in the United States had the "right" to ban mosques. He justified his view by arguing that Muslims are trying to promote Shariah law within the U.S., and also that his position did not amount to "religious discrimination". CAIR said that his comments were unconstitutional and could give legitimacy to anti-Muslim bigotry. Southern Baptist Convention leader Richard Land also said that Cain had disregarded the constitutional rights of Muslims.

On July 27, 2011, Cain met with Muslim leaders at the All Dulles Area Muslim Society (ADAMS) in Sterling, Virginia. He also toured the ADAMS mosque. After the meeting, he reiterated his opposition to the use of sharia law in courts, but said, "I am truly sorry for any comments that may have betrayed my commitment to the U.S. Constitution and the freedom of religion guaranteed by it. Muslims, like all Americans, have the right to practice their faith freely and peacefully."

== Foreign policy ==
=== About foreign policy ===
Cain defended his foreign policy knowledge. "I'm not supposed to know anything about foreign policy. Just thought I'd throw that out," he said to a Milwaukee Journal-Sentinel reporter while on his campaign bus on Monday, the afternoon after his interview with the paper's editorial board. "I want to talk to commanders on the ground. Because you run for president (people say) you need to have the answer. No, you don't! No, you don't! That's not good decision-making."

=== Cuba ===
Cain said he was not a fan of the "Wet feet, dry feet policy", in an interview with the television station WPLG.

=== Prisoner Exchanges ===
Cain said "I could see myself" freeing all Guantanamo detainees for one American hostage.

He later abandoned this position.

=== Anwar al-Awlaki ===
"I don't believe that the president of the United States should order the assassination of citizens of the United States," Cain said. "That's why we have our court system, and that's why we have our laws."

In a brief Q&A with our panel after his speech, Cain told the crowd that he fully supported Barack Obama's decision to strike Anwar al-Awlaki.

=== Libya ===
When asked about U.S. foreign policy toward Libya, "Cain repeated he would have 'assessed the [Libyan] opposition differently,' speaking in generalities about his problem-solving approach," and expressing confusion regarding the issue.

"Cain suggested on [November 18, 2011] that the Taliban were playing a role in Libya's new government."

=== Afghanistan ===
Cain had been supportive of a US presence in Afghanistan, and of the War in Afghanistan.

=== Iraq ===
Cain supported the Iraq War, and opposed any timetable for withdrawal of U.S. troops from Iraq, arguing it to be equivalent to surrender.

=== Iran ===
Cain favored a "diplomatic approach" to nuclear disarmament, but that the United States should be wary of the Iranian government.

=== Israel and Palestine ===
Cain supported Israel, and believed that the US should aid Israel in defending itself. After President Obama said that the starting point of negotiations for peace between the Israelis and the Palestinians should be based on the 1967 borders with mutually agreed-upon land swaps, Cain said:

I was shocked at the president's position, and I was equally shocked that he would unilaterally suggest that Israel would move the borders back which they acquired 44 years ago. This president threw Israel under the bus, there is no way around it. It demonstrates once again the arrogant disregard of this president for the opinion of the American people who like the relationship we have with Israel, and for Israel having the right to make its own decisions.

Cain supported the Palestinian right of return under Israeli conditions. He later commented that he had not understood the question while making his initial answer, but reiterated his support for it under Israeli conditions. This led to criticism regarding his lack of foreign policy experience due to his admitted unfamiliarity with the issue and need for subsequent clarification.

Cain was the only Republican presidential candidate at the former Fox News host Glenn Beck's "Restoring Courage" rally in Israel. Cain pronounced, "If you mess with Israel, you're messing with the USA."

After Vice President Joe Biden said that the Obama administration would not release Jonathan Pollard "over my dead body", Cain publicly disagreed with Biden's stance and said that as a supporter of Israel, he personally sympathizes with Pollard. However, he said he would have to review Pollard's case fully before deciding to free him.

In late October 2011, Cain said that President Obama's weakness on Middle East policies was emboldening what he referred to as the "so-called Palestinian people" to seek statehood at the United Nations.

=== North Korea ===
Cain opposed any form of negotiation with North Korea, and had argued for maintaining "peace through strength".

=== Russia ===
Cain opposed the New START treaty, because he believed that the US should retain freedom to develop nuclear weapons systems.

=== China ===
"Yes, they're a military threat," Cain said on the PBS NewsHour, in response to a question from Judy Woodruff. "They've indicated that they're trying to develop nuclear capability and they want to develop more aircraft carriers like we have. So yes, we have to consider them a military threat." "We already have superiority in terms of our military capability, and I plan to get away from making cutting our defense a priority and make investing in our military capability a priority," he said.

Cain addressed the gaffe in an interview with Ginni Thomas of The Daily Caller on Wednesday evening, and attempted to clarify his comments. "Maybe I misspoke," he said. "What I meant was China does not have the size of the nuclear capability that we have. They do have a nuclear capability. I was talking about their total nuclear capability."

=== Uzbekistan ===
Cain continued, "Knowing who is the head of some of these small insignificant states around the world, I don't think that is something that is critical to focusing on national security and getting this economy going. When I get ready to go visit that country, I'll know who it is, but until then, I want to focus on the big issues that we need to solve." While discussing his lack of knowledge about who the president of Uzbekistan was, Cain mispronounced the name of the country as "Ubeki-beki-beki-beki-stan-stan".

== Other issues ==
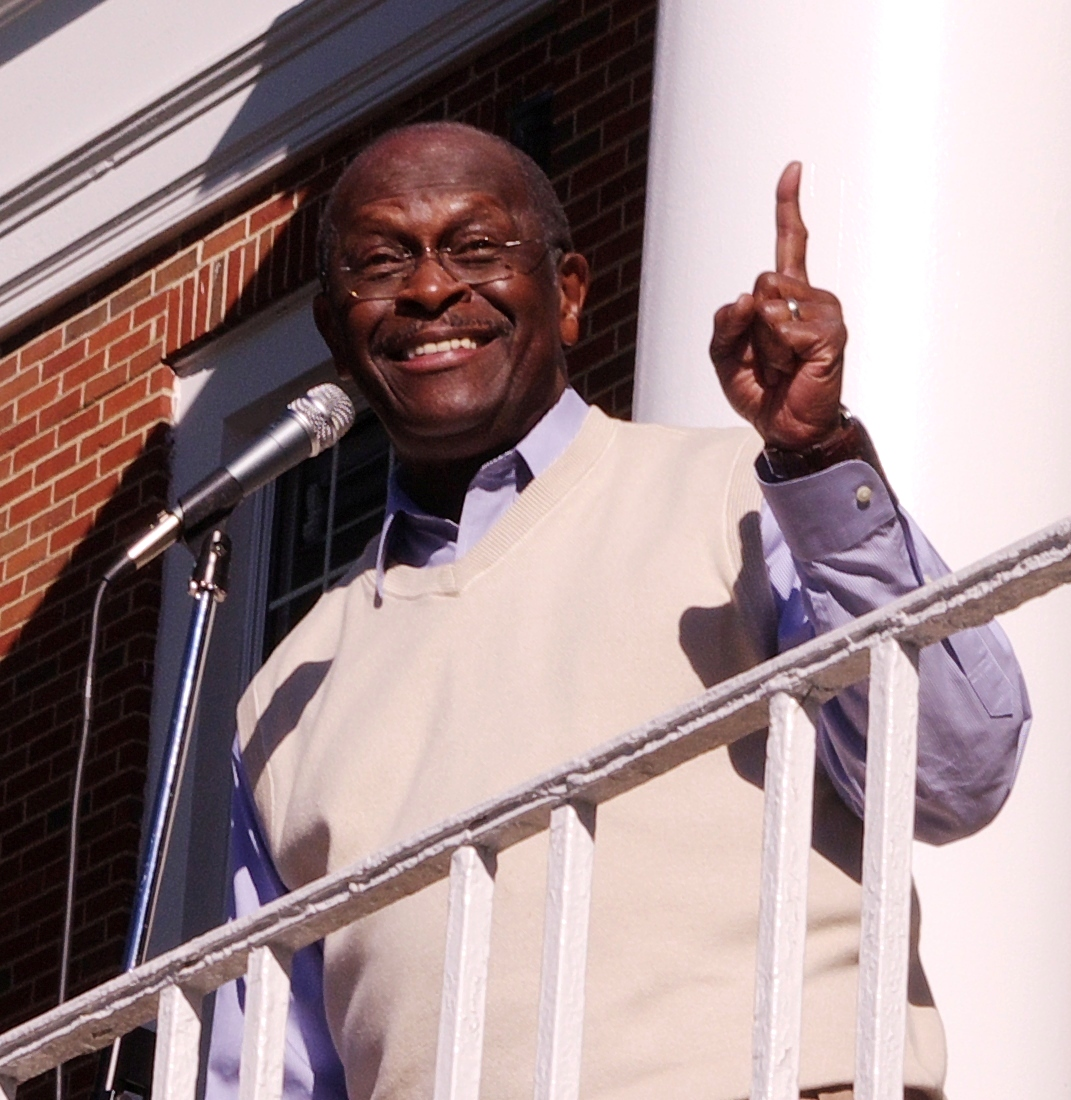
Cain in Tennessee on October 15, 2011

=== 2008 presidential election ===
In 2008, Cain initially praised Democratic candidate Barack Obama, saying of Obama that "His gift is the gift of oratory. That's not just the ability to speak, but the ability to connect with people." He also said that he would consider supporting Obama "under the right circumstances" but only if he made a serious attempt to "reach across the aisle". Cain instead endorsed Mitt Romney in the Republican primary, and eventually supported the GOP nominee, John McCain.

=== Capital punishment ===
Cain advocates the use of capital punishment in the United States. When asked if the death penalty should be thrown away when evidence comes into question, he replied "No. If you do away with it, that will only brainwash people into thinking that they can do whatever they want and get away with it."

=== Education ===
Cain opposed federal education schemes such as No Child Left Behind and advocated "unbundling" education, weakening the United States Department of Education in favor of state control of education. He had argued for greater performance-related pay for teachers, as well as for vouchers and charter school systems.

=== Energy and the environment ===
Cain favored offshore drilling and supported drilling in the Arctic National Wildlife Refuge (ANWR). He favored allowing consumers to choose alternative energy sources such as solar and wind through the private market instead of the government providing funding and incentives to particular corporations and industries.

Cain's ideology on the climate represents what is termed climate change denial. He had made statements indicating a belief that anthropogenic global warming is a hoax, referring to it as "poppycock" and claiming that scientists were "busted" of having "manipulated the data."

=== Health care ===
Cain favored allowing the free market to play the largest role in health care.

Cain supported the 2012 Ryan budget plan, which sought to privatize Medicare, describing it favorably as a "voucher program."

=== Immigration ===
Cain believed illegal immigrants should be able to go through the traditional citizenship process but opposed what he had described as a sense of automatic "entitlement" by people here illegally. Cain was quoted as saying, "America can be a nation with high fences and wide open doors."

Cain had said he would favor erecting an electric fence on the United States – Mexico border, saying "It's going to be 20 feet high. It's going to have barbed wire on the top. It's going to be electrified. And there's going to be a sign on the other side saying, 'It will kill you — Warning.'" He later indicated his statement was an exaggeration as a joke.

Cain supported a constitutional amendment stating that children born to illegal immigrants in the U.S. are not U.S. citizens. Cain had also said he does not support changing the Fourteenth Amendment, which states that all persons born in the U.S. and subject to the jurisdiction thereof are citizens of the United States.

=== Occupy Wall Street ===
In October 2011, Cain described the Occupy Wall Street movement as "un-American". He further stated, "I don't have facts to back this up, but I happen to believe that these demonstrations are planned and orchestrated to distract from the failed policies of the Obama administration. Don't blame Wall Street, don't blame the big banks, if you don't have a job and you're not rich, blame yourself." In response, fellow Republican candidate Buddy Roemer defended the protests.

=== Second Amendment ===
Cain believed that any concealed carry law must be dealt with at the state level and that states have the right to control gun rights.

=== Supreme Court justices ===
Cain had expressed support for Justices Antonin Scalia and Clarence Thomas.

=== Sexual harassment legislation ===
In the early 1990s, following the Clarence Thomas hearings, Cain as the then-CEO of Godfather's Pizza expressed concern about laws making it easier for women to sue their supervisors for sexual harassment: "This bill opens the door for opportunists who will use the legislation to make some money. ... I'm certainly for civil rights, but I don't know if this bill is fair because of what we'll have to spend to defend ourselves in unwarranted cases."
