= Maafa 21 =

2009 film by Mark Crutcher

- Directed by: Mark Crutcher
- Produced by: Life Dynamics
- Release date: June 15, 2009
- Running time: 137 minutes
- Country: United States

Maafa 21: Black Genocide in 21st Century America is an anti-abortion documentary film produced by white anti-abortion activist Mark Crutcher in 2009. The film, which has been enthusiastically received by anti-abortion activists, argues that the modern-day prevalence of abortion among African Americans is rooted in an attempted genocide or the maafa of black people. The film is part of an anti-abortion, anti-birth control campaign aimed at African Americans.

The film repeats elements of an American conspiracy theory called black genocide, using many of the same arguments previously used by the Black Panther Party and the Nation of Islam in the early 1970s. It uses questionable statistics and facts to induce in the viewer a fear of birth control and abortion. The film alleges that the eugenics movement targeted African Americans in the 19th and 20th centuries, that this was the basis for the creation of the American Birth Control League (now Planned Parenthood) by Margaret Sanger, and that this kind of race genocide continued in the form of the abortion-rights movement of the 20th and 21st centuries. The film puts forward the idea that Sanger was a racist who worked to reduce the population of blacks, and that Planned Parenthood is continuing this program. Sanger is accused of being an ally of Nazism and Adolf Hitler.

Critics have countered many of the film's points, arguing that Sanger was not a racist, that the eugenics movement was not especially focused on African Americans, that black women were largely in favor of birth control and were having abortions long before it became legal, and that instead of being a plot by Planned Parenthood, the high rate of abortion among African Americans comes from a correspondingly high rate of unplanned pregnancies. Esther Katz, director of NYU's Margaret Sanger Papers Project, has stated that the film presents a false depiction of Sanger's views and works.

== Synopsis ==
The title comes from the Swahili term "maafa," which translates to tragedy or disaster and is used to describe the centuries of global oppression of African people during slavery, apartheid and colonial rule, while the number "21" refers to an alleged maafa in the 21st century (even though it began in the 19th), which the film says is the disproportionately high rate of abortion among African Americans. The film presents a continual stream of assertions rather than a narrative, leaving viewers with impressions rather than a causal argument: that Sanger was racist, that she wanted to wipe out the black race, and that she set in place a program to make this happen which is being continued in the 21st century by Planned Parenthood. A photo of Adolf Hitler appears in the film, presented as one of Sanger's "natural allies", and aborted babies are compared to Holocaust victims. The film states that abortion has reduced the black population in the United States by 25 percent. It discusses some of Planned Parenthood's origins (formerly the American Birth Control League), attributing to it a "150-year-old goal of exterminating the black population." The film features conservative African Americans, including politician Stephen Broden, and Martin Luther King Jr.'s niece Alveda King, who claims that Sanger targeted black people.

== Release and screenings ==
The film was released on June 15, 2009, and the premiere screening was held on June 18, 2009, on the eve of Juneteenth, at the United States Capitol Visitor Center.

== Reception ==
Anti-abortion reviewers have generally embraced the film, while other reviewers have often criticized its attribution of racist views to family planning activists and its claims that attempt to link family planning to genocide.

Anti-abortion activists in Knoxville, Tennessee have praised the film as a "valuable tool for discourse" against abortion. MovieGuide, an online database of movie reviews that uses a "Biblical perspective" in reviewing films for families, gave Maafa 21 a "quality rating" of "excellent" (4 out of 4 stars), describing it as a "very carefully reasoned, well-produced exposé of the abortion industry, racism and eugenics" and says that it "proves through innumerable sources that the founders of Planned Parenthood and other parts of the abortion movement were interested in killing off the black race in America and elsewhere." Religious online news source Catholic.net also found Maafa 21 convincing, saying it "shows the connection from slavery and eugenics to birth control, abortion and black genocide today."

Loretta J. Ross, author of "African-American Women and Abortion: A Neglected History" and founder of several human rights and reproductive justice organizations, wrote that Maafa 21 is a "pseudo-documentary" by white anti-abortion activists, and that, rather than being racial suicide, family planning formed part of a "racial uplift strategy" supported by African-American leaders and black women, as they believed that in smaller families, each child could have a better opportunity.

Marcy Darnovsky, associate executive director of the Center for Genetics and Society, wrote that the film is a "shockumentary" used to support the activities of the black anti-abortion movement.

The Liberator Magazine, an independent magazine about African diasporic culture, gave the film a mixed review. The reviewer said that the film "does a good job of placing the Eugenics movement into a larger historical context" but that "one gets the impression that the point [of the film] isn't so much about saving black people, but furthering a political agenda" against abortion, using emotional manipulation to do so. A similar response came from Harold Middlebrook, pastor at Canaan Baptist Church of East Knoxville and "a widely respected civil-rights leader." While rejecting the idea that Maafa 21 will have a lasting impact on African American culture, largely due to his apprehensions of the sincerity of the film's producers, Middlebrook said that he "believes the theory that Planned Parenthood may be attempting to limit black births to increase white dominance."

== Rebuttals ==
Critics of the film have countered many of the film's points. Political columnist and abortion rights advocate Michelle Goldberg notes that there were racist people on both sides of the eugenics debate in the early 20th century and that Sanger wanted birth control and sterilization to be made available to anybody who wished to have it, without regard to race. She says that many African Americans, especially women, were in favor of birth control being made more available to them, and that black women had been inducing their own abortions from the earliest days of American slavery. She also notes that Martin Luther King Jr. praised Margaret Sanger in accepting an award from Planned Parenthood.

It is true that a higher percentage of African American women have abortions–about 40% of the pregnancies of black women end as induced abortion. Using data from 2009, black women had 477 abortions for every 1,000 live births, while Hispanics had 195 abortions per 1,000 live births, and whites had 140 abortions per 1,000 live births. Critics have pointed to statistics suggesting that this much higher rate of abortion among African Americans comes from a high rate of unplanned pregnancies, which is in turn caused by very poor access to birth control among blacks. The film asserts that Planned Parenthood targets black neighborhoods, but Planned Parenthood has said that only 5.8% of its clinics are in communities that have a majority of African American residents.

Esther Katz, editor and director of the Margaret Sanger Papers Project (MSPP) at New York University, said that quotes and actions attributed to Sanger are taken out of context in order to claim that she had a racist agenda. Katz said that Sanger "certainly didn't want to wipe out the black race", and that it is "stupid" to argue otherwise. Katz acknowledges that Sanger "made mistakes" in her campaign for birth control and that debating her role in the eugenics movement would be "reasonable". The online blog for the MSPP which Katz edits describes the film as "propaganda."

The eugenics movement in the US targeted African Americans but, according to critics, the film falsely implies that this was Sanger's main thrust in supporting it. Instead, Sanger and other American eugenicists made a greater effort to limit the populations of Asian immigrants, Mexican immigrants, and Mexican Americans.
