= Impact of the COVID-19 pandemic on the African diaspora =

The COVID-19 pandemic has revealed race-based health care disparities in many countries, including the United States, United Kingdom, Norway, Sweden, Canada, and Singapore. These disparities are believed to originate from structural racism in these countries which pre-dates the pandemic; a commentary in The BMJ noted that "ethnoracialised differences in health outcomes have become the new normal across the world" as a result of ethnic and racial disparities in COVID-19 healthcare, determined by social factors. Data from the United States and elsewhere shows that minorities, especially people of African descent, have been infected and killed at a disproportionate rate to people of European descent.

Research in the UK has also demonstrated how other structural issues have intersected with COVID-19 to create a damaging cycle affecting black and minority ethnic (BAME) populations. Some categories of key workers are disproportionally drawn from BAME communities and were therefore required to continue working outside their homes during the pandemic, where they were more likely to be stopped by police on their way to provide essential services. Not being eligible for furlough or work from home, key workers were also less able to provide support to home-school their children, while fear of the police deterred BAME people from leaving their homes for legitimate exercise, and those that did faced the risk of receiving a Fixed Penalty Notice and a criminal record.

== United States ==
Data from different social identities (such as class, gender, age, and medical history) shows that minorities have been disproportionally affected by the pandemic, including racial minorities. In the US, African-Americans experience the second-highest current COVID-19 mortality and morbidity rates in the country–more than twice the rate of white and Asian Americans, who have the lowest current rates.

Many studies and socioeconomic observations have demonstrated that the African-American community was disproportionately impacted by the disease in multiple ways. For instance, in cities like Chicago, although African-Americans are only 30% of the population, they comprise more than 50% of COVID-19 cases and about 70% of COVID-19 deaths.

Racial disparities between African-Americans and other racial groups have been growing since the beginning of the pandemic, in areas related to health, jobs, prison, education, psychology, mental health and housing.

=== Sectors ===
According to Maritza Vasquez Reyes in Health and Human Rights, given that the COVID-19 pandemic is more than just a health crisis—it is disrupting and affecting every aspect of life including family life, education, finances, and agricultural production—it requires a multi-sectoral approach.

According to the World Health Organization's report Closing the Gap in a Generation: Health Equity through Action on the Social Determinants of Health, "poor and unequal living conditions are the consequences of deeper structural conditions that together fashion the way societies are organized—poor social policies and programs, unfair economic arrangements, and bad politics".

The combination of structural factors as they play out during this time of crisis is disproportionately affecting African-American communities in the United States in many aspects of their life.

=== Pre-existing conditions ===
African-American people are more likely to have diseases such as hypertension, heart disease, and diabetes, conditions that amplify the severity of COVID-19 than that of white Americans, which is lower, except for lymphoma. Research has shown that not only do people of African descent develop these diseases at a greater rate than white people, they also tend to develop them at a younger age. Medical experts attribute the disproportionate rates of these diseases in people of African descent to higher levels of stress and racial discrimination.

Additionally, many people of African descent live with people who are at high risk for developing serious illness from the COVID-19 because of their age or underlying medical conditions.

=== Health ===
African-American people experience the highest COVID-19 mortality rates nationwide since the beginning of the pandemic; their mortality rate is twice as high as the rate for white Americans.

This statistic varies from state to state. For instance in Kansas, people of African descent are seven times more likely to have died than white residents, while in Washington, D.C., the rate among people of African descent is six times as high as for white people. In Missouri and Wisconsin, it is five times greater. Black people are 13% of the U.S. population that has released COVID-19 mortality data, but they account for 25% of the deaths. South Carolina and Michigan had the largest gaps — 25 points — between the percentage of black people in the population and the percentage of COVID-19 victims who were black, Virginia and North Carolina had the smallest gaps: three points.

This disproportionate impact can be explained by the racial inequalities in health insurance in the United States. For instance, according to the Kaiser Family Foundation, in 2018, 11.7% of African-American people in the United States had no health insurance, compared to 7.5% of white people. African-American communities have access to diminished health care and finances as the uninsured are far more likely than the insured to forgo needed medical visits, tests, treatments, and medications because of cost.

As the COVID-19 virus made its way throughout the United States, testing kits were distributed equally among labs across the 50 states, without consideration of population density or actual needs for testing in those states. Although there is a dearth of race-disaggregated data on the number of people tested, the data that are available highlight the overall lack of access to testing for African-American people. For example, in Kansas, as of June 27, according to the COVID Racial Data Tracker, out of 94,780 tests, only 4,854 were from African Americans and 50,070 were from white people. However, people of African descent make up almost a third of the state's COVID-19 deaths (59 of 208). And while in Illinois the total numbers of confirmed cases among African and European people were almost even, the test numbers show a different picture: 220,968 white people were tested, compared to only 78,650 Africans.

Similarly, American Public Media reported on the COVID-19 mortality rate by race/ethnicity through July 21, 2020, including Washington, DC, and 45 states. These data, while showing an alarming death rate for all races, demonstrate how minorities in the US are impacted harder by the pandemic.

The overrepresentation of African-American people among confirmed COVID-19 cases and the number of deaths underscores the fact that the coronavirus pandemic is amplifying and exacerbating existing social inequalities tied to race, class, and access to the health care system according to many statistical studies.

=== Prison ===
Nearly 2.2 million people are in US jails and prisons, the highest rate in the world. According to the US Bureau of Justice, in 2018, the imprisonment rate among African-American men was 5.8 times that of white men, while the imprisonment rate among African-American women was 1.8 times the rate among European-American women. This overrepresentation of African-American people in US jails and prisons is another indicator of the social and economic inequality affecting this population.

According to the Committee on Economic, Social and Cultural Rights' General Comment 14, "states have an obligation to ensure medical care for prisoners at least equivalent to that available to the general population."

However, there has been a very limited response to preventing transmission of the virus within detention facilities, which cannot achieve the physical distancing needed to effectively prevent the spread of COVID-19.

=== Low-wage jobs ===
Around the country, black people make up a higher proportion of some low-paid professions that have elevated risks of virus exposure.

The types of work where people in some racial and ethnic groups are overrepresented can also contribute to their risk of getting sick with COVID-19.

Nearly 40% of African-American workers, more than seven million, are low-wage workers and have jobs that deny them even a single paid sick day. Workers without paid sick leave might be more likely to continue to work even when they are sick. This can increase workers' exposure to other workers who may be infected with the COVID-19 virus.

Similarly, the Centers for Disease Control has noted that many African-American people who hold low-wage but essential jobs (such as food service, public transit, and health care) are required to continue to interact with the public, despite outbreaks in their communities, which exposes them to higher risks of COVID-19 infection. According to the Centers for Disease Control, nearly a quarter of employed Hispanic and black or African-American workers are employed in service industry jobs, compared to 16% of non-Hispanic white people. Black people make up 12% of all employed workers but account for 30% of licensed practical and licensed vocational nurses, who face significant exposure to the coronavirus.

In 2018, 45% of low-wage workers relied on an employer for health insurance. This situation forces low-wage workers to continue to go to work even when they are not feeling well. Some employers allow their workers to be absent only when they test positive for COVID-19. Given the way the virus spreads, by the time a person knows they are infected, they have likely already infected many others in close contact with them both at home and at work.

=== Homing ===
Staying home is not an option for the homeless. African-American people, despite making up just 13% of the US population, account for about 40% of the nation's homeless population, according to the Annual Homeless Assessment Report to Congress. Given that people experiencing homelessness often live in close quarters, have compromised immune systems, and are aging, they are more vulnerable to communicable diseases—including the COVID-19.

Segregation affects people's access to healthy foods and green space. It can also increase excess exposure to pollution and environmental hazards, which in turn increases the risk for diabetes, heart, and kidney diseases. African-American people living in impoverished, segregated neighborhoods may live farther away from grocery stores, hospitals, and other medical facilities. Sociologist Robert Sampson writes on this disproportionate impact by stating that the coronavirus is exposing class and race-based vulnerabilities. He says that African Americans, even if they are at the same level of income or poverty as white or Latino Americans, are much more likely to live in neighborhoods that have concentrated poverty, polluted environments, lead exposure, higher rates of incarceration, and higher rates of violence. Many of these factors lead to long-term health consequences.

The pandemic is concentrating in urban areas with high population density, which are, for the most part, neighborhoods where marginalized and minority individuals live. Strategies most recommended controlling the spread of COVID-19—social distancing and frequent handwashing—are difficult to practice for those who are incarcerated or who live in highly dense communities with precarious or insecure housing, poor sanitation, and limited access to clean water.

=== Household finances ===
Pre-pandemic, African-American people had the highest unemployment rates in the country. African-American households earned 59 cents for every dollar white households earned. For every dollar of personal savings that white households have, black households have 10 cents. Black job losses and reduced work hours have been as high as twice that of white people. Black households reported that their personal savings were depleted by the pandemic, that they had fallen behind on housing payments, or have had problems paying debts and/or utility bills.

Federal support for families from the CARES Act has expired and Congress continues to debate the funding many families desperately need. Black people and Latinos were hit especially hard when stay at home orders and social distancing mandates were enforced because they are over-represented in the leisure and hospitality industries.

== Caribbean countries ==
Although many Caribbean countries have established physical isolation measures to reduce infection and prevent health systems from collapsing, the region's structural problems have made it more complex to mount an immediate response to the crisis. A report from the Economic Commission for Latin America and the Caribbean (ECLAC) demonstrated that COVID-19 is exposing social inequalities of all kinds and the overrepresentation of Afrodescendants among the group living in poverty who are employed in informal and caregiving jobs.

As Afrodescendants have worse indicators of well-being than their non-Afrodescendant peers, they are seen as one of the groups most vulnerable to the COVID-19 pandemic in the Caribbean countries, in terms of both infection and mortality.

Various agencies and institutions, including the Pan American Health Organization, the United Nations Population Fund, the Office of the United Nations High Commissioner for Human Rights and the Inter-American Development Bank, have already pointed out that the Afrodescendant population is more vulnerable to COVID-19 owing to the structural inequality and racial discrimination to which it is subjected.

These institutions highlighted the importance of addressing health from a comprehensive perspective that considers emotional, physical and social well-being, as defined by the World Health Organization (WHO), where the relationship between health and its social determinants is taken into account. They urged countries to eliminate disparities in health status that might result from racism.

== Europe ==
=== France ===
An INSEE study shows that the excess mortality from all causes is, for March and April 2020, twice as high among people born abroad in France.

In 2020, excess of mortality primarily affected people born abroad: increase in deaths increased by 36% for people born in Africa outside the Maghreb, by 29% in Asia and by 21% in the Maghreb, while the increase in deaths of people from Europe, Oceania and America has been similar to that of people born in France.

In France, people of foreign origin have held more positions, so-called "essential" occupations, and have had to continue to go to work during the lockdown. In addition, people from sub-Saharan Africa live in the most cramped housing, which can promote transmission, especially between different age groups.

=== United Kingdom ===
In April 2020, the British Medical Association called on the government to investigate if and why people from black, Asian and minority ethnic (BAME) groups were more vulnerable to COVID-19, after the first 10 doctors to die were all from the group. The Labour Party called for a public enquiry after the first 10 deaths in the health service were from BAME backgrounds. The Mayor of London Sadiq Khan wrote to the Equality and Human Rights Commission asking them to investigate whether the effects of coronavirus on BAME groups could have been prevented or mitigated. A group of 70 BAME figures sent a letter to Boris Johnson calling for an independent public enquiry into the disproportionate impact of the coronavirus on people from black, Asian and minority ethnic backgrounds.

Research by the Intensive Care National Audit and Research Centre concluded that people from BAME backgrounds made up 34% of critical patients. NHS England and Public Health England were appointed to lead an inquiry into why people from black and minority ethnic backgrounds appear to be disproportionately affected by coronavirus. On 18 April, Public Health England said that they would start recording the ethnicity of victims of coronavirus.

Research carried out by The Guardian newspaper concluded that ethnic minorities in England when compared to white people were dying in disproportionately high numbers. They said that deaths in hospitals up to 19 April 19% were from BAME backgrounds who make up only 15% of the population of England.

The Office for National Statistics (ONS), meanwhile, wrote that in England and Wales black men were four times more likely to die from coronavirus than white men, from figures gathered between 2 March to 10 April. They concluded that "the difference between ethnic groups in COVID-19 mortality is partly a result of socio-economic disadvantage and other circumstances, but a remaining part of the difference has not yet been explained". Some commentators including Dr. John Campbell have pointed to Vitamin D deficiency as a possible cause of the discrepancy, but the theory remains unproven.

Another study carried out by University of Oxford and the London School of Hygiene and Tropical Medicine on behalf of NHS England and a separate report by the Institute for Fiscal Studies corroborated the ONS' findings. An Oxford University led study into the impact of COVID-19 on pregnancy concluded that 55% of pregnant women admitted to hospital with coronavirus from 1 March to 14 April were from a BAME background. The study also concluded that BAME women were four times more likely to be hospitalised than white women.

A study by Public Health Scotland found no link between BAME groups and COVID-19. A second Public Health England study found that those with a Bangladeshi heritage were dying at twice the rate of white Britons. Other BAME groups had between 10% and 50% higher risk of death from COVID-19.

Public Health England continued to report quarterly on the progress of its research. In its final December 2021 report it concluded that (a) the main factors behind the higher risk of COVID-19 infection for ethnic minority groups were occupation, living in multigenerational households, and living in densely populated urban areas with poor air quality and higher levels of deprivation; (b) once infected, the risk of dying was higher for older people, males, people with disabilities, and people with other health conditions such as diabetes, and (c) a gene carried by 61% of people with South Asian ancestry doubled the risk of respiratory failure following COVID-19 infection.

As the vaccine programme gathered pace, it became clear that the level of take-up varied significantly between different ethnic groups. Notably, those identifying as Black or Black British reported the highest level of vaccine hesitancy, at over 40%.

=== European Commission ===
COVID-19 has shown the impact on black and Asian people in Europe.

The Council of Europe's anti-racism commission (ECRI) in its 2020 annual report published in March 2021, ahead of the International Day against Racial Discrimination marked on 21 March, identified four key challenges Europe was facing last year. These are:

- mitigating the disproportional impact of the COVID-19 pandemic on vulnerable groups,
- tackling deep-rooted racism in public life,
- combating anti-Muslim racism and antisemitism in the face of terrorism,
- addressing the backlash against the protection of the human rights of LGBTQI people.

Even if many European countries avoid breaking down data along racial or ethnic lines out of concern over privacy or discrimination, COVID-19 data shows well ethnic inequalities in healthcare access.

== See also ==
- COVID-19 pandemic by country and territory
- COVID-19 misinformation
