= Dara Abubakari =

Dara Abubakari (born Virginia Evalena Young, 1915–2011) was an activist and advocate for Pan-African organizing and black nation-building. She was an important member of a number of organizations, including the Universal Negro Improvement Association, the Communist Party, and the Universal Association of Ethiopian Women. In later decades, she emerged as a key leader in groups such as the Republic of New Africa and the Revolutionary Action Movement. Through her guidance, these organizations helped inspire and influence the next generation of activists with their Pan-African political vision and dedication to activism.

== Early life, family, and education ==
Born in 1915 in Plaquemines Parish, Dara Abubakari entered the world as Virginia Young. She was the oldest of fifteen children, and her mother was a missionary while her father was an insurance salesman and a well-known local preacher. Both of her parents were members of the National Association for the Advancement of Colored People (NAACP), and they worked to integrate schools and other institutions throughout the United States.

After finishing high school, Dara Abubakari went on to attend the Nelson School of Nursing. Subsequently, she pursued two careers and worked as both a schoolteacher and a private nurse. Dara Abubakari began to work with the NAACP and the Urban League during her adolescent years. She married James Collins Sr., a teacher.

== Activism ==
Abubakari was a member of the Sons and Daughters of Ethiopia, an auxiliary that New Orleans members created to coordinate the division's relief program in the 1930s. She also joined other organizations designed to support poor and working-class African Americans, like the Southern Conference for Human Welfare (SCHW) and Southern Conference Educational Fund (SCEF). In 1938, Young joined the SCHW. The organization was "in the forefront of social change" and Abubakari was inspired by its work. She worked within the group, organizing forums to discuss voter rights and equal education in New Orleans. She would remain a member of the organization for the next forty years, becoming its vice-president in 1972.

Abubakari acted in the defense of the Scottsboro Boys, five young Black men who were framed for the supposed rape of two White women on a southern freight train in the 1930s. Abubakari was involved in many court cases concerning injustices against black people for many years. She was recognized by Amnesty International.

Abubakari helped organize the New Orleans Public Education Association in the late 1950s and later became head of Citizens for Quality Education, an organization fighting for improved public school education. Abubakari also served as an assistant to the Executive Director of the Southern Conference Education Fund (SCEF), a southern-based organization that aided education for people of different races. Abubakari was also on the Board of Directors of SCEF as both a Vice President and President.

In 1978, Abubakari was elected the third President of the Republic of New Afrika.

== See also ==
- Queen Mother Moore

== Sources ==
- Farmer, Ashley D. (2016-10-01). "Mothers of Pan-Africanism: Audley Moore and Dara Abubakari". Women, Gender, and Families of Color. 4 (2): 274–295. doi:10.5406/womgenfamcol.4.2.0274. ISSN 2326-0939. *"Evolution of the role of African women". La Svolta (in Italian). Retrieved 2023-02-17.
- Mary (2012-02-16). "Who are you?". San Francisco Bay View. Retrieved 2023-02-17.
- "Tracking Activists: The FBI's Surveillance of Black Women Activists Then and Now". www.oah.org. Retrieved 2023-02-17.
- "Black Power Encyclopedia: From "Black is Beautiful" to Urban Uprisings [2 volumes] page xx". publisher.abc-clio.com. Retrieved 2023-02-17.
- "Prov. Gov. of Rep. of New Afrika v. Amer. Broadcast., 609 F. Supp. 104 (D.D.C. 1985)". Justia Law. Retrieved 2023-02-17.
- Blain, Keisha N. (2018). "To Keep Alive the Teaching of Garvey and the Work of the UNIA": Audley Moore, Black Women's Activism, and Nationalist Politics during the Twentieth Century". Palimpsest: A Journal on Women, Gender, and the Black International. 7 (2): 83–107. doi:10.1353/pal.2018.0018. ISSN 2165-1612
- Lamont, Michèle (1999-05-15). The Cultural Territories of Race: Black and White Boundaries. University of Chicago Press. ISBN 978-0-226-46836-5
