= Life Dynamics Inc. =

Anti-abortion organization

- Formation: 1992
- Founder: Mark Crutcher
- Type: Anti-abortion activism
- Headquarters: Denton, Texas
- Location: United States
- Official language: English

Life Dynamics Inc. (LDI) is an anti-abortion organization founded by Marcus "Mark" Crutcher III in 1992. It is headquartered in Denton, Texas.

== Company profile ==
Planned Parenthood lists LDI on its "Profiles of 15 Anti-Choice Organizations". PPFA says that LDI is opposed to abortion, as well as research using fetal tissue or embryonic stem cells.

In founding Life Dynamics, Crutcher said that he wanted to fill the gaps left by other organizations. One shortcoming he noticed was in what he called "professional counter-intelligence or intelligence-gathering". Thus, Crutcher focuses his organization's efforts on operations involving gathering new data on abortion facilities and organizations which support abortion rights.

LDI is endorsed by Alan Keyes, who referred to LDI as "a cutting edge approach to spreading the message of the pro-life movement"; Joseph Scheidler of Pro-Life Action League, who says, "I appreciate everything Life Dynamics does"; Judy Brown of American Life League, who praised LDI for aggressiveness and accuracy; Dr. Jack Willke of Life Institute and International Right to Life Federation, who calls LDI "a spear carrier"; and Father Frank Pavone of Priests for Life, who appears regularly on LDI's LifeTalk program.

Dr. Warren Hern, an abortion provider in Boulder, Colorado, has said that "we cannot underestimate the determination of Life Dynamics to destroy us". Crutcher died in 2023.

== Ongoing activities ==
LDI operates a number of simultaneous projects, often with a separate web site targeting that aspect of the group's work.

- ClinicWorker.com: LDI encourages anti-abortion activists who congregate at abortion facilities to promote ClinicWorker.com, a site urging abortion clinic staff to report wrongdoing, such as statutory rape, income tax evasion, Medicaid fraud, health and safety risks, and insurance fraud to authorities. LDI admits that part of the goal of this project is to sow discord and strife within abortion facilities. ClinicWorker.com is promoted by many anti-abortion web sites, but unlike other LDI projects has not generated much mainstream or pro-choice attention. Vicki Saporta, Executive Director of the National Abortion Federation, called ClinicWorker.com another attempt by Crutcher to drive abortion providers out of business, and said, "His attempts at these methods have not been successful in the past, and we're not concerned about his success in the future."
- AbortionInjury.com: AbortionInjury.com offers referrals to attorneys to represent women injured by abortion.
- Abortion Malpractice Program ("Ab/Mal"): a collection of services LDI provides to attorneys representing plaintiffs filing suit against abortion providers. The services range from advertising materials for attracting clients to linking with co-counsel. Life Dynamics Inc. launched this program in 1993 by mailing a 72-page booklet on how to pursue suits against abortion providers to 4,000 attorneys in the United States, and followed up with a two-day continuing education conference for attorneys the following year. Crutcher says that the mission of the Ab/Mal program is not only to provide legal redress, but also "to force abortionists out of business by driving up their insurance rates".

== Previous projects ==
- Bottom Feeder was a 16-page cartoon tract filled with humor about abortion practitioners which LDI mailed to 30,000 medical students. Abortion rights activists criticized Bottom Feeder because of its tone, and also because it was mailed out in 1993, the same year abortion provider Dr. David Gunn was murdered. Medical Students for Choice was founded, in part, as a response to Bottom Feeder. Bottom Feeder also angered anti-abortion activists who criticized what they perceived as the "distasteful and ... pornographic" nature of the booklet.
- "Project Choice" was a survey LDI sent to abortion physicians about their experiences. The "Project Choice" survey was mailed to approximately 1,000 abortion providers, and with telephone and postcard follow-up, attained a 30% response rate.
- Maafa 21 was a 2009 documentary created by Crutcher and LDI intended to present the abortion in the United States as a tool of white supremacy, especially through eugenics, as well as the work of Margaret Sanger and Planned Parenthood.
