= Albion, Maine =

Town in Maine, United States

- Town
- Seal

- Location in Kennebec County and the state of Maine
- Coordinates: 44°30′48″N 69°26′28″W
- Country: United States
- State: Maine
- County: Kennebec
- Villages: Albion; South Albion

Area
  - Total: 39.46 sq mi (102.20 km^{2})
  - Land: 38.83 sq mi (100.57 km^{2})
  - Water: 0.63 sq mi (1.63 km^{2})
- Elevation: 417 ft (127 m)

Population (2020)
  - Total: 2,006
  - Density: 52/sq mi (19.9/km^{2})
- Time zone: UTC-5 (Eastern (EST))
  - Summer (DST): UTC-4 (EDT)
- ZIP code: 04910
- Area code: 207
- FIPS code: 23-00590
- GNIS feature ID: 582317
- Website: www.townofalbionmaine.com

Albion is a town in Kennebec County, Maine, United States. The population was 2,006 at the 2020 census.

== History ==
Albion was settled in 1790 as Freetown Plantation by Congregational minister Daniel Lovejoy, father of Presbyterian minister Elijah Parish Lovejoy. It was incorporated as the Town of Fairfax on March 9, 1804. It annexed land from Winslow in 1810, and gave up segments of land in 1813, 1816, and 1818 that would eventually become China. The town's name was changed to Ligonia on March 10, 1821, and then to Albion on February 25, 1824.

== Geography ==
According to the United States Census Bureau, the town has a total area of 39.46 square miles (102.20 km^{2}), of which 38.83 square miles (100.57 km^{2}) is land and 0.63 square miles (1.63 km^{2}) is water, chiefly Lovejoy Pond (379 acres).

Albion is served by U.S. Route 202, Maine State Routes 9 and 137. It is bordered on the northwest by Benton, on the north by Unity Township, on the northeast by Unity, on the east by Freedom, on the south by China and Palermo and on the west by Winslow.

== Demographics ==
Historical population
Census	Pop.	Note	%±
1810	924		—
1820	1,204		30.3%
1830	1,393		15.7%
1840	1,624		16.6%
1850	1,604		−1.2%
1860	1,554		−3.1%
1870	1,356		−12.7%
1880	1,191		−12.2%
1890	1,042		−12.5%
1900	878		−15.7%
1910	922		5.0%
1920	900		−2.4%
1930	923		2.6%
1940	974		5.5%
1950	992		1.8%
1960	974		−1.8%
1970	1,056		8.4%
1980	1,551		46.9%
1990	1,736		11.9%
2000	1,946		12.1%
2010	2,041		4.9%
2020	2,006		−1.7%
U.S. Decennial Census

=== 2010 census ===
As of the census of 2010, there were 2,041 people, 819 households, and 568 families living in the town. The population density was 52.6 inhabitants per square mile (20.3/km^{2}). There were 923 housing units at an average density of 23.8 per square mile (9.2/km^{2}). The racial makeup of the town was 97.8% White, 0.4% African American, 0.3% Native American, 0.4% Asian, 0.1% Pacific Islander, 0.2% from other races, and 0.7% from two or more races. Hispanic or Latino of any race were 0.3% of the population.

There were 819 households, of which 30.9% had children under the age of 18 living with them, 54.0% were married couples living together, 8.5% had a female householder with no husband present, 6.8% had a male householder with no wife present, and 30.6% were non-families. 23.7% of all households were made up of individuals, and 11.1% had someone living alone who was 65 years of age or older. The average household size was 2.49 and the average family size was 2.91.

The median age in the town was 42.6 years. 23.5% of residents were under the age of 18; 6.8% were between the ages of 18 and 24; 24% were from 25 to 44; 31.3% were from 45 to 64; and 14.6% were 65 years of age or older. The gender makeup of the town was 49.5% male and 50.5% female.

=== 2000 census ===
As of the census of 2000, there were 1,946 people, 719 households, and 545 families living in the town. The population density was 50.1 inhabitants per square mile (19.3/km^{2}). There were 805 housing units at an average density of 20.7 per square mile (8.0/km^{2}). The racial makeup of the town was 98.56% White, 0.05% African American, 0.15% Native American, 0.57% Asian, 0.05% from other races, and 0.62% from two or more races. Hispanic or Latino of any race were 0.41% of the population.

There were 719 households, out of which 34.9% had children under the age of 18 living with them, 65.0% were married couples living together, 6.1% had a female householder with no husband present, and 24.2% were non-families. 18.1% of all households were made up of individuals, and 8.8% had someone living alone who was 65 years of age or older. The average household size was 2.68 and the average family size was 3.01.

In the town, the population was spread out, with 26.6% under the age of 18, 7.0% from 18 to 24, 30.2% from 25 to 44, 22.9% from 45 to 64, and 13.3% who were 65 years of age or older. The median age was 37 years. For every 100 females, there were 96.2 males. For every 100 females age 18 and over, there were 95.1 males.

The median income for a household in the town was $35,357, and the median income for a family was $37,574. Males had a median income of $30,868 versus $20,385 for females. The per capita income for the town was $15,285. About 8.9% of families and 12.0% of the population were below the poverty line, including 16.1% of those under age 18 and 3.4% of those age 65 or over.

== Notable people ==
- Edward Sturgis Ingraham, educator and mountaineer, helped establish Mount Rainier National Park
- Elijah P. Lovejoy (1802–1837), abolitionist and editor of the Alton Observer
- Owen Lovejoy (1811–1864), brother of Elijah, Congregational clergyman, abolitionist, and congressman from Illinois

== Transportation ==
Albion was the northern terminus of the Wiscasset and Quebec Railroad; a two-foot gauge railroad running north from the seaport of Wiscasset, Maine. The railroad reached Albion in November 1895, with a goal of eventually extending as far north as Quebec City. After going through bankruptcy, several new owners and a couple of name changes to the Wiscasset, Waterville and Farmington Railway, the company finally succumbed to over the road transportation and the depression in 1933.
