= Thomas Dimmock =

American journalist (1830–1909)

Thomas Dimmock (1830-1909) was an American journalist, editorial writer, book reviewer, critic and lecturer. He was responsible for restoring the Alton, Illinois, grave of free-press martyr Elijah Parish Lovejoy, who was shot and killed by a pro-slavery mob in 1837.

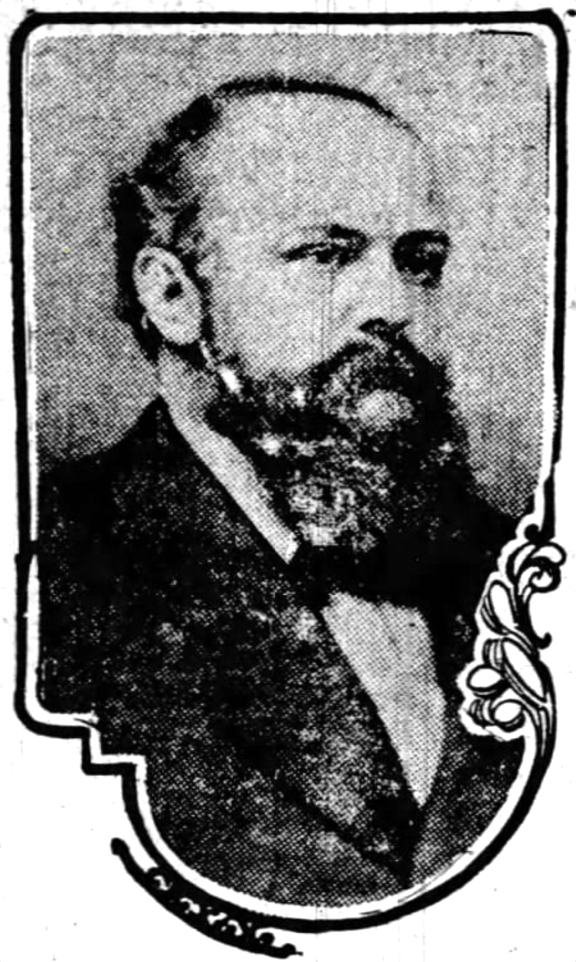
Thomas Dimmock

== Professional life ==
Dimmock was engaged in newspaper work for thirty years. He was in management of the Alton (Illinois) Democrat from April 1853 to November 1864 and then became the editor in January 1867.

He was a "staunch supporter of the Union cause and rendered much service to Abraham Lincoln by making speeches and by his writings in 1860" and after.

His last regular editorial connection was with the Missouri Republican, where he was for a time the city editor and for which he wrote editorials, book reviews, critical articles and other matter from 1869 to 1888. He then devoted himself to independent literary work and lecturing.

An obituary in the St. Louis Globe-Democrat said of him: "He was a pleasing and scholarly writer and delighted in historical subjects, especially those about which clustered some problem or mystery. He could always write something new about Lincoln because he knew him personally."

In 1891–1894, he authored a series of articles in the Post-Dispatch headed "Things Wise and Otherwise." He also wrote articles on "Dean Swift, with his two loves, 'Stella' and 'Vanessa'".

== Volunteer work ==
=== Elijah Lovejoy monument ===
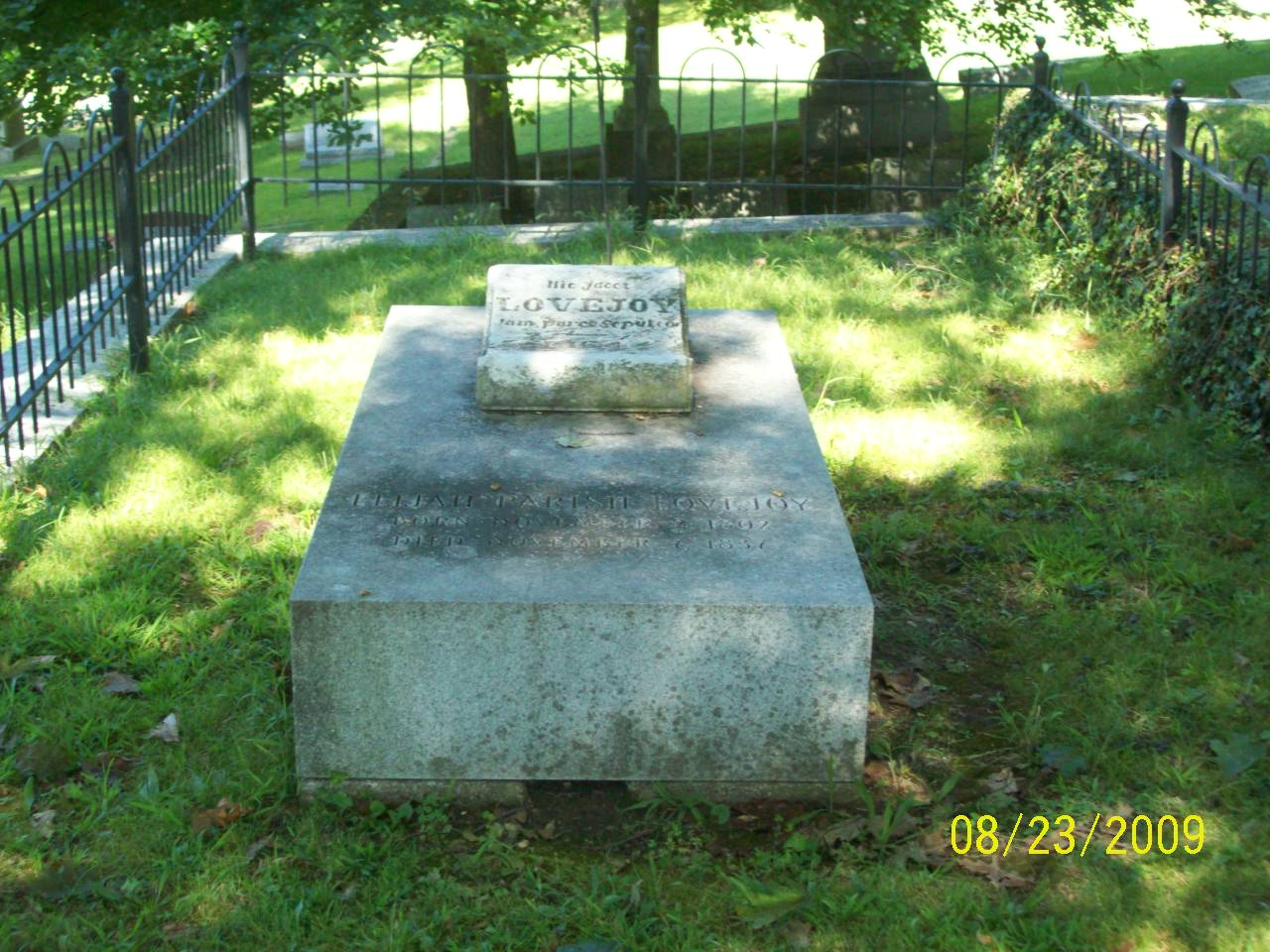
Elijah Lovejoy grave rescued by Dimmock as it was in 2003.

In 1864, Dimmock "reclaimed from oblivion" the Alton, Illinois, grave of free-press martyr Elijah Parish Lovejoy, who was shot and killed by a pro-slavery mob in 1837. Dimmock "succeeded in establishing the location of the grave . . . in a roadway where vehicles were passing over it. . . . Mr. Dimmock had the bones disinterred and . . . laid in a new grave where they would be free from trespass." He was principal orator at the dedication of a later monument erected to Lovejoy's memory.

The Chicago Tribune said of the episode:

For many years Lovejoy's grave was unmarked and in danger of utter oblivion, until one who had known him in life, Thomas Dimmock of St. Louis, . . . marked the grave with the simple stone bearing he inscription: "Hic jacet Lovejoy. Jam parce depulto." "Here lies Lovejoy: now spare his grave." It was largely through the efforts of Mr. Dimmock that ten years ago the Lovejoy Monument Association was formed . . . .

=== Other ===
Dimmock was a Democrat and in 1864 was on a slate of Illinois electors pledged to support George B. McClellan for President of the United States and George H. Pendleton for vice president.

In 1865, Dimmock and other volunteers attempted to extinguish flames in a railroad boxcar after the Alton, Illinois, fire department refused to work on it because the railroad company had furnished boxcars instead of coaches to take the firemen to Springfield, Illinois, on the occasion of Abraham Lincoln's funeral.

Dimmock was elected to the library board in Alton, but he never took his seat, and the post went vacant.

== Personal life ==
Dimmock was born as Thomas Dimmick on May 22, 1829, in Falmouth, Massachusetts, the son of Elijah L. and Sarah Dimmick. He removed with his parents in the early 1860s to Alton, Illinois, where he was educated.

He and his first wife, Maria Tilton, had a daughter, Theodosia Burr, whom they named after Theodosia Burr Alston, the daughter of Aaron Burr, whose ship on which she was sailing was lost near Cape Hatteras in a storm in 1813. Maria died in 1860.

His second wife was Caroline Garnier; they were married in St. Louis on February 6, 1873.

Dimmock died November 18, 1909, in St. John's Hospital, St. Louis. He had been comatose for three years. A funeral service was held in the home of his daughter, Mrs. Jacob Sead, on Second Street, "the old Dimmock homestead." George R. Dodson, pastor of the Church of the Unity, officiated. Dimmock was interred in the Alton City Cemetery.
