= Alton Observer =

Newspaper in Alton, Illinois

- Publisher: Elijah Lovejoy
- Editor: Elijah Lovejoy
- Founded: September 8, 1836
- Political alignment: Abolitionist
- Ceased publication: April 19, 1838
- City: Alton, Illinois
- OCLC number: 7330631

The Alton Observer (1837) was an abolitionist newspaper established in Alton, Illinois, by the journalist and newspaper editor Elijah Lovejoy after he was forced to flee St. Louis, Missouri. Lovejoy left St. Louis, where he edited the St. Louis Observer, after his printing press was destroyed for the third time.

Although Illinois was a free state and Alton was linked to the Underground Railroad, the city also had a large pro-slavery faction, including slave catchers and others dependent on slaves. The former earned money by their capture of slaves' escaping across the Mississippi from Missouri. Southern Illinois had numerous slavery supporters, where farmers used slave labor for cultivation.

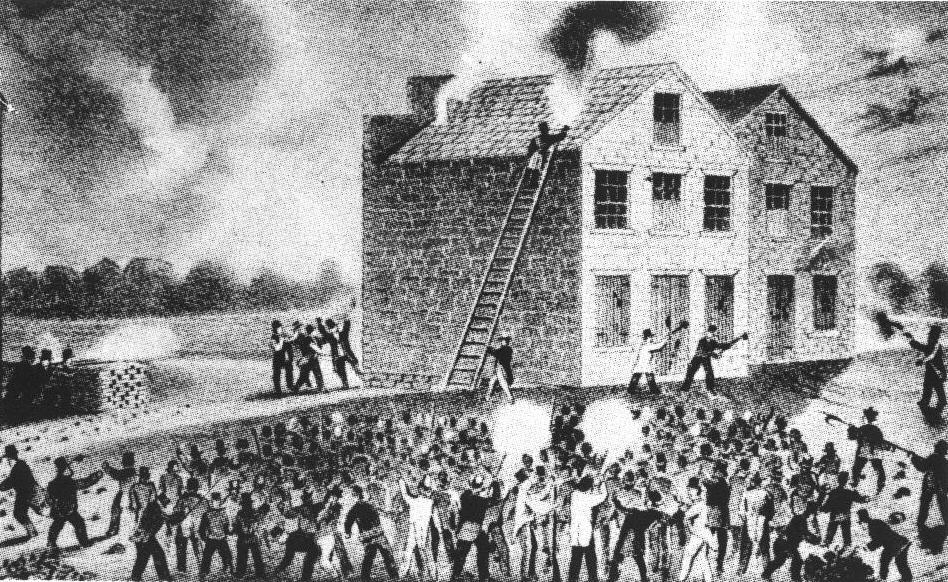
Wood engraving of the November 1837 pro-slavery riot in which Elijah Lovejoy was murdered.

On November 7, 1837, abolition opponents mobbed the warehouse where Lovejoy had his press, and gunfire was exchanged between them and his supporters. Lovejoy and his supporters killed one man in the mob, named Bishop, and wounded others. While they were trying to prevent the burning of the warehouse, Lovejoy and Royal Weller were shot; Lovejoy died immediately. The mob threw the press out the window and into the river. Publication of the Alton Observer ended after Lovejoy's murder, but his brother Owen Lovejoy became a leader of the abolitionists in Illinois and carried on the struggle. Elijah Lovejoy was considered a martyr by abolitionists across the country.

== See also ==
- Abolitionism in the United States
- Elijah P. Lovejoy Monument
- St. Louis Observer
