= John Glanville Gill =

American Unitarian minister, scholar and civil rights activist

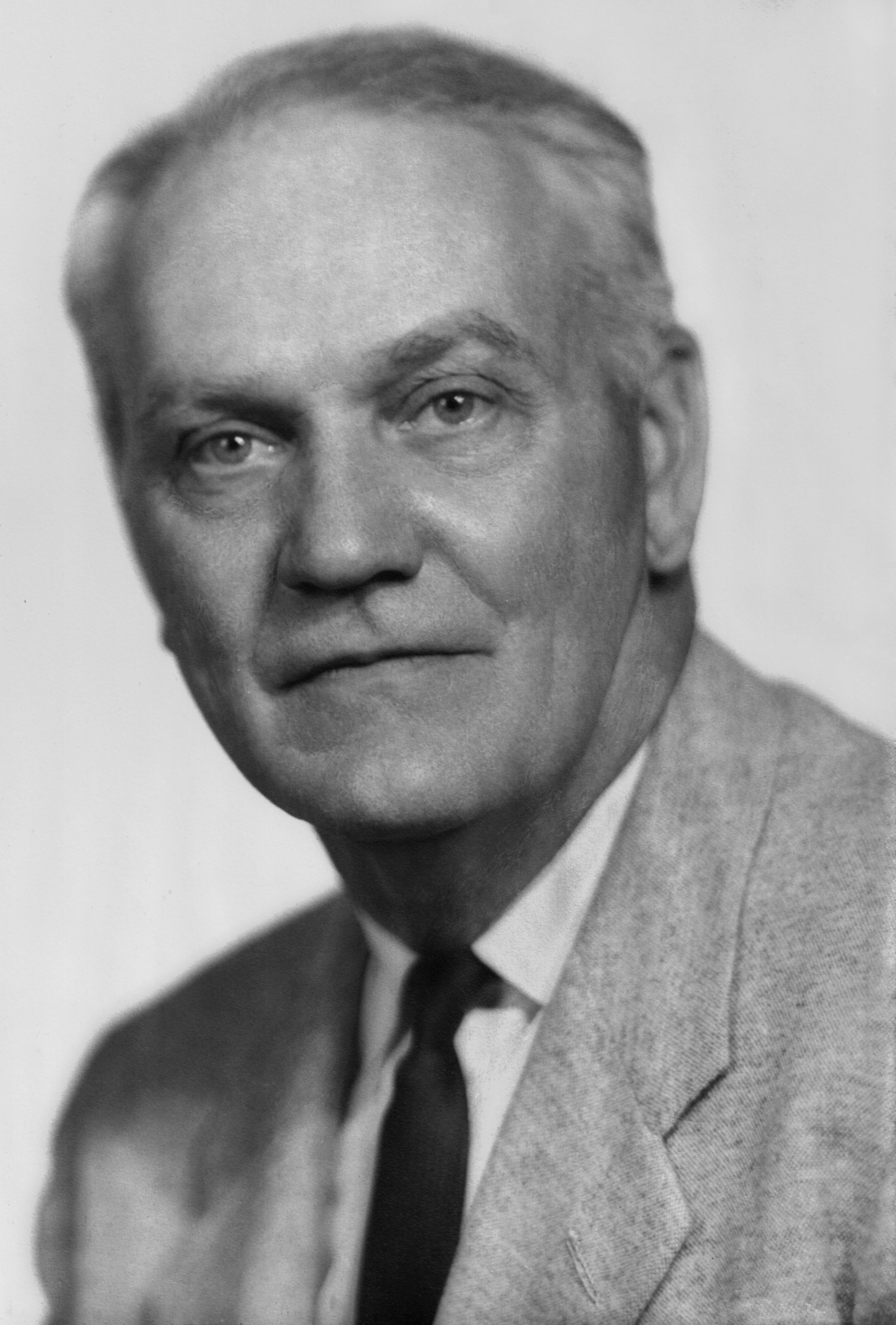
- John Glanville Gill, late 1960s
- Education: University of Wisconsin; Union Theological Seminary; Harvard University

John Glanville Gill was an American Unitarian minister, scholar in history, and civil rights activist. While working on research for his dissertation about Elijah Parish Lovejoy, an editor and abolitionist, he lived and worked in Alton, Illinois in the mid-1940s. There he worked with other ministers to try to integrate public schools, raise awareness about racial discrimination, and end segregation practices.

== Formative years ==
Born in Louisville, Kentucky, on November 22, 1909, John Glanville Gill earned a B.A. at the University of Wisconsin (where he convinced Alexander Meiklejohn to delay his departure so he could study with him in the University of Wisconsin Experimental College that Meiklejohn had founded); and an S.T.B. (Bachelor of Sacred Theology) at Union Theological Seminary in New York City, where he studied under Reinhold Niebuhr. He earned a Ph.D. in history at Harvard University, writing a dissertation on Elijah Parish Lovejoy, martyr in 1837 to abolitionism and freedom of the press.

As a scholar studying pre-Civil War history in Alton, Illinois, John Gill moved to the city in 1944. He served as minister of its First Unitarian Church and carried out research on his subject. A century earlier, Lovejoy had changed from a position as a moderate newspaper editor who wanted to "hear both sides", becoming more anti-slavery and ultimately being fatally shot in a riot to suppress his newspaper. Like Lovejoy, Gill was transformed by his experience in Alton from an academic into a civil rights activist.

== Activism in Alton ==
Like many other Illinois communities after World War II, Alton openly flouted state law by maintaining segregated public schools below the high school level. In daily life, African Americans were discriminated against in numerous ways, by de facto kinds of segregation: they had to sit in the balcony at the movie theater, they were not allowed to try on clothes at downtown stores before purchase, and they could not eat at the lunch counter of Kresge's Variety Store.

Gill found these violations unacceptable. He initiated discussion groups in an attempt to improve race relations. In 1946, Gill delivered the keynote address at the 18th annual Lincoln-Douglas Dinner held at the former Booker T. Washington Center. Gill believed that Alton's ministers could play a critical role in transforming the community. He joined the Alton Council of Churches, which sponsored an annual training institute for religious leaders at Shurtleff College. Gill served as dean of this institute in 1947.

Led by Gill, Alton's civil rights activists mounted a major challenge to Alton's segregated schools in 1950, attempting to enroll 175 African-American children at five all-white grade schools and two all-white junior high schools. Gill organized fellow ministers to help supervise the demonstration and protect the children. Local racists were enraged and staged Ku Klux Klan burnings of crosses at Salu and Riverfront parks. Gill refused to be intimidated and spoke against segregation of the public schools from his pulpit. He was one of eighteen ministers who signed a statement condemning racism that was published in The Alton Telegraph.

== Extending the legacy of Elijah Parish Lovejoy ==
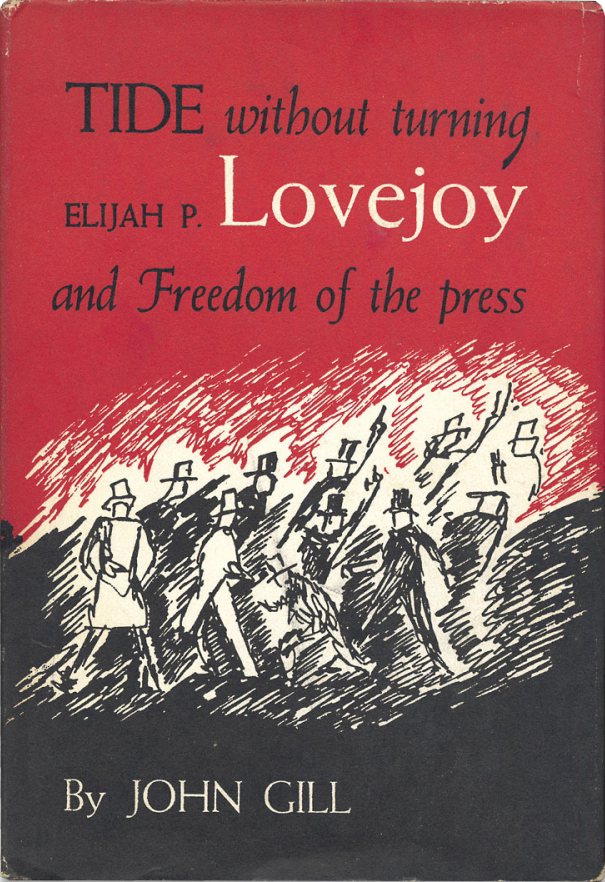
The book describing the circumstances surrounding the death of Elijah P. Lovejoy

In 1947, three years after moving to Alton, Gill earned his Ph.D. at Harvard for his thesis entitled "The Issues Involved in the Death of the Rev. Elijah P. Lovejoy, Alton, 1837." That work was developed and published as Tide Without Turning: Elijah P. Lovejoy and Freedom of the Press (1958), the first biography of Lovejoy.

Following Gill's activism and burnings staged by protesters against his efforts to integrate schools, the congregation of the First Unitarian Church in Alton decided that Gill was too controversial. A quorum met in 1950 and voted by 46 to 25 not to renew his contract as minister. Alton's desegregation struggle and Gill's dismissal were the topic of an article in the January 22, 1951, issue of Time magazine.

Nearly a half century later, Lovejoy scholar Rev. Robert Tabscott organized a Service of Recognition for Gill. It was held on February 20, 1995, at the First Unitarian Church of Alton, to offset Gill's dismissal so many years before.

In a 2008 article about Gill, The Telegraph wrote of his book, "Merton Dillon and Paul Simon wrote Lovejoy biographies in the 1960s, but Gill's Tide Without Turning: Elijah Lovejoy and Freedom of the Press remains the definitive work on the martyred newspaper editor. Only Gill who, like Lovejoy, had also endured persecution while fighting for dignity and freedom in the River Bend could have written such a book."

Gill died on October 23, 1979, in Silver Spring, Maryland.
