= Lynching of Francis McIntosh =

Murder of boatman in St. Louis (1836)

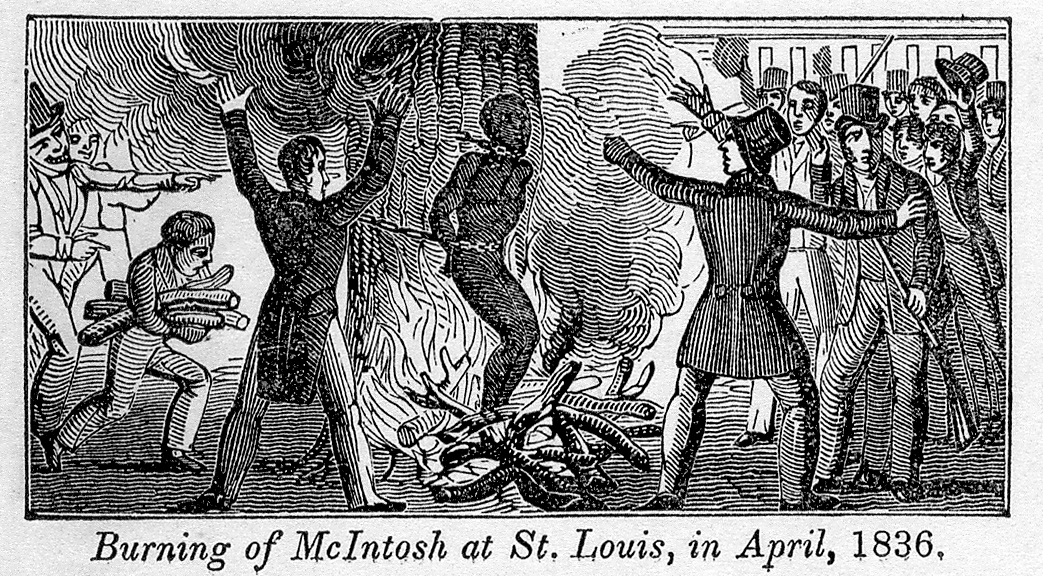
- Drawing of the burning of Francis McIntosh, from Illustrations of the American Anti-slavery Almanac for 1840
- Location: 38°37′36″N 90°11′31″W; St. Louis, Missouri, U.S.
- Date: April 28, 1836; 190 years ago
- Deaths: Francis McIntosh

The lynching of Francis McIntosh was the killing of a free Black man, a boatman, by a white mob after he was arrested in St. Louis, Missouri, United States, on April 28, 1836. He had fatally stabbed one policeman and injured a second.

== Lynching ==
Francis L. McIntosh, aged twenty-six, of Pittsburgh, Pennsylvania, was a free man of color who worked as a porter and a cook on the steamboat Flora, which arrived in St. Louis on April 28. McIntosh departed the boat in the morning to visit an African-American chambermaid who worked aboard the Lady Jackson, which had docked the same day.

According to the captain of the Flora, as McIntosh departed the boat, two police officers were chasing another sailor (who had been involved in a fight) and requested McIntosh's assistance in stopping him. McIntosh did not assist the officers, and he was arrested for interfering in the apprehension. In the second version of events, the two sailors had been drinking and had insulted the officers, and McIntosh refused to assist in arresting the pair. According to St. Louis: An Informal History of the City and Its People, Deputy Constable William Mull arrested McIntosh the afternoon of the 28th for helping two Flora deckhands escape from Mull's custody. On their way to jail, the two met George Hammond, deputy sheriff, who assisted Mull in escorting McIntosh to jail.

When charged with breach of the peace by a justice of the peace, McIntosh asked the two arresting officers how long he would have to remain in jail. After one of them replied that he would serve five years in prison for the crime, McIntosh stabbed both officers, killing one and seriously injuring the other, and tried to escape. He fled down Market Street to Walnut, scaled a garden fence, and hid in an outhouse. A man in the crowd that had gathered outside smashed in the door, knocked down McIntosh, and took his knife. The crowd took McIntosh to jail, where Sheriff James Brotherton locked him up.

A white mob soon broke into the jail and removed McIntosh. The mob took him to the outskirts of town (near the present-day intersection of Seventh and Chestnut streets in Downtown St. Louis), chained him to a locust tree, and piled wood around and up to his knees. When the mob lit the wood with a hot brand, McIntosh asked the crowd to shoot him, and began to sing hymns. When one in the crowd said that he had died, McIntosh reportedly replied, "No, no — I feel as much as any of you. Shoot me! Shoot me!" After at most twenty minutes, McIntosh died.

Estimates for the number of persons present at the lynching range in the hundreds, and include an alderman who threatened to shoot anyone who attempted to stop the killing. During the night, an elderly African-American man was paid to keep the fire lit, and the mob dispersed. The next day, on April 29, a group of boys were seen throwing rocks at McIntosh's corpse in an attempt to break his skull.

== Grand jury ==
When a grand jury was convened on May 16 to investigate the lynching, it was overseen by Judge Luke E. Lawless. Most local newspapers and the presiding judge encouraged no indictment for the crime, and no one was ever charged or convicted. Judge Lawless stated in his charge to the jury that if individuals could be found guilty, they should be prosecuted. However, he suggested no judicial action if this was a "mass phenomenon". The judge also made a racist remark in court that McIntosh's actions were an example of the "atrocities committed in this and other states by individuals of negro blood against their white brethren," and that with the rise of abolitionism, "the free negro has been converted into a deadly enemy." The judge, inaccurately, told the jury that McIntosh was a pawn of local abolitionists, particularly Elijah Lovejoy, the publisher of a known abolitionist newspaper. Many in the East and St. Louis itself condemned Judge Lawless's actions during the trial. John O'Fallon served as foreman of the jury.

== Aftermath ==
In the weeks after the lynching, several abolitionists condemned the events, including newspaper editor Elijah Lovejoy. Lovejoy ran the Presbyterian religious newspaper, St. Louis Observer. He published abolitionist, temperance, and anti-Catholic editorials. The Observer header on May 5, 1836, suggested that the lynching of McIntosh effectively ended the rule of Law and Constitution in St. Louis.

As a result of mob pressure and outright attacks on his press, Lovejoy was forced to move from St. Louis to Alton, Illinois, in the free state. But in November 1837, after he had acquired and hidden a new press, a white anti-abolition mob attacked the warehouse where it was stored. He was fatally shot and murdered in the altercation, as was a man named Bishop in the mob.

One New York abolitionist newspaper, The Emancipator, noted that "the circumstances attending the burning of a negro alive, at the West, are known.... The Spaniards may have murdered monks by the score, the Mexicans may have shot prisoners by the dozen, but roasting alive before a slow fire is a practice nowhere except among free, enlightened, high-minded Americans."

In January 1838, future President Abraham Lincoln referred to the McIntosh lynching as an example in his address at the Lyceum.

Turn, then, to that horror-striking scene at St. Louis. A single victim was only sacrificed there. His story is very short; and is, perhaps, the most highly tragic, if anything of its length, that has ever been witnessed in real life. A mulatto man, by the name of McIntosh, was seized in the street, dragged to the suburbs of the city, chained to a tree, and actually burned to death; and all within a single hour from the time he had been a freeman, attending to his own business, and at peace with the world.

— Abraham Lincoln, Address at the Lyceum, January 27, 1838

No other state legislator in Illinois or Missouri condemned the mob action. Shortly after the lynching, a St. Louis newspaper, the Missouri Republican, noted that abolitionists were attempting to gather McIntosh's remains in an effort to bring them to the Eastern United States, as a symbol of the evils of slavery. In the years following the lynching, visitors to the city (often from McIntosh's home town of Pittsburgh, Pennsylvania) went to the tree and removed parts of it as memorial keepsakes.

== See also ==
- History of St. Louis, Missouri
