= Joseph Cammett Lovejoy =

American clergyman, activist and author

Joseph Cammett Lovejoy (1805–1871) was a clergyman, activist, and author. He was an abolitionist, and was also involved in the debate over liquor laws. His siblings included Elijah Parish Lovejoy and Owen Lovejoy (1811–1864). He wrote Memoir of Charles T. Torrey about Charles T. Torrey. who died in a Maryland penitentiary after being sentenced for aiding African Americans trying to escape slavery on the Underground Railroad and co-wrote with his brother Owen the memoir of their murdered brother Elijah.

He wrote for The Emancipator. He and his brother Owen wrote a memoir of Elijah Lovejoy after his murder by a white mob for publishing an anti-slavery newspaper. In March 1853, he gave a speech before the Legislative Temperance Committee. He also spoke about liquor legislation before the Massachusetts Legislature.

== Bibliography ==
- Memoir of Rev. C. T. Torrey; who died in the Penitentiary of Maryland, where he was confined for showing mercy to the poor
- Memoir of the REV. Elijah P. Lovejoy; Who Was Murdered in Defence of the Liberty of the Press, at Alton, Illinois, Nov. 7, 1837, co-written with Owen Lovejoy
