= Abraham Lincoln's Lyceum address =

1838 speech by Abraham Lincoln

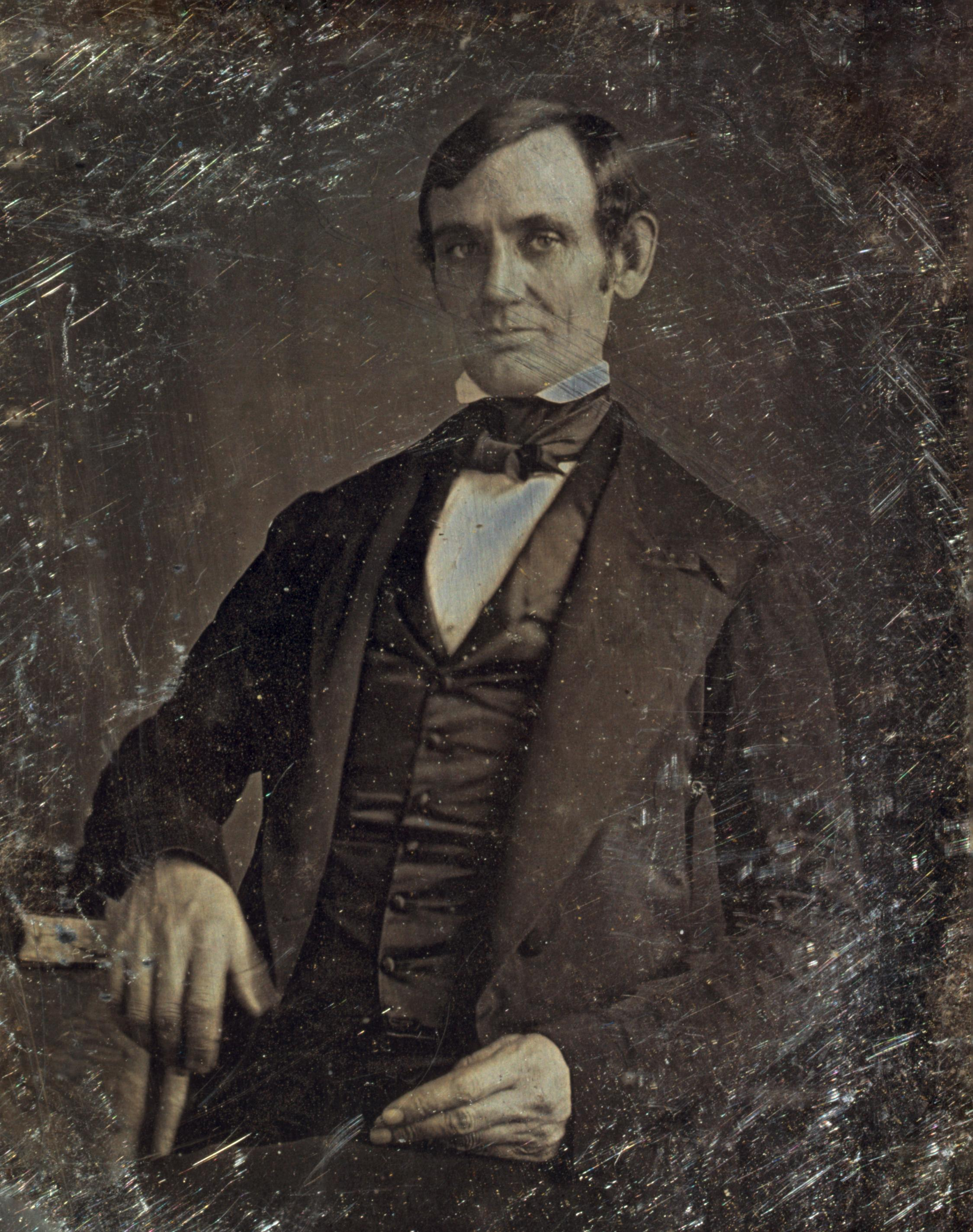
An 1846 daguerreotype of a young Lincoln

Abraham Lincoln's Lyceum Address was delivered to the Young Men's Lyceum of Springfield, Illinois on January 27, 1838, titled "The Perpetuation of Our Political Institutions". In his speech, a 28-year-old Lincoln warned that mobs or people who disrespected U.S. laws and courts could destroy the United States. He went on to say the Constitution and rule of law in the United States should be "the political religion of the nation."

== The speech ==
The topic of Lincoln's speech was citizenship in a constitutional republic and threats to U.S. institutions. In the speech, Lincoln discussed in glowing terms the political regime established by the Founding Fathers, but warned of a destructive force from within. He asked his listeners:

Shall we expect some transatlantic military giant, to step the Ocean, and crush us at a blow? Never! All the armies of Europe, Asia and Africa combined, with all the treasure of the earth (our own excepted) in their military chest; with a Buonaparte for a commander, could not by force, take a drink from the Ohio, or make a track on the Blue Ridge, in a trial of a thousand years. At what point then is the approach of danger to be expected? I answer. If it ever reach us it must spring up amongst us. It cannot come from abroad. If destruction be our lot, we must ourselves be its author and finisher. As a nation of freemen, we must live through all time, or die by suicide.

Lincoln indirectly blamed slavery for lawlessness in the United States. In this context he warned that:

whenever the vicious portion of [our] population shall be permitted to gather in bands of hundreds and thousands, and burn churches, ravage and rob provision stores, throw printing-presses into rivers, shoot editors, and hang and burn obnoxious persons at pleasure and with impunity; depend upon it, this Government cannot last. By such things the feelings of the best citizens will become more or less alienated from it; and thus it will be left without friends, or with too few, and those few, too weak to make their friendship effectual.

Lincoln then warned that a tyrant could overtake the U.S. political system from within, if disregard for the rule of law continued unabated. He said:

It is to deny, what the history of the world tells us is true, to suppose that men of ambition and talents will not continue to spring up amongst us. And, when they do, they will as naturally seek the gratification of their ruling passion as others have so done before them. The question then, is, can that gratification be found in supporting and maintaining an edifice that has been erected by others? Most certainly it cannot. Many great and good men sufficiently qualified for any task they should undertake, may ever be found, whose ambition would aspire to nothing beyond a seat in Congress, a gubernatorial or a presidential chair; but such belong not to the family of the lion or the tribe of the eagle. What! think you these places would satisfy an Alexander, a Caesar, or a Napoleon? Never! Towering genius disdains a beaten path. It seeks regions hitherto unexplored. It sees no distinction in adding story to story, upon the monuments of fame, erected to the memory of others. It denies that it is glory enough to serve under any chief. It scorns to tread in the footsteps of any predecessor, however illustrious. It thirsts and burns for distinction; and, if possible, it will have it, whether at the expense of emancipating slaves or enslaving freemen. Is it unreasonable then to expect, that some man possessed of the loftiest genius, coupled with ambition sufficient to push it to its utmost stretch, will at some time spring up among us? And when such a one does, it will require the people to be united with each other, attached to the government and laws, and generally intelligent, to successfully frustrate his designs. Distinction will be his paramount object; and although he would as willingly, perhaps more so, acquire it by doing good as harm; yet, that opportunity being past, and nothing left to be done in the way of building up, he would set boldly to the task of pulling down.

To prevent this, Lincoln concluded that there was a need to cultivate a "political religion" that emphasizes "reverence for the laws" and puts reliance on "reason—cold, calculating, unimpassioned reason."

During the speech, Lincoln referenced three murders committed by pro-slavery mobs. The first was the lynching of five white gamblers and their alleged black conspirators suspected of fomenting a slave insurrection in Vicksburg, Mississippi on July 4, 1835.

The second was the burning of Francis McIntosh, a freedman who killed a constable, and was subsequently lynched by a mob in St. Louis in 1836. Lincoln also referenced the death of Elijah Parish Lovejoy, a newspaper editor and abolitionist, who was murdered three months earlier by a pro-slavery mob in nearby Alton, Illinois.

== Legacy ==
The address was published in the Sangamon Journal, helping to establish Lincoln's reputation as an orator. As the Lyceum address was one of Lincoln's earliest published speeches, it has been examined thoroughly by historians. Gore Vidal claimed to have used this speech to fully understand Lincoln's character for his historical novel Lincoln.

The speech is re-arranged and slightly misquoted at the beginning of the first episode of Ken Burns's 1990 documentary series The Civil War. This arrangement of the quotation is repeated at the beginning of the song "A More Perfect Union" by New Jersey–based band Titus Andronicus from their second album The Monitor.

A large portion of the speech is used in the Disneyland attraction Great Moments With Mr. Lincoln.

The speech is analyzed in depth by Diana Schaub in His Greatest Speeches: How Lincoln Moved the Nation, St. Martin's Press, 2021 and in Saladin Ambar's Murder on the Mississippi: The Shocking Crimes That Shaped Abraham Lincoln, Diversion Books, 2025.

== See also ==
- Abraham Lincoln and slavery
