= Merton L. Dillon =

American historian (1924–2013)

Merton Dillon
- Born: 4 April 1924; Addison, Michigan, United States
- Died: 3 May 2013 (aged 89); Michigan, United States
- Education: University of Michigan (PhD)
- Occupations: Historian, academic, and author

Merton Lynn Dillon (April 4, 1924 – May 3, 2013) was a history professor and author in the United States. He wrote about slavery and abolitionism. He wrote books about abolitionists including Elijah Lovejoy and Benjamin Lundy.

== Early life and professional career ==
Dillon was born in Addison, Michigan on April 4, 1924. He graduated from Michigan State Normal College in 1945, and began teaching at public schools. He earned a Masters of Arts from the University of Michigan in 1948, and a PhD in 1951. After that, he taught at the New Mexico Military Institute, Texas Tech College, Northern Illinois University, and Ohio State University.

In addition to his work as a professor and author, Dillon served on the Board of Editors for The Journal of Southern History, and chaired the Simkins Award Committee and Nominating Committee. Merton won a senior fellowship from the National Endowment for the Humanities.

Merton L. Dillon died from polymyositis in Michigan on May 3, 2013.

== Books ==
- Dillon, Merton Lynn (1961). Elijah P. Lovejoy: Abolitionist Editor. University of Illinois Press. OCLC 426727. OL 5841391M.
- Dillon, Merton Lynn (1966). Benjamin Lundy and the Struggle for Negro Freedom. University of Illinois Press. OCLC 301394. OL 5985653M.
- Dillon, Merton Lynn (1974). The Abolitionists: The Growth of a Dissenting Minority. Northern Illinois University Press. OCLC 865968. OL 5421613M.
- Dillon, Merton Lynn (1985). Ulrich Bonnell Phillips: Historian of the Old South. Louisiana State University Press. OCLC 12050272. OL 3029684M.
- Dillon, Merton Lynn (1990). Slavery Attacked: Southern Slaves and Their Allies, 1619–1865. Louisiana State University Press. OCLC 21483673. OL 5421613M.

== Articles ==
- Dillon, Merton Lynn (Summer 1954). "Antislavery Movement in Illinois, 1809–1844". Journal of the Illinois State Historical Society. 47 (2): 149–166. JSTOR 40189370.
- Dillon, Merton L. (1969). "The Abolitionists: A Decade of Historiography, 1959–1969". The Journal of Southern History. 35 (4): 500–522. doi:10.2307/2206837. JSTOR 2206837.
- Dillon, Merton L. (ed.). "A Visit to the Ohio State Prison in 1837". Ohio History Journal. 69: 67–72.

== Additional resources ==
- "Merton Dillon papers, 1970–1990" [Textual record]. Ohio State University faculty papers. Ohio State University. OCLC 40923548.
