= Owen Lovejoy =

1850s Congressman and Abolitionist

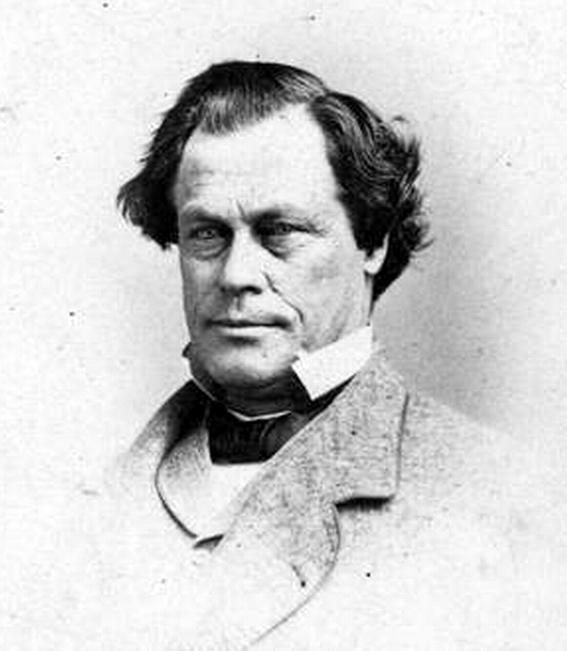
- Lovejoy (1850s) by J. Gurney & Son

Member of the U.S. House of Representatives from Illinois
- In office March 4, 1857 – March 25, 1864
- Preceded by: Jesse O. Norton
- Succeeded by: Ebon C. Ingersoll
- Constituency: 3rd district (1857–1863); 5th district (1863–1864)

Personal details
- Born: January 6, 1811 Albion, Maine, U.S.
- Died: March 25, 1864 (aged 53) New York City, U.S.
- Party: Republican
- Spouse: Eunice Lovejoy
- Relations: Elijah Lovejoy (brother); Joseph Cammett Lovejoy (brother); Nathan A. Farwell (cousin)
- Education: Bowdoin College
- Occupation: Minister
- Website: BioGuide

Owen Lovejoy (January 6, 1811 – March 25, 1864) was an American lawyer, Congregational minister, abolitionist, and Republican congressman from Illinois. He was also a "conductor" on the Underground Railroad. After his brother Elijah Lovejoy was murdered in November 1837 by pro-slavery forces, Owen, a friend of Abraham Lincoln, became a leader of abolitionists in Illinois, condemning slavery and assisting runaway slaves in escaping to freedom.

== Early life and education ==
Born in Albion, Maine, in 1811, Lovejoy was one of five brothers born to Elizabeth (Patee) and Daniel Lovejoy, a Congregational minister and farmer. He worked with his family on the farm until he was 18, and his parents encouraged his education. His father was a Congregational minister and his mother was very devout. Lovejoy attended Bowdoin College from 1830 to 1833. He studied law but never practiced.

== Career ==
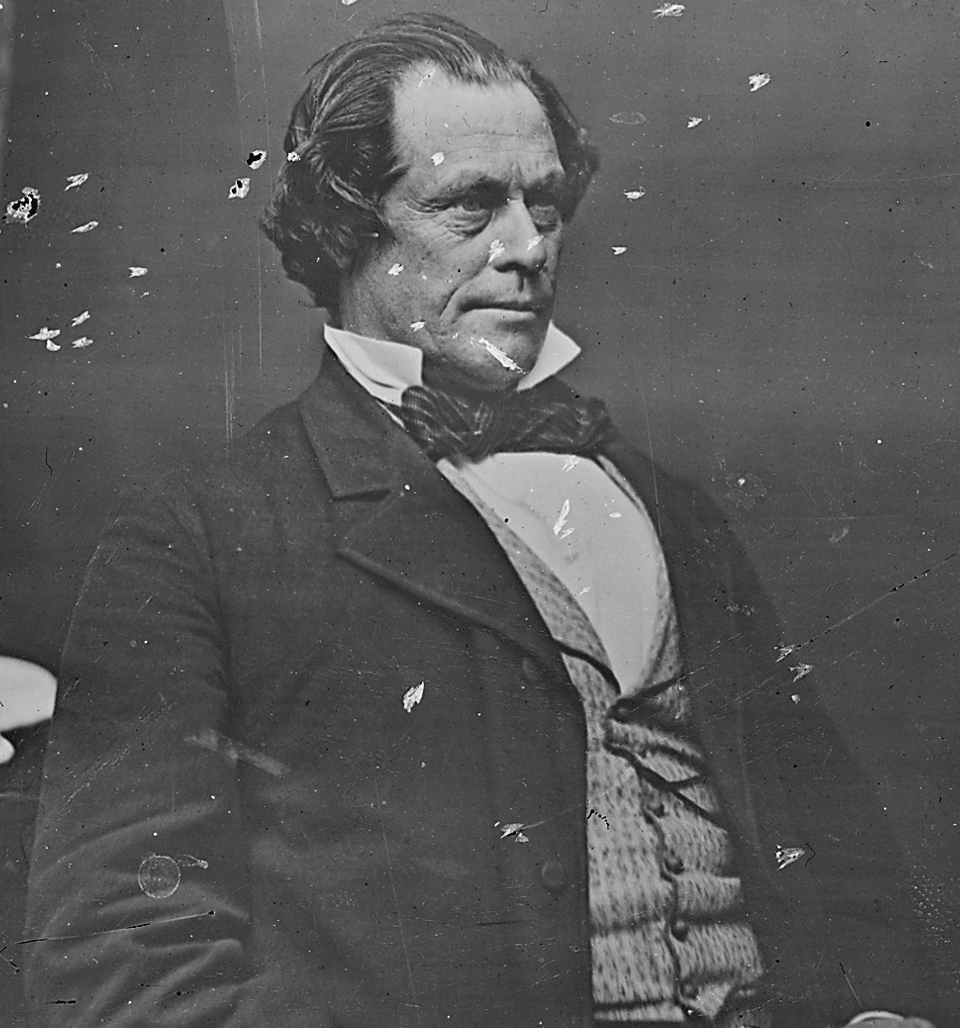
Photograph by Mathew Brady (1864, cropped)

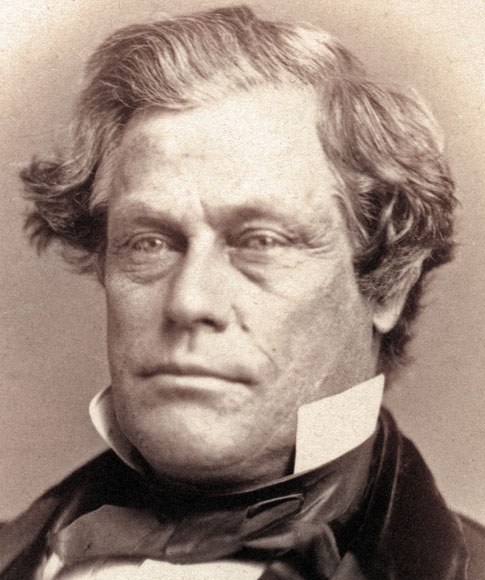
Lovejoy in 1859

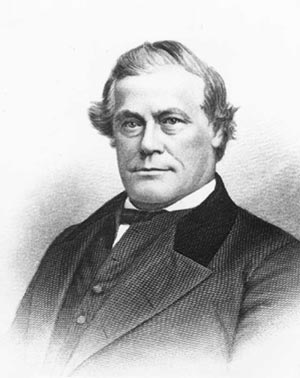
A posthumous portrait from 1915

Lovejoy migrated to Alton, Illinois, where his older brother Elijah Parish Lovejoy had moved in 1836 from St. Louis, because of hostility to his anti-slavery activities. The older Lovejoy was by then an anti-slavery Presbyterian minister who edited the Alton Observer, an abolitionist newspaper. The younger brother studied theology there.

Owen was present on the night of November 7, 1837 when his brother Elijah was murdered while trying to defend the printing press of the Illinois Anti-Slavery Society from an angry mob. He is reported to have sworn on his brother's grave to "never forsake the cause that had been sprinkled with my brother's blood." Owen and his brother Joseph C. Lovejoy wrote Memoir of Elijah P. Lovejoy (1838), which was distributed widely by the American Anti-Slavery Society, increasing Elijah's fame after his death and adding to the abolition cause.

Lovejoy served as pastor of the Congregational Church in Princeton, Illinois from 1838 to 1856. During these years, he also organized a number of the 115 anti-slavery Congregational churches in Illinois begun by the American Missionary Association, founded in 1846. His activities brought him increasing public prominence.

In 1854 Lovejoy was elected a member of the Illinois State Legislature. He worked with Abraham Lincoln and others to form the Republican Party in the state, and he and Lincoln remained close friends. In 1856, he was elected as a Republican from Illinois as Representative to the 35th United States Congress and succeeding Congresses, serving from March 4, 1857, until his death.

In February 1859, Lovejoy responded to anti-abolitionists' charges that by aiding runaway slaves and opposing slavery he was a "negro stealer", saying on the floor of Congress that:

If [you ask] whether I assist fugitive slaves...I march right up to the confessional and say, I do! Proclaim it upon the house-tops! Write it upon every leaf that trembles in the forest! Make it blaze from the sun at high noon and shine forth in the radiance of every star that bedecks the firmament of God. Let it echo through all the arches of heaven, and reverberate and bellow through all the deep gorges of hell, where slave catchers will be very likely to hear it. Owen Lovejoy lives at Princeton, Illinois, three-quarters of a mile east of the village, and he aids every fugitive that comes to his door and asks it. Thou invisible demon of slavery! Dost thou think to cross my humble threshold, and forbid me to give bread to the hungry and shelter to the houseless? I bid you defiance in the name of my God.

Lovejoy was a platform speaker in support of Abraham Lincoln in the famous debates with Stephen A. Douglas. While in Congress, he "introduced the final bill to end slavery in the District of Columbia," long a goal of the American Anti-Slavery Society. He also helped gain passage of legislation prohibiting slavery in the territories. He was one of the few steadfast Congressional supporters of Lincoln during the American Civil War. Lincoln wrote, "To the day of his death, it would scarcely wrong any other to say, he was my most generous friend."

In an April 5, 1860 speech before the U.S. House of Representatives, Lovejoy castigated the Democrats and their racist justifications for supporting slavery, saying:

The principle of enslaving human beings because they are inferior, is this. If a man is a cripple, trip him up; if he is old and weak, and bowed with the weight of years, strike him, for he cannot strike back; if idiotic, take advantage of him; and if a child, deceive him. This, sir, this is the doctrine of Democrats and the doctrine of devils as well, and there is no place in the universe outside the five points of hell and the Democratic Party where the practice and prevalence of such doctrines would not be a disgrace.

As Lovejoy gave his speech condemning slavery, several Democrats in the audience, such as Roger Atkinson Pryor, became irate and incensed. Profoundly objecting to Lovejoy's anti-slavery remarks, the Democrats, brandishing pistols and canes, threatened him with physical harm, to which the Republicans present pledged to defend Lovejoy if the Democrats attempted to attack him. In response to the Democrats' threats, Lovejoy stood firm and responded, "I will stand where I please" and "Nobody can intimidate me." The day after the speech, it was re-printed in 55 newspapers across the country. Regarding the incident, Lovejoy stated in a letter to his wife Eunice that "I poured on a rainstorm of fire and brimstone as hot as I could, and you know something of what that is. I believe that I never said anything more Savage in the pulpit or on the stump."

== Later life and death ==
Lovejoy died in Brooklyn, New York, in 1864. His body was returned to Illinois for burial at Oakland Cemetery in Princeton. When he died Lincoln stated: "I've lost the best friend I had in the house [of representatives]"

== Personal life ==
Lovejoy was the cousin of Maine Senator Nathan A. Farwell.

== Legacy ==
- The city of Princeton maintains and preserves his home, the Owen Lovejoy House, as a house museum. Designated a National Historic Landmark in 1997 by the National Park Service as part of the Underground Railroad, the house has a secret compartment for hiding fugitives liberated from prior enslavement. It is open to the public to view.
- After his death, an obelisk was erected in Princeton in his honor, and a letter from U.S. President Lincoln said: "Let him have his marble monument along with the well assured and more enduring one in the hearts of all those who love Liberty unselfishly and for all."

== See also ==
- List of members of the United States Congress who died in office (1790–1899)

U.S. House of Representatives
Preceded by Jesse O. Norton	Member of the U.S. House of Representatives from Illinois's 3rd congressional district 1857–1863	Succeeded by Elihu B. Washburne
Preceded by William A. Richardson	Member of the U.S. House of Representatives from Illinois's 5th congressional district 1863–1864	Succeeded by Ebon C. Ingersoll
