= Elijah P. Lovejoy Monument =

Memorial in Alton, Illinois

Lovejoy Monument
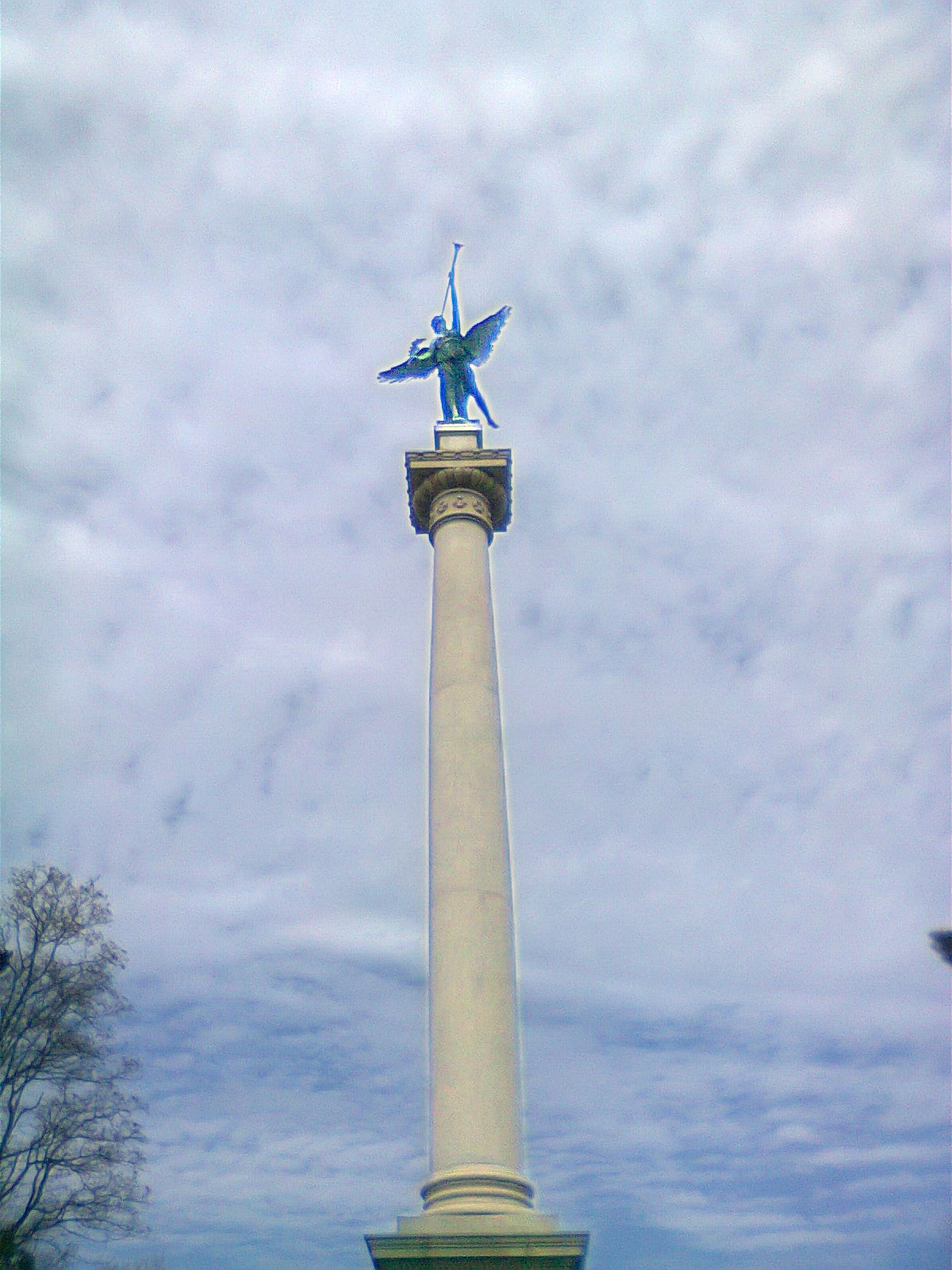
- The 110-foot tall spire of the Lovejoy monument

- Location within the United States
- 38°53′24.5″N 90°09′57.2″W
- Location: Alton, Illinois

History
- Established: 1897
- Built: 1897

Site notes
- Area: 106.01 acres (0.4290 km^{2})
- Architect: R. P. Bringhurst
- Governing body: Greater Alton/Twin Rivers Convention and Visitors Bureau
- Visitors: 467,550 (in 2005)

The Elijah P. Lovejoy Monument, also known as the Elijah Lovejoy Monument, Elijah Parrish Lovejoy Shaft, Lovejoy Monument, and Lovejoy State Memorial, is a memorial in Alton, Illinois, to Elijah P. Lovejoy, an advocate of free speech and the abolition of slavery.

Lovejoy had moved his press across the Mississippi River to Alton after his offices were attacked three times by pro-slavery forces at his former location in St. Louis, Missouri. He hid the press in a warehouse before setting up his new operation but was attacked again on November 7, 1837. He was fatally shot that night when the warehouse was attacked and destroyed by a pro-slavery mob.

== History ==
Elijah P. Lovejoy (1802-1837) was an abolitionist in the 1830s, running a newspaper called the St Louis Observer in Missouri, a slave state. Slavery advocates attacked and destroyed his presses three times. He decided to move across the river to Alton, Illinois, in 1837, where he renamed his newspaper as the Alton Observer.

Although Illinois was a free state, there were numerous people in the area who supported slavery. Southern Illinois was settled by many slaveowners from the South. On November 7, 1837, a crowd attacked the warehouse owned by Winthrop Sargent Gilman, an abolitionist who had groceries in St. Louis and aided Lovejoy in acquiring his fourth press.

Lovejoy and some supporters were in the warehouse where the presses were stored. As the building was stormed, the attackers apparently began firing guns. Lovejoy and his men returned fire, but in the conflict Lovejoy was killed.

His death garnered national attention. He was considered a martyr in the causes of both freedom of speech and the abolition of slavery.

In 1857, Abraham Lincoln wrote to a friend about this event:

Lovejoy's tragic death for freedom in every sense marked his sad ending as the most important single event that ever happened in the new world.

"- Abraham Lincoln, 1857 letter to friend Lemen"

The following year, Lincoln gave his House Divided speech in June 1858 during his campaign for the US Senate seat representing Illinois.

Having been buried in an unmarked grave in Alton, Lovejoy's remains became lost for some time. Dimmock led an effort to find them, discovering the site was partially covered by a roadway. Lovejoy's remains were exhumed and reinterred in the cemetery that is now overlooked by his monument. Dimmock arranged for installation of a gravestone here.

In the 1890s, work began in earnest on the monument. It was designed by R. P. Bringhurst, a St. Louis sculptor, and built by Culver Stone Company of Springfield, Illinois.

== Structure ==
The monument consists of a 93-foot-tall main shaft topped by a 17-foot-tall winged statue of victory. Located on a bluff, the complete work stands more than 300 feet above the Mississippi river below. It has two side spires mounted by eagles, as well as two bronze lion chalice statues. A stone whispering wall bench wraps around the central spire. Visitors can hear someone whispering who is completely out of sight on the opposite side.

Located on top of the river bluff, the monument is easily seen from a distance. Travelers over the bridge from Missouri into Illinois can see it from a considerable distance away.

The four sides of the central spire's pedestal contain quotes by Lovejoy. These give examples of major aspects of his life:

Champion of Free Speech.

But, gentlemen, as long as I am an American citizen, and as long as American blood runs in these veins, I shall hold myself at liberty to speak, to write, to publish whatever I please on any subject--being amenable to the laws of my country for the same.

Salve, Victores!

This monument commemorates the valor, devotion and sacrifice of the noble Defenders of the Press, who, in this city, on Nov. 7, 1837, made the first armed resistance to the aggressions of the slave power in America.

Minister of the Gospel. Moderator of Alton Presbytery,

If the laws of my country fail to protect me I appeal to God, and with him I cheerfully rest my cause. I can die at my post but I cannot desert it.

Elijah P. Lovejoy, Editor Alton Observer, Albion, Maine, Nov. 8, 1802 Alton, Ill., Nov. 7, 1837.

A Martyr to Liberty.

I have sworn eternal opposition to slavery, and by the blessing of God, I will never go back.

== Gallery ==
Panoramic photo of the entire monument

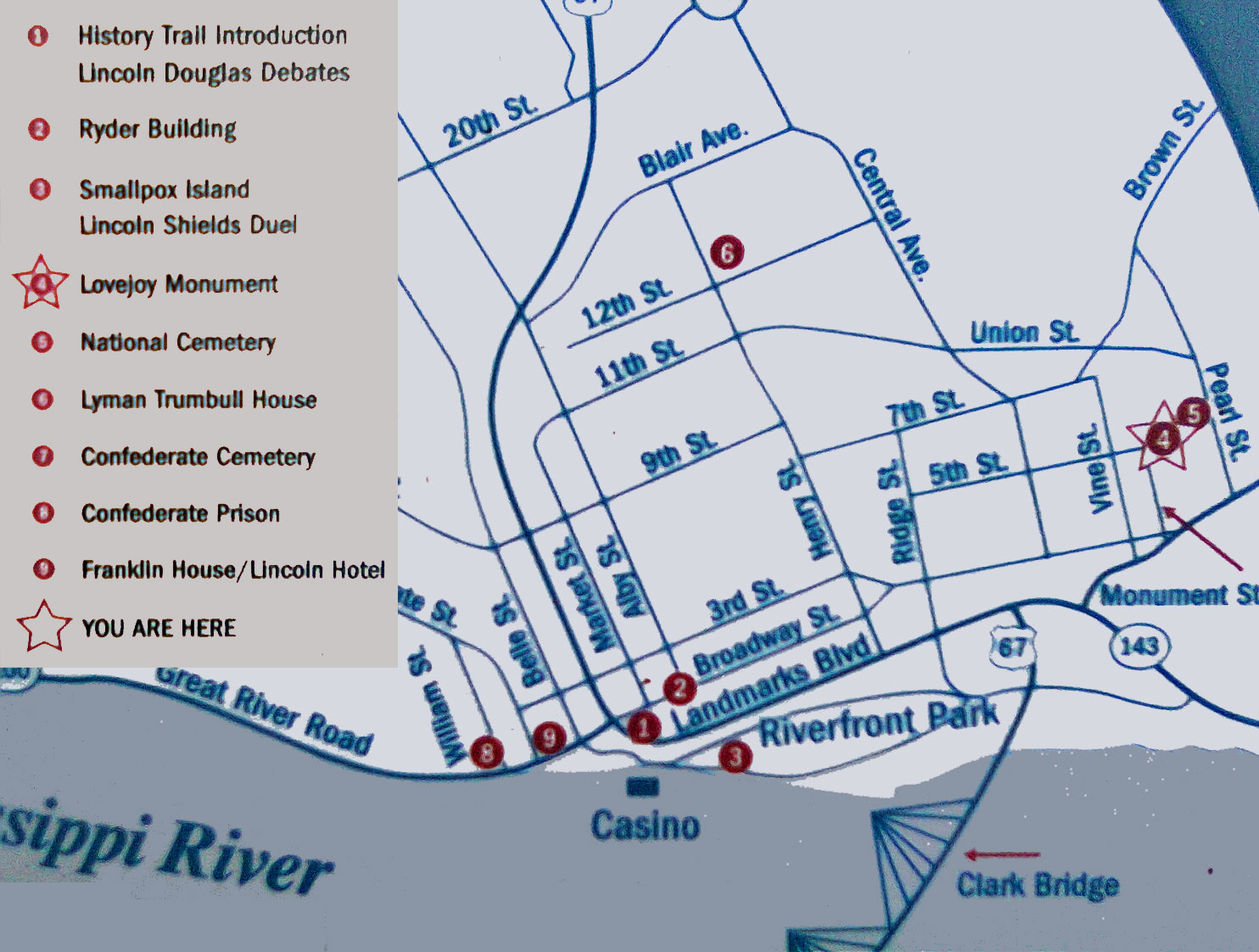
Map showing the monument as "You are Here"

Lion chalice

The monument, as seen from the street

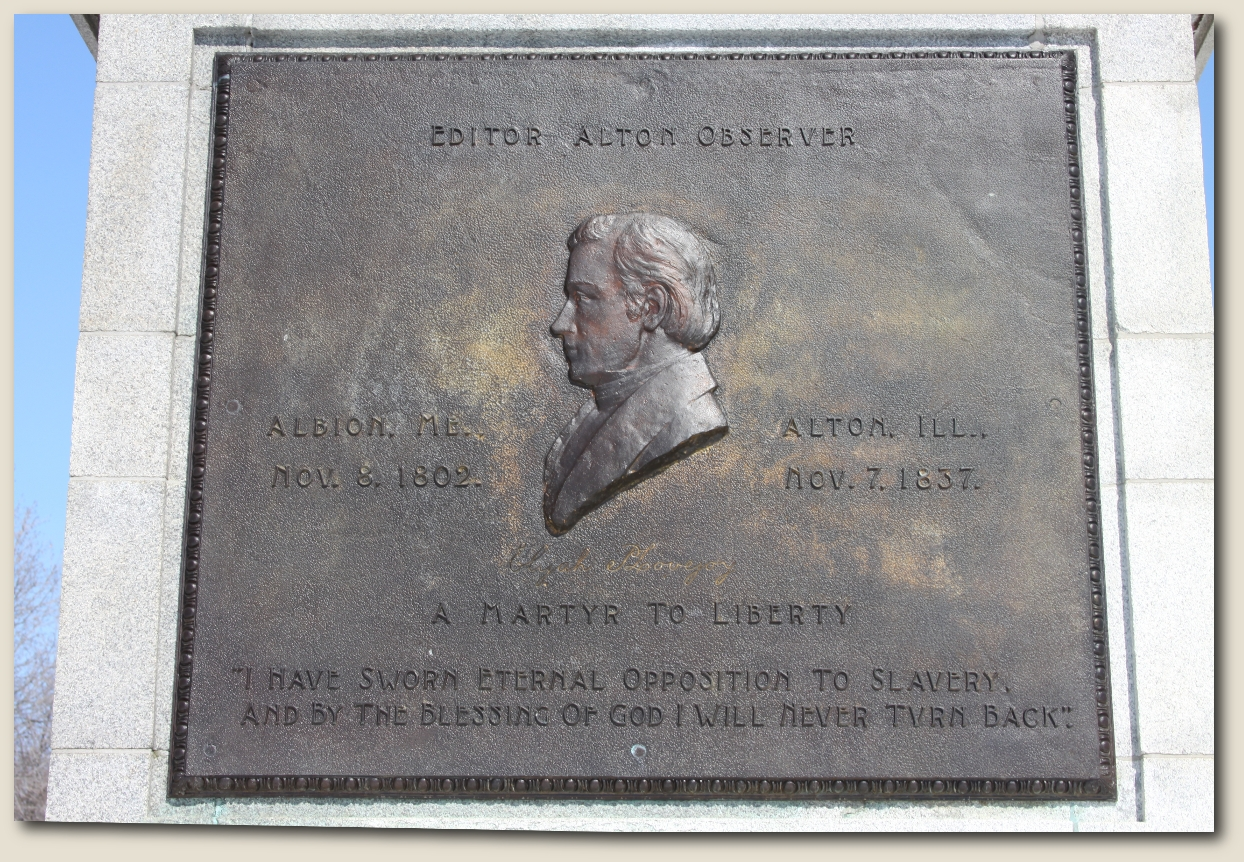
Plaque on the front of the monument

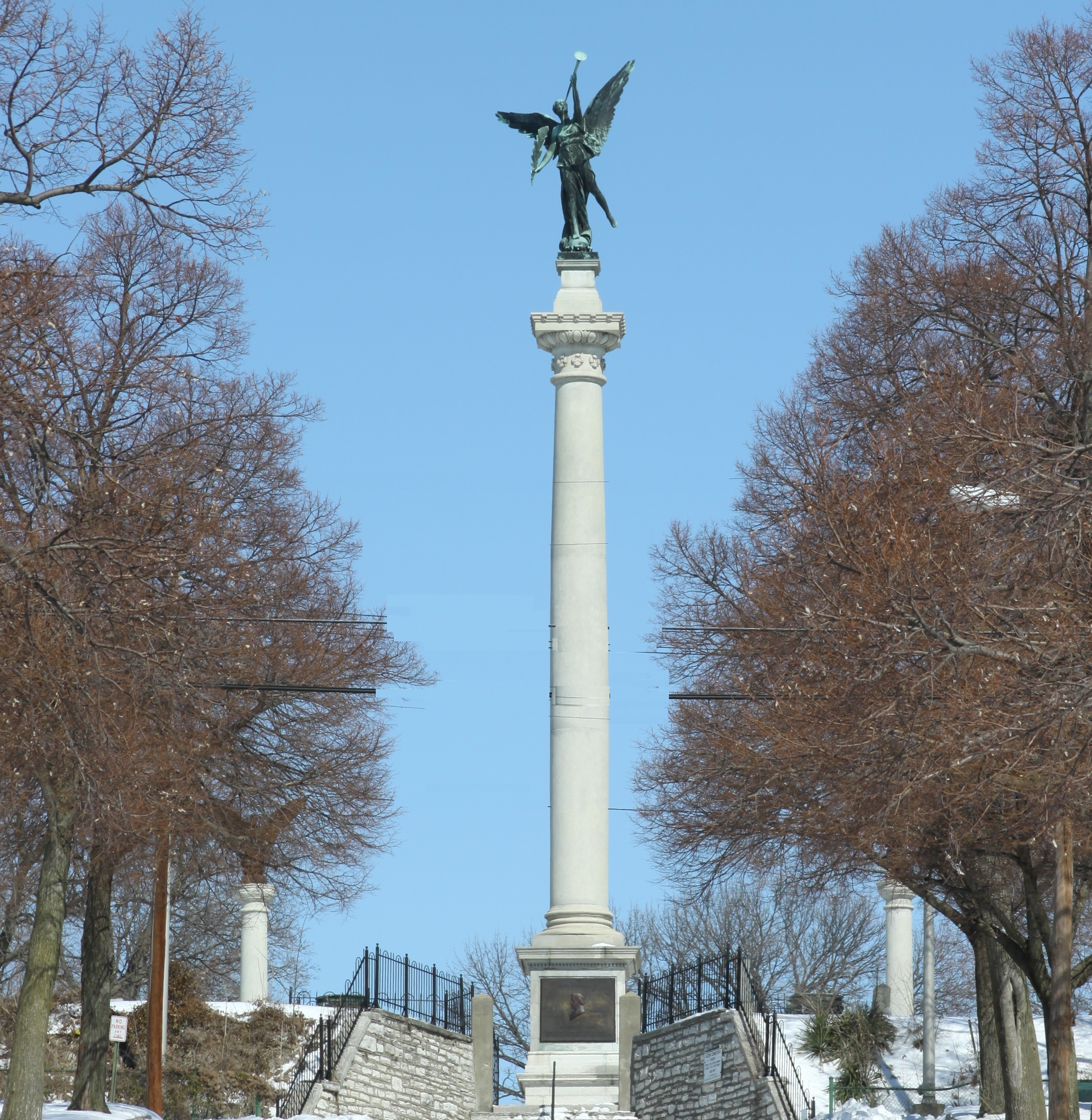
Monument looking up from Monument Avenue. This photo edited to remove the power lines

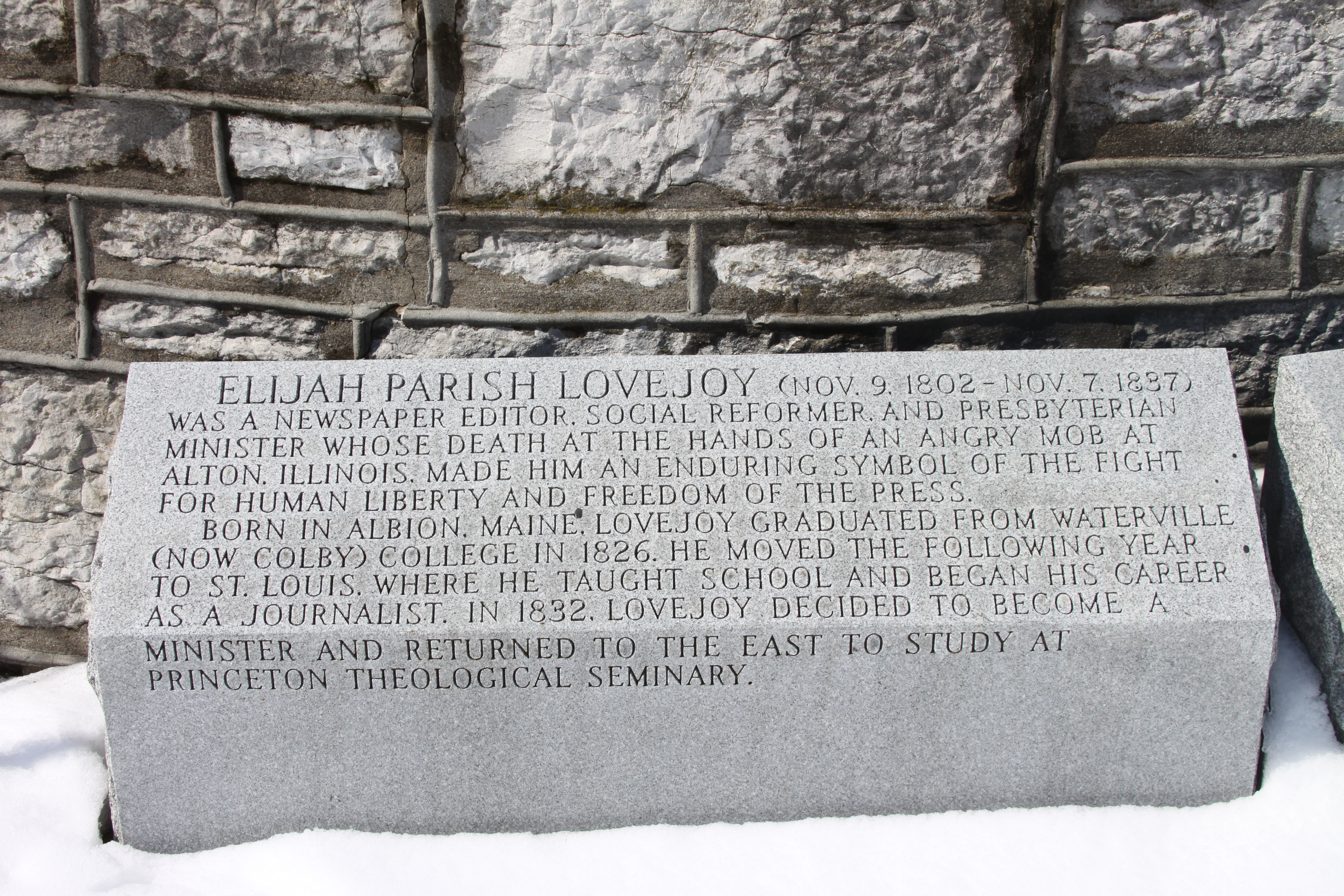
First Block of Elijah Lovejoy's story to the left of the monument

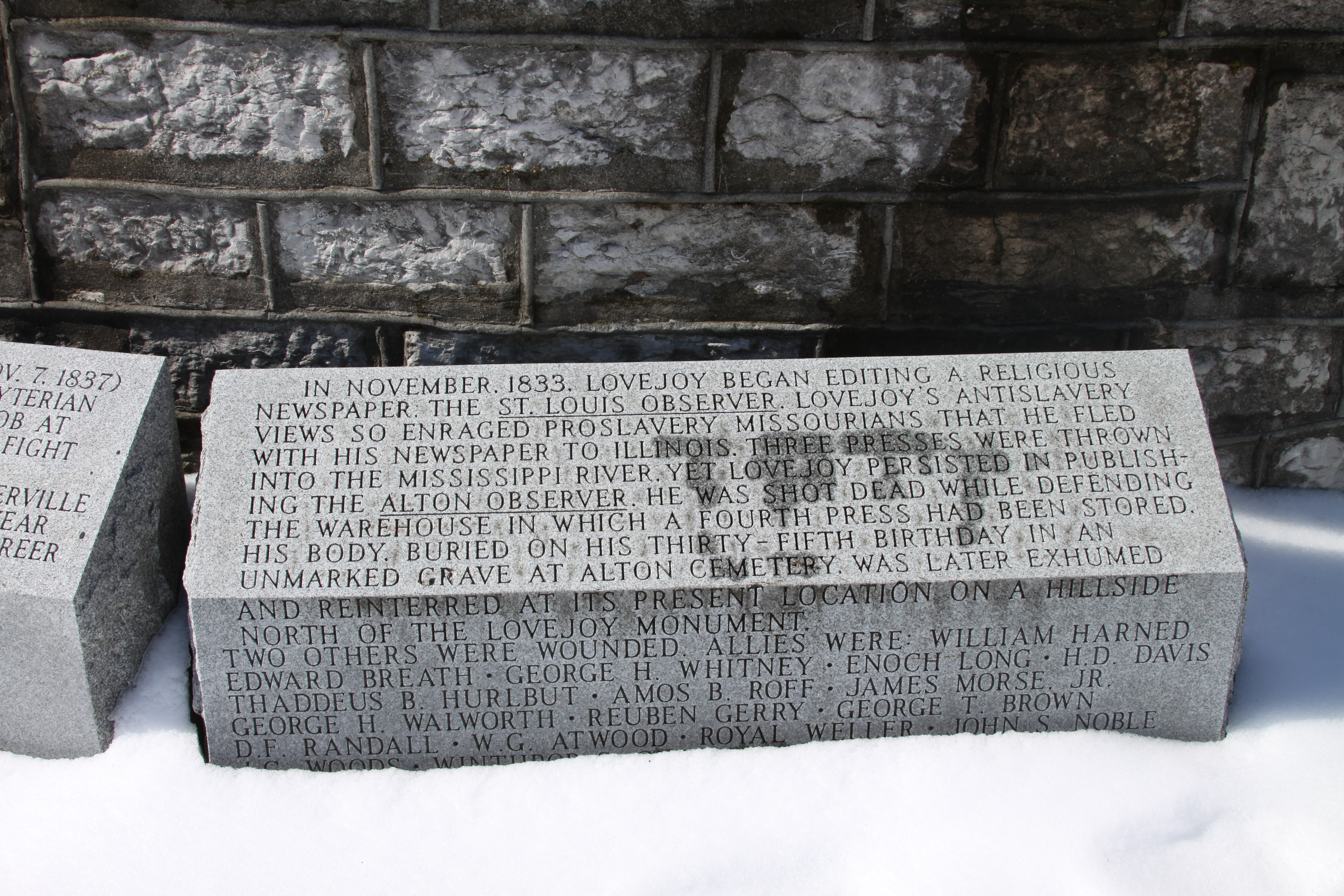
Second block of Elijah Lovejoy's story to the left of the monument at the top of the steps

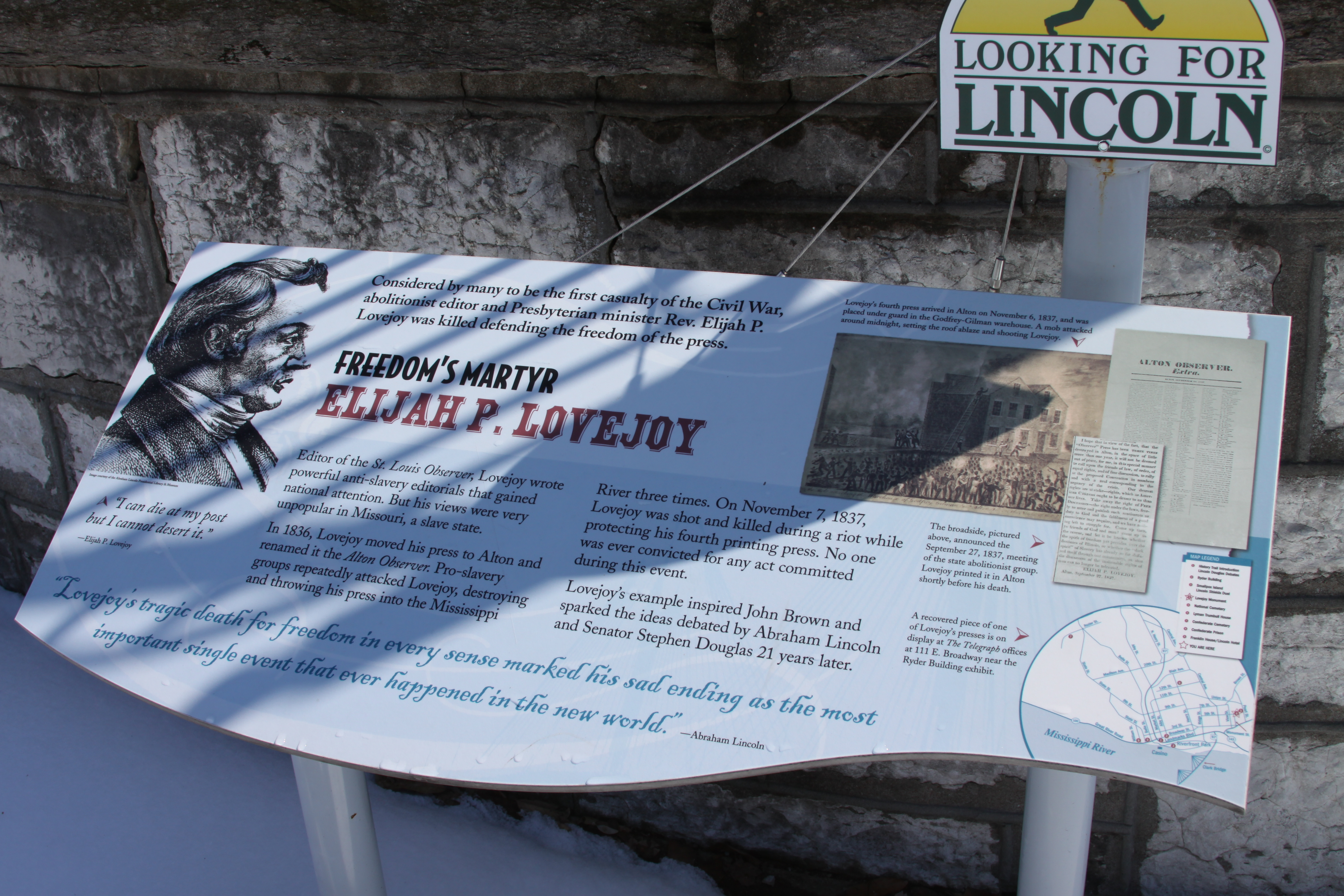
Storyboard to the right of the monument
