= Elijah Parish Lovejoy =

American minister, journalist, and abolitionist (1802–1837)

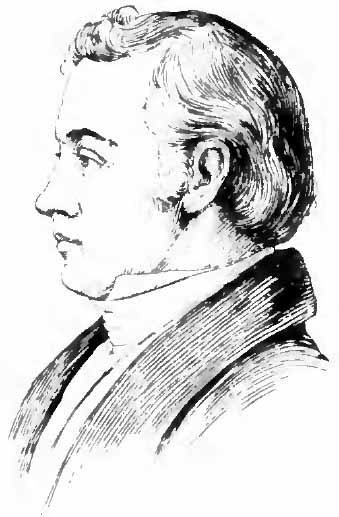
- Born: November 9, 1802; Albion, Massachusetts (now in Maine), U.S.
- Died: November 7, 1837 (aged 34); Alton, Illinois, U.S.
- Cause of death: Murder by mob
- Resting place: Alton Cemetery
- Education: Waterville College
- Spouse: Celia Ann French (m. 1835)
- Children: 2
- Relatives: Owen Lovejoy (brother); Nathan A. Farwell (cousin)

Elijah Parish Lovejoy (November 9, 1802 – November 7, 1837) was an American Presbyterian minister, journalist, newspaper editor, and Christian abolitionist. After his murder by a mob, he became a martyr to the abolitionist cause opposing slavery in the United States. He was also hailed as a defender of free speech and freedom of the press.

Lovejoy was born in New England and graduated from what is today Colby College. Unsatisfied with a teaching career, he was drawn to journalism and decided to 'go west'. In 1827, he reached St. Louis, Missouri. Under the Missouri Compromise of 1820, Missouri entered the United States as a slave state. Lovejoy edited a newspaper but returned east for a time to study for the ministry at Princeton Theological Seminary. On his return to St. Louis, he founded the St. Louis Observer, in which he became increasingly critical of slavery and the powerful interests protecting slavery. Facing threats and violent attacks, Lovejoy decided to move across the river to Alton in Illinois, a free state. However, Alton was also tied to the Mississippi River economy, easily reachable by anti-Lovejoy Missourians, and badly split over abolitionism.

In Alton, Lovejoy was fatally shot during an attack by a pro-slavery mob. The mob was seeking to destroy a warehouse owned by Winthrop Sargent Gilman and Benjamin Godfrey, which held Lovejoy's printing press and abolitionist materials. According to John Quincy Adams, the murder "[gave] a shock as of an earthquake throughout this country." The Boston Recorder wrote that "these events called forth from every part of the land 'a burst of indignation which has not had its parallel in this country since the Battle of Lexington.'" When informed about the murder, John Brown said publicly: "Here, before God, in the presence of these witnesses, from this time, I consecrate my life to the destruction of slavery." Lovejoy is often seen as a martyr to the abolitionist cause and to a free press. The Lovejoy Monument was erected in Alton in 1897.

== Early life and education ==
Elijah Parish Lovejoy was born at his paternal grandparents' frontier farmhouse near Albion, Maine (then part of Massachusetts), the eldest of nine children of Elizabeth (née Pattee) Lovejoy and Daniel Lovejoy. Lovejoy's father was a Congregational preacher and farmer, and his mother was a homemaker and a devout Christian. Daniel Lovejoy named his son in honor of his close friend and mentor, Elijah Parish, a minister who was also involved in politics. Due to his own lack of education, the father encouraged his sons – Elijah, Daniel, Joseph Cammett, Owen, and John – to become educated. Elijah was taught by his mother to read the Bible and other religious texts at an early age.

After completing early studies in public schools, Lovejoy attended the private Academy at Monmouth and China Academy. When sufficiently proficient in Latin and mathematics, he enrolled at Waterville College (now Colby College) as a sophomore in 1823. Lovejoy received financial support from minister Benjamin Tappan to continue his studies there. Based on faculty recommendations, from 1824 until his graduation in 1826, he also served as headmaster of Colby's associated high school, the Latin School (later known as the Coburn Classical Institute). In September 1826, Lovejoy graduated cum laude from Waterville, and was class valedictorian.

=== Journey westward ===
During the winter and spring, he taught at China Academy in Maine. Dissatisfied with teaching, Lovejoy considered moving to the American South or westward to the Northwest Territory. His former teachers at Waterville College advised him that he would best serve God in the West (now considered the American Midwest).

In May 1827, he went to Boston to earn money for his journey, having settled on the free state of Illinois as his destination. Unsuccessful at finding work, he started for Illinois by foot. He stopped in New York City in mid-June to try to find work. He eventually landed a position with the Saturday Evening Gazette as a newspaper subscription peddler. For nearly five weeks, he worked to sell subscriptions.

Struggling with his finances, he wrote to Jeremiah Chaplin, president of Waterville College, explaining his situation. Chaplin sent the money that his former student needed. Before embarking on his journey westward, Lovejoy wrote a poem which later seemed to prophesy his death:

I go to tread
The Western vales, whose gloomy cypress tree
Shall haply, soon be enwreathed upon my bier;
Land of my birth! My natal soil, Farewell
—Elijah P. Lovejoy

== Career in Missouri ==
In 1827, Lovejoy arrived in St. Louis, Missouri, a major port in a slave state that shared its longest border with the free state of Illinois. Although it had a large slave market, St. Louis identified itself less with the plantation South and more as the "gateway to the West" and the American "frontier."

Lovejoy initially ran a private school in St. Louis with a friend, which they modeled after academies in the East. Lovejoy's interest in teaching waned, however, when local editors began publishing his poems in their newspapers.

=== St. Louis Times ===
In 1829, Lovejoy became a co-editor with T. J. Miller of the St. Louis Times, which promoted the candidacy of Henry Clay for president of the United States. Working at the Times introduced him to like-minded community leaders, many of whom were members of the American Colonization Society. They supported sending freed American blacks to Africa, considering it a kind of "repatriation." Opponents of the ACS including Frederick Douglass noted most African Americans had been native-born for generations and considered their future to be in the U.S. Among Lovejoy's new acquaintances were prominent St. Louis attorneys and slaveholders such as Edward Bates (later U.S. Attorney General under President Abraham Lincoln); Hamilton R. Gamble, later Chief Justice of the Missouri Supreme Court; and his brother Archibald Gamble.

Lovejoy occasionally hired slaves who were leased out by owners, to work with him at the paper. Among them was William Wells Brown, who later recounted his experience in a memoir. Brown described Lovejoy as "a very good man, and decidedly the best master that I had ever had. I am chiefly indebted to him, and to my employment in the printing office, for what little learning I obtained while in slavery."

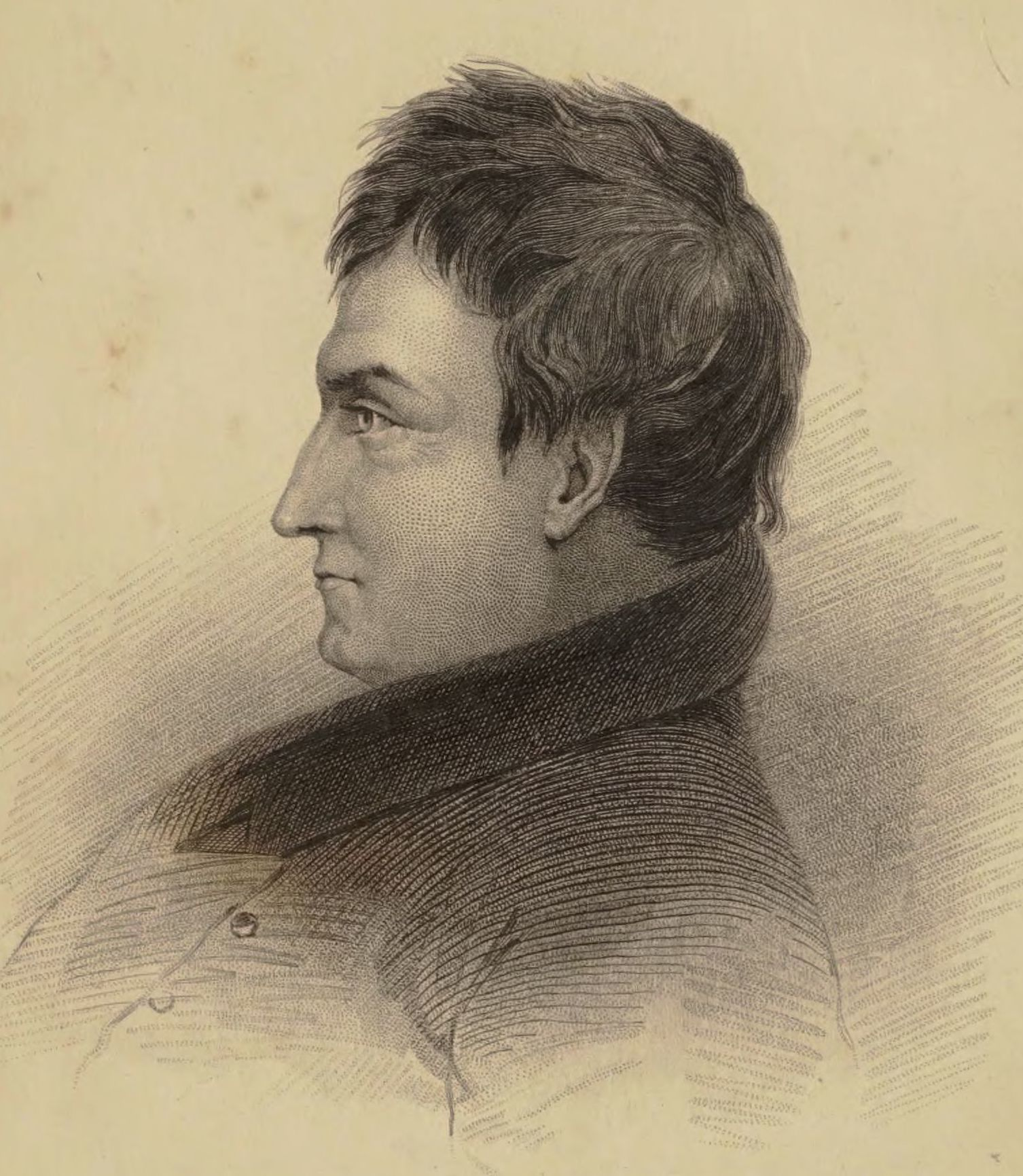
Reverend David Nelson influenced Lovejoy's antislavery views.

=== Theological training ===
Lovejoy struggled with his interest in religion, often writing to his parents about his sinfulness and rebellion against God. He attended revival meetings in 1831 led by William S. Potts, pastor of First Presbyterian Church, that rekindled his interest in religion for a time. However, Lovejoy admitted to his parents that "gradually these feelings all left me, and I returned to the world a more hardened sinner than ever."

A year later, Lovejoy found the call to God he had been yearning for. In 1832, influenced by Christian revivalist meetings led by abolitionist David Nelson, he joined the First Presbyterian Church and decided to become a preacher. He sold his interest in the Times, and returned East to study at Princeton Theological Seminary. While he was at Princeton, Lovejoy debated the question of slavery with an abolitionist named Bradford. Although Lovejoy had opposed abolitionism during the debate, after returning to St. Louis he would write to Bradford repeatedly asking him to write articles for his newspaper.

After graduation, he went to Philadelphia, where he became an ordained minister of the Presbyterian Church on April 18, 1833.

=== St. Louis Observer ===
In 1833, a group of Protestants in St. Louis offered to finance a religious newspaper if Lovejoy would agree to return and edit it. Lovejoy accepted and on November 22, 1833, he published the first issue of the St. Louis Observer. His editorials criticized both the Catholic Church and slavery. By 1830, sixty percent of the population of St. Louis was Catholic, and the proprietors of the Observer tasked Lovejoy with countering the increasing influence of Catholicism.

From the fall of 1833 to the summer 1836, Lovejoy regularly published articles criticizing the Catholic Church and church doctrine. Some were written by Lovejoy, while others were contributed by other authors. Initially, he criticized Catholic beliefs such as transubstantiation, clerical celibacy, and the influence of Catholicism on foreign governments. He also argued that "Popery" undermined the fundamental principles of American democracy. Local Catholics and clergy were offended by these attacks and regularly responded in articles of their own in The Shepherd of the Times, a Catholic newspaper funded by Bishop Joseph Rosati.

In 1834, the St. Louis Observer began to increase its coverage of slavery, the most controversial issue of the day. At first, Lovejoy resisted calling himself an abolitionist, because he disliked the negative connotations associating abolitionism with social unrest. Even as he expressed antislavery views, he claimed to be an "emancipationist" rather than an "abolitionist." In the spring of 1835, the Missouri Republican advocated the gradual emancipation of slaves in Missouri, and Lovejoy voiced his support through the Observer. Lovejoy urged antislavery groups in Missouri to push for the issue to be addressed during a proposed state constitutional convention. To their dismay, the editors of both newspapers soon found that their "moderate" proposal to end slavery gradually could not be discussed without igniting a polarizing political debate.

Over time, Lovejoy became bolder and more outspoken about his antislavery views, advocating the outright emancipation of all slaves on religious and moral grounds. Lovejoy condemned slavery and "implored all Christians who owned slaves to recognize that slaves were human beings who possessed a soul," and famously wrote:

Slavery, as it exists among us ... is demonstrably an evil. In every community where it exists, it presses like a nightmare on the body politic. Or, like the vampire, it slowly and imperceptibly sucks away the life-blood of society, leaving it faint and disheartened to stagger along the road of improvement.

=== Threats of violence ===
Lovejoy's views on slavery began to incite complaints and threats. Pro-slavery proponents condemned anti-slavery coverage which appeared in newspapers, stating that it was against "the vital interests of the slaveholding states." Lovejoy was threatened to be tarred and feathered if he continued to publish anti-slavery content.

By October 1835, there were rumors of mob action against The Observer. A group of prominent St. Louisans, including many of Lovejoy's friends, wrote a letter pleading with him to cease discussion of slavery in the newspaper. Lovejoy was away from the city at this time, and the publishers declared that no further articles on slavery would be published during his absence. They said that when he returned, he would follow a more rigorous editorial policy. Lovejoy responded by expressing disagreement with the publishers' policy. As tensions over slavery escalated in St. Louis, Lovejoy would not back down from his convictions; he sensed that he would become a martyr for the cause. He was asked to resign as editor of The Observer, to which he agreed. After the newspaper's owners released The Observer property to the moneylender who held the mortgage, the new owners asked Lovejoy to stay on as editor.

==== Lynching of Francis McIntosh ====
Lovejoy and The Observer continued to be embroiled in controversy. In April 1836, Francis McIntosh, a free man of color and boatman, was arrested by two policemen. En route to the jail, McIntosh grabbed a knife and stabbed both men. One was killed and the other seriously injured. McIntosh attempted to escape, but was caught by a white mob, who tied him up and burned him to death. Some of the mob were brought before a grand jury to face charges. The presiding judge, Judge Luke Lawless, refused to convict anyone; he said the crime was a spontaneous mob action without any specific people to prosecute. The judge made remarks suggesting that abolitionists, including Lovejoy and The Observer, had incited McIntosh into stabbing the policemen.

== Marriage and family ==
Lovejoy also served as an evangelist preacher. He traveled a circuit across the state, during which he met Celia Ann French of St. Charles, located on the Missouri River west of St. Louis, now a suburb of the city. She was the daughter of Thomas French, a lawyer who came to St. Charles in the 1820s. The couple were married on March 4, 1835. Their son Edward P. Lovejoy was born in 1836. Their second child was born after Elijah's death and died as an infant. (Note: Elijah and Celia Lovejoy's second child, who died as an infant, was identified as a son by the Alton Evening Telegraph in 1937, but as a daughter in the St. Louis Post-Dispatch in 1987.) In a letter to his mother, Elijah had written about Celia:

My dear wife is a perfect heroine... never has she by a single word attempted to turn me from the scene of warfare and danger – never has she whispered a feeling of discontent at the hardships to which she has been subjected in consequence of her marriage to me, and those have been neither few nor small.

== Move to Illinois ==
In the summer of 1836, Lovejoy attended the General Assembly of the Presbyterian Church in Pittsburgh and met several followers of abolitionist Theodore Weld. At the assembly, Lovejoy was frustrated by the church's hesitation to fully support petitions for abolition and drafted a protest submitted to church leadership. By this time, he had fully embraced the label of "abolitionist."

In the face of all the negative publicity and two break-ins in May 1836, Lovejoy decided to move The Observer across the Mississippi River to Alton, Illinois. At the time, Alton was a large and prosperous river port (many times larger than the frontier town of Chicago). Although Illinois was a free state, Alton was also a center for slave catchers and pro-slavery forces active in the southern area. Many refugee slaves crossed the Mississippi River from Missouri, and attempted to reach freedom on the underground railroad. Among Alton's residents were pro-slavery Southerners who thought Alton should not become a haven for escaped slaves.

On July 21, 1836, Lovejoy published a scathing editorial in St. Louis criticizing the way that the Missouri court's Judge Luke Lawless had handled the murder trial of Francis McIntosh. Arguing that the judge's actions appeared to condone the murder, he wrote that Lawless was "a Papist; and in his charge we see the cloven foot of Jesuitism." He also announced that his next issue would be printed in Alton. Before he could move the press, an angry mob broke into The Observer office and vandalized it. Only Alderman and future mayor Bryan Mullanphy attempted to stop the crime, and no policemen or city officials intervened. Lovejoy packed what remained of the office for shipment to Alton. The printing press sat on the riverbank, unguarded, overnight; vandals destroyed it and threw the remains into the Mississippi River.

=== Alton Observer ===
Lovejoy served as pastor at Upper Alton Presbyterian Church (now College Avenue Presbyterian Church). In 1837, he started the Alton Observer, also an abolitionist, Presbyterian paper. Lovejoy's views on slavery became more extreme, and he called for a convention to discuss forming an Illinois state chapter of the American Anti-Slavery Society, established in Philadelphia in 1833.

Many residents of Alton began to question whether they should continue to allow Lovejoy to print in their town. After an economic crisis in March 1837, Alton citizens wondered if Lovejoy's views were contributing to hard times. They felt Southern states, or even the city of St. Louis, might not want to do business with their town if they continued to harbor such an outspoken abolitionist.

Lovejoy held the Illinois Antislavery Congress at the Presbyterian church in Upper Alton on October 26, 1837. Supporters were surprised to see two pro-slavery advocates in the crowd, John Hogan and Illinois Attorney General Usher F. Linder. The Lovejoy supporters were not happy to have his enemies at the convention, but relented as the meeting was open to all parties.

Lovejoy's third press was delivered and destroyed sometime after the planning of this meeting, but before its announcement and call (late September - early October 1837).

On November 2, 1837, Lovejoy responded to threats in a speech, saying:

As long as I am an American citizen, and as long as American blood runs in these veins, I shall hold myself at liberty to speak, to write and to publish whatever I please, being amenable to the laws of my country for the same.

=== Mob attack and death ===
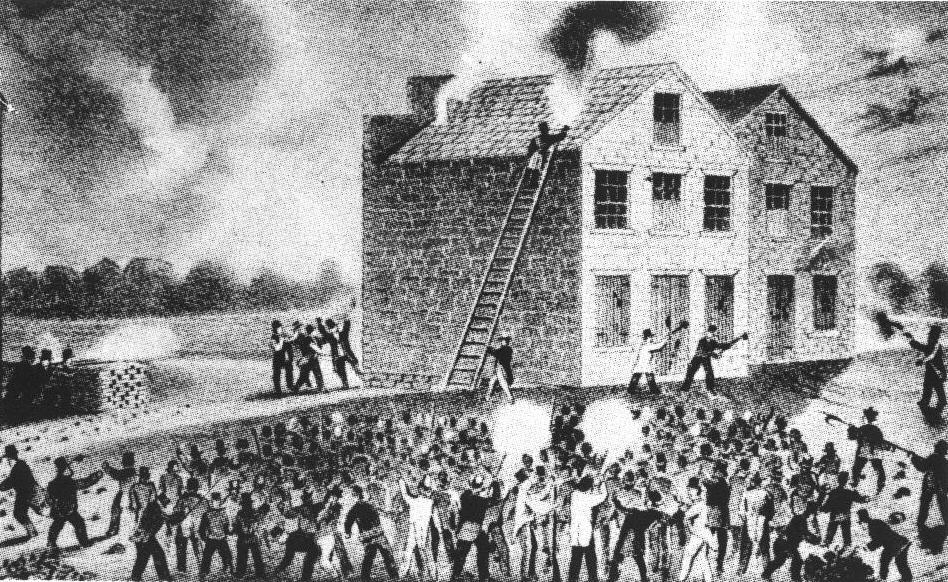
Wood engraving of the pro-slavery mob setting fire to Gilman & Godfrey's warehouse

Lovejoy had acquired a fourth press and hid it in a warehouse owned by Winthrop Sargent Gilman and Benjamin Godfrey, major grocers in the area. A mob, said by Appleton's to be composed mostly of Missourians, attacked the building on the evening of November 6, 1837. Pro-slavery partisans approached Gilman's warehouse, where Lovejoy had hidden his printing press. The conflict continued. According to the Alton Observer, the mob fired shots into the warehouse. When Lovejoy and his men returned fire, they hit several people in the crowd, killing a man named Bishop. After the attacking party had apparently withdrawn, Lovejoy opened the door and was instantly struck by five bullets, dying in a few minutes.

Jon Meacham in his book And There Was Light: Abraham Lincoln and the American Struggle notes that Lovejoy was murdered on November 7, 1837, after he helped William Lloyd Garrison found an Illinois chapter of Garrison's Anti-Slavery Society.

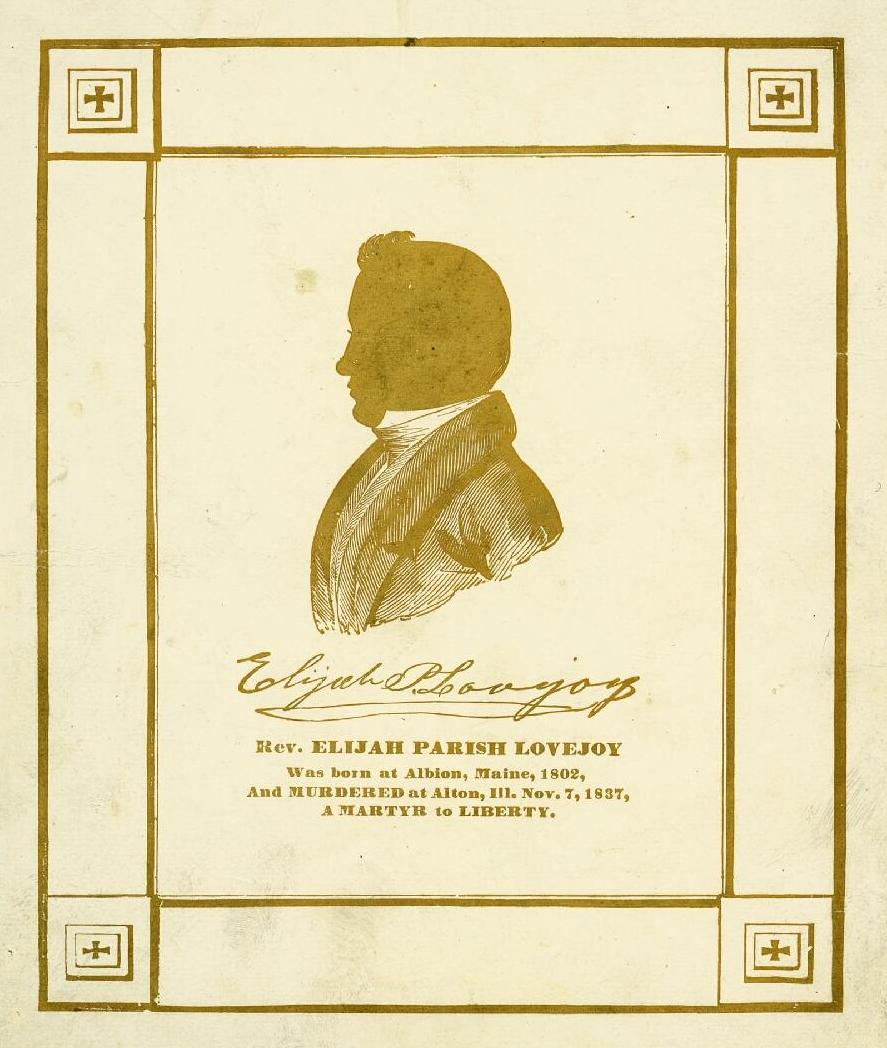
Mid-19th century memorial card with Lovejoy's silhouette

Elijah Lovejoy was buried in Alton Cemetery; his grave was unmarked to prevent vandalism. The ceremony was kept small. In 1864, journalist and lecturer Thomas Dimmock "reclaimed from oblivion" Lovejoy's grave. Dimmock had "succeeded in establishing the location of the grave... in a roadway where vehicles were passing over it... Mr. Dimmock had the bones disinterred and... laid in a new grave where they would be free from trespass." He also arranged for a gravestone and helped found a committee to create a monument to the editor. Dimmock was principal orator at the dedication of a later monument erected in 1897 to commemorate Lovejoy.

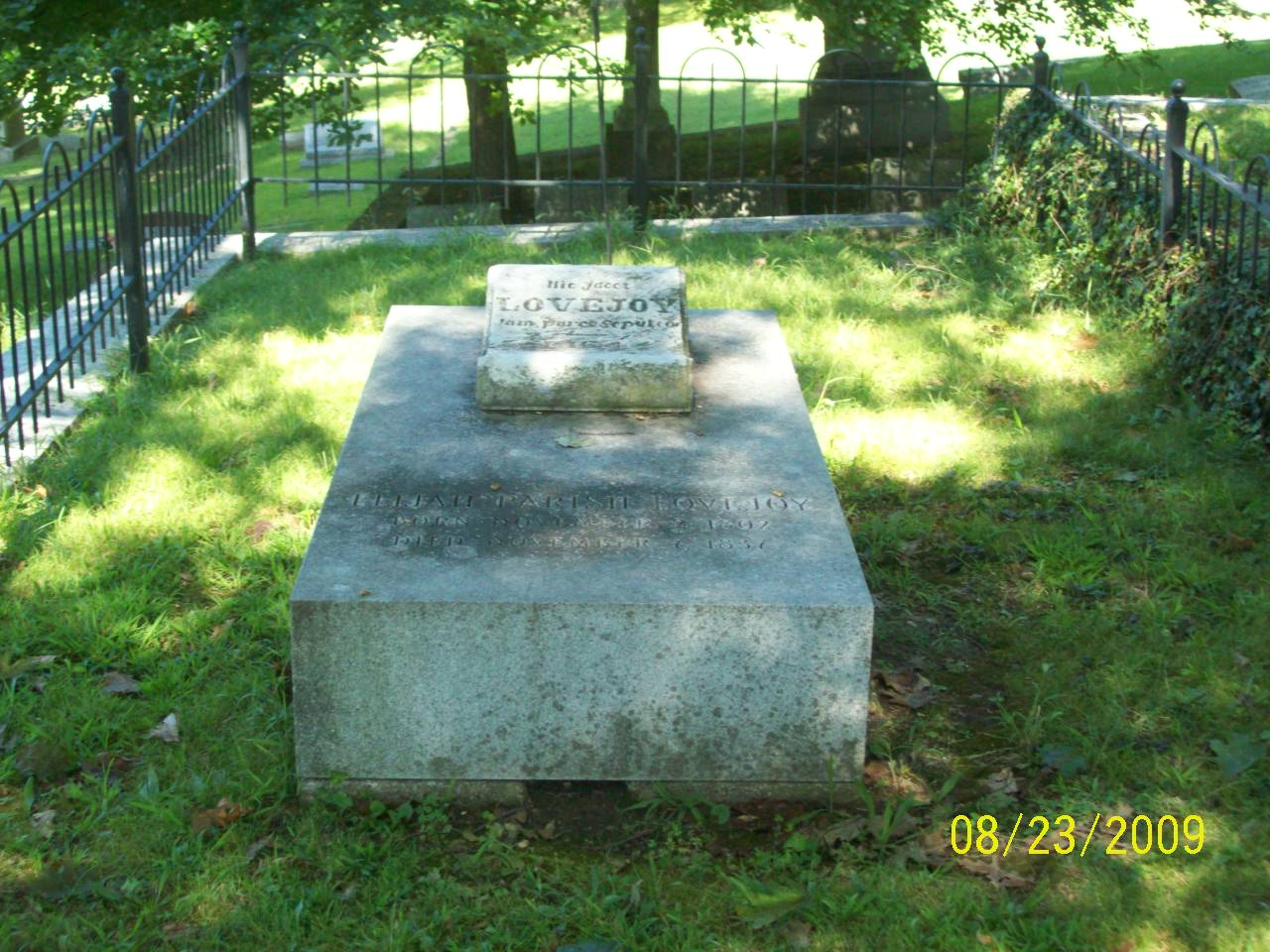
Elijah Lovejoy grave as it appeared in 2009

The Chicago Tribune said of the grave marking and association to fund a monument:

For many years Lovejoy's grave was unmarked and in danger of utter oblivion, until one who had known him in life, Thomas Dimmock of St. Louis ... marked the grave with the simple stone bearing he inscription: 'Hic jacet Lovejoy. Jam parce sepulto.' 'Here lies Lovejoy: now spare his grave.' It was largely through the efforts of Mr. Dimmock that ten years ago the Lovejoy Monument Association was formed....

== Alton riot trial ==
Francis B. Murdoch, the district attorney of Alton, prosecuted charges of riot related to both assailants and defenders of the warehouse in January 1838, on Wednesday and Friday of the same week. He called the Illinois Attorney General, Usher F. Linder, to assist him.

Murdoch (with Linder) first prosecuted Gilman, owner of the warehouse, and eleven other defenders of the new press and building. They were indicted on two charges related to the riot at a trial opening January 16, 1838, for "unlawful defence", so defined and charged because it was "violently and tumultuously done." Gilman moved to be tried separately; his counsel said he needed to be able to show his lack of criminal intent. The court agreed on the condition that the other eleven defendants would be tried together. Although the proceedings lasted until 10 p.m. that night, in the case of Gilman, the jury returned after ten minutes to declare him "Not Guilty." The next morning the "City Attorney entered a 'Nolle Prosequi' as to the other eleven defendants", effectively dismissing the charges against them.

A new jury was called to hear the case against the assailants of the warehouse. The attackers allegedly responsible for destruction of the warehouse and Lovejoy's death were tried beginning January 19, 1838. Concluding it was not possible to assign responsibility among the several suspects and others not indicted, the jury gave a verdict of "not guilty". The jury foreman had been identified as a member of the mob and was wounded in the attack. The presiding judge doubled as a witness to the proceedings. These conflicts of interest are believed to have contributed to the "not guilty" verdict.

== Aftermath and legacy ==
The 110-foot tall Elijah P. Lovejoy monument, in Alton, Illinois

After Lovejoy was killed, there was a dramatic increase in the number of people in the North and the West who joined anti-slavery societies, which formed beginning in the 1830s. Partly because he was a clergyman, there was outrage about his death. It became a catalyst for other pro- and anti-slavery events, like John Brown's raid on Harpers Ferry, that culminated with the American Civil War.

Lovejoy was considered a martyr by the abolition movement. In his name, his brother Owen Lovejoy became the leader of the Illinois abolitionists. Owen and his brother Joseph wrote a memoir about Elijah, which was published in 1838 by the Anti-Slavery Society in New York and distributed widely among abolitionists in the nation. With his killing symbolic of the rising tensions within the country, Lovejoy is called the "first casualty of the Civil War."

Abraham Lincoln referred to Lovejoy in his Lyceum address in January 1838. About Lovejoy's murder, Lincoln said, "Let every man remember that to violate the law [against violence], is to trample on the blood of his father, and to tear the charter of his own, and his children's liberty... Let reverence for the laws be breathed by every American mother...in short let it become the political religion of the nation..."; he warned that the United States could only fail if it was torn apart internally.

John Brown was inspired by Lovejoy's death. At a church meeting the Sunday after Lovejoy's murder, he vowed to commit his life to abolition. Two neighbors recalled that he announced: "I pledge myself, with God's help, that I devote my life to increasing hostility to slavery." A later recollection by his half-brother Edward Brown had a different formulation: "Here, before God, in the presence of these witnesses, from this time, I consecrate my life to the destruction of slavery."

John Glanville Gill completed his Ph.D. at Harvard in 1946 on The Issues Involved in the Death of the Rev. Elijah P. Lovejoy, Alton, 1837. This thesis was adapted and published in 1958 as the first biography of Lovejoy, entitled Tide Without Turning: Elijah P. Lovejoy and Freedom of the Press.

== Honors and awards ==
- Lovejoy was a 2013 Inductee into the National Abolition Hall of Fame in Peterboro, New York.
  - The Elijah Parish Lovejoy Award was established by Colby College in his honor. It is awarded annually to a member of the press who "has contributed to the nation's journalistic achievement." A major classroom building at Colby is also named for Lovejoy. An inscribed memorial rock from his birthplace was installed in a grassy square at Colby.
  - In 2003, Reed College established the Elijah Parish and Owen Lovejoy Scholarship, which it awards annually.
- Memorials and plaques
  - In 1897, the 110-foot tall Elijah P. Lovejoy Monument was erected at Alton's City Cemetery; $25,000 had been appropriated by the state legislature, and $5,000 raised by residents of Alton and other supporters.
  - A plaque honoring Elijah Parish Lovejoy was installed on an external wall at the Mackay Campus Center at his alma mater, Princeton Theological Seminary.
  - He is the first person listed in the "Journalists Memorial" located at the Newseum, 555 Pennsylvania Avenue NW, Washington, DC.
  - Elijah Lovejoy is recognized by a star on the St. Louis Walk of Fame.
- Numerous places and institutions were named after him:
  - The majority African-American village of Brooklyn, Illinois, located just north of East St. Louis, is popularly known as 'Lovejoy' in his honor.
  - The Presbytery of Giddings-Lovejoy, Presbyterian Church (USA), formed on January 3, 1985, from the merger of Elijah Parish Lovejoy Presbytery and the Presbytery of Southeast Missouri.
  - Lovejoy Health Center in Albion, Maine, his birthplace.
  - The Lovejoy School in Washington, D.C. was named in his honor in 1870. It moved to a new Victorian building at 12th and D Street NE in 1872, and closed in 1988. It was adapted and converted to the Lovejoy Lofts condominiums in 2004.
  - Lovejoy Elementary School in Alton, Illinois.
  - LoveJoy United Presbyterian Church, Wood River, Illinois
  - Lovejoy Library at Southern Illinois University Edwardsville

== See also ==
- List of homicides in Illinois § Lynchings and race riots
- Censorship in the United States
- List of journalists killed in the United States
- List of unsolved murders (before 1900)
- John R. Anderson (minister), who worked for Lovejoy and witnessed his murder
