= St. Louis Observer =

Abolitionist newspaper in St. Louis

The St. Louis Observer was an abolitionist newspaper established by Elijah Lovejoy, a New England Congregationalist minister, in St. Louis, Missouri. After the newspaper's printing press was destroyed for a third time by a pro-slavery mob, the newspaper was re-located to Alton, Illinois, and renamed the Alton Observer.

== See also ==
- Abolitionism in the United States
- Elijah Lovejoy
- Alton Observer
